= Listed buildings in Derbyshire =

There are a number of listed buildings in Derbyshire. The term "listed building", in the United Kingdom, refers to a building or structure designated as being of special architectural, historical, or cultural significance. Details of all the listed buildings are contained in the National Heritage List for England. They are categorised in three grades: Grade I consists of buildings of outstanding architectural or historical interest, Grade II* includes significant buildings of more than local interest and Grade II consists of buildings of special architectural or historical interest. Buildings in England are listed by the Secretary of State for Culture, Media and Sport on recommendations provided by English Heritage, which also determines the grading.

Some listed buildings are looked after by the National Trust or English Heritage while others are in private ownership or administered by trusts.

== Listed buildings by grade ==
- Grade I listed buildings in Derbyshire
- Grade II* listed buildings in Derbyshire
- Grade II listed buildings in Derbyshire

== Listed buildings by civil parish or unparished area ==
=== Amber Valley ===
- Listed buildings in Aldercar and Langley Mill
- Listed buildings in Alderwasley
- Listed buildings in Alfreton
- Listed buildings in Ashleyhay
- Listed buildings in Belper
- Listed buildings in Codnor
- Listed buildings in Crich
- Listed buildings in Denby
- Listed buildings in Dethick, Lea and Holloway
- Listed buildings in Duffield, Derbyshire
- Listed buildings in Hazelwood, Derbyshire
- Listed buildings in Heanor and Loscoe
- Listed buildings in Holbrook, Derbyshire
- Listed buildings in Horsley, Derbyshire, and Horsley Woodhouse
- Listed buildings in Idridgehay and Alton
- Listed buildings in Ironville
- Listed buildings in Ironville and Riddings Ward
- Listed buildings in Kedleston
- Listed buildings in Kilburn, Derbyshire
- Listed buildings in Kirk Langley
- Listed buildings in Mackworth, Amber Valley
- Listed buildings in Mapperley, Derbyshire
- Listed buildings in Pentrich
- Listed buildings in Quarndon
- Listed buildings in Ripley, Derbyshire
- Listed buildings in Shipley, Derbyshire
- Listed buildings in Shottle and Postern
- Listed buildings in Smalley, Derbyshire
- Listed buildings in South Wingfield
- Listed buildings in Swanwick, Derbyshire
- Listed buildings in Turnditch
- Listed buildings in Weston Underwood, Derbyshire
- Listed buildings in Windley

=== Bolsover ===
- Listed buildings in Ault Hucknall
- Listed buildings in Barlborough
- Listed buildings in Blackwell, Bolsover
- Listed buildings in Clowne
- Listed buildings in Elmton with Creswell
- Listed buildings in Glapwell
- Listed buildings in Langwith, Derbyshire
- Listed buildings in Old Bolsover
- Listed buildings in Pinxton
- Listed buildings in Pleasley
- Listed buildings in Scarcliffe
- Listed buildings in Shirebrook
- Listed buildings in South Normanton
- Listed buildings in Tibshelf
- Listed buildings in Whitwell, Derbyshire

=== Chesterfield ===
- Listed buildings in Brimington
- Listed buildings in Chesterfield, Derbyshire
- Listed buildings in Staveley, Derbyshire

=== City of Derby ===
- Listed buildings in Allestree
- Listed buildings in Alvaston
- Listed buildings in Boulton, Derby
- Listed buildings in Chaddesden
- Listed buildings in Chellaston
- Listed buildings in Darley Abbey
- Listed buildings in Derby (Abbey Ward)
- Listed buildings in Derby (Arboretum Ward)
- Listed buildings in Derby (Blagreaves and Sinfin Wards)
- Listed buildings in Derby (Derwent Ward)
- Listed buildings in Derby (Mackworth Ward)
- Listed buildings in Derby (northern area)
- Listed buildings in Littleover
- Listed buildings in Mickleover
- Listed buildings in Normanton, Derby
- Listed buildings in Spondon

=== Derbyshire Dales ===
- Listed buildings in Aldwark, Derbyshire
- Listed buildings in Alkmonton
- Listed buildings in Ashbourne, Derbyshire
- Listed buildings in Ashford-in-the-Water
- Listed buildings in Atlow
- Listed buildings in Bakewell
- Listed buildings in Ballidon
- Listed buildings in Baslow and Bubnell
- Listed buildings in Beeley
- Listed buildings in Biggin by Hulland
- Listed buildings in Birchover
- Listed buildings in Bonsall, Derbyshire
- Listed buildings in Boylestone
- Listed buildings in Bradbourne
- Listed buildings in Bradley, Derbyshire
- Listed buildings in Bradwell, Derbyshire
- Listed buildings in Brailsford
- Listed buildings in Brassington
- Listed buildings in Callow, Derbyshire
- Listed buildings in Calver
- Listed buildings in Carsington
- Listed buildings in Chatsworth, Derbyshire
- Listed buildings in Chelmorton
- Listed buildings in Clifton and Compton
- Listed buildings in Cromford
- Listed buildings in Cubley, Derbyshire
- Listed buildings in Curbar
- Listed buildings in Darley Dale
- Listed buildings in Doveridge
- Listed buildings in Eaton and Alsop
- Listed buildings in Edensor
- Listed buildings in Edlaston and Wyaston
- Listed buildings in Elton, Derbyshire
- Listed buildings in Eyam
- Listed buildings in Fenny Bentley
- Listed buildings in Flagg, Derbyshire
- Listed buildings in Foolow
- Listed buildings in Froggatt, Derbyshire
- Listed buildings in Gratton, Derbyshire
- Listed buildings in Great Hucklow
- Listed buildings in Great Longstone
- Listed buildings in Grindleford
- Listed buildings in Harthill, Derbyshire
- Listed buildings in Hartington Middle Quarter
- Listed buildings in Hartington Nether Quarter
- Listed buildings in Hartington Town Quarter
- Listed buildings in Hassop
- Listed buildings in Hathersage
- Listed buildings in Hazlebadge
- Listed buildings in Highlow
- Listed buildings in Hognaston
- Listed buildings in Hollington, Derbyshire
- Listed buildings in Hopton, Derbyshire
- Listed buildings in Hulland
- Listed buildings in Hulland Ward
- Listed buildings in Hungry Bentley
- Listed buildings in Kirk Ireton
- Listed buildings in Kniveton
- Listed buildings in Little Longstone
- Listed buildings in Litton, Derbyshire
- Listed buildings in Longford, Derbyshire
- Listed buildings in Mapleton, Derbyshire
- Listed buildings in Marston Montgomery
- Listed buildings in Matlock Bath
- Listed buildings in Matlock Town
- Listed buildings in Melbourne, Derbyshire
- Listed buildings in Mercaston
- Listed buildings in Middleton-by-Wirksworth
- Listed buildings in Middleton and Smerrill
- Listed buildings in Monyash
- Listed buildings in Nether Haddon
- Listed buildings in Newton Grange, Derbyshire
- Listed buildings in Norbury and Roston
- Listed buildings in Offcote and Underwood
- Listed buildings in Offerton, Derbyshire
- Listed buildings in Osmaston, Derbyshire Dales
- Listed buildings in Over Haddon
- Listed buildings in Parwich
- Listed buildings in Pilsley, Derbyshire Dales
- Listed buildings in Rodsley
- Listed buildings in Rowland, Derbyshire
- Listed buildings in Rowsley
- Listed buildings in Sheldon, Derbyshire
- Listed buildings in Shirley, Derbyshire
- Listed buildings in Snelston
- Listed buildings in Somersal Herbert
- Listed buildings in South Darley
- Listed buildings in Stanton, Derbyshire
- Listed buildings in Stoney Middleton
- Listed buildings in Sudbury, Derbyshire
- Listed buildings in Taddington
- Listed buildings in Tansley
- Listed buildings in Thorpe, Derbyshire
- Listed buildings in Tideswell
- Listed buildings in Tissington and Lea Hall
- Listed buildings in Wardlow, Derbyshire
- Listed buildings in Wheston
- Listed buildings in Winster
- Listed buildings in Wirksworth
- Listed buildings in Yeaveley
- Listed buildings in Yeldersley
- Listed buildings in Youlgreave

=== Erewash ===
- Listed buildings in Breadsall
- Listed buildings in Breaston
- Listed buildings in Dale Abbey
- Listed buildings in Draycott and Church Wilne
- Listed buildings in Ilkeston
- Listed buildings in Little Eaton
- Listed buildings in Long Eaton
- Listed buildings in Ockbrook and Borrowash
- Listed buildings in Risley, Derbyshire
- Listed buildings in Sandiacre
- Listed buildings in Sawley, Derbyshire
- Listed buildings in Stanley and Stanley Common
- Listed buildings in Stanton by Dale
- Listed buildings in West Hallam

=== High Peak ===
- Listed buildings in Aston, High Peak
- Listed buildings in Bamford
- Listed buildings in Brough and Shatton
- Listed buildings in Burbage, Derbyshire
- Listed buildings in Buxton
- Listed buildings in Castleton, Derbyshire
- Listed buildings in Chapel-en-le-Frith
- Listed buildings in Charlesworth, Derbyshire
- Listed buildings in Chinley, Buxworth and Brownside
- Listed buildings in Chisworth
- Listed buildings in Derwent, Derbyshire
- Listed buildings in Edale
- Listed buildings in Fairfield, Derbyshire
- Listed buildings in Glossop
- Listed buildings in Green Fairfield
- Listed buildings in Hadfield, Derbyshire
- Listed buildings in Hartington Upper Quarter
- Listed buildings in Hayfield, Derbyshire
- Listed buildings in Hope, Derbyshire
- Listed buildings in Hope Woodlands
- Listed buildings in King Sterndale
- Listed buildings in New Mills
- Listed buildings in Padfield
- Listed buildings in Peak Forest
- Listed buildings in Simmondley
- Listed buildings in Thornhill, Derbyshire
- Listed buildings in Tintwistle
- Listed buildings in Whaley Bridge
- Listed buildings in Whitfield, Derbyshire
- Listed buildings in Wormhill

=== North East Derbyshire ===
- Listed buildings in Ashover
- Listed buildings in Barlow, Derbyshire
- Listed buildings in Brackenfield
- Listed buildings in Brampton, North East Derbyshire
- Listed buildings in Calow
- Listed buildings in Clay Cross
- Listed buildings in Dronfield
- Listed buildings in Eckington, Derbyshire
- Listed buildings in Heath and Holmewood
- Listed buildings in Holmesfield
- Listed buildings in Holymoorside and Walton
- Listed buildings in Killamarsh
- Listed buildings in Morton, Derbyshire
- Listed buildings in North Wingfield
- Listed buildings in Pilsley, North East Derbyshire
- Listed buildings in Shirland and Higham
- Listed buildings in Stretton, Derbyshire
- Listed buildings in Sutton cum Duckmanton
- Listed buildings in Tupton
- Listed buildings in Unstone
- Listed buildings in Wessington
- Listed buildings in Wingerworth

=== South Derbyshire ===
- Listed buildings in Aston-on-Trent
- Listed buildings in Barrow upon Trent
- Listed buildings in Barton Blount
- Listed buildings in Bretby
- Listed buildings in Burnaston
- Listed buildings in Calke
- Listed buildings in Catton, Derbyshire
- Listed buildings in Cauldwell, Derbyshire
- Listed buildings in Church Broughton
- Listed buildings in Coton in the Elms
- Listed buildings in Dalbury Lees
- Listed buildings in Drakelow
- Listed buildings in Egginton
- Listed buildings in Elvaston, Derbyshire
- Listed buildings in Etwall
- Listed buildings in Findern
- Listed buildings in Foremark
- Listed buildings in Foston and Scropton
- Listed buildings in Hartshorne, Derbyshire
- Listed buildings in Hatton, Derbyshire
- Listed buildings in Hilton, Derbyshire
- Listed buildings in Ingleby, Derbyshire
- Listed buildings in Linton, Derbyshire
- Listed buildings in Lullington, Derbyshire
- Listed buildings in Marston on Dove
- Listed buildings in Netherseal
- Listed buildings in Newton Solney
- Listed buildings in Osleston and Thurvaston
- Listed buildings in Overseal
- Listed buildings in Radbourne, Derbyshire
- Listed buildings in Repton
- Listed buildings in Shardlow and Great Wilne
- Listed buildings in Smisby
- Listed buildings in Swadlincote
- Listed buildings in Stanton by Bridge
- Listed buildings in Sutton on the Hill
- Listed buildings in Swarkestone
- Listed buildings in Ticknall
- Listed buildings in Trusley
- Listed buildings in Twyford and Stenson
- Listed buildings in Walton-on-Trent
- Listed buildings in Weston-on-Trent
- Listed buildings in Willington, Derbyshire
- Listed buildings in Woodville, Derbyshire
