= Ann Croft =

Coordinates: 53°14′58″N 1°56′33″W

Ann Croft is a place in the parish of Hartington Upper Quarter in the Hundred of Wirksworth. A croft is a small enclosed field or pasture near a house.
