= Aldwark, Derbyshire =

Village in Derbyshire, England

Coordinates: 53°06′47″N 1°39′36″W

Aldwark
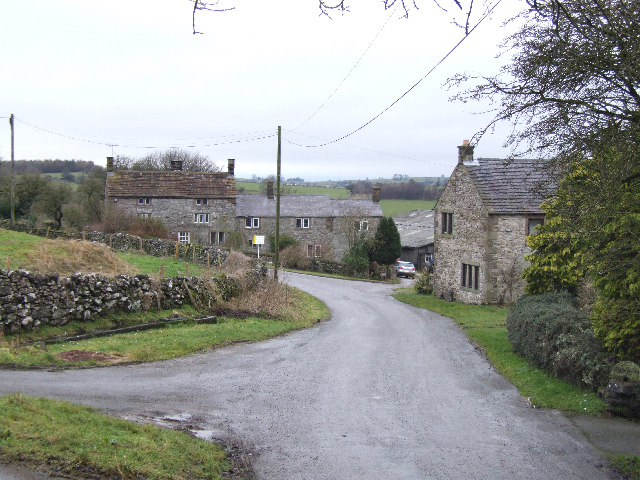
- The small village in 2006

- Location within Derbyshire
- Population: 189 (Including Ballidon and Grangemill 2011)
- OS grid reference: SK228573
- District: Derbyshire Dales
- Shire county: Derbyshire
- Region: East Midlands
- Country: England
- Sovereign state: United Kingdom
- Post town: Matlock
- Postcode district: DE4
- Police: Derbyshire
- Fire: Derbyshire
- Ambulance: East Midlands

Aldwark (Old English "the old fortification") is a small upland village and parish in the Derbyshire Dales district of Derbyshire, England, about 8 miles (13 km) WSW of Matlock by road or 5 miles (8 km) as the crow flies. Close by are a number of Neolithic burial sites, the most notable being tree-crowned Minninglow, visible for many miles around.

The village is just within the boundaries of the Peak District National Park. The 2001 census recorded a population of just 39 for the parish; over 100 years ago, the township's inhabitants numbered 40. At the 2011 Census the population had increased to 180. In the 18th century Aldwark was probably busier, being a stopping point on the stagecoach route from Buxton to Derby.

There are three listed buildings in the village – Green Farmhouse, Ivy Cottage and Lidgate Farmhouse – all designated at Grade II.

== See also ==
- Listed buildings in Aldwark, Derbyshire
