= Chisworth =

Hamlet in Derbyshire, England

Coordinates: 53.426°N 2.015°W

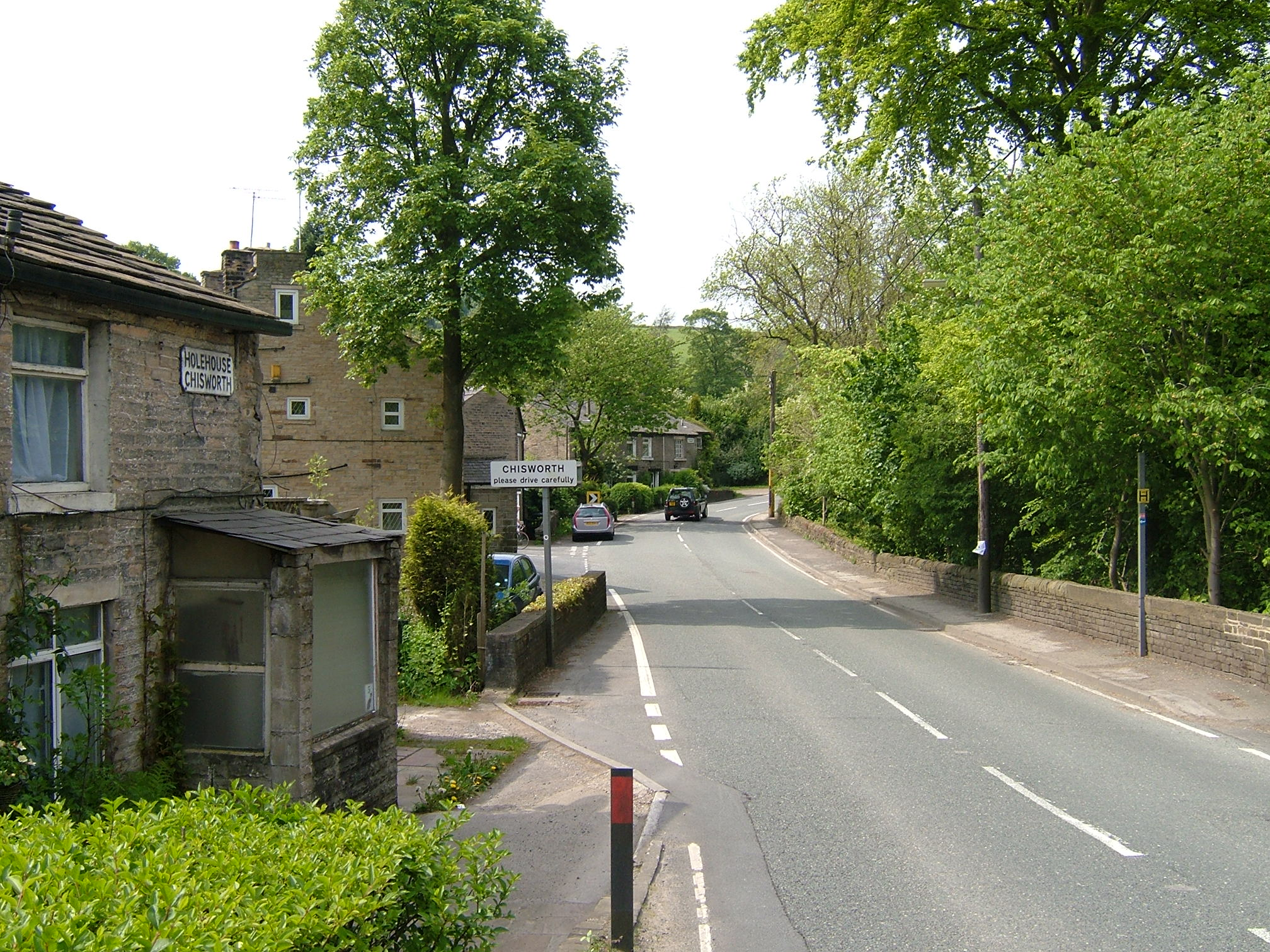

- Chisworth parish highlighted within Derbyshire
- OS grid reference: SK995920
- District: High Peak
- Shire county: Derbyshire
- Region: East Midlands
- Country: England
- Sovereign state: United Kingdom
- Post town: GLOSSOP
- Postcode district: SK13
- Police: Derbyshire
- Fire: Derbyshire
- Ambulance: North West
- UK Parliament: High Peak

Chisworth is a hamlet near Glossop, Derbyshire, England. It is 3 miles (4.8 km) south-west of Glossop town centre, on the south side of the Etherow valley. The parish of Chisworth was formed in 1896, out of the parish of Chisworth and Ludworth. In 1901, it had a population of 409. From 1896 until 1934 it was in the Glossop Rural District, when it was placed with Ludworth into the Chapel en le Frith Rural District. The village possesses a Methodist chapel. The A626 road passes through the hamlet. In June 1930, a local cloudburst caused flooding that killed one man and destroyed equipment at the mills, one of which never reopened.

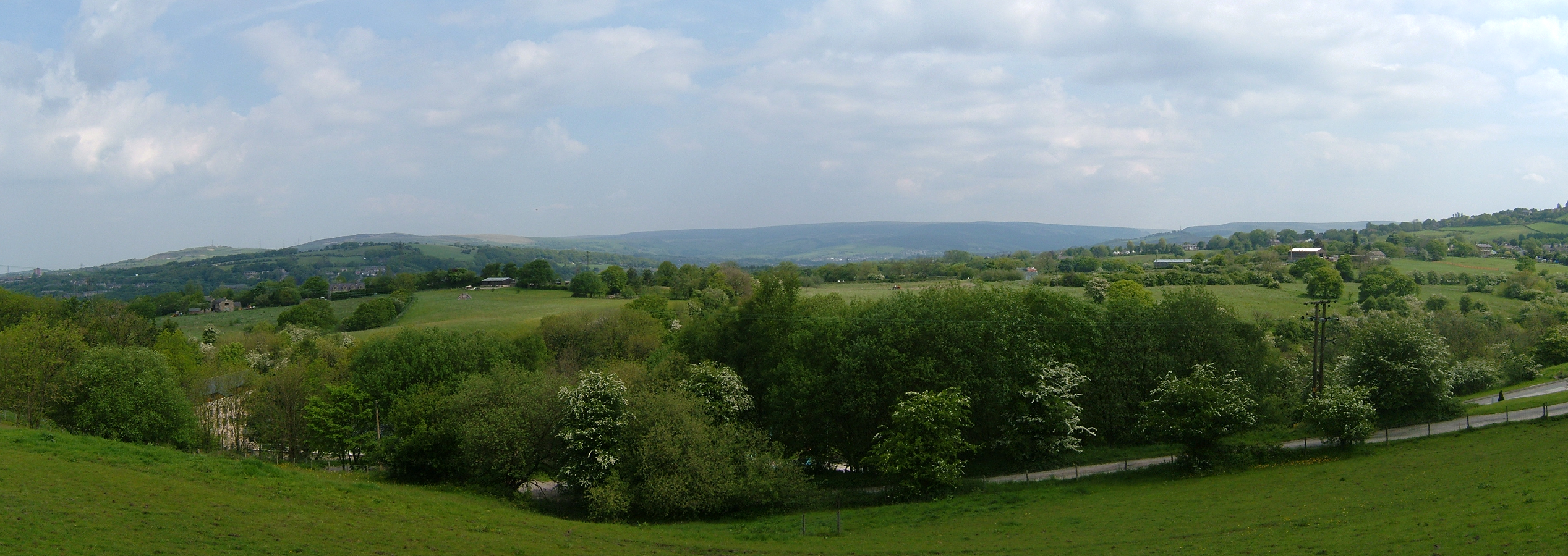
Panorama from the A626, over Kinderlee Mill and the Etherow valley

== Robin Hood's Picking Rods ==
Robin Hood's Picking Rods are a pair of cross shafts described by Historic England as "a wayside and a boundary cross" beside a bridleway at the southern extremity of the parish, thought to be Anglo-Saxon in date. Nearby is a cup-and-ring-marked rock, likely to date from the Bronze Age.

== Kinderlee Mill ==
Kinderlee Mill made yarn thread and baut (string) and was owned by J. H. Ratcliffe, who later sold it to the Rowbottoms. In 1930 it was damaged by a flood and the mill went bankrupt during the slump and was sold to Jacksons of Bradford, who used it to weave belting. In 2008 the mill was converted to residential use and newly built town houses were on the market the following year.

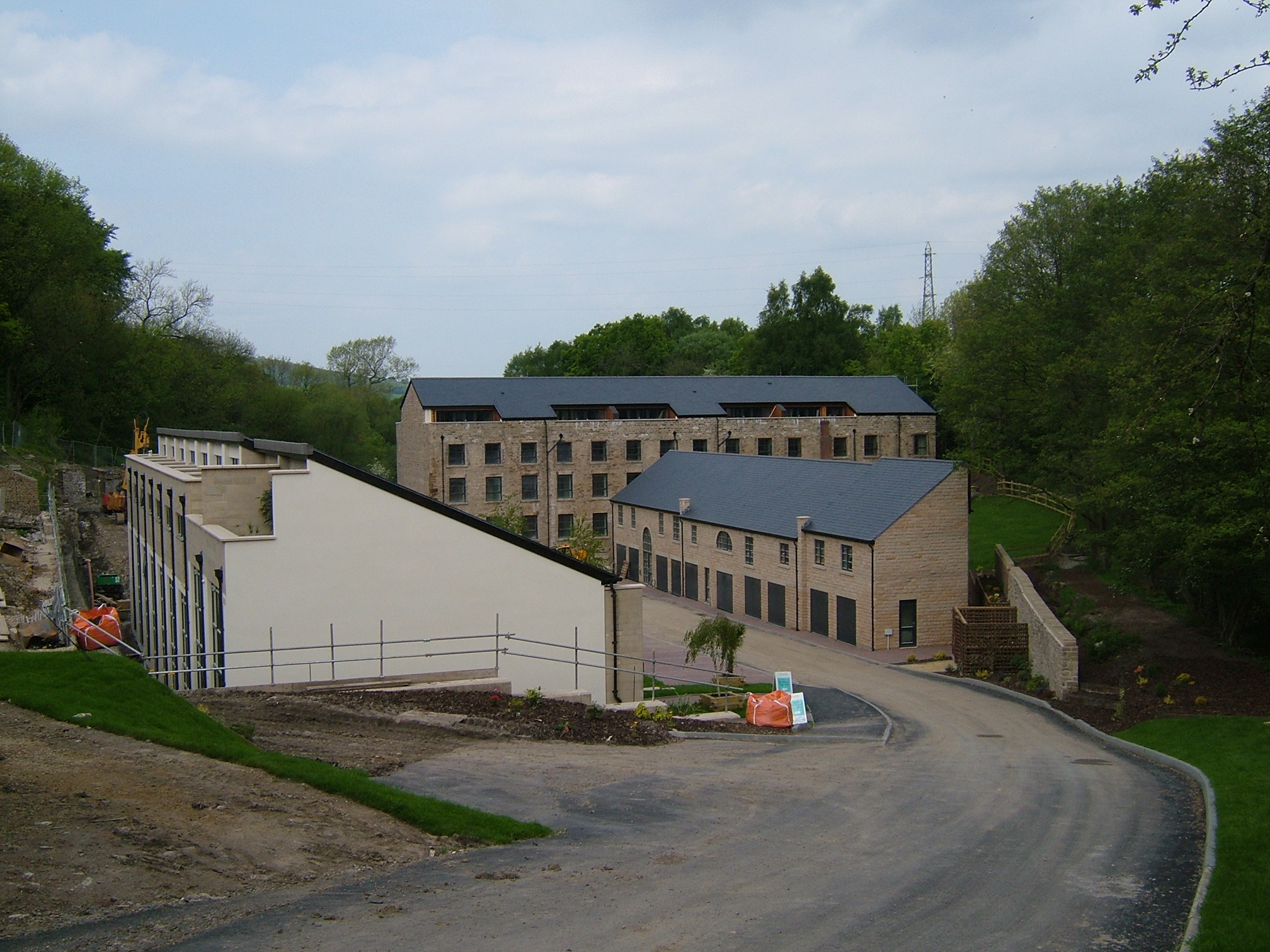
Kinderlee Mill and new town houses 2009

== Holehouse Mill ==
Holehouse Mill made rope and twine, and was owned by the Rowbottoms. In 1929 it suffered two fires within six months.

== Chew Wood Mill ==
Chew Wood Mill was built in 1795, and was powered by water taken from the overflow from the Alma Coal Pit. It was managed by the Rowbottom family for 99 years. It was originally a carding and scrubbing mill for wool employing 14 children and women. It was used in the Boer War (1899–1902) to dye Khaki cloth for uniforms. It was flooded in June 1930 and subsequently closed and was demolished.

== Lee Valley Bleach Works ==
Known as the Bone Mill, it burnt down in 1917. It was rebuilt but never worked.

== Coal ==
The Alma Coal Pit was at the junction of Sandy and Sanders Lane; the loading bay was at the wide paved part of the road and a small brick building opposite was the weighing machine box. This pit closed towards the end of the last century when they struck an underground stream and the mine was flooded. It was a deep pit employing a lot of miners; the winding shaft was 120 yards deep and is now capped. The stream runs down a tunnel opposite Sandy Lane Farm. During the coal strike of 1921, local men and those from Glossop had some success in digging for coal in Chew Woods.

There were opencast workings at Mount View, documented in a book Ludworth Moor Colliery by Geoffrey du Feu and Roderick Thackray.

== See also ==
- Listed buildings in Chisworth

== Bibliography ==
- Bocking, Hannah. "Reminiscences of Hannah Bocking of Intake Farm, Chisworth". Display board on site.
- Quayle, Tom (2006). The Cotton Industry in Longdendale and Glossopdale. Stroud, Gloucestershire: Tempus. p. 159. ISBN 0-7524-3883-2.
