= Rowland, Derbyshire =

Village and civil parish in Derbyshire, United Kingdom

Coordinates: 53.2488°N 1.6817°W

Rowland is a village and a civil parish in the Derbyshire Dales District, in the English county of Derbyshire. It is near the larger village of Great Longstone (where the population is included). Rowland lies within the chapelry of Baslow. Rowland is within the Peak District National Park.

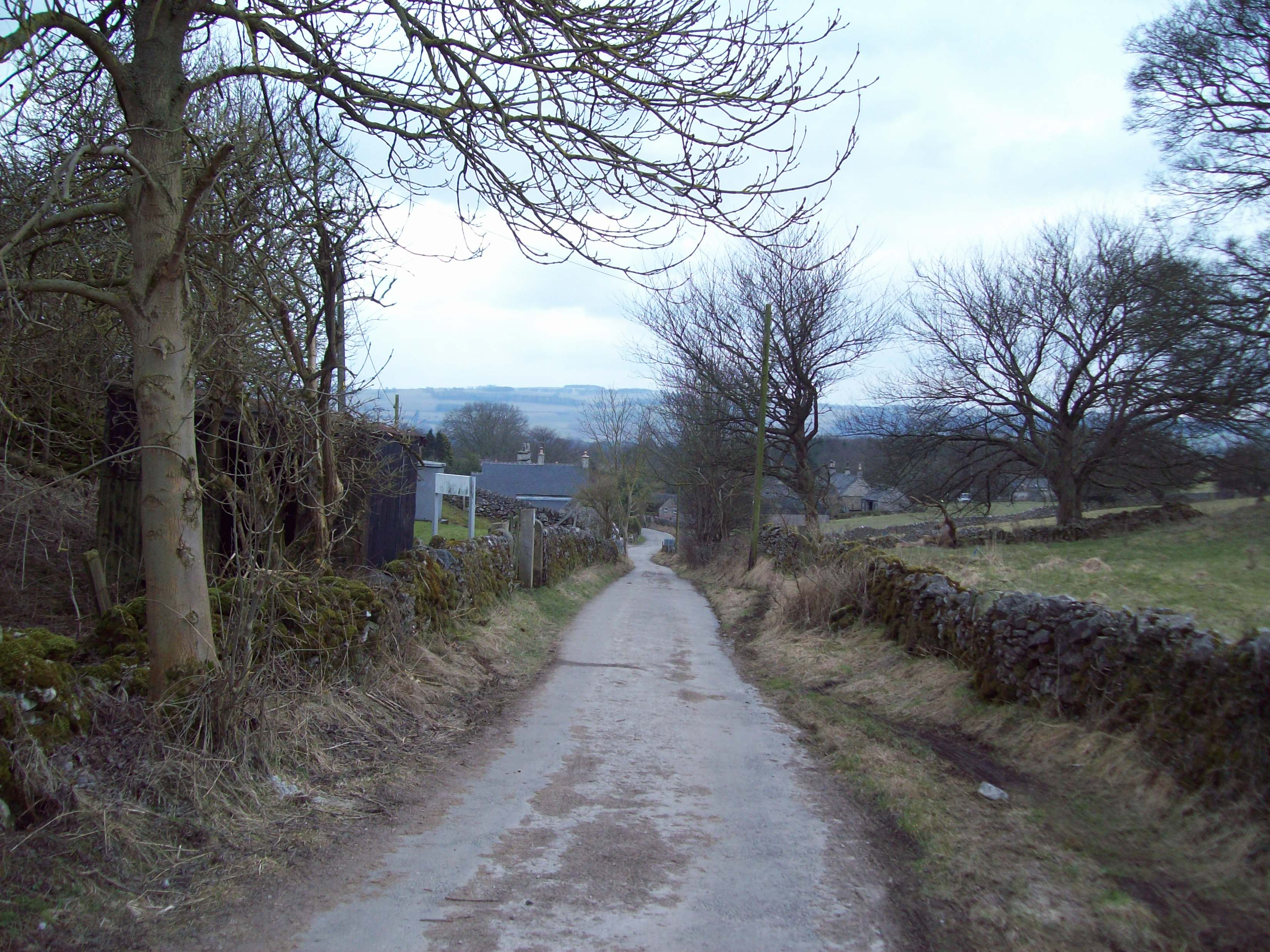
Heading into the hamlet of Rowland

== See also ==
- Listed buildings in Rowland, Derbyshire
