= Mapperley, Derbyshire =

Village and civil parish in Derbyshire, England

Coordinates: 52.982°N 1.353°W

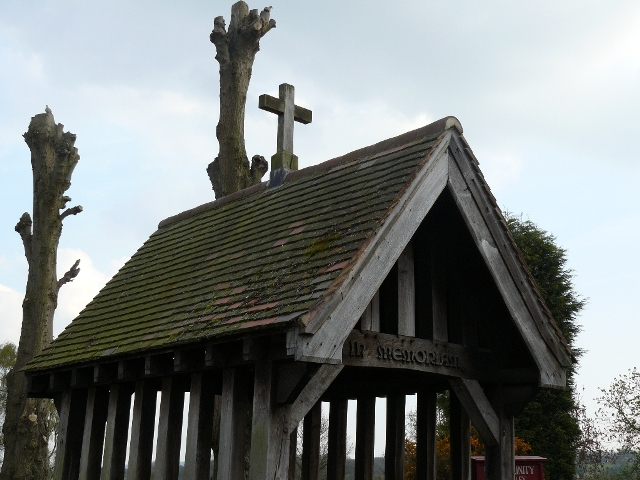
The Lychgate of the church

Mapperley is a village and civil parish in the Amber Valley district of Derbyshire, England, situated 7 miles (11 km) northeast of Derby and 2 miles (3 km) northwest of Ilkeston. In the 2001 census it had a population of 253, increasing to 289 at the 2011 Census.

The village is on a loop off the A609 Nottingham to Belper road. A minor road leading to Shipley was closed by Derbyshire County Council in 2007.

The village is inaccessible from the rest of Amber Valley Borough by road without first passing through Erewash Borough.

The facilities in the village include a church, a C of E primary school and a pub.

Mapperley Colliery, which was in operation from 1871 until 1965, was formerly a major employer in the area.

== See also ==
- Listed buildings in Mapperley, Derbyshire
