= Flagg, Derbyshire =

Village in Derbyshire, England

Coordinates: 53.212°N 1.797°W

Flagg
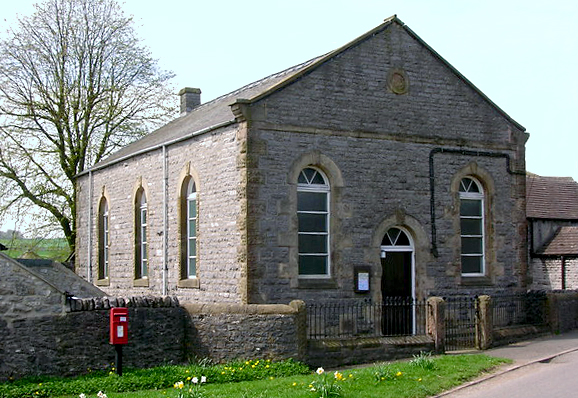
- Flagg Methodist Chapel.

- Location within Derbyshire
- Population: 192 (2011)
- OS grid reference: SK136683
- District: Derbyshire Dales
- Shire county: Derbyshire
- Region: East Midlands
- Country: England
- Sovereign state: United Kingdom
- Post town: BUXTON
- Postcode district: SK17
- Dialling code: 01298
- Police: Derbyshire
- Fire: Derbyshire
- Ambulance: East Midlands
- UK Parliament: Derbyshire Dales

Flagg (Old Norse A sod of peat) is a small Peak District village and civil parish, set in the Derbyshire Dales, halfway between the small market town of Bakewell and the spa town of Buxton, in the area known as the White Peak. The population of the civil parish as taken at the 2011 Census was 192.

Flagg is predominantly a farming village. As well as farms, houses and cottages, Flagg has an Elizabethan manor house, Flagg Hall, which is not open to the public. There is a caravan/campsite within its grounds. The former Unitarian church, built in 1838, is now a private dwelling. A Methodist chapel is also situated in the village. It was completed in 1839. Next to the chapel is the former village school, now a nursery school.

1000 feet above sea level, Flagg is recorded in the Domesday Book as "Flagun", and is believed to have originally been a Viking settlement engaged primarily in lead mining, the evidence of which can still be seen today with many spoil heaps and disused mine shafts in the area. In the mid-19th century, well dressings were held during "Wakes Week", which was always begun on the first Sunday after June 24. There were two wells, one opposite to Ivy House Farm, and the other opposite to Edge Close Farm.

Flagg is known for the point-to-point races held annually on Easter Tuesday by the High Peak Hunt. On one occasion, King Edward VIII, the then Prince of Wales, rode at the races. The village is also popular with hikers and campers, having numerous walks within or close to its boundaries, and several campsites catering for tents, caravans, and motorhomes.

== See also ==
- Listed buildings in Flagg, Derbyshire
