= Gratton, Derbyshire =

Civil parish in Derbyshire, England

Coordinates: 53.149°N 1.695°W

Gratton
- Location within Derbyshire
- OS grid reference: SK 2050 6136
- District: Derbyshire Dales
- Shire county: Derbyshire
- Region: East Midlands
- Country: England
- Sovereign state: United Kingdom
- Post town: Bakewell
- Postcode district: DE45
- Dialling code: 01629
- Police: Derbyshire
- Fire: Derbyshire
- Ambulance: East Midlands
- UK Parliament: Derbyshire Dales

Gratton is a civil parish in the Derbyshire Dales district of central Derbyshire, half a mile west of the neighbouring village, Elton.

== See also ==
- Listed buildings in Gratton, Derbyshire
