= Aston, High Peak =

Village in Derbyshire, England

Coordinates: 53.352°N 1.723°W

Aston
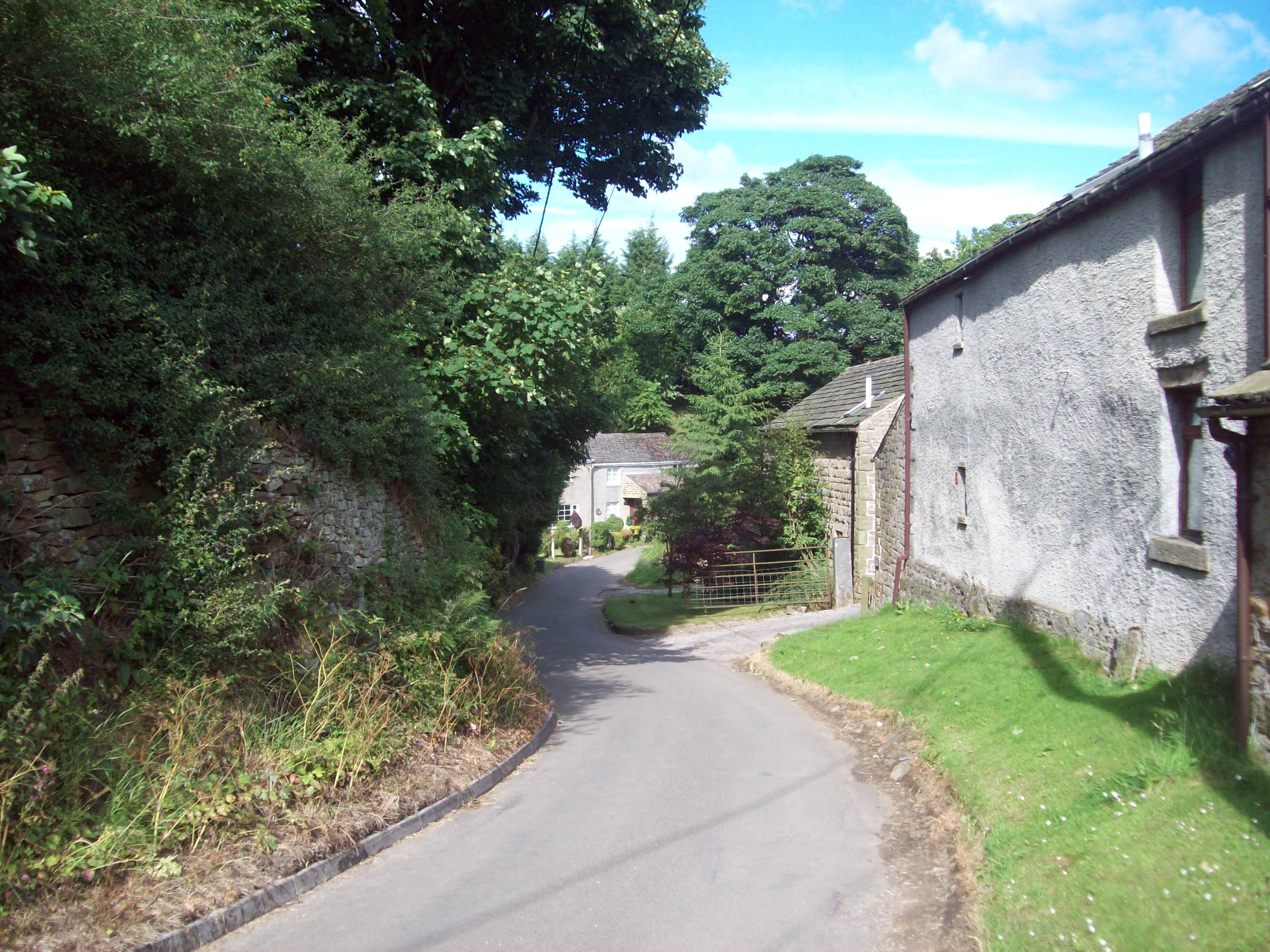
- Thornhill Lane, Aston

- Aston parish highlighted within Derbyshire
- Population: 155 (2011)
- OS grid reference: SK185839
- District: High Peak
- Shire county: Derbyshire
- Region: East Midlands
- Country: England
- Sovereign state: United Kingdom
- Post town: HOPE VALLEY
- Postcode district: S33
- Police: Derbyshire
- Fire: Derbyshire
- Ambulance: East Midlands

Aston (Old English: East farm or settlement) is a village and civil parish in the High Peak district of Derbyshire, England, located in the Peak District near Hope. According to the 2001 census it had a population of 100, increasing to 155 and including Ashopton in the Census 2011.

== See also ==
- Listed buildings in Aston, High Peak
- Yorkshire Bridge
