= Hartington Upper Quarter =

Civil parish in Derbyshire, England

Coordinates: 53°16′29″N 1°58′36″W

Hartington Upper Quarter is a civil parish in the High Peak district of Derbyshire, England. The civil parish was created following the division of the ancient parish of Hartington into four. The parish had a population of 451 according to the 2001 Census, reducing to 438 at the 2011 Census and 410 at the 2021 Census.

The parish is long and thin, extending from north-west of Buxton, taking in the Errwood Reservoir, to the south-east, and Ann Croft. The parish borders parishes in High Peak and Derbyshire Dales districts, and also some parishes in the Staffordshire Moorlands and Cheshire East districts.

== See also ==
- Listed buildings in Hartington Upper Quarter
