= Callow, Derbyshire =

Village and civil parish in Derbyshire, England

Coordinates: 53.0654°N 1.6054°W

Callow parish highlighted within Derbyshire

Callow is a village and a civil parish in the Derbyshire Dales District, in the English county of Derbyshire. At the 2011 Census the population of the civil parish was less than 100. Details are included in the civil parish of Kirk Ireton. It is near the small town of Wirksworth and the reservoir Carsington Water.

Callow is recorded as Caldelawe in 1086 as having two carucate of land as a berewick (supporting farm) of nearby Wirksworth. Callow Hall (not to be confused with Callow Hall at Ashbourne) is a moated site with a seventeenth-century gritstone double-bayed main farmhouse building constructed over a thirteenth-century undercroft.

Callow was one of the manors of the Duchy of Lancaster in the Middle Ages and was involved in a dispute between the Duchy and the Stathams of Morley, who had a tenancy at Callow. "30 mares, 30 Ox, 30 cows and 20 bullocks worth 100 marks were taken from Duchy of Lancaster lands at Morley, Callow and Wirksworth and (the Stathams) cut down John of Gaunt’s trees to the value of £100, dug in his mine, assaulted his free tenants and serfs, destroyed their tenements and practiced such oppressions at Ralph Statham’s court that many of his (John of Gaunts) tenants had left". Ralph Statham died on 13 June 1380 but his sons carried on their feud with the Duchy. On 20 June 1381 Philip of Okeover, one of John of Gaunt's knights with his retainers, struck back at the Stathams with an attack on their lands at Callow. This feud continued in an on-off kind of way throughout the 1380s, as it is recorded again, in 1387.

Callow was also one of the lead ore producing manors close to Wirksworth and in 1822 lead miners sinking a shaft at the Dream Mine, on Stainsborough Hill at Callow, discovered the remains of a prehistoric woolly rhinoceros.

== See also ==
- Listed buildings in Callow, Derbyshire
