= Biggin by Hulland =

Village in Derbyshire, England

Coordinates: 53.034°N 1.615°W

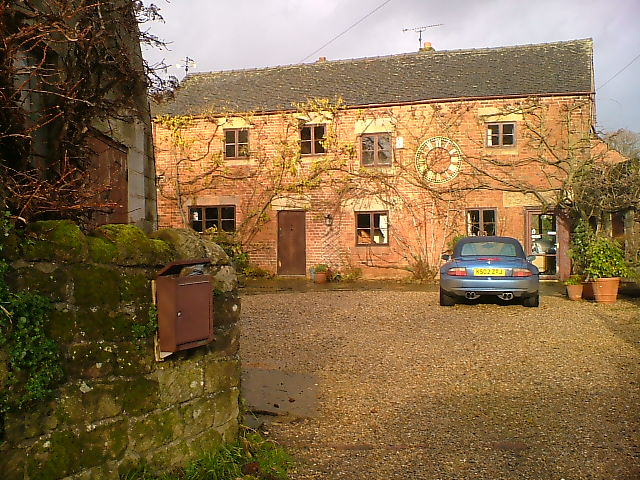
- Farmhouse, Biggin by Hulland.

- Location within Derbyshire
- Population: 120 (2011 Census)
- OS grid reference: SK259485
- District: Derbyshire Dales
- Shire county: Derbyshire
- Region: East Midlands
- Country: England
- Sovereign state: United Kingdom
- Post town: ASHBOURNE
- Postcode district: DE6
- Dialling code: 01335
- Police: Derbyshire
- Fire: Derbyshire
- Ambulance: East Midlands

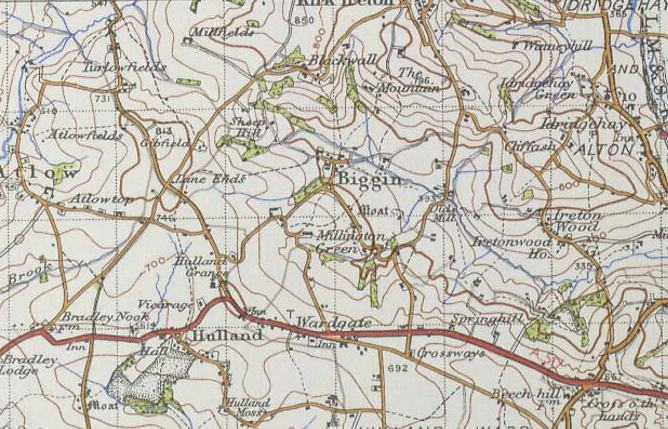
A 20th century historical map of Biggin, Derbyshire

Biggin is a village and civil parish in the Derbyshire Dales district of Derbyshire, England, near Hulland and just off the A517 road. In the 2011 census, the parish had a population of 120.

The village and parish are also known as Biggin by Hulland, as distinct from the Biggin in the Derbyshire parish of Hartington.

== History ==
In 1870–1872, Biggin was described as:

The township is in Wirksworth parish; and lies near the Cromford and High Park railway, 7½ miles SW of Bakewell r. station. Acres, 595. Real property, £1,153. Pop., 133. Houses, 28. The chapelry was constituted in 1848.Post Town, Ashborne. Pop., 399. Houses, 84. The living is a vicarage in the diocese of Lichfield. Patron, the Duke of Devonshire. The church is modern. There are two Primitive Methodist chapels and a national school.

Biggin is hidden away over a ford down a tiny track below Hulland village and, Brigadoon-like, it disappears when the mists lie low across the countryside; strangers to this area will pass by totally unaware of its existence.

== Census ==
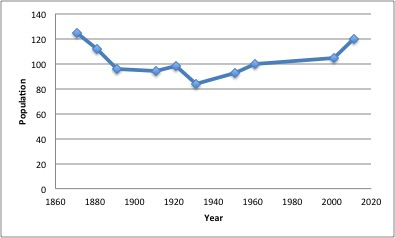
Total population of Biggin, Hulland, as reported by the Census of Population from 1881 to 2011

The population statistic of this village was at an overall steady rate as shown from the 'Biggin Derbyshire population time series 1881–2011'. From this time period, the highest historical population record of Biggin was during the year of 1881 with 125 people living in the area; while the trough point of Biggin's population was found in 1931 with 82 people only. After this period, the population trend had increased again to the year of 1961 onwards. In recent years, the population of Biggin has been rising shortly from 105 to 120 residents.

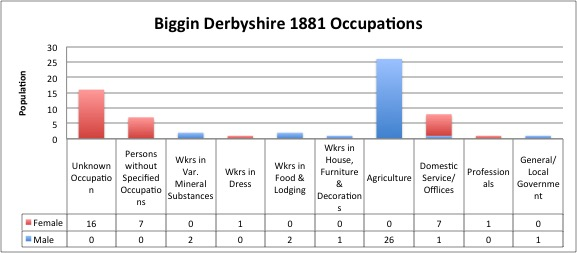
Total Occupations from both genders of Biggin, Derbyshire, as reported by the Census of Industry Occupational Data of 1881

The occupation statistic of Biggin, Derbyshire in 1881 from the bar chart shows that the industry of Agriculture was the occupation that flavoured most men with the total of 26 workers involved. However, there were no women contributed to this industry due to the heavy workload required that women could not be able to manage. On the other hand, the highest number of women job was the Unknown occupation that could not be conducted, this is the total of 16 of them.

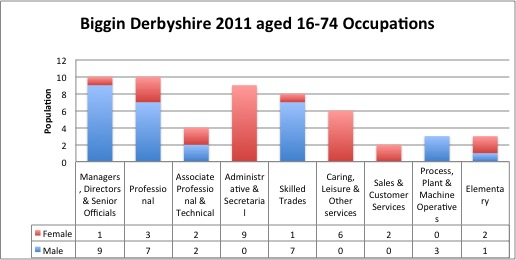
Total occupation of Biggin, Hulland, Derbyshire of both genders ages 16–74, as reported by the Census of Occupation from 2011

From the two graphs of Biggin's historical and modern occupations, there is a significant change of pattern identified. The occupation levels are much more widespread in both genders with the highest number of females working in the Administrative and Secretary industry and that the occupation with the highest number of males is the Managers, Directors and Senior officials. This result shows that as time goes by, the people of Biggin becomes more educated that enables both genders to work in more professional service industries nowadays. Not to mention, one of the evidence found in Biggin 1881 occupation still applied to the 2011 occupation that there are still no female workers involve in the industry of Process, plant and Machine Operative as it requires long working hours and heavy workloads.

== See also ==
- Listed buildings in Biggin by Hulland
