= Green Fairfield =

Civil parish in Derbyshire, England

Coordinates: 53.2511°N 1.8588°W

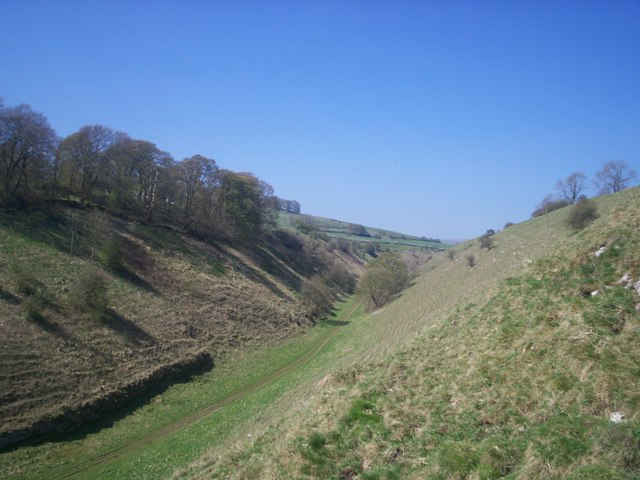
- Woo Dale

- Location within Derbyshire
- Population: 100 (2011)
- OS grid reference: SK090730
- District: High Peak
- Shire county: Derbyshire
- Region: East Midlands
- Country: England
- Sovereign state: United Kingdom
- Post town: BUXTON
- Postcode district: SK17
- Police: Derbyshire
- Fire: Derbyshire
- Ambulance: East Midlands

Green Fairfield (Old English Green, beautiful open-land). is a civil parish in Derbyshire, England. The population of the civil parish (including Tunstead) was 100. It is located in the Peak District, 4 miles east of Buxton and north of the parish of King Sterndale. Woo Dale lies within the parish. Green Fairfield's coordinates are 53.2511, -1.8588.

== See also ==
- Listed buildings in Green Fairfield
