= Thornhill, Derbyshire =

Village in Derbyshire, England

Coordinates: 53.348°N 1.704°W

Thornhill
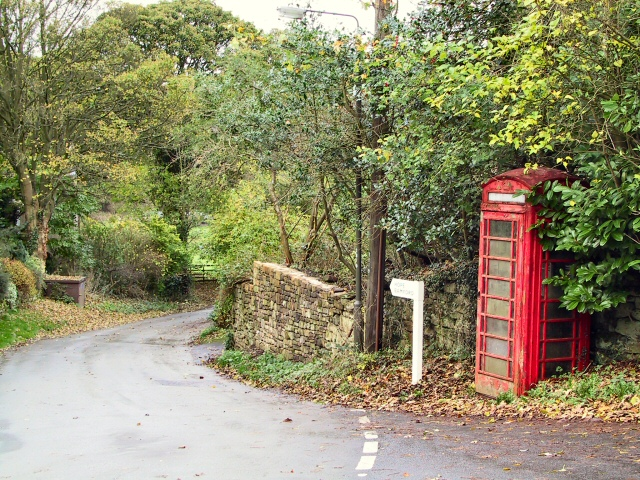
- Thornhill

- Location within Derbyshire
- Population: 147 (2021)
- OS grid reference: SK198834
- District: High Peak
- Shire county: Derbyshire
- Region: East Midlands
- Country: England
- Sovereign state: United Kingdom
- Post town: HOPE VALLEY
- Postcode district: S33
- Police: Derbyshire
- Fire: Derbyshire
- Ambulance: East Midlands

Thornhill is a village and civil parish in the county of Derbyshire, England, in the Peak District, south of Ladybower Reservoir and east of Castleton. The population of the civil parish at the 2021 census was 147.

== See also ==
- Listed buildings in Thornhill, Derbyshire
