= Pilsley, Derbyshire Dales =

Village in Derbyshire, England

Coordinates: 53.235°N 1.641°W

Pilsley
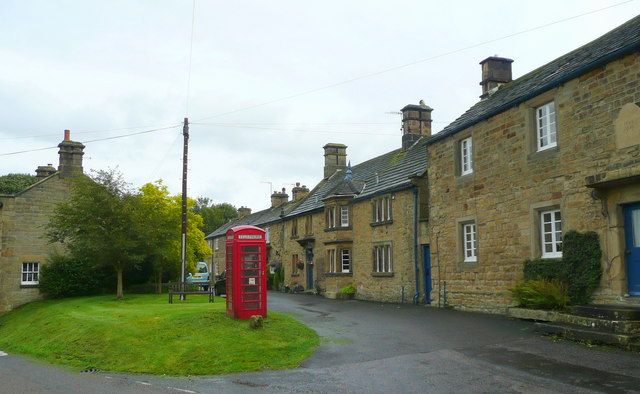
- Pilsley village centre

- Location within Derbyshire
- Population: 152 (2011)
- OS grid reference: SK240709
- District: Derbyshire Dales
- Shire county: Derbyshire
- Region: East Midlands
- Country: England
- Sovereign state: United Kingdom
- Post town: BAKEWELL
- Postcode district: DE45
- Police: Derbyshire
- Fire: Derbyshire
- Ambulance: East Midlands

Pilsley is a small village and civil parish in Derbyshire, England. At the 2011 Census the population of the civil parish was 152. It is close to Chatsworth and most of it belongs to the Chatsworth House estate.

== The village ==
The village has a primary school which was built by Joseph Paxton and extended in 1950 (kitchen), 1969, 1998 and 2002. Many of the pupils are the children of Chatsworth estate employees. The Wesleyan Chapel was converted into a computer room for the school in 2004. There is a pub with accommodation.

Pilsley is also the location of the Chatsworth Farm Shop, a business selling estate and British produce, which was established in the former shire horse stables in 1977 and was employing more than 100 people in 2005. A 90-seat restaurant was added in 2004.

== See also ==
- Listed buildings in Pilsley, Derbyshire Dales
- Beeley – another Chatsworth estate village
- Edensor – also a Chatsworth estate village
