= Listed buildings in Tideswell =

Tideswell is a civil parish in the Derbyshire Dales district of Derbyshire, England. The parish contains 31 listed buildings that are recorded in the National Heritage List for England. Of these, one is listed at Grade I, the highest of the three grades, and the others are at Grade II, the lowest grade. The parish contains the village of Tideswell and the surrounding countryside. Most of the listed buildings are houses, cottages and associated structures, farmhouses and farm buildings. The other listed buildings include a church, former schools, a hotel and a public house, a former Oddfellows Hall, and a library.

== Key ==
Grade	Criteria
I	Buildings of exceptional interest, sometimes considered to be internationally important
II	Buildings of national importance and special interest

== Buildings ==
Name and location	Also known as	Photograph	Date	Notes	Grade
St John the Baptist's Church; 53.27884°N 1.77256°W			14th century	The church has been altered and extended through the centuries, and was restored during the 1870s. It is built in gritstone with lead roofs, and has a cruciform plan, consisting of a nave with a clerestory, north and south aisles, a south porch, north and south transepts, a chancel with a sacristy, and a west tower. The tower has two stages with angle buttresses, a west doorway, above which is a five-light Perpendicular window, and on the south front is a clock face. In the upper stage are paired bell openings, over which is a corbel table, a moulded string course, an embattled parapet, and octagonal corner towers with crocketed pinnacles. There are also embattled parapets along the body of the church, including the two-storey porch.	I
1–3 Church Avenue; 53.27854°N 1.77327°W	Church Cottage		17th century	Three cottages, originally a house that was remodelled in the 19th century. It is in limestone with gritstone dressings, quoins, a moulded eaves band, and a stone slate roof. There are two storeys and three bays. The right bay contains mullioned windows and a doorway with a quoined surround. In the other bays are doorways with plain surrounds, and sash windows.	II
Markeygate House; 53.27796°N 1.77331°W			17th century	The house, which may have an earlier core, is in limestone with gritstone dressings, quoins, and a roof of Welsh slate and stone slate with coped gables and moulded kneelers. There are two storeys and three bays, the right bay gabled. In the centre is a flat-roofed porch and a doorway with a moulded surround. Some of the windows are mullioned, and some are later replacements. Inside the house is an upper cruck truss.	II
Eccles Hall (including boundary wall and gate piers); 53.27968°N 1.77333°W		—	c. 1720	The house is in limestone with gritstone dressings, quoins, a moulded eaves cornice, and a hipped stone slate roof. There are two storeys and attics, and a symmetrical front of five bays. The central doorway has a moulded architrave, a rectangular fanlight, and a segmental pediment on moulded brackets. The windows on the front are sashes, to the northeast are mullioned windows, and there are three hipped dormers. The boundary wall is in limestone with half-round copings, and the gate piers are square with moulded projecting caps.	II
The Old Grammar School; 53.27921°N 1.77293°W			c. 1740	The grammar school, which was altered and enlarged in the 19th century, is in limestone with gritstone dressings, quoins, and a Welsh slate roof with coped gables and moulded kneelers. There are two storeys and four bays, with buttresses between the bays, and projecting porches at the ends with flat roofs and chamfered copings. The ground floor windows are mullioned and transomed, and in the upper floor they are mullioned with hood moulds.	II
Hardy House; 53.27680°N 1.77589°W		—	c. 1750	The house is in limestone, partly roughcast, with gritstone dressings, quoins, and a stone slate roof with a coped gable to the south. There are two storeys and a T-shaped plan, with a front range of four bays, and a rear wing. The doorway has a moulded architrave, and a flat-roofed porch. The windows are mullioned, and in the rear wing is a tall stair window.	II
Foxlowe House (including gate piers and walls); 53.27801°N 1.77604°W			Mid-18th century	The house, which was remodelled in the 19th century, is in limestone with gritstone dressings, quoins, and a roof of Welsh slate, stone slate and tile, with coped gables. There are two storeys and a symmetrical front of three bays. The central doorway has a moulded surround, a rectangular fanlight, and a shallow bracketed hood. The windows on the front are sashes, and at the rear is a mullioned window. The boundary wall is in stone with saddleback copings, and the square gate piers have moulded square caps.	II
Foxlowe House outbuilding 53.27814°N 1.77574°W		—	Mid-18th century	The outbuilding is in limestone with gritstone dressings, quoins, and a Hipped stone slate roof. There are two storeys and two bays. It contains two doorways with quoined surrounds and massive lintels, one converted into a window, and in the upper floor are a sash window and a modern replacement.	II
Goldstraw Cottage; 53.27849°N 1.77342°W	Goldstraws		Mid-18th century	The house is in limestone with gritstone dressings and a Welsh slate roof. There are three storeys and two bays. On the front are coupled doorways and a lean-to porch. In the ground floor is a sash window and a modern replacement, and the upper floors contain two-light mullioned windows.	II
Lee Farmhouse and outbuilding 53.30416°N 1.80560°W	Lee Farm		Mid-18th century	The farmhouse and attached outbuilding are in limestone with gritstone dressings, the roof is missing, and the building is a ruin. The house has two storeys and three bays, and contains two doorways, one with a massive surround, and mullioned windows, and the outbuilding has four bays.	II
Property formerly occupied by 'Yesterday Antiques'; 53.27821°N 1.77273°W			Mid-18th century	A house, later a shop, in limestone with gritstone dressings and a Welsh slate roof. There are three storeys and two bays. In the ground floor is a 19th-century shop front with a recessed doorway. The upper floors contain two-light mullioned windows, and in the middle floor is also a single-light window.	II
Madeira House; 53.27820°N 1.77284°W			Mid-18th century	A house, later a restaurant, in rendered limestone with gritstone dressings and a Welsh slate roof. There are three storeys and three bays. In the ground floor is a modern shop window flanked by doorways with quoined surrounds, one converted into a window, and the upper floors contain mullioned windows.	II
The Anglers Rest, Millers Dale; 53.25703°N 1.78801°W			Mid-18th century	A private house, later a public house, it is in limestone with gritstone dressings, chamfered quoins, and a slate roof with a coped southwest gable. There are two storeys and three bays. The doorway has a massive surround and a hood mould, and the windows are mullioned with two lights.	II
Blake House; 53.27954°N 1.77413°W			1760	The house is in limestone with gritstone dressings, chamfered quoins, a moulded eaves cornice, and a tile roof with coped gables. There are three storeys and five bays. The central doorway has a moulded surround, a four-centred arched head, and a segmental pediment on moulded brackets, and the windows are sashes with moulded surrounds. In front of the house is a low wall with iron railings, and two pairs of square stone gate piers with depressed pyramidal caps.	II
White Cottage; 53.28020°N 1.77484°W	3 Market Square		1771	A pair of houses in limestone with gritstone dressings, chamfered quoins, floor bands and a tile roof. There are two storeys and two bays. In the centre are coupled doorways with a massive surround, heavy lintels and a hood mould, above which is a dated and initialled plaque. The windows are mullioned with two casements.	II
Bushyheath Farmhouse; 53.30330°N 1.78211°W			Late 18th century	The farmhouse, which was refashioned in about 1850, is in limestone with gritstone dressings, quoins, and a stone slate roof. There are two storeys and three bays. The central doorway has a shallow bracketed canopy, and the windows are sashes.	II
Bushyheath Farm barn 53.30347°N 1.78183°W		—	Late 18th century	The barn is in roughcast limestone with gritstone dressings, quoins, and a stone slate roof. There are two storeys and five bays. The barn contains a central segmental-arched cart opening with a quoined surround, taking-in doors in the upper floor, and three doorways with quoined surrounds and massive lintels.	II
The Flat; 53.27980°N 1.77474°W		—	Late 18th century	A house in limestone with gritstone dressings and a Welsh slate roof. It has three storeys and two bays. There are doorways with plain lintels on the front and left return, and the windows are sashes.	II
The George Hotel and outbuildings 53.27887°N 1.77191°W			Late 18th century	A coaching inn and stables, later a hotel and outbuildings, in limestone with gritstone dressings, quoins, and a tile roof. The hotel has two storeys and four bays containing Venetian windows. The central doorway has a moulded surround and an entablature. The outbuildings to the east have five bays, and contain a carriage entrance with a segmental head and a quoined surround, rectangular openings and quoined doorways.	II
5–6 Church Avenue; 53.27875°N 1.77333°W	Top House		Late 18th century	A pair of houses in limestone with gritstone dressings, chamfered quoins, and a Welsh slate roof. There are three storeys and three bays. On the front are two doorways, one with a moulded surround and a bracketed hood, and the other with a plain surround. Some windows are sashes, and the others are replacements.	II
The Old Bulls Head; 53.27807°N 1.77312°W			Early 19th century	A house with an earlier range at the rear, it is in limestone with gritstone dressings, and has a tile roof with coped gables and moulded kneelers. There are two storeys and an L-shaped plan, with a front of two bays. The central doorway has a moulded bracketed hood, and the windows are sashes.	II
The Vicarage; 53.27937°N 1.77338°W		—	Early 19th century	The vicarage, later used for other purposes, is in limestone with gritstone dressings, chamfered quoins, and a hipped Welsh slate roof. There are two storeys and three bays. In the centre is an open porch on square stone columns with a moulded cornice and a flat roof, the doorway has a rectangular fanlight, and the windows are sashes.	II
The Vicarage outbuildings 53.27921°N 1.77355°W		—	Early 19th century	Stables and a carriage house in limestone with gritstone dressings, a tile roof, and a single storey. On the side are four windows, two with shallow arched heads, the others with plain lintels. In the west gable end is a carriage entrance with a shallow ogee arch.	II
The Old College; 53.27980°N 1.77396°W			c. 1830	A pair of houses, later a school, and divided into flats in 1983, the building is in limestone with gritstone dressings, quoins, floor bands, and a hipped Welsh slate roof. There are three storeys and four bays. In the centre is a flat-roofed porch, and the windows are sashes. In the south wall and at the rear are doorways with quoined surrounds and heavy lintels, now blocked.	II
The Shambles; 53.27801°N 1.77324°W	formerly 'The Vaults'		1836	A house, later a shop, with an earlier core, it is limestone with gritstone dressings, quoins, a moulded eaves cornice, a shallow parapet, and a Welsh slate roof. There are two storeys and two bays. In the ground floor is a 19th-century shop front that has a central doorway with a fanlight, tapering timber columns with scrollwork capitals, and a bracketed fascia. The windows are sashes.	II
The Flat outbuilding 53.27983°N 1.77486°W		—	Mid-19th century	The outbuilding, converted for residential use, is in limestone with gritstone dressings, quoins, and a stone slate roof. There are two storeys and two bays. In the ground floor are a former segmental-headed cart entry and a doorway, the upper floor contains a former taking-in door and a window, and all the openings have quoined surrounds.	II
Bagshaw Hall; 53.27967°N 1.77484°W	Former Oddfellows Hall		1872	Originally the Oddfellows Hall, it is in limestone with gritstone dressings, vermiculated quoins, a moulded eaves cornice, and a hipped Welsh slate roof with finials. There are two storeys and three bays, the middle bay flanked by giant pilasters, and with a coped ogee gable and a finial, and containing a clock face. The central doorway has a four-centred arched head with a keystone and a fanlight, and above it is a two-light window. In the outer bays, the ground floor windows have two lights under a hood mould, and in the upper floor are single-light windows with round heads.	II
1–6 The Old School Close; 53.27966°N 1.77182°W	Former Church School		Late 19th century	The school, later used for other purposes, is in limestone with gritstone dressings, quoins, and a Welsh slate roof with coped gables and moulded kneelers. There is a single storey, and an irregular plan with gables, a main range of ten bays, an entrance porch, and a lower two-bay range to the southwest. The windows are mulliond or mullioned and transomed, and there is a gabled bellcote.	II
St Johns Institute; 53.27915°N 1.77262°W			Late 19th century	A house refashioned from an earlier building, it is in limestone with gritstone dressings, quoins, and a Welsh slate roof. There are two storeys and three bays, the outer bays gabled. In the centre is an arched entrance with a hood mould, and a two-light mullioned window above. The outer bays contain mullioned and transomed windows.	II
Tideswell Library; 53.27917°N 1.77251°W			Late 19th century	The library is in limestone with gritstone dressings, on a chamfered plinth, with quoins, moulded string courses, a Welsh slate roof with moulded gable copings and kneelers, and a cross finial. There are two storeys and attics, the doorway has a chamfered quoined surround, and a rectangular fanlight, and most of the windows are mullioned. In the gable apex is a niche with a decorative canopy flanked by lancet windows with trefoil heads.	II
St Anne's Church, Millers Dale; 53.25682°N 1.78953°W			1879	The church is in limestone with gritstone dressings and a Welsh slate roof. It consists of a three-bay nave with a tower to the west. The tower has two stages, a west doorway with a pointed arch, and a hood mould continuing as a string course. On the south wall is a clock face flanked by lancet windows with trefoil heads. In the upper stage are bell openings with two ogee-headed lights and a hood mould, above which is a moulded string course and an embattled parapet.	II
