= Listed buildings in Rowland, Derbyshire =

Rowland is a civil parish in the Derbyshire Dales district of Derbyshire, England. The parish contains two listed buildings that are recorded in the National Heritage List for England. Both the listed buildings are designated at Grade II, the lowest of the three grades, which is applied to "buildings of national importance and special interest". The parish contains the village of Rowland and the surrounding countryside, and the listed buildings consist of a house, and a pair of gate piers attached to an archway.

== Buildings ==
Name and location	Photograph	Date	Notes
Gatepiers and archway, Hassop Park; 53.24540°N 1.68226°W	—	Late 17th century	The entrance is flanked by gritstone piers about 12 feet (3.7 m) high, with a square plan and a pilaster on each side. To the left is a semicircular archway with voussoir and a coped parapet.
Rowdale House; 53.23388°N 1.69012°W	—	Late 17th century	A house and barn that were combined into one house in about 1984. The building is in limestone with gritstone dressings, and a Welsh slate roof with stone gable copings and moulded kneelers. There are two storeys, the original house has five bays, and the former barn has two. The main doorway has massive jambs and a lintel, and a bracketed stone hood, and to the east is a doorway with a chamfered quoined surround. There is one sash window, and the other windows are mullioned.
