= Listed buildings in Thornhill, Derbyshire =

Thornhill is a civil parish in the High Peak district of Derbyshire, England. The parish contains three listed buildings that are recorded in the National Heritage List for England. All the listed buildings are designated at Grade II, the lowest of the three grades, which is applied to "buildings of national importance and special interest". The parish contains the village of Thornhill and the surrounding countryside, and the listed buildings consist of farmhouses and farm buildings.

== Buildings ==
Name and location	Photograph	Date	Notes
Chapel Farmhouse and outbuildings 53.34800°N 1.70423°W		17th century	The farmhouse and attached outbuildings are in gritstone with quoins, and a roof of stone slate and Welsh slate with one coped gable. There are two storeys, and the farmhouse has a front of five bays. It contains a doorway with a quoined surround and a massive lintel, and one of the windows has retained the stumps of two mullions. In the outbuildings to the right are six doorways in the ground floor, and two windows above.
Barn north of Ryecroft Cottage Farmhouse; 53.34946°N 1.70534°W		17th century	A cruck barn, now converted to residential use, in gritstone with quoins and a roof of stone slate and Welsh slate. There are extensions on the north and south sides. Inside the barn are three cruck trusses.
The Farm; 53.34190°N 1.70372°W	—	Late 18th century	The farmhouse is in gritstone with a stone slate roof, two storeys and three bays. The central doorway has a stone surround, above it is a round-arched windows, and in the outer bays are two-light mullioned windows.
