= Listed buildings in Marston Montgomery =

Marston Montgomery is a civil parish in the Derbyshire Dales district of Derbyshire, England. The parish contains 19 listed buildings that are recorded in the National Heritage List for England. Of these, two are listed at Grade II*, the middle of the three grades, and the others are at Grade II, the lowest grade. The parish contains the village of Marston Montgomery and the surrounding countryside. The listed buildings consist of houses and associated structures, farmhouses and farm buildings, a church, and items in and around the churchyard.

== Key ==
Grade	Criteria
II*	Particularly important buildings of more than special interest
II	Buildings of national importance and special interest

== Buildings ==
Name and location	Photograph	Date	Notes	Grade
St Giles' Church; 52.93824°N 1.80065°W		12th century	The church was altered in the 13th century, and extended in 1875–77 by J. P. St Aubyn. It is built in sandstone, the nave roof is tiled, and the chancel roof is slated. The church consists of a nave, a north aisle, a south porch, a north vestry, and a lower chancel. On the west gable is a bellcote with swept sides and a pyramidal slate roof. At the west end is an early Norman window, with a blocked 18th-centgury opening below, and a clock face above. The south doorway is Norman, with one order of colonnettes, and an incised cross in the tympanum, and there is a blocked Norman doorway in the chancel.	II*
Marstonlodge Farmhouse; 52.94943°N 1.80015°W	—	Early 17th century	The farmhouse is in rendered close studded timber framing with a tile roof, and has additions in red brick with a moulded cornice, and a slate roof with overhanging eaves on scrolled iron brackets. There are two storeys, an L-shaped plan, three bays, and a staircase turret jettied on carved brackets. The windows are a mix of casements and sashes, and inside there is an inglenook fireplace.	II
Morledge House; 52.94100°N 1.79988°W	—	Early 17th century	The house, which was extended in the 19th century, is in red brick with vitrified headers, stone dressings and quoins on the early part, brick dressings on the late part, and tile roofs. The early part has a moulded string course, and a coped gable with moulded kneelers and a finial. There are two storeys, an attic and a basement, and one bay, and it contains mullioned windows under a continuous hood mould. Forming a T-shaped plan, the later part has two storeys and three bays. On the front is a porch with Tuscan columns, and the windows are sashes.	II
Waldley Manor Farmhouse; 52.93098°N 1.81221°W	—	1632	The farmhouse is partly timber framed on a stone base, and partly in painted or rendered brick, and has tile roofs. It consists of a range of two bays with two storeys, and a projecting cross-wing with two storeys and attics. On the north front of the cross-wing is exposed timber framing with close studding in the ground floor, and a jettied upper floor on four large brackets, and containing a dated plaque. The south front has been much altered, and contains a bay window flanked by bow windows. Most of the other windows are casements, and there is a blocked two-light mullioned stair window.	II
Banktop Farmhouse; 52.93179°N 1.80096°W	—	17th century	The farmhouse has a timber framed core, and was later encased and partly rebuilt in red brick. It has a tile roof, two storeys and attics, and a front of four bays. On the front is a two-storey porch, and a doorway with a four-centred arched head. The windows are casements, some with segmental heads.	II
Marston Park Farmhouse; 52.95001°N 1.80392°W	—	17th century	The farmhouse, which has been altered and extended, is partly timber framed, some of which is close studded, with the rest in red brick and sandstone, on a stone plinth, and it has tile roofs with moulded coped gables and kneelers. There are two storeys and attics, and an L-shaped plan, each range with two bays. The windows are a mix, and include mullioned windows, casements, and a sliding sash window, and some of them have hood moulds.	II
Pearl Bank Farmhouse; 52.93846°N 1.79994°W	—	17th century	The farmhouse has a timber framed core, and was encased in red brick in the early 19th century. It has a stone plinth, and an asbestos sheet roof with bargeboards. There are two storeys and attics, a double range plan, and two gabled bays at the front. The doorway and the windows, which are sashes, have segmental heads. Inside there is exposed timber framing.	II
Outbuilding north of Waldley Manor Farmhouse; 52.93126°N 1.81228°W	—	17th century	The outbuilding is in red brick with vitrified headers, partly rendered, and with some timber framing. The roof is tiled with a coped gable and moulded kneelers on the west. There is a single storey, a range of two bays, and a taller gabled bay on the west. The south front of the west bay is open with weatherboarding above, and the east wall is timber framed.	II
The Manor House; 52.93784°N 1.80216°W		Late 17th century	The house is timber framed with painted brick infill on a stone plinth and has tile roofs. There are two storeys and attics, a range of two bays, a projecting gabled cross-wing on the right, and in the angle between is a 19th-century two-storey bow window in brick. The gable of the cross-wing is jettied on carved timber brackets, the right bay of the range has a gable, and in the left bay is a gabled dormer. On the east gable wall is an enormous external chimney stack. The windows are casements, and inside the house most of the timber framing is exposed.	II*
Farm building, Marston Park Farm; 52.94964°N 1.80428°W	—	Early 18th century	A cowhouse, later a shed, it has been altered, and is in red brick with stone dressings on a chamfered stone plinth, with an eaves band, and an asbestos sheet roof. It contains blocked oval windows cut in square blocks. The north front has been rebuilt and contains sliding doors.	II
Pair of table tombs 52.93810°N 1.80064°W	—	Early 18th century	The pair of table tombs in the churchyard of St Giles' Church are in stone. Both tombs have illegible inscriptions, and slabs with moulded sides.	II
Table tomb 52.93803°N 1.80072°W	—	Early 18th century	The table tomb in the churchyard of St Giles' Church is in stone. On the sides are inscriptions, and on the top is a slab with moulded edges.	II
Daisybank Farmhouse; 52.94748°N 1.81395°W		Mid 18th century	A farmhouse and cottage combined into one house, it is in red brick with a floor band and a tile roof. There are three storeys and three bays. The doorway and the windows have segmental heads. Most of the windows are sashes, those in the lower two floors with keystones.	II
Outbuilding east of The Manor House; 52.93776°N 1.80189°W	—	18th century	The outbuilding is in timber framing and brick, with a floor band, and a tile roof with bargeboards. There are two storeys and three bays, the southern bay a gabled cross-wing. The doorways and windows, which are casements, have segmental heads, and in the gable end facing the street is a pigeon cote with two raised bands and square holes.	II
Thurvaston House; 52.94415°N 1.79804°W	—	Mid 18th century	A public house, later a private house, it is in red brick, and has a tile roof with moulded stone copings. There are two storeys and three bays. The doorway and the windows, which are casements, have segmental heads. In the upper floor is a bracketed signboard with the name of the house.	II
Waldley Farmhouse; 52.93028°N 1.81475°W	—	Mid 18th century	The farmhouse is in red brick on a stone plinth, with a sawtooth eaves band, and a tile roof with moulded gable copings. There are three storeys and three bays. The doorways and the windows, which are casements or sliding sashes, have segmental heads and keystones. Inside the farmhouse are inglenook fireplaces.	II
Dove House; 52.93808°N 1.80201°W		Early 19th century	The house was extended later in the 19th century by adding a cross-wing on the left. It is in red brick, the cross-wing has dentilled eaves, and the roof is tiled. There are two storeys, and a T-shaped plan, with a two-bay range, and a gabled cross-wing on the left. On the front is a gabled porch and segmental-headed doorway. The windows are casements; in the upper floor of the main range they have flat heads, and elsewhere they have segmental heads.	II
Rose Cottage; 52.93803°N 1.80131°W	—	Early 19th century	A red brick house with a tile roof, two storeys and two bays. The doorway and the windows, which are casements, have segmental heads.	II
Lychgate, shelter and wall, St Giles' Church; 52.93854°N 1.80080°W		Late 19th century	The lychgate at the northwest corner of the churchyard has sandstone walls, a timber superstructure, and a hipped tile roof with ridge crosses, and it contains wooden gates. At the southwest corner is a timber framed shelter with weatherboarding on three sides, a gabled tile roof, and a carved plaque on the western truss. The churchyard is enclosed by sandstone retaining walls with chamfered copings.	II
