= Listed buildings in Tansley =

Tansley is a civil parish in the Derbyshire Dales district of Derbyshire, England. The parish contains eleven listed buildings that are recorded in the National Heritage List for England. Of these, one is listed at Grade II*, the middle of the three grades, and the others are at Grade II, the lowest grade. The parish contains the village of Tansley and the surrounding area. Most of the listed buildings are houses, cottages, farmhouses and farm buildings, and the others are two former textile mills and a public house.

== Key ==
Grade	Criteria
II*	Particularly important buildings of more than special interest
II	Buildings of national importance and special interest

== Buildings ==
Name and location	Photograph	Date	Notes	Grade
Yew Tree Farm Farmhouse; 53.13467°N 1.53144°W	—	1623	The farmhouse is in stone with a tile roof. There is an irregular front with a coped gable and obelisk finials with small ball-heads. The front contains a mullioned window with a chamfered surround, and a dated plaque. On the east side is a gable containing a window with a moulded surround and a cornice, and a mullioned window. The west side has a later single-storey extension.	II
Barn, Yew Tree Farm; 53.13467°N 1.53113°W	—	Early 17th century	The barn is in stone and has a tile roof. It contains two doorways, one with a flight of stone steps.	II
Ivy House; 53.13168°N 1.51433°W	—	18th century	A stone house that has a slate roof with coped gables and kneelers. There are three storeys and three bays. The doorway has a square head and a cornice hood, the windows are sashes and between the upper floor windows is a wheel window. At the rear is a two-storey wing with a roof of old stone tiles.	II
Former George and Dragon Inn; 53.13200°N 1.51767°W		Late 18th century (probable)	The public house, which was extended in the 19th century, is in stone with quoins, and slate roofs with coped gables. The original part has three storeys and two bays. The doorway has a quoined surround, a deep lintel and a small cornice, and the windows are sashes. The extension, recessed on the left, has two storeys, and contains mullioned windows.	II
South View; 53.13221°N 1.51915°W		Late 18th century	A row of four stone cottages with tile roofs and coped gables. There are two storeys, four doorways with plain surrounds, six sash windows, and two rustic porches.	II
Tansley Wood Mill; 53.13709°N 1.53440°W		1783	The water powered textile mill, which was later extended, is now derelict. It is in gritstone with slate roofs and coped gables. There are three ranges with mainly three storeys, forming an asymmetrical U-shaped plan. The west range has six bays and a lower range. The east range is lower, and the north range has seven bays, a wheelpit bay with a hoist canopy, and a further two-storey six-bay range.	II
Knoll House; 53.13747°N 1.52050°W	—	1788	A stone house with quoins, and a slate roof with coped gables, kneelers and acorn finials. There are three storeys and three bays. The central doorway has a rusticated quoined surround, a double keystone, and a lintel with carved ornaments and initials, over which is a carved panel and a moulded cornice. The windows either have a single light, or are mullioned. In the middle of the top floor is an arched and dated niche with pilasters.	II*
Scholes Mill; 53.13555°N 1.52560°W		1797	The former cotton spinning mill is in gritstone with Welsh slate roof, three storeys and 16 bays. The windows have flat lintels with stone sills, and 30-pane cast iron frames with a small central opening. At the left hand is a stone chimney stack, and there is a taller one in brick at the right end. Adjacent to this is the manager's house, with two storeys and attics, and four bays. It contains a doorway with a rectangular fanlight and a larger entrance with an elliptical arch, and the windows are sashes.	II
Brook House; 53.13232°N 1.51971°W	—	Late 18th or early 19th century	A stone house with corbelled eaves, and a slate roof with coped gables and kneelers. There are three storeys and three bays. The house contains a plain square-headed doorway, and the windows are sashes.	II
Heathy Lea House; 53.13235°N 1.51143°W	—	Early 19th century	A stone house with coped gables and kneelers. There are two storeys, an L-shaped plan, and a front of three bays. The doorway has pilasters and a cornice hood on consoles. At the rear, the house incorporates part of an older single-storey house with a roof of stone tiles and a blocked doorway.	II
The Grove and the Beeches; 53.13291°N 1.51879°W	—	Early 19th century	A house that was later extended, then divided into two houses. They are in gritstone on a shallow chamfered plinth, with a moulded cornice, and Welsh slate roofs with coped gables and kneelers. There is an irregular L-shaped plan, with a west front of three storeys and three bays, and a two-storey bay to the north. Further north and recessed is a later range with three storeys, and two bays. The main doorway has a moulded architrave and a shallow cornice hood, and there is another doorway with a plain surround. The windows are sashes, and in the later range is a canted bay window.	II
