= Listed buildings in Pilsley, Derbyshire Dales =

Pilsley is a civil parish in the Derbyshire Dales district of Derbyshire, England. The parish contains twelve listed buildings that are recorded in the National Heritage List for England. All the listed buildings are designated at Grade II, the lowest of the three grades, which is applied to "buildings of national importance and special interest". The parish contains the village of Pilsley and the surrounding area. All the listed buildings are in the village, and consist of houses and cottages, a school and a telephone kiosk.

== Buildings ==
Name and location	Photograph	Date	Notes
Bradley House and Top House; 53.23600°N 1.64280°W	—	17th century	A farmhouse divided into two houses, it is in sandstone, with a moulded cornice, and a stone slate roof with a coped gable to the west, and moulded kneelers. There are two storeys, a T-shaped plan, and each house has three bays. Bradley House faces east and has a central doorway with a rectangular fanlight and a bracketed hood, and the windows are casements with hood moulds. Top House faces south and its windows are mullioned.
Middle Cottage, Duck Row; 53.23585°N 1.64019°W		17th century (probable)	The house is in sandstone, with quoins, and a stone slate roof with coped gables, moulded kneelers, and a finial on the northwest kneeler. There are two storeys and four bays. The doorway has a bracketed hood, and to its right is a full height canted bay window with a moulded cornice and a hipped roof with a finial. Elsewhere, there are chamfered mullioned windows.
East cottages, Duck Row; 53.23592°N 1.63997°W	—	Early 18th century	Five cottages, later reduced to two, in sandstone with a stone slate roof. There are two storeys and ten irregular bays. On the front are doorways and casement windows in various settings, including on in a former daoorway with a dated and initialled lintel.
West cottages, Duck Row; 53.23580°N 1.64046°W		Mid 18th century	A pair of cottages in sandstone on a chamfered plinth, with quoins and a stone slate roof. There are two storeys and five bays. The right cottage has three bays and a central doorway with a quoined surround. The left cottage has two bays and a doorway with a bracketed hood, above which is a datestone with a rounded top. The windows in both cottages are casements with chamfered surrounds.
Lane Side; 53.23602°N 1.64015°W	—	Early 19th century	The house is in sandstone, with quoins, and a Westmorland slate roof with chamfered coped gables and moulded kneelers. There are two storeys and two bays. The central doorway has a massive lintel and jambs, and the windows are mullioned with two lights and overhanging lintels.
Smithy House and wall 53.23534°N 1.64092°W	—	Early 19th century	A sandstone house with a Westmorland slate roof, there are two storeys, and an L-shaped plan, with a front range of three bays, and a rear wing. In the centre is a doorway, and the windows are sashes with plain surrounds. To the south is a curving garden wall with rounded copings.
The Farm; 53.23613°N 1.64053°W	—	Early 19th century	The house is in sandstone, with a moulded cornice, pilasters on the left and quoins on the right, and a stone slate roof. There are two storeys and three irregular bays. The doorway has a bracketed stone hood, and the windows are sashes.
Top House; 53.23497°N 1.63977°W	—	c. 1838–40	A sandstone house with quoins, and an overhanging Welsh slate roof with decorative bargeboards. There are two storeys, a T-shaped plan, and a front range of three bays. In the centre is a gabled porch with decorative bargeboards and a finial, containing a doorway with a segmental pointed arch and a slight chamfer. The windows are casements with arched lights, those in the upper floor in gabled half-dormers with decorative bargeboards.
Pilsley House; 53.23471°N 1.63940°W	—	c. 1840	The house, which is in Italianate style, is in sandstone, with moulded eaves on paired brackets, and has overhanging stone slate hipped and gabled roofs. It has an irregular plan, in one and two storeys, and has a south front of three bays. In an angle is a lean-to porch with a basket arch on stepped impost blocks. The windows are a mix of sashes and casements, some with mullions, and some with bracketed hood moulds.
Poole House; 53.23535°N 1.64123°W	—	c. 1840	A pair of sandstone cottages with paired bracketed eaves and a stone slate roof. There are two storeys, and a south front of two bays. In the ground floor are two Venetian windows, and above are sashes. The east and west fronts each contains a central flat-roofed porch that has a round-arched entrance with a keystone and bracketed copings, and sash windows, some with round-arched heads.
Primary school 53.23488°N 1.64043°W		1849	The school, designed by Joseph Paxton, is in sandstone on a chamfered plinth, with quoins, and a Westmorland slate roof with coped gables and plain kneelers. There is a single storey and a T-shaped plan. The south front has a projecting entrance bay containing a doorway with a chamfered surround, a fanlight and a hood mould, and above it is a sunken panel with the date. On the gable is a square bellcote with a stone base, an open timber superstructure, and a concave pyramidal roof. The outer bays contain recessed and chamfered mullioned windows. The west gable end is stepped and contains a First World War memorial clock, below which are memorial plaques to the two World Wars.
Telephone kiosk 53.23590°N 1.64038°W		1935	The K6 type telephone kiosk was designed by Giles Gilbert Scott. Constructed in cast iron with a square plan and a dome, it has three unperforated crowns in the top panels.
