= Listed buildings in Wheston =

Wheston is a civil parish in the Derbyshire Dales district of Derbyshire, England. The parish contains seven listed buildings that are recorded in the National Heritage List for England. Of these, one is listed at Grade II*, the middle of the three grades, and the others are at Grade II, the lowest grade. The parish contains the village of Wheston and the surrounding area. All the listed buildings are in the village, and consist of farmhouses, farm buildings and the village cross.

== Key ==
Grade	Criteria
II*	Particularly important buildings of more than special interest
II	Buildings of national importance and special interest

== Buildings ==
Name and location	Photograph	Date	Notes	Grade
Village Cross; 53.28475°N 1.80362°W		14th century	The cross, which has been moved from elsewhere, is in stone, and has a tapering shaft on a square base with chamfered angles, standing on two steps. The head is elaborately decorated, including carvings of the Crucifixion on one side, and of the Virgin and Child on the other.	II*
Vicarage Farmhouse; 53.28316°N 1.79871°W	—	1637	The farmhouse is in limestone with gritstone dressings, quoins, and a roof of stone slate and tile with a coped gable and moulded kneelers. There are two storeys and an L-shaped plan consisting of a front of four bays, the left bay projecting and gabled. The doorway has a chamfered quoined surround, and a dated and inscribed lintel. Most of the windows are recessed and mullioned, one with six lights, and most have hood moulds.	II
Outbuilding east of Vicarage Farmhouse; 53.28304°N 1.79842°W	—	17th century	The outbuilding has been altered, extended, and later used for other purposes. It is in limestone with gritstone dressings, and has a roof of corrugated sheeting with a coped gable and moulded kneelers at the west end. There are two storeys and ten bays. The building contains seven doorways with quoined surrounds and massive lintels, a full height opening with a quoined surround, and a lower double door in the ground floor, and three square openings above.	II
Bottom Farm; 53.28568°N 1.80455°W	—	Mid 18th century	A farmhouse incorporating an earlier core, it is in limestone with gritstone dressings, quoins, and a roof of stone slate and tile. There are two storeys, an irregular plan, and a front of two bays. Some windows are mullioned, and others are later casements.	II
Lyme Tree Farmhouse; 53.28339°N 1.79927°W	—	Mid 18th century	The farmhouse is in limestone with gritstone dressings, quoins and a stone slate roof. There are two storeys and a symmetrical front of three bays. The central doorway has a massive stone surround and lintel, and a shallow flat hood on moulded stone brackets. The windows are a mix of sashes and casements.	II
Upper Farmhouse and outbuildings 53.28394°N 1.80081°W	—	Mid 18th century	The farmhouse and attached outbuildings are in limestone with gritstone dressings, and roofs of tile, stone slate and corrugated sheeting. The house has two storeys and three bays. The doorway has a quoined surround, and the windows either have a single light, or are mullioned with three casements. The outbuilding to the left has two storeys and four bays, and contains doorways, windows, and three taking-in doors. To the right is a single-bay outbuilding.	II
Wheston Hall, gate piers and walls 53.28417°N 1.80257°W		Mid 18th century	A small country house, later a farmhouse, it incorporates 17th-century material, and was remodelled in the 20th century. It is in limestone with gritstone dressings, quoins and a tile roof. There are two storeys and six bays. One off-centre bay projects under a moulded cornice and parapet, and contains a semicircular-headed window with a keystone. The doorway has a moulded architrave and a pediment on moulded brackets, and the windows are sashes. The garden wall has saddleback copings, and contains square gate piers, each with a moulded band and a projecting moulded cap with a cone finial.	II
