= Listed buildings in Aston, High Peak =

Aston is a civil parish in the High Peak district of Derbyshire, England. The parish contains three listed buildings that are recorded in the National Heritage List for England. All the listed buildings are designated at Grade II, the lowest of the three grades, which is applied to "buildings of national importance and special interest". The parish contains the village of Aston, and is otherwise rural. The listed buildings consist of a house, a farmhouse and an outbuilding combined into a house, and a milepost.

== Buildings ==
Name and location	Photograph	Date	Notes
Aston Hall; 53.35203°N 1.72237°W		1578	A gritstone house with quoins, string courses, and a roof of Welsh slate and stone slate, with coped gables on the north, and a coped parapet with ball finials on the south. There are two storeys and attics, and an L-shaped plan, with a symmetrical front of five bays. The central doorway has a moulded surround, an outer chamfered surround, and a four-centred arch with leaf motifs in the spandrels, and the windows are mullioned. Above the doorway is a cartouche containing the date, and over this is a window with a moulded surround and a pediment with a small figure in the tympanum. There are also small figures in the north and east gables.
Highfield Head Farmhouse and outbuilding 53.35431°N 1.71445°W	—	17th century	The farmhouse and outbuilding have been combined into one house in gritstone with a stone slate roof. There are two storeys and a long plan of ten bays. On the front is a gabled porch, a segmental-headed cart entrance infilled with glazing, and a lean-to. Some of the windows are mullioned, and most are casements.
Milepost; 53.34064°N 1.71692°W		Early 19th century	The milepost is on the south side of Hope Road (A6187 road). It is in cast iron with a triangular plan, the upper part curving up to a point. The milepost is inscribed with the distances to Castleton, Chapel-en-le-Frith, Sheffield, and Hathersage.
