= Listed buildings in Gratton, Derbyshire =

Gratton is a civil parish in the Derbyshire Dales district of Derbyshire, England. The parish contains five listed buildings that are recorded in the National Heritage List for England. All the listed buildings are designated at Grade II, the lowest of the three grades, which is applied to "buildings of national importance and special interest". The parish is almost entirely rural, and all the listed buildings are farmhouses or farm buildings.

== Buildings ==
Name and location	Photograph	Date	Notes
Dale End; 53.14987°N 1.68590°W	—	1689	A farmhouse in gritstone with quoins and a Welsh slate roof. There are two storeys, an L-shaped plan, and three bays. On the front are two doorways, one with a chamfered quoined surround and an initialled and dated lintel, and the windows are mullioned.
Outbuildings, Dale End; 53.15003°N 1.68602°W	—	18th century	The outbuildings are in gritstone with quoins and a tile roof. There are two storeys and four bays. On the front are five doorways with quoined surrounds and stable doors, windows, and a taking-in door.
Gratton Grange Farmhouse; 53.15321°N 1.69017°W		Mid-18th century	The farmhouse is in gritstone with quoins, and a tile roof with coped gables and kneelers. There are two storeys and attics, a main range of three bays, and a lower two-storey range, partly roughcast. On the front are two doorways, one with a massive quoined surround, and blocked. The ground floor windows are sashes, elsewhere there is a mix of windows, some mullioned, and at the rear is a stair tower.
Lowfield Farmhouse; 53.15570°N 1.69934°W	—	Late 18th century	The farmhouse is in rendered gritstone and has a roof with coped gables. There are two storeys, four bays, and a parallel single-bay range at the rear. The doorway has a massive surround, most of the windows are mullioned with casements, and there are inserted sash windows.
Outbuilding, Gratton Grange Farm; 53.15305°N 1.68955°W		1853	An open-fronted cart shed, it is in gritstone with quoins, a narrow eaves band, and a tile roof with coped gables. There is a single storey and four bays. The columns are rusticated, and the lintels are massive, the middle pair inscribed with initials and the date.
