= Listed buildings in Biggin by Hulland =

Biggin by Hulland is a civil parish in the Derbyshire Dales district of Derbyshire, England. The parish contains eight listed buildings that are recorded in the National Heritage List for England. All the listed buildings are designated at Grade II, the lowest of the three grades, which is applied to "buildings of national importance and special interest". Apart from the village of Biggin by Hulland, the parish is entirely rural, and all the listed buildings are houses or cottages.

== Buildings ==
Name and location	Photograph	Date	Notes
Biggin Mill House; 53.02977°N 1.59784°W	—	17th century	The house is in gritstone and has a tile roof with chamfered coped gables and moulded kneelers. There are two storeys, and the doorway has a chamfered surround, a lintel, and massive quoins. The windows are mullioned, and some have been altered.
Home Farm Cottage; 53.03412°N 1.61516°W	—	Late 17th to early 18th century	A house in gritstone that has a tile roof and a coped gable and moulded kneelers. There are two storeys and two parts. The left part has a doorway and mullioned windows, with some mullions missing. In the right part is a central doorway with a quoined surround and a stone lintel, above it is a single-light window, and the other windows are mullioned.
House to the east of Hillside Farmhouse; 53.02736°N 1.61866°W	—	1709	The house is in gritstone with quoins, a string course, and coped gables with moulded kneelers. There are two storeys and three bays. The central doorway has a chamfered quoined surround and a massive dated lintel. The windows are mullioned, with some mullions removed, and in the east front is s two-tier stair window.
Biggin Old Hall; 53.02333°N 1.59467°W	—	Early 18th century	A brick house on a plinth, with gritstone dressings, a string course, and a tile roof with coped gables and kneelers. There are two storeys and a T-shaped plan. The central doorway has brick voussoirs and a stone keystone. The windows have small panes and top-hung casements, in the ground floor with voussoirs and keystones, and in the upper floor with segmental heads.
Biggin House; 53.03324°N 1.61405°W	—	Mid 18th century	The house is in stone on a moulded plinth, with Tuscan angle pilasters, a metope frieze, a moulded eaves cornice, and a tile roof with coped gables and moulded kneelers. There are two storeys and five bays, a rear wing and a later extension in brick. The central porch has a stepped and moulded surround, Tuscan pilasters, an entablature, and a metope frieze. The windows are sashes with moulded and stepped surrounds, and on the south front is a two-storey bow window.
Rose Cottage; 53.02817°N 1.61076°W	—	18th century	The cottage is in gritstone with a tile roof, two storeys and three bays. In the centre is a doorway with a quoined surround and a lintel, now blocked with a window inserted. The other windows are mullioned with two lights.
Duncote Farmhouse; 53.02859°N 1.60543°W	—	Late 18th century	The farmhouse is in gritstone, it has a tile roof with coped gables and moulded kneelers, and there are two storeys. The doorway has a quoined surround and a massive dated lintel, and to its left is a staircase window. The other windows are casements with stone voussoirs.
The Grange; 53.02963°N 1.62221°W		Early 19th century	The house is in red brick, the rear wall is earlier and in gritstone, and there is a moulded stone eaves band, and a hipped tile roof. The house has two storeys and fronts of three bays. In the centre of the entrance front is a doorway with a round-arched head, a fluted surround, and a semicircular fanlight. The windows are sashes with incised stone lintels.
