= Listed buildings in Offcote and Underwood =

Offcote and Underwood is a civil parish in the Derbyshire Dales district of Derbyshire, England. The parish contains twelve listed buildings that are recorded in the National Heritage List for England. All the listed buildings are designated at Grade II, the lowest of the three grades, which is applied to "buildings of national importance and special interest". The parish is almost completely rural and contains no significant settlements. Apart from a milepost, all the listed buildings are houses, farmhouses and associated structures.

== Buildings ==
Name and location	Photograph	Date	Notes
Green Farmhouse; 53.03117°N 1.69279°W		17th century	The farmhouse has a cruck framed core, and is now rendered externally. There is a single storey and attics, and four bays. In the centre of the front is a doorway, it is flanked by casement windows, and in the attic are two gabled dormers. In the west front is a fire window with a chamfered surround, and inside are two cruck trusses.
Ox Close Farmhouse; 53.02416°N 1.69982°W	—	Mid-17th century	The farmhouse is in limestone with sandstone dressings, quoins, and a tile roof with coped gables, moulded kneelers, and a ball finial. There are two storeys and attics, an irregular T-shaped plan, and a front of three bays. The central doorway has a surround of chamfered quoins and a lintel, and the windows either have a single light or are mullioned, some with hood moulds.
Sturston Hall; 53.01726°N 1.70067°W	—	17th century	The house is in brick, partly roughcast, on a chamfered plinth, and has a tile roof with coped gables and plain kneelers. There are two storeys and a T-shaped plan, with a front of three bays. The central doorway has a stone surround and a cambered head, and the windows are cross windows with moulded surrounds.
Offcote Grange; 53.02899°N 1.69648°W	—	Early 18th century	The house is in brick with stone dressings, dentilled string courses, an eaves cornice, and a tile roof with coped gables and kneelers. There are three storeys at the front, two at the rear, and a front of three bays. The central doorway has a quoined and chamfered surround, and the windows are sashes, those in the ground floor are tripartite.
The Green Hall; 53.02501°N 1.71887°W	—	Early 18th century	The house is in red brick with sandstone dressings, rusticated quoins, and a tile roof with coped gables and banded ball finials. There are five bays, the middle bay with two storeys, and the two outer bays on each side under a gable, and with three storeys. The gables are joined by a balustrade and a cornice. Five steps lead up to a central doorway that has giant rusticated pilasters, an entablature, a rectangular fanlight, and a bracketed segmental pediment. The windows are sashes with voussoirs and small keystones. On the south front is a round-headed staircase window with an oculus above.
Green Hall Cottage and outbuilding 53.02519°N 1.71865°W	—	1751	The house and attached outbuilding under one roof are in brick with a moulded eaves cornice and a hipped tile roof. On the building is a doorway and various windows, some with Gothic glazing, and some with semicircular heads. In front of the building is a mounting block, and on the southwest front are initials and the date in blue brick headers.
The Grove; 53.02564°N 1.70984°W	—	Late 18th century (probable)	The house is rendered, with parapets and a hipped tile roof. There are two storeys, a rectangular plan with polygonal ends, and a front of five bays, the middle bay canted. In the middle bay is a French window, and the other windows are sashes, those in the outer bays with pointed heads. The polygonal west end is embattled.
Sandybrook Hall; 53.03002°N 1.73497°W		c. 1815–20	A country house in rendered brick with hipped slate roofs. There are three storeys, seven bays on the front, five on the right return, and a two-storey three-bay service wing on the left. In the centre of the main front is a Tuscan Doric porch with an entablature, above which are sash windows. The outer bays form full-height bay windows, the middle window in the top floor blind. The right return has a pediment over the middle bay.
Stables, Sandybrook Hall; 53.03086°N 1.73517°W		Early 19th century	The stables are in brick with sandstone dressings and hipped tile roofs. There are two storeys, and are arranged around three sides of a courtyard. The western range has three bays, the middle bay projecting under a pediment containing a clock face. The bay contains a central segmental carriage arch with a banded stone surround, above which is a sash window with a stone lintel and keystone, and on the roof is a cupola. The outer bays contain semicircular-headed doorways with moulded surrounds and fanlights.
Walls and gate piers, Sandybrook Hall; 53.03057°N 1.73551°W		Early 19th century	The gate piers flanking the entrance to the drive are in sandstone, they are square and rusticated with pyramidal caps. The walls are in brick, about 8 feet (2.4 m) high and 500 feet (150 m) long.
Milepost; 53.00941°N 1.75391°W		1834	The milepost is on the south side of Mayfield Road (A52 road) and is in cast iron. It has a cylindrical stem, a wider cylindrical upper part, and a curved top. The stem is inscribed with the distance to London, the upper part with the distances to Leek and Ashbourne, and around the top are the date and details of the maker.
Farm buildings, Offcote Grange; 53.02884°N 1.69705°W	—	1870	The farm buildings to the west of the house are in red brick with tile roofs. They have two storeys, and are arranged round three sides of a courtyard. The openings are irregular, they include doorways and windows with basket arches and chamfered surrounds, and there are diamond-shaped and arrow head slit vents.
