= Listed buildings in Chisworth =

Chisworth is a civil parish in the High Peak district of Derbyshire, England. The parish contains six listed buildings that are recorded in the National Heritage List for England. All the listed buildings are designated at Grade II, the lowest of the three grades, which is applied to "buildings of national importance and special interest". The parish contains the small settlements of Chisworth and Higher Chisworth, and is otherwise rural. The listed buildings consist of four farmhouses, a house, and a barn.

== Buildings ==
Name and location	Photograph	Date	Notes
Hilltop Farmhouse; 53.42298°N 2.00351°W		1669	The farmhouse, which was extended in 1690, is in gritstone, with large quoins, and a stone slate roof with coped gables and moulded kneelers. There are two storeys and three bays. The main doorway has a chamfered and moulded surround, and an initialled and dated lintel. In the earlier part is a datestone, and in both parts the windows are mullioned.
Fold Farmhouse; 53.42211°N 2.00740°W		1697	The farmhouse is in gritstone, with quoins, and a stone slate roof with coped gables and moulded kneelers. There are two storeys and an L-shaped plan. On the northeast corner is a two-storey porch containing a doorway with a chamfered surround and a four-centred arched dated lintel, and two single-light arched windows with chamfered surrounds and ball flower motifs. Most of the other windows are mullioned, and on the west is a lean-to porch.
Fold Cottage; 53.42217°N 2.00707°W		18th century	The house is in rendered gritstone, on a plinth at the front, with painted stone dressings and a stone slate roof. There are two storeys, a double-depth plan, and two bays. On the front is a gabled porch, the windows are mullioned, and at the rear is a tall staircase window.
Sandy Lane Farmhouse; 53.42534°N 2.01506°W		Mid 18th century	The farmhouse, which was later extended, is in gritstone with quoins, and a stone slate roof. There are two storeys and three bays. An original doorway with a camber-topped lintel has been partly infilled by a window, and a later doorway has been inserted. Some windows are mullioned, and others are casements or fixed windows.
Barn opposite Fold Farmhouse; 53.42185°N 2.00744°W		Early 19th century	The barn is in gritstone with quoins, and a stone slate roof. There is a single storey, three bays, and a lean-to on the south. The barn contains a full height segmental-headed arch, a doorway, and vents.
Thornlea Farmhouse; 53.42220°N 2.00664°W		Early 19th century	A mill, later converted into a house, it is in gritstone with painted stone dressings and a stone slate roof. There are two storeys and four bays. On the front is a 20th-century porch, and the windows are mullioned, with three lights in the ground floor and two lights above.
