= Listed buildings in Mapperley, Derbyshire =

Mapperley is a civil parish in the Amber Valley district of Derbyshire, England. The parish contains three listed buildings that are recorded in the National Heritage List for England. All the listed buildings are designated at Grade II, the lowest of the three grades, which is applied to "buildings of national importance and special interest". The parish contains the village of Mapperley and the surrounding area. The listed buildings consist of a chapel converted into two houses, a farmhouse with an attached cottage, and a lychgate and walls.

== Buildings ==
Name and location	Photograph	Date	Notes
28 and 29 Church Lane; 52.98236°N 1.35413°W		16th century	A chapel that was altered in the 19th century and converted into two houses in about 1920. The building is in red brick, sandstone and applied timber framing, with sandstone dressings, on a plinth, with a tile roof. There are two storeys, and each house has a single bay. A doorway has a quoined surround, some of the windows are casements, and there is a three-light mullioned window with ogee-headed lights and pierced spandrels.
Mapperley Park Farmhouse and Cottage; 52.98426°N 1.36701°W		Late 18th century	The farmhouse and cottage attached to the right are in roughcast brick, and have a slate roof with coped gables. There are two storeys and four bays. On the front, the house has a gabled porch, and the cottage has a doorway. The windows are casements.
Lychgate and walls, Holy Trinity Church; 52.98198°N 1.35423°W		c. 1920	The lychgate has sandstone walls, a timber superstructure, and a gabled tile roof with bargeboards and a cross finial. On the western tie-beam is an inscription, and on the inside of the walls are plaques relating to those lost in the two World Wars. Flanking the lychgate are short stone walls.
