= Listed buildings in Ingleby, Derbyshire =

Ingleby is a civil parish in the South Derbyshire district of Derbyshire, England. The parish contains five listed buildings that are recorded in the National Heritage List for England. Of these, one is listed at Grade II*, the middle of the three grades, and the others are at Grade II, the lowest grade. The parish contains the village of Ingleby and the surrounding area, and the listed buildings consist of houses, cottages, farmhouses, and associated structures.

== Key ==
| Grade | Criteria |
|---|---|
| II* | Particularly important buildings of more than special interest |
| II | Buildings of national importance and special interest |

== Buildings ==
| Name and location | Photograph | Date | Notes | Grade |
|---|---|---|---|---|
| Ingleby Cottage; 52.83880°N 1.48175°W | — | 17th century | A pair of cottages later combined into one house, it is partly timber framed with brick infill, partly in sandstone, and extended in brick, and it has a tile roof. There are two storeys and a basement built into a hillside. The windows either have single lights, or are casements with two lights, and there is a small segment-headed fire bay window. | II |
| Elm Farmhouse and outbuilding 52.84012°N 1.48531°W | | 18th century | The farmhouse is in red brick, and has a Welsh slate roof, two storeys, and a symmetrical front of three bays. The central doorway, which has a rectangular fanlight, and the windows, which are sashes, have wedge lintels. Attached to the right of the farmhouse is a barn in stone and brick, with a tile roof. | II |
| Ingleby Toft; 52.83478°N 1.47444°W | | c. 1760 | A house in red brick with sandstone dressings on a chamfered stone plinth, with a dentilled cornice, a coped parapet with ball finials, and a hipped Welsh slate roof. There are two storeys and attics, and a symmetrical east front of three bays, the middle bay projecting under a pediment. Steps lead up to a central Tuscan Doric doorway with a traceried fanlight and a rusticated segmental pediment. This flanked by Venetian windows, above the windows are sashes in architraves with double keystones, and there are two roof dormers. The north front has four bays, and contains sash windows with wedge lintels. At the rear is a lower service range. | II* |
| Outbuildings west of Ingleby Toft; 52.83474°N 1.47516°W | — | Late 18th century | The outbuildings are in red brick with tile roofs, they form four ranges around a courtyard, and have one and two storeys. The north range contains a barn and hayloft and other rooms. The centre bay is gabled, and contains a garage opening, over which is a casement window, and a six-tier pigeon cote. To the left is an external staircase to a segmental-arched doorway. In the west range are seven stable-like doors. | II |
| Ash Farmhouse; 52.83838°N 1.47912°W | — | Late 18th century | The farmhouse is in red brick with a dentilled eaves cornice and a tile roof. There are two storeys and an L-shaped plan, the two ranges connected by a single-bay link. The west range has two bays, a porch, and windows with wedge lintels. To the left is a single-storey wing with a segment-headed doorway. The south range has three bays, and the windows in both parts are a mix of sashes and casements. | II |
