= Listed buildings in Callow, Derbyshire =

Callow is a civil parish in the Derbyshire Dales district of Derbyshire, England. The parish contains six listed buildings that are recorded in the National Heritage List for England. Of these, one is listed at Grade II*, the middle of the three grades, and the others are at Grade II, the lowest grade. The parish is almost entirely rural, and all the listed buildings are farmhouses or farm buildings.

== Key ==
Grade	Criteria
II*	Particularly important buildings of more than special interest
II	Buildings of national importance and special interest

== Buildings ==
Name and location	Photograph	Date	Notes	Grade
Callow Hall; 53.06283°N 1.60023°W		17th century	A farmhouse incorporating a 13th-century four-bay vaulted undercroft containing a hooded fireplace. It was modified in 1865, it is in gritstone, and has a tile roof with coped gables and kneelers. There are two storeys, a double pile plan, and four bays. On the front is a doorway over which is a datestone and an inserted sculpture. The windows on the front are sashes, and elsewhere there are mullioned windows.	II*
Sitch Farmhouse; 53.06072°N 1.61365°W	—	Late 18th century	The farmhouse is in gritstone with a slate roof and a stone ridge. There are three storeys and three bays. In the ground floor is a blocked doorway, an inserted doorway, and a sash window. The upper floors contain two-light mullioned casement windows.	II
Callow Carr Farm and stables 53.06541°N 1.58885°W	—	1790	The farmhouse and stables are under a continuous roof, and are in gritstone with a tile roof and two storeys. The house on the left has a projecting eaves band, two bays, a double depth plan, and a lower two-storey rear wing. On the front is a central gabled porch and two-light mullioned casement windows, and in the rear wing is a doorway with a dated lintel. The barn has a coped gable and kneelers on the right, and contains a door, mullioned windows, and vents. To the right is a lower cattle shed with two doors and three bee boles.	II
Round Meadow Farmhouse and outbuildings 53.07000°N 1.58945°W	—	1820	The farmhouse and outbuildings are under a continuous roof, they are in gritstone, and have a tile roof with coped gables and kneelers. The house has two storeys, a double depth plan, and two bays. On the front is a doorway with a massive quoined surround and a dated lintel, and mullioned windows. The outbuildings to the west contain a stable door and casement windows.	II
Callow Hall Barns; 53.06297°N 1.59920°W		Early 19th century	The barns are in gritstone, with projecting cornices, and tile roofs with coped gables, ball finials and stone ridges. They form two ranges at right angles, each with eight bays. The barns contain a doorway with a massive quoined surround and a dated lintel, various other doors and windows, and vents. On the east range are external steps at each end.	II
The Kennels; 53.06086°N 1.59067°W		Early 19th century	A gritstone farmhouse with a slate roof, coped gables and kneelers. There are two storeys, two bays, and a single-storey gabled extension to the east. On the front is a porch, above which is a single-light window. The other windows in the ground floor are mullioned with three lights, and in the upper floor are similar windows with two lights.	II
