= Listed buildings in Hognaston =

Hognaston is a civil parish in the Derbyshire Dales district of Derbyshire, England. The parish contains nine listed buildings that are recorded in the National Heritage List for England. Of these, one listed at Grade II*, the middle of the three grades, and the others are at Grade II, the lowest grade. The parish contains the village of Hognaston and the surrounding area. The listed buildings consist of houses, cottages, farmhouses, a church, and a telephone kiosk.

== Key ==
Grade	Criteria
II*	Particularly important buildings of more than special interest
II	Buildings of national importance and special interest

== Buildings ==
Name and location	Photograph	Date	Notes	Grade
Old Hall; 53.05085°N 1.65041°W	—	1611	The house is in gritstone, and has a tile roof with stone coped gables, kneelers, and ball finials. There are two storeys and a T-shaped plan, with a rear wing. The central doorway has a chamfered surround and a hood mould. Most of the windows are mullioned, some have a single light, and in the east gable end are casement windows with moulded surrounds.	II
Church Farmhouse; 53.05154°N 1.65013°W		17th century (probable)	The farmhouse, which was remodelled in the 18th century, is in gritstone with quoins, a moulded eaves cornice, and a tile roof with coped gables and kneelers. There are three storeys, a front of three bays, and a later rear wing. In the centre is a doorway with a moulded surround and a segmental pediment, with a tiered stair window above. The outer bays contain two-light mullioned windows with modern casements.	II
Knowl House and outbuildings 53.05215°N 1.65103°W		17th century	The house and outbuildings are in gritstone, with quoins, a tile roof, and two storeys. The house has two bays, and a rear wing in brick. Steps lead to the central doorway that has a quoined surround, a dated lintel, and a hood mould, and the windows are mullioned with two lights. The outbuilding to the left has irregular windows, of which is mullioned.	II
The Green Cottage, Rose Cottage and outbuildings 53.05381°N 1.64868°W		17th century	The cottages and outbuildings are in stone, and have a tile roof, and two storeys. There is a doorway with a stone lintel, and the windows are irregular. The main windows are two cross windows with mullions rising through two storeys. All the windows in Rose Cottage have been replaced, and the outbuildings to the right are under a continuous roof.	II
Green Farmhouse; 53.05382°N 1.65029°W	—	Early 18th century	The stone farmhouse has a tile roof with coped gables. There are three storeys and three bays, a twin-gabled rear wing, and a two-storey wing at the east end. The central doorway has a moulded surround and a flat hood on brackets. The windows on the front are mullioned with two light and casements.	II
Outbuilding, Green Farm; 53.05394°N 1.64994°W	—	18th century	The outbuilding is in stone, and has quoins, projecting eaves, and a tile roof. The building is stepped on a slope, and contains three doors on each side.	II
Brook House Farmhouse; 53.04893°N 1.64623°W	—	Early 19th century	The farmhouse is in gritstone and has a felt roof. There are two storeys and three bays. In the centre is a doorway, and the windows are sashes.	II
St Bartholomew's Church; 53.05204°N 1.65057°W		1879–81	Most of the church has been rebuilt in Early English style, retaining the 12th-century south doorway, and the 13th-century tower with its Perpendicular top stage. The tower is in gritstone, and the body of the church is in limestone. The church consists of a nave and a chancel, both with a north aisle, and a west tower with a massive west buttress. The tower has three stages, with lancet windows in the middle stage, two-light mullioned windows in the top stage, and an embattled parapet with gargoyles and pinnacles. The Norman south doorway has one order of colonnettes, chevron moulding, and a tympanum containing a variety of crude carvings.	II*
Telephone kiosk 53.05230°N 1.65139°W		1935	The K6 type telephone kiosk near the Red Lion Inn was designed by Giles Gilbert Scott. Constructed in cast iron with a square plan and a dome, it has three unperforated crowns in the top panels.	II
