= Listed buildings in Derby (Abbey Ward) =

Abbey is an electoral ward in the city of Derby, England. The ward contains 15 listed buildings that are recorded in the National Heritage List for England. Of these, one is listed at Grade II*, the middle of the three grades, and the others are at Grade II, the lowest grade. The ward, which is to the west of the city centre, is mainly residential. The listed buildings include a public house, a former toll house, private houses later used for other purposes, the lodge to a cemetery and three memorials in the cemetery, a former training college, former barracks, a church and associated structures, and an engine house and a warehouse built by the Great Northern Railway.

== Key ==
Grade	Criteria
II*	Particularly important buildings of more than special interest
II	Buildings of national importance and special interest

== Buildings ==
Name and location	Photograph	Date	Notes	Grade
Ye Olde Spa Inne; 52.91729°N 1.48370°W		Early 19th century	The public house, which has an earlier core, is stuccoed, the ground floor with engraved cement, and roughcast above. There are two storeys, the two right bays have coped gables, and to the left is a range with a hipped slate roof. The doorway has pilasters, a dentilled cornice, and a small hood, and the windows are sashes with cambered heads. There are later rear extensions.	II
315 Burton Road; 52.91064°N 1.49168°W		Early to mid 19th century	A toll house, later a private house, it is in red brick, painted on the front, with a slate roof, gabled at the front with ornamental bargeboards. In the ground floor is a doorway with a rectangular fanlight. The windows have pointed heads and hood moulds, and contain forked glazing bars, in the ground floor with single lights, and in the upper floor with mullions and two lights.	II
Woodlands Lodge and 107 Uttoxeter New Road; 52.91958°N 1.49214°W		c. 1840	A pair of stuccoed houses, later joined by a recessed single-storey link, and used as offices. They have two storeys and hipped slate roofs. Each part has a portico with Tuscan columns, and sash windows. Woodlands Lodge, on the right, also has a canted bay window.	II
Lodge, Old Cemetery; 52.91949°N 1.49353°W		1842	The lodge at the entrance to the cemetery is in stone, it has a slate roof with coped gables, and is in Gothic style. There is one storey and an attic, and an L-shaped plan, with a two-storey porch in the angle, containing a doorway with a pointed arch. On two fronts are canted bay windows, and the other windows are mullioned.	II
Diocesan Training College; 52.91980°N 1.49332°W		1850–51	The college, which has later been used for other purposes, was designed by H. I. Stevens, and was extended, including the addition of a chapel, in 1895–98. It is in red brick with stone dressings, bands of encaustic tiles, and roofs with coped gables, kneelers, finials, dominant chimney stacks, and timber framed dormers. Towards the left is a tower surmounted by a bellcote with a lead-roofed spire. The building is in two and three storeys with attics, and has an irregular plan. On the front is a two-storey porch with a parapet and ball finials, containing an arched doorway with a moulded keystone, and above it are two inscribed tablets. The windows are mullioned, and some also have transoms.	II
Monument to John Gregory Pike; 52.91869°N 1.49330°W		1854	The monument in the Old Cemetery is to the memory of John Gregory Pike, founder of the General Baptist Missionary Society. It is in stone and octagonal, with a chamfered plinth on two steps. On each face is a pointed arch that have columns with moulded capitals. On three faces are inscriptions, and above is a chamfered and moulded cornice, and a tall octagonal spire with lucarnes.	II
Lonsdale Hall; 52.91701°N 1.49883°W		1856	A house, later used for student accommodation, it is in red brick on a chamfered plinth, with sandstone dressings, floor bands, bracketed eaves, and a Welsh slate roof with coped gables and kneelers. There are two storeys. The entrance front has a gabled wing on the left, with a two-storey bay window. Recessed on the right is a three-storey entrance tower with a pyramidal roof containing a doorway with a segmental head, Gothic shafts, and a fanlight, above which is a round-headed window with a keystone, and a quatrefoil window. On the garden front is a two-storey canted bay window.	II
Former Derbyshire Rifle Volunteers' Barracks; 52.91913°N 1.49938°W		1859	The buildings of the former barracks are now used for other purposes. The buildings are arranged around a courtyard, and are in red brick with stone dressings and hipped slate roofs. There is a perimeter wall in red brick on a blue brick plinth with stone copings. Flanking the main entrance are square gate piers with pyramidal caps and an iron overthrow, outside which are single-storey guard houses. On the southwest side is a rifle range with a lean-to roof on cast iron columns. The main building is on the northwest, it has two storeys and seven bays, and contains casement windows. The officers' block on the northeast has two storeys, four bays, and single-bay wings, and contains sash windows.	II
Monument to Robert Pegg; 52.91869°N 1.49342°W		1867	The monument in the Old Cemetery is to the memory of Robert Pegg, a magistrate. It is in stone and polished red granite. The base is chamfered, and on it is an inscribed block. On this is a granite column with a moulded base, ring and capital, and on the top is a granite pyramidal roof. The monument is enclosed by ornate cast iron railings.	II
St Luke's Church; 52.91699°N 1.49091°W		1868–72	The church is in stone, and is in Early English style. It consists of a nave, north and south aisles, a chancel with a polygonal apse, and a southwest tower with a saddleback roof. The tower has slim angle shafts with foliated caps. The aisle windows are gabled, and at the west end is a rose window.	II*
Wall, gates and gate piers, St Luke's Church; 52.91717°N 1.49072°W		Late 19th century	The walls enclosing the churchyard are in stone. They include a gateway with a pointed arch, and another gateway with two pairs of wrought iron gates and stone gate piers.	II
Monument to Thomas Skevington; 52.91910°N 1.49363°W		1877	The monument in the Old Cemetery is to the memory of Thomas Skevington and members of his family. It is in Portland stone with dressings in polished red granite. The monument is square, with red granite columns on each corner, and pointed arches topped by gables with crockets and finials, over which is a square spire. On the southwest front is an inscription. The monument is surrounded by low coped walls on square steps. On the walls are ornate iron railings and corner piers with red granite half-spheres.	II
Engine House; 52.92144°N 1.48697°W		1877–78	The engine house, now disused, was built for the Great Northern Railway in Italianate style. It is in red and blue brick, on a double chamfered plinth, with a corbelled eaves band and a Welsh slate roof. There is a single storey, a two-storey square tower at the southwest, and fronts of six bays. The tower has an overhanging hipped roof on brackets, and contains round-arched louvred windows on three sides. In the middle of the north front is a round-arched double doorway flanked by segmental-headed casement windows. At the east end is a pedimented gable with a circular opening.	II
Railway Warehouse; 52.92210°N 1.48723°W		1877–78	The warehouse, now disused, was built for the Great Northern Railway. It is in red brick on a double chamfered plinth, with a moulded corbelled eaves cornice, and a Welsh slate roof. The building is in two and three storeys over a basement, and consists of a rectangular warehouse, and a triangular office block to the east. The warehouse has a south front of 21 bays with pilasters. In the centre is a segmental-arched entrance, and the windows are casements with segmental heads. The west front has six bays and a tripartite railway entrance. The windows in the office block are sashes with segmental heads.	II
Gymnasium and Studio, Diocesan Training College; 52.92058°N 1.49438°W		1914	The building, later converted for residential use, is in red brick, with a half-hipped tile roof, and is in Arts and Crafts style. There are three storeys, and seven bays divided by buttresses. The windows in the ground and middle floors have segmental heads, and the top floor contains double-height windows, three of which have gablets above. At the southwest corner is a semicircular stair turret, the upper part with canted sides, oversailing corners on brick corbels, and a candle snuffer roof with a metal finial. Elsewhere, there is a stair tower with a pyramidal roof.	II
