= Listed buildings in Aldwark, Derbyshire =

Aldwark is a civil parish in the Derbyshire Dales district of Derbyshire, England. The parish contains three listed buildings that are recorded in the National Heritage List for England. All the listed buildings are designated at Grade II, the lowest of the three grades, which is applied to "buildings of national importance and special interest". The parish contains the village of Aldwark and the surrounding area. All the listed buildings are in the village, and consist of a farmhouse, a former farmhouse, and a cottage.

== Buildings ==
Name and location	Photograph	Date	Notes
Ivy Cottage; 53.11351°N 1.66013°W	—	17th century	The cottage is in limestone with dressings in dolomitic limestone, quoins, and a tile roof. There are two storeys, two bays, and lean-to extensions. In the centre is a porch, and a doorway with a heavy lintel, and the casement windows have two lights and chamfered mullions.
Lidgate Farmhouse; 53.11360°N 1.65956°W		17th century	The farmhouse, which was later altered and expanded, is in limestone, with dressings in gritstone and dolomitic limestone, quoins, and roofs of Welsh slate and stone slate. It is in three parts, stepped down a hill, all containing mullioned windows. The west part has two storeys and attics, and a double-pile plan, the rear extension with two storeys. There are two bays, and a central doorway with a massive surround. The middle part has two storeys, two bays and a doorway with a plain surround, and the east part has two storeys and one bay.
Former farmhouse, Green Farm; 53.11351°N 1.66144°W	—	1686	The former farmhouse is in limestone with dressings in dolomitic limestone, and a tile roof with a coped gable and moulded kneelers at the northeast end. There are two storeys and two bays. The doorway has a surround of massive chamfered quoins, and a dated lintel. Some of the windows are mullioned.
