= Listed buildings in Allestree =

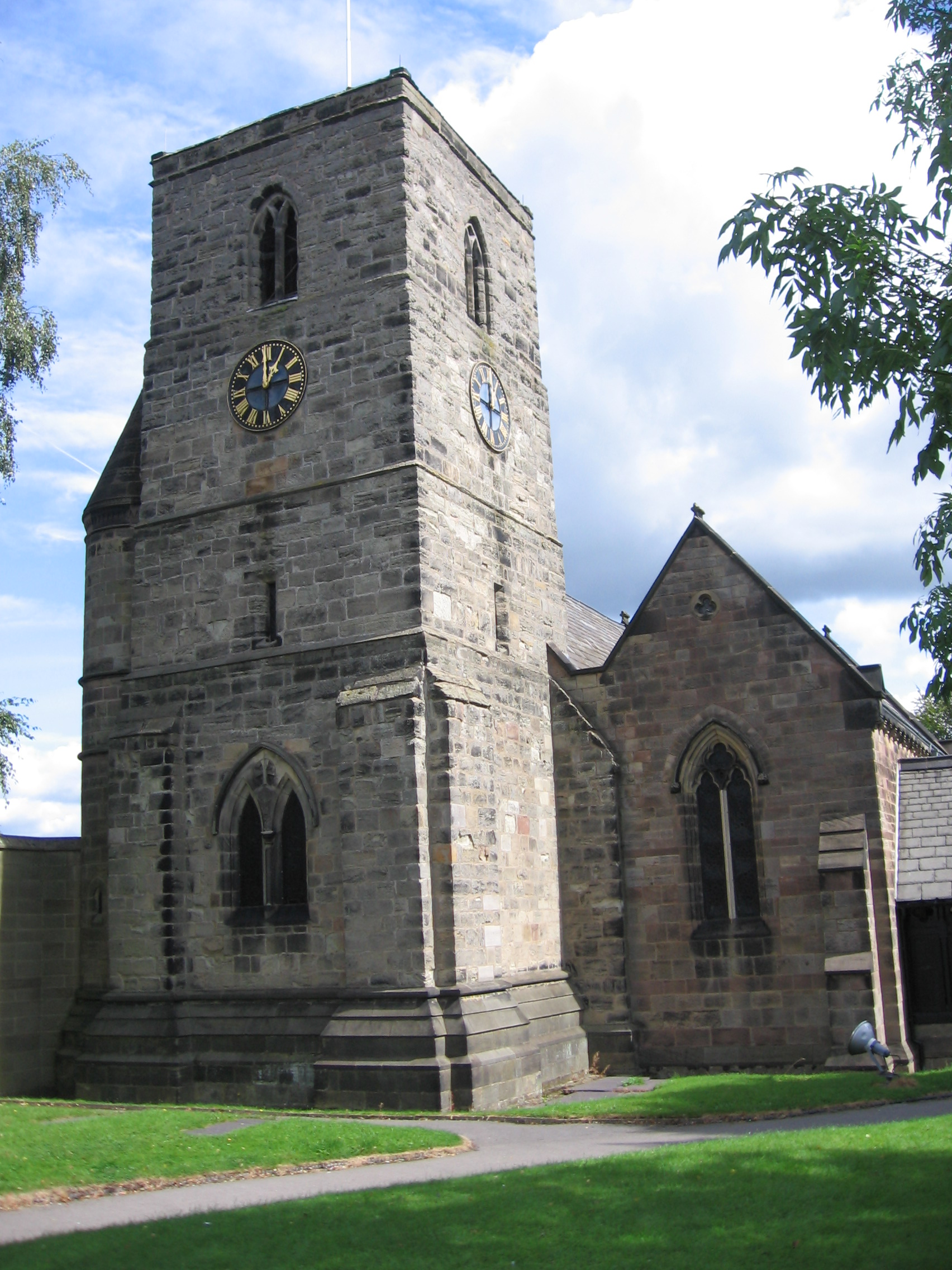
St Edmunds Church in Allestree Village

Allestree is a suburb and ward of the city of Derby, a unitary authority area, in Derbyshire, England. It is the northernmost ward and is situated on the A6 road, about 2 miles (3 km) north of Derby city centre. Of the 16 listed buildings in the ward, two are classified by Historic England as Grade II*, the rest as Grade II; Allestree has no Grade I listed buildings.

Allestree village is a conservation area, designated under section 69 of the Planning (Listed Buildings and Conservation Areas) Act 1990. Allestree's buildings are varied, reflecting its rural and historic nature, and include the old manor hall and associated ice house, the church, and local houses. Locally sourced stone for walls and slate for roofs are the predominant building materials, used for places of worship, the school, houses (including many not listed), and boundary dry stone walls.

Allestree Hall, a former manor house made of Derwent millstone grit, is in Allestree Park, a short distance from the village centre.

In the United Kingdom, the term "listed building" refers to a building or structure designated as being of special architectural, historical, or cultural significance. They are categorised in three grades: Grade I consists of buildings of outstanding architectural or historical interest, Grade II* includes significant buildings of more than local interest and Grade II consists of buildings of special architectural or historical interest. Buildings in England are listed by the Secretary of State for Culture, Media and Sport on recommendations provided by Historic England, which also determines the grading.

== Key ==
Grade	Criteria
II*	Particularly important buildings of more than special interest.
II	Buildings of national importance and special interest.

== Listed buildings and structures ==
Name and location	Photograph	Grade	Date	Notes
Allestree Hall; 52.9626°N 1.48568°W		II*	1802	A 19th-century former country house situated in Allestree Park, the house was begun by Bache Thornhill was completed by John Giradot (High Sheriff of Derbyshire) with three storeys and five bays, the central three bowed with an ionic columned porch. The hall was included in the English Heritage At Risk Register 2010, which states that the internal condition of the building is poor but fair overall. The city and English Heritage are looking to find a suitable scheme to enable its redevelopment.
10 Cornhill; 52.954389°N 1.4852436°W		II	16th century	Red-brick cottage
Village Pump; 52.954297°N 1.4847089°W		II	19th century	Cast iron pump with sandstone block
8 Cornhill; 52.954577°N 1.4850628°W		II	Late 18th century/early 19th century	Two-storey cottage
11–15 Cornhill; 52.954357°N 1.4861669°W		II	18th century	Much-altered red-brick house
The Hollies Farmhouse; 52.953531°N 1.4904336°W		II	17th century	Much-altered red-brick house
St Edmunds Church; 52.953681°N 1.4835701°W		II*	13th century with later additions and rebuilt in 1865–66	The church dates from the 12th century but has been added to and rebuilt. All that remains of the original building is the 12th-century south door which still features some of the original carvings. The tower is between 13th and 15th century and features a round clock made in 1853 by John Whitehurst of Derby. The church was largely rebuilt in the 19th century by local architects Stevens and Robinson but retains original architectural character.
Ice House at Allestree Hall; 52.962082°N 1.4868644°W		II	Early 18th century	Built to serve the family at Allestree Hall an underground ice house, circular in shape with access chute to the north.
The Red Cow Inn; 52.953377°N 1.4838714°W		II	Late 18th century/early 19th century	Painted two-storey brick public house. The Red Cow inn was shown on a 1737 map of the village and it has probably existed since the 17th century. The current building is later and has been added to.
Yew Tree Cottage; 52.954493°N 1.4864183°W		II	17th century	Timber-framed house
Old School House; 52.954430°N 1.4863149°W		II	Early 19th century	Red-brick two-storey schoolhouse
The Farm; 52.935709°N 1.5085417°W		II	Late 18th century/early 19th century	Modest farm cottage
Former Toll House; 52.937541°N 1.5014980°W		II	c 1863	Two-storey former toll house. It was once part of the Markeaton estate and replaced the cottage used to collect tolls on the turnpike trust road
Home Farm House; 52.935680°N 1.5079469°W		II	18th century	Red-brick two-storey house
The Green; 52.935950°N 1.5079736°W		II	Late 18th century/early 19th century	Formerly two cottages, now a single property
Conservatory at Markeaton Park; 52.934752°N 1.5053388°W		II	1772	Designed by Joseph Pickford of Derby for the Mundy family. Originally adjacent to Markeaton Hall, which was demolished in 1964. The building was initially built to house tender plants but was also the estate office in the early 19th century and now hosts a café. The Orangery was developed by Derby City Council to become a focal point of the park.
