= Listed buildings in Padfield =

Padfield is a village in the High Peak district of Derbyshire, England. The village contains five listed buildings that are recorded in the National Heritage List for England. All the listed buildings are designated at Grade II, the lowest of the three grades, which is applied to "buildings of national importance and special interest". The listed buildings consist of houses, farmhouses and farm buildings.

== Buildings ==
Name and location	Photograph	Date	Notes
Padfield Brook Farmhouse; 53.46182°N 1.95226°W	—	Late 17th century	A farmhouse, later a private house, in millstone grit, with quoins, and a stone slate roof with kneelers. There are two storeys and an L-shaped plan. On the garden front is a doorway with a chamfered surround and a shaped lintel. This is flanked by bow windows, and the windows elsewhere are casements, some with mullions.
Padfield; 53.46333°N 1.95646°W	—	1669	A house and stable, later combined into a house, it is in millstone grit with a stone slate roof. There are two storeys and an irregular plan. In the centre is a tall doorway with a chamfered surround, and to the left is a blocked doorway with a large inscribed and dated lintel. The windows are a mix of sashes and casements.
Little Padfield Farmhouse; 53.46192°N 1.95187°W		Late 17th century	The farmhouse, later a private house, is in millstone grit with a stone slate roof. There are two storeys, five bays, and a rear outshut with a catslide roof. The windows have been altered, and include two bow windows on the front, casements in the upper floor, and a dormer at the rear.
Lower Cross Farm and barn 53.46365°N 1.95584°W		Mid 18th century	A pair of houses with a barn at the rear, in millstone grit, with a coped parapet, and stone slate roofs. There are two storeys and a front of seven bays. The right doorway is round-headed and has a fanlight and a hood on brackets. On the left is a blocked doorway with pilasters, to its right is a doorway with a flush surround under a stair window, and the other windows on the front are bow windows. At the rear is a three-light mullioned window, and a round-headed staircase window with a keystone. The barn has various openings, some with segmental heads, and slit vents.
Top of th'ill Farmhouse, barn and stable 53.45908°N 1.95816°W		Late 18th century	The farmhouse and attached buildings are in millstone grit, with quoins and roofs of Welsh slate and stone slate. There are two storeys, and the farmhouse has a front of five irregular bays, and a lean-to on the right. On the front is a projecting single-storey lean-to porch, and the windows are mullioned with two or three lights. To the left is a slightly projecting barn containing a cart entrance with a segmental arch, and a blocked doorway with rusticated jambs and vents, and to its left is a lean-to.
