= Listed buildings in Flagg, Derbyshire =

Flagg is a civil parish in the Derbyshire Dales district of Derbyshire, England. The parish contains four listed buildings that are recorded in the National Heritage List for England. Of these, two are listed at Grade II*, the middle of the three grades, and the others are at Grade II, the lowest grade. The parish contains the village of Flagg and the surrounding area, and the listed buildings consist of two farmhouses and associated structures.

== Key ==
Grade	Criteria
II*	Particularly important buildings of more than special interest
II	Buildings of national importance and special interest

== Buildings ==
Name and location	Photograph	Date	Notes	Grade
Old Farmhouse, Town Head Farm; 53.21808°N 1.80842°W		1639	The farmhouse is in limestone with gritstone dressings, quoins, and a tile roof. There are two storeys, a T-shaped plan, and a front of three bays. The doorway has a quoined surround, a four-centred arched lintel, and a hood mould. Most of the windows have moulded surrounds, some with hood moulds. Under the eaves is a datestone.	II*
Outbuilding northwest of Flagg Hall; 53.21341°N 1.79545°W	—	17th century	The outbuilding is in limestone with gritstone dressings, quoins, and a tile roof. There are two storeys and three bays. It contains two doorways with chamfered quoined surrounds and massive lintels, and mullioned windows.	II
Flagg Hall; 53.21328°N 1.79534°W	—	Late 17th century	A manor house, later a farmhouse, in rendered stone and limestone, with gritstone dressings, quoins, moulded string courses, and a roof of tile and stone slate, with coped gables and moulded kneelers. There are three storeys and attics, a double-pile plan and three bays. On the front are two gables, a central porch with a rusticated semicircular-arched surround and a massive keystone. Above the arch is a moulded cornice and a balustrade. The doorway has moulded jambs and imposts, a large lintel with a central boss. Most of the windows are mullioned.	II*
Stables and barn west of Flagg Hall; 53.21323°N 1.79592°W	—	1681	The stables and barn were altered and extended in the 19th century. They are in limestone with gritstone dressings, a roof in tile and stone slate, and two storeys. The early part has a plinth and quoins, and three bays, and the later part has four bays. In the earlier part is a semicircular archway with a quoined surround and voussoirs, above which is a dated and initialled plaque, and mullioned windows with a continuous hood mould. In both parts there are doorways with quoined surrounds and hayloft doors.	II
