= Listed buildings in Green Fairfield =

Green Fairfield is a civil parish in the High Peak district of Derbyshire, England. The parish contains five listed buildings that are recorded in the National Heritage List for England. All the listed buildings are designated at Grade II, the lowest of the three grades, which is applied to "buildings of national importance and special interest". The parish is entirely rural, and the listed buildings consist of a house, Pictor Hall, its lodge and two outbuildings, and a farmhouse.

== Buildings ==
Name and location	Photograph	Date	Notes
Bottom Farmhouse; 53.25168°N 1.85388°W	—	c. 1750	The farmhouse is in limestone with gritstone dressings, quoins, and a stone slate roof. There are two storeys and four bays. The main doorway has a moulded surround and a shallow bracketed hood. The windows either have single lights or are mullioned, some with hood moulds.
Pictor Hall; 53.24906°N 1.86655°W		Late 18th century	The house, which incorporates 17th-century material, was extended in the mid-19th century. It is in rendered limestone and gritstone, with quoins, and a stone slate roof with coped gables. There are two storeys, a double-depth plan, and a front of five bays, with a central pediment, and a later two-storey canted wing with a hipped roof and overhanging eaves on the southwest. The doorway has a quoined surround and a shallow bracketed canopy, and the windows are sashes.
Barn northwest of Pictor Hall; 53.24922°N 1.86619°W	—	1794	The barn is in limestone with gritstone dressings, and a stone slate roof with coped gables, a ball finial at the northeast end, and a bellcote at the southwest. There are two storeys and four bays. The barn contains five doorways with quoined surrounds and massive lintels, and four taking-in doorways in the upper floor with quoined surrounds.
Lodge to Pictor Hall; 53.24982°N 1.86182°W		Early 19th century	The lodge is in limestone with gritstone dressings, quoins, and a Welsh slate roof. There is a single storey and an attic, and three bays, the middle bay gabled. In the centre is a doorway flanked by windows, and above it is a gabled dormer. The windows contain Y-tracery, and all the openings have pointed heads and hood moulds.
Outbuilding north-northeast of Pictor Hall; 53.24924°N 1.86644°W	—	Early 19th century	The outbuilding is in limestone with gritstone dressings, rusticated quoins, and a stone slate roof with coped gables. There are two storeys and three bays, and a single-storey range at the north. The building contains two doorways with quoined surrounds, one also with a massive lintel. Most of the windows, which were sashes, have been replaced.
