= Listed buildings in Hazlebadge =

Hazlebadge is a civil parish in the Derbyshire Dales district of Derbyshire, England. The parish contains four listed buildings that are recorded in the National Heritage List for England. Of these, one is listed at Grade II*, the middle of the three grades, and the others are at Grade II, the lowest grade. The parish is almost entirely rural, and the listed buildings consist of farmhouses and farm buildings.

== Key ==
Grade	Criteria
II*	Particularly important buildings of more than special interest
II	Buildings of national importance and special interest

== Buildings ==
Name and location	Photograph	Date	Notes	Grade
Hazlebadge Hall; 53.31668°N 1.74366°W		1549	A surviving cross-wing of a larger building and later a farmhouse, it is in rendered stone with gritstone dressings, quoins, and a slate roof. There are two storeys and a single gabled bay. This contains mullioned windows with hood moulds, containing six lights in the ground floor and five in the upper floor, each light with a four-centred arched head and incised spandrels. Above the windows in the gable is a crest and a coat of arms carved in relief, flanked by inscribed plaques, one dated. In the south front is a doorway with a chamfered surround, and mullioned windows.	II*
Barn north of Hazlebadge Hall; 53.31684°N 1.74370°W		16th century	The barn is in limestone and gritstone with gritstone dressings, quoins, and a stone slate roof. It is partly in two storeys and partly in one, and has six bays, the two northern bays projecting under a catslide roof. The openings include doorways with chamfered quoined surrounds and four-centred arched heads, rectangular vents, and square hayloft openings.	II
Hartlemoor Farmhouse; 53.32077°N 1.75599°W		17th century	The farmhouse is in limestone with gritstone dressings, quoins, and a slate roof. There are two storeys and three bays. On the front is a doorway with a quoined surround, and to the west is a doorway with a four-centred arched head. The windows are mullioned, and over the west door is a stone shield.	II
Hazlebadge Farmhouse and barn 53.31619°N 1.74344°W		Early 19th century	The farmhouse and barn are in limestone, partly rendered, with stone slate roofs, and two storeys. The farmhouse has two storeys and two bays. On the front is a doorway, and three-light mullioned windows with pointed lights, incised spandrels, and Tudor-style hood moulds. Attached to the west is a four-bay barn containing arched doors, windows, and four square hayloft doors with slit vents between.	II
