= Listed buildings in Carsington =

Carsington is a civil parish in the Derbyshire Dales district of Derbyshire, England. The parish contains 18 listed buildings that are recorded in the National Heritage List for England. Of these, one is listed at Grade II*, the middle of the three grades, and the others are at Grade II, the lowest grade. The parish contains the village of Carsington and the surrounding countryside. Most of the listed buildings are houses, cottages, farmhouses and farm buildings, and the others consist of a village cross, a church, a public house, and a school,

== Key ==
Grade	Criteria
II*	Particularly important buildings of more than special interest
II	Buildings of national importance and special interest

== Buildings ==
Name and location	Photograph	Date	Notes	Grade
Village cross 53.07717°N 1.62528°W		14th to 15th century	The village cross is on The Green, and is in gritstone. It has a circular plinth and a base of three steps, on which are the remains of a polygonal shaft.	II
St Margaret's Church; 53.07753°N 1.62465°W		1648	The church was refurbished in 1873 when the porch was also added. The church is in limestone with gritstone dressings, stepped buttresses in the centre and on the corners of the south wall, an embattled pediment and a slate roof. It consists of a nave and a chancel in one cell, a south porch, a north vestry, and a bellcote on the west end. The porch has a coped gable and a moulded pointed arch. On the south wall is a dated sundial, and two three-light windows, the lights with cusped heads.	II*
Glebe House; 53.07693°N 1.62554°W		17th century	The house, which was extended in the 19th century, is in gritstone, with a string course and a tile roof. There are two storeys and an L-shaped plan, with a main range of four bays, a later gabled projection, and a single-storey extension to the east. The doorway has a quoined surround, and the windows are mullioned, most with casements.	II
Townend Cottage; 53.07807°N 1.62737°W		17th century	The farmhouse, which was extended to the west in the 19th century, is in limestone with gritstone dressings, quoins, a projecting eaves band, and a slate roof with moulded gable copings and kneelers at the east end. There are two storeys and attics, and three bays. The doorway has a quoined surround and a massive chamfered lintel, and there is another doorway in the extension. Most of the windows are mullioned with casements. The garden wall is in limestone with dressed copings, quoins and gate piers.	II
White House; 53.06804°N 1.65213°W		17th century	The house, which was much altered in the 18th century, has its lower parts in limestone, its upper storey in gritstone, and a tiled roof. There are two storeys and four bays. On the front is a porch, and the windows are mullioned with casements.	II
Farmbuildings southeast of Sunnyside; 53.07846°N 1.62848°W		Late 17th century	The farm buildings, of which the east range was formerly a house, are in stone with quoins, an eaves band, and a slate roof with coped gables and kneelers. There are two storeys and two ranges at right angles. In the east range are two doorways with massive quoined surrounds, blocked mullioned windows, and loft doors. At the rear is an external staircase.	II
Repton Cottage; 53.07794°N 1.62705°W		Early 18th century	A farmhouse in limestone with quoins and a slate roof. There are two storeys, three bays, and a later rear extension. The doorway in the right bay has a hood on brackets, and the windows are mullioned with two lights.	II
Carsington and Hopton Primary School; 53.07639°N 1.62377°W	—	1726	The school is in limestone with gritstone dressings, a moulded eaves cornice, and a hipped slate roof. There is a single storey, and a T-shaped plan with a later rear extension. The north front has a shallow plinth, and contains five tall mullioned and transomed windows. On the north wall is a carved coat of arms and an inscribed plaque.	II
Field House; 53.07769°N 1.62778°W	—	18th century	The house is in limestone with gritstone dressings, and a tile roof with coped gables and kneelers. There are two storeys and three bays. On the front is a porch, and the windows are two-light casements with mullions.	II
Kennel Meadow Farmhouse and outbuildings 53.06882°N 1.64907°W	—	Mid-18th century	The farmhouse and outbuildings are under a continuous roof, and are in limestone, with gritstone dressings, a moulded eaves band, and a tile roof. There are two storeys, and the house has two bays. The doorway has a massive lintel, and the windows are two-light casements with mullions. In the outbuildings are small-pane casement windows.	II
Kingsford Farmhouse; 53.07767°N 1.62602°W		18th century	The farmhouse is in gritstone, with quoins, and a tile roof with moulded gable copings and kneelers. There are three storeys and three bays, and a lower projection to the west. The original doorway has a massive lintel, it is blocked and a sash window inserted, and a later doorway has been inserted. The other windows are mullioned with casements.	II
Miner's Arms Inn; 53.07689°N 1.62399°W		18th century	The front of the public house is in gritstone with quoins, the rest is in limestone with gritstone dressings, and the roof is tiled. There are three storeys, four bays, and a later single-storey extensions at each end. In the second bay is a porch, over which are transomed windows, and the other windows are mullioned with three lights.	II
Miners cottages 53.07795°N 1.62600°W	—	18th century	A pair of cottages combined into a house, it is in limestone with gritstone dressings, quoins, and a projecting eaves band, the east gable wall is in rendered brick, and the roof is tiled. There are three storeys, two bays, and a single-storey extension on the east. On the front are two doorways, and the windows are sashes.	II
Swiers Farmhouse; 53.07745°N 1.62558°W		18th century	The farmhouse, with possibly an earlier core, is in limestone with gritstone dressings, quoins, and a tile roof with coped gables and kneelers. There are two storeys and attics, three bays, and a later rear extension. On the front is a porch, and the original doorway, which has a massive lintel, is blocked with two casement windows inserted. The other windows are mullioned with two or three lights.	II
Garden House; 53.07753°N 1.62501°W	—	Early 19th century	A limestone house with gritstone dressings, quoins, and a tile roof. There are two storeys and three bays. Above the central doorway is a single-light window, and the other windows are two-light casements.	II
Mining Low Cottage; 53.07773°N 1.62621°W	—	Early 19th century	Two cottages later combined into one, it is in limestone with gritstone dressings, quoins, a projecting eaves band, and a tile roof. There are two storeys, four bays, and a rear outshut. On the front are two doorways, and the windows are small-pane casements.	II
Shiningford Farmhouse; 53.06851°N 1.63669°W	—	Early 19th century	The farmhouse is in gritstone with a projecting eaves band and a tile roof. There are two storeys and four bays. The doorway has a quoined surround and a massive lintel, and the windows are casements.	II
Tudor Cottage; 53.07782°N 1.62601°W	—	Early 19th century	A pair of cottages, later combined into one, it is in rendered limestone with a slate roof. There are two storeys and two bays. The doorway has a large lintel, and the windows are sashes.	II
