= Listed buildings in Hartington Upper Quarter =

Hartington Upper Quarter is a civil parish in the High Peak district of Derbyshire, England. The parish contains six listed buildings that are recorded in the National Heritage List for England. All the listed buildings are designated at Grade II, the lowest of the three grades, which is applied to "buildings of national importance and special interest". The parish is entirely rural, consisting of countryside and moorland, and the listed buildings consist of three farmhouses, two bridges, and a shrine.

== Buildings ==
Name and location	Photograph	Date	Notes
Packhorse bridge 53.20338°N 1.92320°W		Early 18th century	The packhorse bridge crossing the River Dove is in limestone with gritstone dressings. It consists of a single shallow segmental arch, with shallow parapet walls and gritstone copings, linked by iron clamps.
Greatlow Farmhouse; 53.20763°N 1.84011°W		Late 18th century	The farmhouse is in roughcast limestone with gritstone dressings, quoins, and a tile roof. There are two storeys, an L-shaped plan, and two bays. In the centre is a porch and a doorway with a quoined surround and a heavy lintel, and the windows are mullioned with two lights.
Harley Grange; 53.20895°N 1.87806°W		Late 18th century	A limestone farmhouse with gritstone dressings, quoins, and a stone slate roof with coped gables. There are three storeys and three bays. The central doorway has a plain surround, a semicircular fanlight, and a shallow bracketed canopy, and the windows are sashes.
Hillhead Farmhouse; 53.22484°N 1.89034°W	—	Late 18th century	The farmhouse is in limestone with gritstone dressings and a stone slate roof. There are two storeys, a double pile plan, and two bays. The central doorway has a quoined surround, and the windows are mullioned with two lights. At the west end is a recessed two-storey outbuilding with external steps to a loft doorway, and to the east is an open-fronted lean-to.
Three Shire Heads Bridge; 53.21391°N 1.98751°W		Late 18th century (probable)	The bridge crossing the River Dane is in gritstone, and consists of a single deep segmental arch. It has voussoirs, a band, and parapets without coping. The bridge was later widened and provided with a concrete roadway.
Wayside Shrine; 53.28016°N 1.99792°W		Late 19th century	The shrine is in gritstone on a plinth, and has a conical stone slate roof with a lead apex apron and a cross finial. It has a doorway with a timber lintel, and a lancet vent to the right. Inside is a panel of painted tiles in a stone frame.
