= Grade II* listed buildings in South Derbyshire =

There are over 20,000 Grade II* listed buildings in England. This page is a list of these buildings in the district of South Derbyshire in Derbyshire.

== List of buildings ==
| Name | Location | Type | Completed (Note: The date given is the date used by Historic England as significant for the initial building or that of an important part in the structure's description.) | Date designated | Grid ref. (Note: Sometimes known as OSGB36, the grid reference is based on the British national grid reference system used by the Ordnance Survey.) Geo-coordinates | Entry number (Note: The "List Entry Number" is a unique number assigned to each listed building and scheduled monument by Historic England.) | Image |
|---|---|---|---|---|---|---|---|
| Aston Hall | Aston-on-Trent | Country House | Early 18th century | 10 November 1967 | SK4149829170; 52°51′30″N 1°23′06″W | 1096430 | Aston Hall More images |
| Barton Hall | Barton Blount | Country House | 15th century | 2 September 1952 | SK2081934658; 52°54′32″N 1°41′31″W | 1096544 | Upload Photo |
| Bretby Hall | Bretby Park, Bretby | Country House | Early 17th century | 31 October 1985 | SK3001122547; 52°47′59″N 1°33′23″W | 1334588 | Bretby Hall More images |
| Brizlincote Hall Farmhouse | Bretby | Farmhouse | 1707 | 19 January 1967 | SK2727022027; 52°47′42″N 1°35′49″W | 1096480 | Brizlincote Hall Farmhouse More images |
| Deercote west of the Church of St Giles | Calke Park, Calke | Wall | Late 18th century | 6 January 1987 | SK3670922280; 52°47′49″N 1°27′25″W | 1031806 | Deercote west of the Church of St Giles More images |
| Stables and Riding School | Calke Park, Calke | Courtyard | Mid–late 18th century | 19 January 1967 | SK3668322666; 52°48′01″N 1°27′26″W | 1096488 | Stables and Riding School More images |
| Catton Hall | Catton | Country House | 1741 | 2 September 1952 | SK2061315359; 52°44′08″N 1°41′46″W | 1334609 | Catton Hall More images |
| Cauldwell Hall | Cauldwell | Country House | Early 18th century | 2 September 1952 | SK2551417173; 52°45′06″N 1°37′24″W | 1334612 | Upload Photo |
| Church of All Saints | Dalbury Lees | Parish Church | 13th century | 19 January 1967 | SK2635434282; 52°54′19″N 1°36′35″W | 1334550 | Church of All Saints More images |
| Footbridge on former Eggington Estate at SK264277 | Egginton | Footbridge | 1812 | 19 April 1990 | SK2640027700; 52°50′46″N 1°36′34″W | 1140125 | Upload Photo |
| Elvaston Castle | Elvaston | Country House | 1633 | 2 September 1952 | SK4078533004; 52°53′35″N 1°23′43″W | 1334604 | Elvaston Castle More images |
| Gates, gatepiers, and railings to south of the Etwall Almshouses | Etwall | Gate | Early 18th century | 22 August 1985 | SK2688232038; 52°53′06″N 1°36′07″W | 1334552 | Gates, gatepiers, and railings to south of the Etwall Almshouses |
| Sir John Port Almshouses | Etwall | Almshouse | circa 1690 | 2 September 1952 | SK2687832064; 52°53′07″N 1°36′07″W | 1096567 | Sir John Port Almshouses More images |
| Two sets of gatepiers and walls enclosing churchyard of St Saviours Church | Foremark | Gate | Early 18th century | 19 January 1967 | SK3297426488; 52°50′06″N 1°30′43″W | 1334572 | Two sets of gatepiers and walls enclosing churchyard of St Saviours Church |
| The Manor House | Hartshorne | House | 20th century | 2 September 1952 | SK3269020767; 52°47′01″N 1°31′00″W | 1281804 | The Manor House |
| Ingleby Toft | Ingleby | House | Early 18th century | 19 January 1967 | SK3550526504; 52°50′06″N 1°28′28″W | 1370039 | Ingleby Toft |
| Church of All Saints | Lullington | Parish Church | Late 14th century | 19 January 1967 | SK2498712944; 52°42′49″N 1°37′54″W | 1159003 | Church of All Saints More images |
| Grotto to south-east of the Old Mill in Melbourne Hall gardens | Melbourne | Shell Grotto | Early 19th century | 10 November 1967 | SK3910424843; 52°49′11″N 1°25′16″W | 1334617 | Upload Photo |
| Hall Cottages and Stables at Melbourne Hall | Melbourne | House | 16th century | 10 November 1967 | SK3894525025; 52°49′17″N 1°25′25″W | 1096408 | Upload Photo |
| Melbourne Hall | Melbourne | Country House | circa 1630 | 2 September 1952 | SK3897625010; 52°49′16″N 1°25′23″W | 1204079 | Melbourne Hall More images |
| Pair of curved benches to either side of Grand Basin in Melbourne Hall gardens | Melbourne | Garden Seat | Early 18th century | 11 March 1987 | SK3916424944; 52°49′14″N 1°25′13″W | 1096373 | Upload Photo |
| Pair of garden walls flanking top terrace of Melbourne Hall gardens | Melbourne | Garden Wall | circa 1704 | 11 March 1987 | SK3903724949; 52°49′14″N 1°25′20″W | 1096410 | Upload Photo |
| Tithe Barn | Melbourne | Malt Kiln | 17th century | 2 September 1952 | SK3887324981; 52°49′15″N 1°25′29″W | 1204539 | Tithe Barn |
| Water channel and three bridges in Melbourne Hall gardens | Melbourne | Bridge | Early 18th century | 11 March 1987 | SK3912624926; 52°49′14″N 1°25′15″W | 1204519 | Upload Photo |
| Church of St Peter | Netherseal | Parish Church | 13th century | 10 January 1967 | SK2887712890; 52°42′46″N 1°34′26″W | 1334597 | Church of St Peter More images |
| Netherseal Old Hall and attached outbuildings and garden walls | Netherseal | House | 1642 | 2 September 1952 | SK2899712892; 52°42′47″N 1°34′20″W | 1096414 | Netherseal Old Hall and attached outbuildings and garden walls |
| Pigeoncote at Old Hall Cottages | Netherseal | Dovecote | 1689 | 19 January 1967 | SK2898512819; 52°42′44″N 1°34′21″W | 1096418 | Upload Photo |
| Bladon Castle | Newton Solney | Motte | 1801-2 | 19 January 1967 | SK2698925079; 52°49′21″N 1°36′03″W | 1096466 | Bladon Castle |
| Church of St Mary the Virgin | Newton Solney | Parish Church | circa 1300 | 19 January 1967 | SK2792425770; 52°49′43″N 1°35′13″W | 1334576 | Church of St Mary the Virgin More images |
| Overseal House | Overseal | House | Late 18th century | 19 January 1967 | SK2963714953; 52°43′53″N 1°33′45″W | 1311162 | Overseal House |
| The Grange | Repton | House | 1703 | 2 September 1952 | SK3069326437; 52°50′04″N 1°32′45″W | 1096501 | Upload Photo |
| Church of St Mary | Rosliston | Parish Church | 14th century | 19 January 1967 | SK2433716815; 52°44′54″N 1°38′27″W | 1159242 | Church of St Mary More images |
| Shardlow Hall with attached garden seat to north-east corner, steps c.14m from north-west front and steps c.7m west of south-west corner | Shardlow | Country House | 1684 | 11 March 1987 | SK4384830478; 52°52′12″N 1°21′00″W | 1088368 | Shardlow Hall with attached garden seat to north-east corner, steps c.14m from north-west front and steps c.7m west of south-west corner More images |
| The Lock Up (Round House) | Smisby | Lock Up | Late 18th century | 19 January 1967 | SK3486919083; 52°46′06″N 1°29′05″W | 1281737 | The Lock Up (Round House) More images |
| Church of St Michael | Sutton on the Hill | Statue | 20th century | 19 January 1967 | SK2374434239; 52°54′18″N 1°38′54″W | 1096581 | Church of St Michael More images |
| Sutton Hall and attached outbuildings | Sutton on the Hill | House | 1952 | 2 September 1952 | SK2363333815; 52°54′05″N 1°39′00″W | 1334519 | Sutton Hall and attached outbuildings More images |
| Church of St James | Swarkestone | Parish Church | 12th century | 10 November 1967 | SK3719628595; 52°51′13″N 1°26′57″W | 1088344 | Church of St James More images |
| Swarkestone Hall Farmhouse | Swarkestone | Farmhouse | Early 17th century | 2 September 1952 | SK3745528406; 52°51′07″N 1°26′43″W | 1088346 | Swarkestone Hall Farmhouse More images |
| Swarkestone Old Hall and attached walls | Swarkestone | House | 18th century | 10 November 1967 | SK3734328500; 52°51′10″N 1°26′49″W | 1280604 | Swarkestone Old Hall and attached walls More images |
| The Lock-up | Ticknall | Lock Up | Late 18th century | 19 January 1967 | SK3515323908; 52°48′42″N 1°28′48″W | 1096445 | The Lock-up More images |
| The Middle Lodge | Calke Park, Ticknall | Gate Lodge | circa 1805 | 19 January 1967 | SK3573223168; 52°48′18″N 1°28′17″W | 1203338 | The Middle Lodge More images |
| All Saints Church | Trusley | Parish Church | 1713 | 19 January 1967 | SK2535735533; 52°55′00″N 1°37′28″W | 1281370 | All Saints Church More images |
| Old Hall Cottage | Twyford | House | 16th century | 19 January 1967 | SK3291128928; 52°51′25″N 1°30′46″W | 1096517 | Old Hall Cottage |
| Church of St Laurence | Walton-on-Trent | Statue | 20th century | 19 January 1967 | SK2158918230; 52°45′40″N 1°40′53″W | 1159347 | Church of St Laurence More images |
| Walton Hall and attached stable range and garden wall | Walton-on-Trent | Country House | Early 18th century | 2 September 1952 | SK2145917882; 52°45′29″N 1°41′00″W | 1159300 | Walton Hall and attached stable range and garden wall More images |
| Weston Hall | Weston-on-Trent | Country House | Early 17th century | 2 September 1952 | SK4032628350; 52°51′04″N 1°24′09″W | 1088352 | Weston Hall More images |
| Four bottle kilns at Greens Pottery | Church Gresley | Bottle kiln | 18th century | 29 October 1974 | SK3055818744; 52°45′56″N 1°32′55″W | 1280950 | Four bottle kilns at Greens Pottery More images |
| Parish Church of St Mary and Saint George | Church Gresley | Church | 15th century | 14 October 1981 | SK2932718108; 52°45′35″N 1°34′01″W | 1204963 | Parish Church of St Mary and Saint George More images |

== See also ==
- Grade I listed buildings in Derbyshire
- Grade II* listed buildings in Amber Valley
- Grade II* listed buildings in Bolsover (district)
- Grade II* listed buildings in Chesterfield
- Grade II* listed buildings in Derby
- Grade II* listed buildings in Derbyshire Dales
- Grade II* listed buildings in Erewash
- Grade II* listed buildings in High Peak
- Grade II* listed buildings in North East Derbyshire
