= Arthur Eaton =

Architect

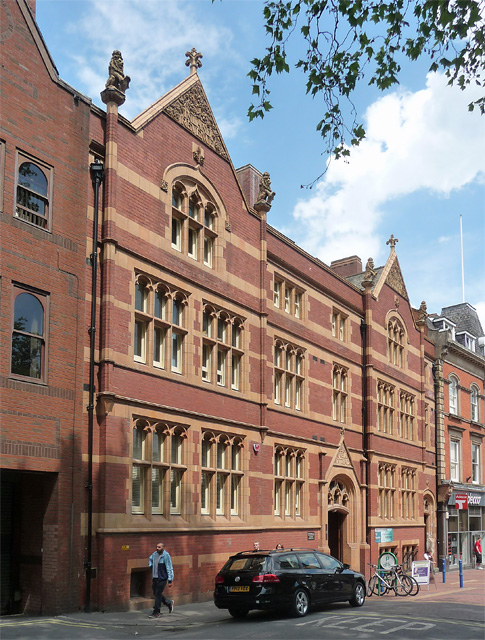
County Court, 18-22 St Peter's Churchyard, Derby 1897

Arthur Eaton (1857 – 29 June 1924) was an architect based in Derby.

== Background ==
He was born in Sutton on the Hill, Derbyshire, the son of Charles Eaton (1819–1893) farmer of Etwall and Jane Morley (1822–1886). He was baptised on 30 December 1857 in St Michael's Church, Sutton-on-the-Hill. He was educated at Repton School. He married Mary Elizabeth Morley (1858–1927) on 11 September 1886. They had three children:

- Kathleen Eaton (1888–1962)
- George Morley Eaton (1889–1940)
- Doris Eaton (1891–1982)

In retirement he lived at The Summit, Burton Road in Derby and he died on 29 June 1924.

== Career ==
He was articled to Giles and Brookhouse in Derby before establishing his own practice at 6 St James’ Street, Derby around 1884. He formed a partnership with his son, Captain George Morley Eaton and operated as Arthur Eaton and Son.

== Works by Arthur Eaton ==
- Board Schools, Shobnall Road, Burton upon Trent 1888
- The Crest, 219 Burton Road, Derby 1896
- County Court, 18-22 St Peter's Churchyard, Derby 1897
- New Dairy, Station Road, Castle Donington, 1897-98
- Deaf and Dumb Institute, Friar Gate, Derby 1900 (extension)
- Repton Isolation Hospital, Sandypits Lane, Etwall 1902-03
- Masonic Hall, Gower Street, Derby 1902 (alterations)
- Electric Power Station, Silk Mill Lane, Derby 1908
- Electric Theatre, Babington Lane, Derby 1910
- Carnegie Public Library, Alvaston, Derby 1914–16
- Nottingham Road Council Schools, Derby
- St Joseph's Schools, Derby
- Kegworth housing scheme

== Works by Arthur Eaton and Son ==
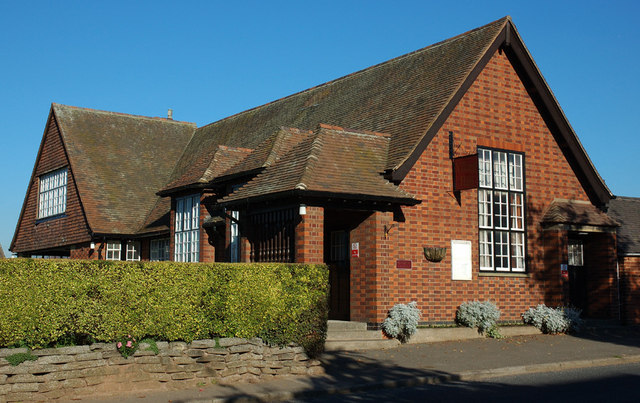
Village Hall, Newton Solney 1932

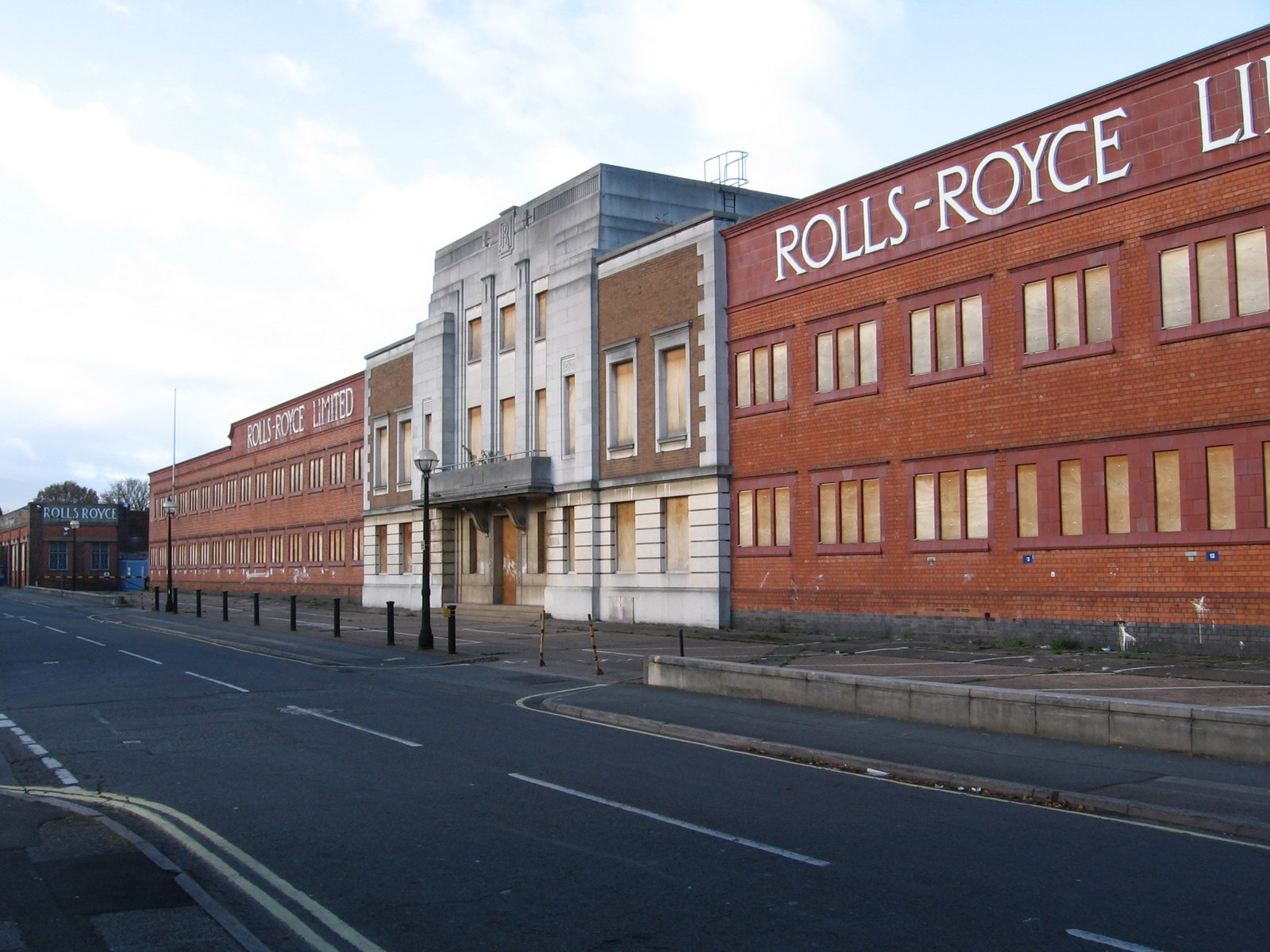
Marble Hall addition to Rolls Royce, Nightingale Road, Derby 1938

These works were completed after the death of Arthur Eaton. The probable architect for them is his son, George Morley Eaton.

- Three maisonette blocks, Penn Avenue, Lenton, Nottingham 1924-26
- Village Hall, Newton Solney 1932
- First Church of Christ Scientist, 3 Friary Street, Derby 1934–38
- Commercial Block at the Rolls-Royce Main Works Site, Marble Hall, Nightingale Road, Derby. 1938 (alterations)
- St Edmund's Church, Sinfin Avenue, Shelton Lock, Derby 1939
- Culland Hall, Brailsford, Derbyshire 1939
