= Church Broughton =

Village in Derbyshire, England

Coordinates: 52.900°N 1.694°W

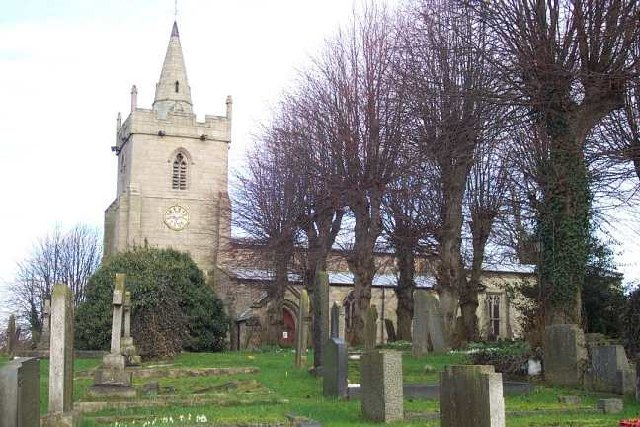

- Church Broughton parish highlighted within Derbyshire
- Population: 615 (Including Harehill. 2011)
- OS grid reference: SK206336
- District: South Derbyshire
- Shire county: Derbyshire
- Region: East Midlands
- Country: England
- Sovereign state: United Kingdom
- Post town: DERBY
- Postcode district: DE65
- Police: Derbyshire
- Fire: Derbyshire
- Ambulance: East Midlands

Church Broughton is a village and civil parish in Derbyshire, 13.7 miles (22.0 km) to the west of Derby. It has a church (Saint Michael and All Angels) and a Methodist chapel (1828). Badway Green is a piece of common land within the parish. It is an isolated village surrounded by farmland.

== History ==
In the early 1870s, Church Broughton was described as:

A parish in the district of Burton-upon-Trent and county of Derby; 2½ miles NNE of Scropton r. station. It includes the hamlets of Sapperton and Harehill; and has a post office, of the name of Church-Broughton, under Derby. The church is ancient, and was recently repaired. There are a Primitive Methodist chapel, an endowed school with £30 a year, and charities £22.

Church Broughton used to be part of the ancient Appletree Hundred, or Wapentake. The nearest place to Church Broughton that is mentioned in the Domesday Book is Barton, only 0.6 kilometres (0.37 mi) from the village and with a total population of "31 households (quite large)", "4 ploughlands (land for), 3 lord's plough teams, 7 men's plough teams" and "64 meadow acres, 2 mills and 1 church." The associated lords of different estates in this area in 1066 were Edric of Tissington, Alfheah of Barton, Dunning, Leodmer of Barton and Leofnoth Sterre.

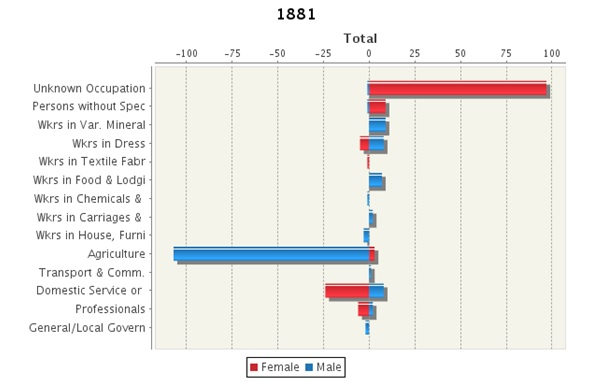
There are two cottages next to the church that date from 1711. The local primary school used to be a barn; it was given by the Duke of Devonshire for school use in 1745. At the time, there were 60 houses in the village. The shop and the far end of Royal Oak Cottage were built around the early 1760s.

=== Enclosure movement in Church Broughton ===
Enclosure occurred in Church Broughton in the 18th and 19th centuries; land that had been formerly owned in common by all members of a village became privately owned. This entailed erecting walls, fences and hedges around new enclosed areas. The English government and aristocracy claimed this would allow for better raising of animals and crops, and that large fields could be farmed more productively than individual plots of the common land.

Church Broughton Inclosure Act 1773
- Act of Parliament
- Parliament of Great Britain
- Long title: An Act for dividing and enclosing the several Open Fields, Arable Lands, Meadows, Commons, and Waste Grounds, within the Manor of Church Broughton, in the County of Derby.
- Citation: 13 Geo. 3. c. 16 Pr.
- Territorial extent: Great Britain

Dates
- Royal assent: 16 March 1773
- Commencement: 26 November 1772 (Note: Start of session.)

Status: Current legislation

Negotiations started in 1758 for Church Broughton to be enclosed in 1775 under the Church Broughton Inclosure Act 1773 (13 Geo. 3. c. 16 Pr.). Farmers within the village bought and sold land from each other. The people who held little or no land but had been allowed to graze their animals on the common land were bought out by wealthier land owners, and then employed for labour.

388 acres were enclosed in 1775; the vicar, supplemented by Queen Anne's Bounty, held 84 acres (34 ha) and the church had 13 acres (5.3 ha).

The former RAF Church Broughton is nearby.

== Population change ==
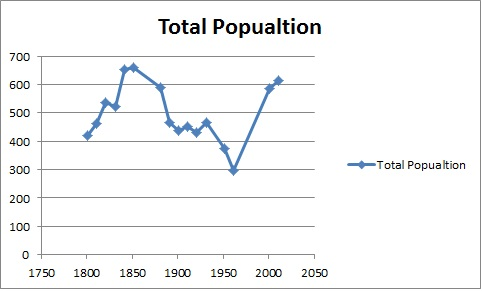
The population of Church Broughton has fluctuated over 264 years, with large increases in population in the 1850s and sudden decreases in the early 1950s. Population has since increased to the present day.

== Present day ==
Broughton Heath has a population of 615 residents according to the 2011 census data.

Broughton Heath Golf Club is situated 1.4 miles (2.3 km) in a southeasterly direction from Church Broughton, set over 42 acres (17 ha). It was first established in 1998 and is one of the longest 18-hole par 3 golf courses in the country.

== Transport ==
There is one local bus that runs from Boylestone, Church Broughton, and Scropton to John Port Spencer Academy in Etwall only in term times. Pupils from Church Broughton Primary School typically move on to John Port School. The nearest railway station to Church Broughton is Tutbury and Hatton, which is 1.57 miles (2.53 km) as the crow flies.

== See also ==
- Listed buildings in Church Broughton
