= Harehills (disambiguation) =

Harehills is an inner-city area of east Leeds, West Yorkshire England.

Harehills may also refer to:

- Hare Hills Tuff, a formation cropping out in Newfoundland, Canada
- Harehill, a village in Derbyshire, England
