= Coke baronets =

Extinct baronetcy in the Baronetage of England

The Coke baronetcy of Longford, in the County of Derby was created in the Baronetage of England on 30 December 1641 for Edward Coke.

He was the grandson of Sir Edward Coke, Lord Chief Justice. His father Clement (died 1629), youngest son of Sir Edward, acquired by marriage the Longford Hall estate in Derbyshire. Coke served as high sheriff of Derbyshire in 1646. His son, the 2nd Baronet, was Member of Parliament for Derbyshire in 1685.

The baronetcy was extinct on the death of the 3rd Baronet in 1727. The Longford estate passed into the ownership of the senior branch of the Coke family of Holkham Hall, Norfolk, represented by the Earl of Leicester.

== Coke of Longford (1641) ==
Escutcheon of the Coke baronets of Longford

- Sir Edward Coke, 1st Baronet (died 1669)
- Sir Robert Coke, 2nd Baronet (1645–1688)
- Sir Edward Coke, 3rd Baronet (1648–1727)

== Family tree ==
Title succession chart, Coke baronets, Barons Lovel (third creation) and Earls of Leicester (fifth and seventh creations).

Sir Edward Coke; 1552–1634
Henry Coke; 1591–1661 | Clement Coke died 1629
Coke baronets
Richard Coke; 1626–1669 | Sir Edward Coke; 1st Baronet died 1669
Robert Coke; 1656–1678 | Sir Robert Coke; 2nd Baronet; 1645–1688 | Sir Edward Coke; 3rd Baronet; 1648–1727
Baronetcy extinct
Edward Coke; 1676–1707
Baron Lovel (3rd creation); Earl of Leicester (5th creation)
Thomas Coke; 1st Earl of Leicester; 1697–1759 | Maj. Philip Roberts died 1779 | Anne Coke
Barony and earldom extinct
Edward Coke; Viscount Coke; 1719–1753 | Wenman Coke (né Roberts) c. 1717 – 1776
Earl of Leicester (7th creation)
Thomas Coke; 1st Earl of Leicester; 1754–1842
Thomas Coke; 2nd Earl of Leicester; 1822–1909
Thomas Coke; 3rd Earl of Leicester; 1848–1941
Thomas Coke; 4th Earl of Leicester; 1880–1949 | Lt. Hon. Arthur Coke; 1882–1915
Thomas Coke; 5th Earl of Leicester; 1908–1976 | Flt Lt. Hon. David Coke; 1915–1941 | Anthony Coke; 6th Earl of Leicester; 1909–1994
Edward Coke; 7th Earl of Leicester; 1936–2015
Thomas Coke; 8th Earl of Leicester born 1965
Edward Coke; Viscount Coke born 2003
