= Osleston and Thurvaston =

Coordinates: 52.9265°N 1.6397°W

- Location within Derbyshire
- Population: 263 (2020)
- Civil parish: Osleston and Thurvaston
- District: South Derbyshire
- Shire county: Derbyshire
- Region: East Midlands
- Country: England
- Sovereign state: United Kingdom
- Post town: Ashbourne
- Postcode district: DE6
- Police: Derbyshire
- Fire: Derbyshire
- Ambulance: East Midlands

Osleston and Thurvaston is a civil parish in Derbyshire, England. The parish includes Longlane, Osleston and Thurvaston. As of 2020, it has a population of 263.

== History ==
Osleston and Thurvaston was formerly a township in the parish of Sutton-on-the-Hill. In 1866, Osleston and Thurvaston became a civil parish in its own right. On 18 August 1882, part of Sutton-on-the-Hill was transferred to Osleston and Thurvaston.

== See also ==
- Listed buildings in Osleston and Thurvaston
