= Thurlaston =

Thurlaston may refer to:

- Thurlaston, Leicestershire
- Thurlaston, Warwickshire

== See also ==
- Thurcaston
- Thurmaston
- Thurvaston
