= Longford Hall, Derbyshire =

Longford Hall
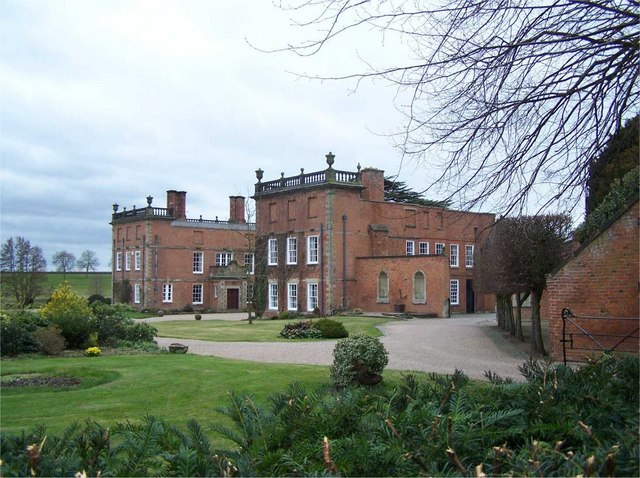
- Longford Hall was restored in 1960, but the upper storey is now a facade.

- Location within Derbyshire

General information
- Location: Longford, Derbyshire, England
- Coordinates: 52.942°N 1.6815°W
- Ordnance Survey: SK2150538249
- Construction started: 16th century
- Client: de Longford family

Design and construction
- Designations: Grade II listed

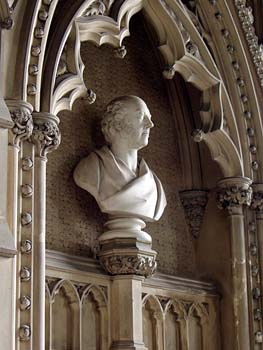
Bust in memory of Thomas Coke at St. Chad's, Longford, Derbyshire

Longford Hall is a 16th-century country house at Longford in the Dales district of Derbyshire, England. It is a Grade II* listed building.

The hall was built in the 16th century for the de Longford family. On the demise of the last of the de Longfords in about 1620 the manor passed to Sarah Reddish, who married Clement Coke, youngest son of Sir Edward Coke, Lord Chief Justice of England and Wales. Their son Edward was created a baronet in 1641 (see Coke baronets) and was High Sheriff of Derbyshire in 1646.

In 1727, with the extinction of the line descended from Clement Coke, the estate passed to the senior line, the Cokes of Holkham Hall in Norfolk, and was inherited by Robert Coke, son of Sir Edward Coke and Cary Newton. When Robert Coke died in 1750, his nephew Wenman Roberts, son of his older sister Anne (who had married Philip Roberts), inherited Longford Hall. Under the will of Sir Edward Coke, third and last Baronet, Roberts assumed the surname and arms of Coke in order to inherit Longford Hall. In 1775, Wenman Coke also inherited Holkham Hall.

The house was much altered in about 1762 by architect Joseph Pickford to a H-plan, two substantial three-storeyed, fifteen-bayed balustraded wings linked by a single-storey central block.

In 1776, at the death of Wenman Coke, his eldest son Thomas William Coke (created Earl of Leicester in 1837) inherited Holkham Hall, and Longford Hall passed to his younger son, Edward Coke. At the death of Edward Coke in 1837, Longford Hall passed to Thomas William Coke, who visited it the same year and found it in a shocking state of disrepair. Coke wrote orders to the bailiff to do all that was necessary to make it habitable. The bailiff, mistakenly believing that the stonework was unsafe, pulled down the tower and the old banqueting hall which contained the carved gallery and stained glass windows bearing the arms of the Longford family from the time of the Conquest. During the last five years of his life, Coke visited Longford annually and returned the estate to its former splendour. In June 1842, Coke, sensing that he was in his last days, decided to pay his boyhood home one last visit. Shortly after his arrival, after dedicating two new bridges he had built over a mill stream that ran through the village, he took seriously ill and died on 30 June 1842 at the age of 88.

A fire destroyed the central cross block and much of the upper storeys. They were restored in 1960, but the upper storey is now only a facade.

== See also ==
- Grade II* listed buildings in Derbyshire Dales
- Listed buildings in Longford, Derbyshire
