= Sir Robert Coke, 2nd Baronet =

English politician

Sir Robert Coke, 2nd Baronet (1645–1688), of Longford, Derbyshire, was an English politician.

== Family ==
Coke was the son of Sir Edward Coke, 1st Baronet. He was one of the Coke family.

== Career ==
He was a member (MP) of the parliament of England for Derbyshire in 1685.

Baronetage of England
Preceded by Edward Coke	Baronet of Longford; 1669–1688	Succeeded by Edward Coke
