= Listed buildings in Barton Blount =

Barton Blount is a civil parish in the South Derbyshire district of Derbyshire, England. The parish contains seven listed buildings that are recorded in the National Heritage List for England. Of these, one is listed at Grade II*, the middle of the three grades, and the others are at Grade II, the lowest grade. The parish contains the small village of Barton Blount and is otherwise rural. The most important building in the parish is Barton Hall, which is listed, together with associated buildings, including a chapel. The other listed buildings are farmhouses and outbuildings.

== Key ==
| Grade | Criteria |
|---|---|
| II* | Particularly important buildings of more than special interest |
| II | Buildings of national importance and special interest |

== Buildings ==
| Name and location | Photograph | Date | Notes | Grade |
|---|---|---|---|---|
| Barton Hall; 52.90899°N 1.69179°W | — | 15th century | A small country house that was remodelled in the 18th century. It is in red brick and sandstone, and has hipped tile roofs, two storeys and attics. The southeast front has a symmetrical block of five bays, the middle bay projecting under a pediment, and a recessed wing of three bays on the left. There are angle pilasters, a string course and a cornice. In the centre is a doorway with a moulded architrave and a bracketed hood. The windows are sashes with moulded architraves, and the window above the doorway has a hood mould. The north east front has nine bays, and contains a porch with a four-centred arch, flanked by polygonal turrets with pseudo-machicolation and an embattled parapet. In the southwest front is a three-storey bay window with mullioned and transomed windows and a balustraded parapet. | II* |
| St Chad's Chapel; 52.90939°N 1.69157°W | — | 1714 | A private chapel that was altered in 1825, it is in sandstone, with corner pilasters, a moulded eaves cornice, and a tile roof with coped gables, obelisk finials, and a west bellcote. On the south front is a round-arched doorway with impost blocks and a keystone, a frieze with triglyphs and paterae, and a pediment with rosettes. The windows are lancets. | II |
| Garden walls, ironwork, summer house and bridge, Barton Hall; 52.90862°N 1.69203°W | — | 18th century | In the grounds of the hall is a sandstone ha-ha continuing as a retaining wall with coping and urns. This is linked by a balustrade to a terrace wall with a double flight of steps and wrought iron railings. Elsewhere, there are wrought iron gates, a brick wall, a bridge, and a summer house with a pyramidal roof and mullioned and transomed windows. | II |
| Barton Park House; 52.91752°N 1.70646°W | — | Mid 18th century | A farmhouse in red brick with a hipped tile roof. There are two storeys, and a T-shaped plan, with a front of three bays, and a three-bay rear wing. On the front is a porch with a hipped roof, flanked by tripartite sash windows with segmental relieving arches. The upper floor contains sash windows with flat heads. In the rear wing is a gabled porch and a door with a fanlight. | II |
| Bartonfields (North) and outbuilding 52.91736°N 1.67785°W | — | Mid 18th century | The farmhouse and outbuildings are in red brick with hipped tile roofs. The main block has three storeys, and fronts of three and two bays. In the main front is a central doorway with a fanlight flanked by canted bay windows, and over all is a parapet with quatrefoils. The upper floors contain sash windows with keystones, and to the right is a range of two storeys and three bays. In the left return is a lower range, and an outbuilding with a segmental-arched carriage entrance and a low tower with a pyramidal roof. | II |
| Gostyfields Farmhouse; 52.91028°N 1.71006°W | — | Late 18th century | The farmhouse is in red brick, and has a tile roof with a coped gable and kneelers at the east end. There are two storeys and three bays. The central doorway has a segmental head, and the windows are casements, those in the ground floor with segmental heads. | II |
| Stable block, Barton Hall; 52.90958°N 1.69153°W | — | Late 19th century | The stable block is in red brick with sandstone dressings and tile roof, and consists of four ranges around a courtyard. The main range is on the west, and has two storeys and five bays, two bays projecting. There is a continuous string course forming a hood mould, and mullioned windows, those in the ground floor also with transoms. The north range contains an embattled clock tower with panelled brickwork, and on the south range is a lean-to canopy. The east range contains a carriage entrance with a Tudor arch. | II |
