= Listed buildings in Longford, Derbyshire =

Longford is a civil parish in the Derbyshire Dales district of Derbyshire, England. The parish contains 22 listed buildings that are recorded in the National Heritage List for England. Of these, one is listed at Grade I, the highest of the three grades, four are at Grade II*, the middle grade, and the others are at Grade II, the lowest grade. The parish contains the village of Longford and the surrounding area. The major building in the parish is Longford Hall, which is listed, together with associated structures, and the adjacent farm and farm buildings. The other listed buildings include a church, a cross and tombs in the churchyard, houses and cottages, farmhouses, a row of almshouses, now in ruins, two bridges, a former watermill, and a former cheese factory.

== Key ==
Grade	Criteria
I	Buildings of exceptional interest, sometimes considered to be internationally important
II*	Particularly important buildings of more than special interest
II	Buildings of national importance and special interest

== Buildings ==
Name and location	Photograph	Date	Notes	Grade
St Chad's Church; 52.94188°N 1.68179°W		12th century	The church has been altered and extended through the centuries, particularly in the 19th century. It is built in sandstone, with a roof of green slate on the nave and grey slate elsewhere. The church consists of a nave with a clerestory, north and south aisles, a chancel, and a west tower. The tower has two stages with moulded string courses, angle buttresses, and a west doorway in a moulded recess, over which is a three-light window. In the upper stage are paired bell openings, centre and corner gargoyles, and an embattled parapet.	I
Churchyard Cross; 52.94171°N 1.68154°W	—	15th century	The cross in the churchyard of St Chad's Church was restored in 1897. It is in sandstone, and has a large square plinth of three steps, a tall square base with chamfered corners, and an octagonal shaft. On this is a 19th-century Latin cross with foliage ends, and on the east side is a figure of a saint on a carved corbel under a cusped ogee arch.	II
Longford Hall and wall 52.94127°N 1.68138°W		Early 16th century	A country house, it was altered in the 18th century, burnt out in 1942, and restored from 1960. The house is in red brick on a plinth, with stone and brick dressings, quoins, floor bands, a moulded eaves cornice, and balustraded parapets with ball finials and urns. The south front has three storeys, the top floor being a façade, and 15 bays, including four large projecting chimney shafts. The east front has two projecting wings, and a recessed linking range. The west front of the south range has a two-storey bay window and a doorway with a moulded surround, and an open scrolled pediment. The windows vary; some are cross windows, some are sashes and others are mullioned. Attached to northeast corner of the house is a high, brick garden wall with flat stone copings and large semicircular-headed niches.	II*
Chapel House Farmhouse; 52.92978°N 1.65990°W		Late 17th century	The farmhouse was extended in the 19th century. The original part is timber framed with painted brick infill on a rendered plinth, the extension is in brick with applied timber framing, and the roof is thatched, with a coped gable to the south. There are two storeys and three bays. On the extension is a thatched gabled porch, and the windows are casements. Inside there are large inglenook fireplaces.	II
Pair of table tombs (southeast); 52.94172°N 1.68179°W	—	1686	The table tombs are in the churchyard of St Chad's Church and are in sandstone. The older tomb has raised and fielded panelled sides, and an inscribed slab. The later tomb is dated 1741, and has rusticated corners and fluted pilasters. On the north side is an inscribed brass plaque.	II
Marsh Farmhouse and outbuilding 52.92965°N 1.66163°W	—	1707	The farmhouse and attached outbuilding are in red brick on a stone plinth with a tile roof. There are two storeys, three bays, and a lower single-bay outbuilding on the right. In the centre is a doorway with a segmental head and a fanlight. Above it is a stair window, and the other windows are casements, most with segmental heads. Above the doorway is an inscribed datestone, and inside there is an inglenook fireplace.	II
Pair of table tombs (south); 52.94169°N 1.68201°W	—	18th century	The table tombs are in the churchyard of St Chad's Church and are in sandstone. The west tomb has a plain base with pilasters and an inscription, and a plain slab with moulded sides. The other tomb has a plain base, with carvings depicting a skeleton, and an angel's head with wings, and the inscription is illegible.	II
Gates and gate piers, Longford Hall; 52.94125°N 1.68009°W		1737	The gate piers flanking the entrance to the drive are in stone, square, about 12 feet (3.7 m) high, and rusticated. Each pier has a moulded cornice, shallow pyramidal coping, and pilasters with scrolled tops. The elaborate iron gates were designed by Robert Bakewell, and are surmounted by elaborate scrolled overmantles with fleur-de-lys-type finials.	II*
Kitchen garden walls, Longford Hall; 52.94420°N 1.68251°W	—	18th century	The walls, which were extended in the 19th century, are in red brick with some vitrified headers, and moulded copings in terracotta and stone. The original walls form a square and are 12 feet (3.7 m) high, with pilaster strips, and the later walls were added to the east and north. The northern wall incorporates a peach house.	II
Barn, Longford Hall Farm; 52.94292°N 1.68147°W	—	1760	The barn, which was extended in the 19th century, is in red brick, with dressings in stone and red brick, and tile roofs. The original part has a sawtooth eaves band, and crowstepped coped gables with moulded kneelers, and the extension has plain coped gables. There is a single storey, and six gabled bays, the outer bays taller. Most of the openings have segmental-arched heads. In the west gable end is an elaborate pattern of diamond vents, and some spelling out initials and the date.	II*
Stable block and coach house, Longford Hall Farm; 52.94248°N 1.68179°W	—	Late 18th century	The stable block and coach house are in red brick with stone dressings on a stone plinth, with a floor band, impost bands, an eaves band, and slate roofs. There is a single storey with lofts, and the three ranges form a U-shaped plan. Each range has five bays, the middle three bays of the west range projecting with an additional storey and a dentilled pediment containing a clock face with a moulded surround. Most of the openings have semicircular heads, and the windows are casements. There are fine interiors, including Tuscan columns.	II*
Longford Grange; 52.93674°N 1.66637°W	—	1820	A rectory which was enlarged in 1840, and later a private house, it is in red brick, and has a hipped slate roof with overhanging eaves. There are two storeys and fronts of four and three bays. In the main west front is a semicircular-headed doorway with a reeded surround, and raised moulded impost blocks. The windows are sashes.	II
Garden House, Longford Hall; 52.94167°N 1.68221°W	—	Early 19th century	The garden house is in red brick with stone dressings, quoins, and a pyramidal slate roof with overhanging eaves. There is a single storey, and sides of two and three bays. In the east front is a basket-headed doorway with moulded imposts, and in the east and south fronts are basket-headed windows with raised impost blocks.	II
The Longford Almshouses; 52.93966°N 1.67802°W	—	Early 19th century	A row of six almshouses on an isolated site, now in ruins. They are in red brick with stone dressings and a sawtooth eaves band. There is a single storey and each house had a single bay. The doorways and windows have moulded surrounds.	II
Bridge over the mill tail of Longford Mill; 52.93410°N 1.67431°W	—	1842	The bridge carries Longford Lane over the mill tail, and is in red brick with stone dressings. It consists of a stilted semicircular arch flanked by smaller similar arches. The arches have voussoirs, a keystone on piers, a stone band, and brick parapets with stone copings. At the ends are brick piers with large coping stones.	II
Bridge southwest of Longford Mill; 52.93432°N 1.67499°W	—	1842	The bridge carries Longford Lane over Longford Brook, and is in red brick with stone dressings. The bridge consists of a wide basket arch flanked by stilted semicircular arches. The arches have voussoirs, a stone band, and brick parapets with stone copings. The walls curve upwards towards the centre and end in a brick pier with a large coping stone. On the bridge are two inscribed plaques.	II
Cowsheds, Longford Hall Farm; 52.94275°N 1.68192°W	—	Mid 19th century	The cowsheds are in red brick, and have tile roofs with coped crowstepped gables on moulded kneelers. There is a single storey, a double depth plan, and five bays. The north front contains a segmental-headed doorway with a stable door, on the west front is a serpent-headed doorway, and in the south front is a semicircular-headed doorway. Elsewhere, there are casement windows and various vents.	II
Icehouse, Longford Hall; 52.94205°N 1.67473°W	—	Mid 19th century	The icehouse in an isolated position to the northeast of the hall is in red brick. It consists of an underground domed well, with a barrel vaulted entrance tunnel to the north.	II
Longford Mill and weir 52.93441°N 1.67423°W		1857	The water mill, which was converted into a house in 1972, is in red brick, with dressings in stone and brick, and a tile roof with overhanging eaves. There are two storeys and attics and three bays, and a two-storey single-bay wing to the west. In the centre is an arched stable door, and the outer bays contain blind four-centred arched niches with a basket-arched casement window in each floor. Above the doorway is a window, an initialled datestone, a hoist platform with iron railings, and a gabled dormer with a pendant. In front of the house is a retaining wall with two segmental arches to carry water, and against the east gable wall is the replaced iron waterwheel. At the rear of the house is a sluice, and a mill pond leading to a stone weir.	II
Gardener's Cottage, Longford Hall Farm; 52.94354°N 1.68367°W	—	1861	The cottage is in red brick with stone dressings, and a tile roof with pierced bargeboards. There is a single storey and attics, and three bays. The middle bay is gabled and contains a cross window. Elsewhere, there are casement windows, and in the east bay is an open porch. The east gable wall contains a datestone.	II
Longford Cheese Factory; 52.93408°N 1.67463°W		1870	Reputed to be the first cheese factory in England, and later used for other purposes, it is timber framed with weatherboarding, additions in red brick, and a slate roof with overhanging eaves. There is a single storey and four bays. On the north side is a raised brick platform with steel girders supporting a weatherboarded canopy.	II
Former gasworks, Longford Hall Farm; 52.94365°N 1.68129°W	—	Late 19th century	The gasworks, later used for other purposes, is in red brick, with dressings in Staffordshire blue brick, and a slate roof with terracotta coped crowstepped gables. There are three bays, the central bay gabled, with dentilled eaves, a segmental-headed arch and a blocked circular window above. The flanking wings have pitched roofs, sawtooth eaves, and segmental-headed windows.	II
