= All Saints' Church, Dalbury =

All Saints’ Church, Dalbury
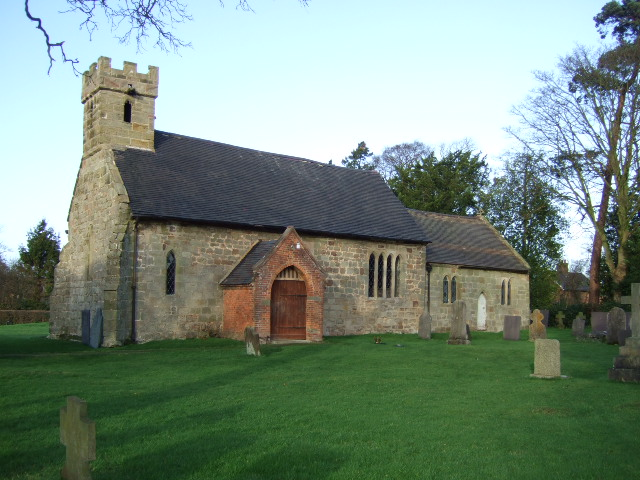
- All Saints’ Church, Dalbury
- All Saints’ Church, Dalbury
- 52°54′19.77″N 1°36′33.22″W
- Location: Dalbury Lees
- Country: England
- Denomination: Church of England

History
- Dedication: All Saints

Architecture
- Heritage designation: Grade II* listed

Administration
- Province: Province of York
- Diocese: Diocese of Derby
- Archdeaconry: Derby
- Deanery: Longford
- Parish: Dalbury

All Saints’ Church, Dalbury is a Grade II* listed parish church in the Church of England in Dalbury Lees, Derbyshire.

== History ==
The church dates from the 13th century. It was restored in 1844 with a contribution from the Queen Dowager, Adelaide of Saxe-Meiningen of £20 and reopened on 23 December 1844.

The church has the distinction of possessing what is likely the oldest complete stained glass window in an English parish church. The Romanesque figure of an Archangel is believed to date from the early 12th century and clearly originally designed for a small Norman window opening (likely lost during later alterations) and is now reset in plain glazing in one of the south windows of the nave.

== Organ ==
The organ dates from around 1820 and is by Benjamin Flight and Joseph Robson. A specification of the organ can be found on the National Pipe Organ Register.

== Parish status ==
The church is in a joint parish with

- St John the Baptist's Church, Boylestone
- St Michael and All Angels' Church, Church Broughton
- St Chad's Church, Longford
- Christ Church, Long Lane
- St Andrew's Church, Radbourne
- St Michael's Church, Sutton-on-the-Hill
- All Saints’ Church, Trusley

== See also ==
- Grade II* listed buildings in South Derbyshire
- Listed buildings in Dalbury Lees
