= Listed buildings in Newton Solney =

Newton Solney is a civil parish in the South Derbyshire district of Derbyshire, England. The parish contains 19 listed buildings that are recorded in the National Heritage List for England. Of these, two are listed at Grade II*, the middle of the three grades, and the others are at Grade II, the lowest grade. The parish contains the village of Newton Solney and the surrounding area. Most of the listed buildings are houses, cottages and associated structures, farmhouses and farm buildings. The other listed buildings include a church, follies, a hotel and a public house, a row of almshouses, and part of a model farm.

== Key ==
Grade	Criteria
II*	Particularly important buildings of more than special interest
II	Buildings of national importance and special interest

== Buildings ==
Name and location	Photograph	Date	Notes	Grade
St Mary the Virgin's Church; 52.82878°N 1.58710°W		14th century	The church has been altered and extended through the centuries, and was heavily restored in 1880–82. It is built in sandstone, and has Welsh slate roofs with decorative ridge tiles. The church consists of a nave with a clerestory, north and south aisles, a south porch, a chancel and a north vestry, and a west steeple. The steeple has a tower with two stages, a two-light west window with Y-tracery, slit bell openings, an embattled parapet, and a recessed octagonal spire with two tiers of lucarnes, those in the top tier very small. There are re-set Norman fragments in the north wall, and embattled parapets along the nave.	II*
The Cottage; 52.82722°N 1.58683°W		18th century	A house that was remodelled in cottage orné style in about 1840. It is in painted and rendered brick, with hipped and gabled Welsh slate roofs. There are two storeys and a west front of six bays, the left three bays recessed. In the right part is a Gothic doorway flanked by canted oriel windows. Above is a Gothic doorway flanked by windows with Y-tracery, all set in dormers under flat topped parapets with ramped sides. In front is a balcony and a verandah with a decorative balustrade. The left part has segmental-headed windows in the ground floor and windows with pointed heads and Y-tracery above.	II
Barn, Trent Farm; 52.82750°N 1.58335°W		Late 18th century	The barn is in red brick, and has a tile roof with coped gables and plain kneelers. On the south front is a segmental-headed doorway and a square opening. The north front has external steps leading up to a doorway with a segmental head, and on both fronts are vents, some blocked.	II
The Croft; 52.82750°N 1.58335°W		Late 18th century	A red brick house with dentilled floor and eaves bands and cornice and a tile roof. There are three storeys and three bays. The doorway has a segmental head and a gabled porch, it is flanked by bow windows, and above are casement windows. The windows in the lower two floors have segmental heads.	II
The Poplars; 52.82914°N 1.57783°W	—	Late 18th century	A farmhouse in red brick with a dentilled eaves cornice, and a tile roof with coped gables and plain kneelers. There are two storeys and an attic, and an L-shaped plan, with a front of three bays. In the centre is a stone porch moved from another house, with arched panels on the sides, a moulded cornice, and acroteria, and above it is a blind segmental arch. The outer bays contain casement windows with brick wedge lintels.	II
Bladon Castle; 52.82252°N 1.60092°W		1795	Initially a folly designed by Jeffry Wyatville, it was partly converted into a house in 1801–02, and is now partly in ruins. The building is in brick with an embattled parapet, and has an irregular plan with a west front of eleven bays. On the front is a full height canted bay window flanked by lancet windows, and elsewhere are Gothic windows. At the ends are taller square towers. The north front has five bays, and in the centre is a gate tower with polygonal turrets and a central pointed carriage arch. To the northwest is an enclosure with a circular turret.	II*
Newton Park Hotel; 52.82630°N 1.58728°W		1798	A small country house, it was remodelled in the 19th century, and later converted into a hotel. It is in rendered brick and stone, and has hipped Welsh slate roofs. There are two ranges, the earlier range with three storeys and five bays, quoins, a floor band, and a metope frieze. In the centre is a porch with Composite columns, and a balustraded parapet, and the windows are sashes with moulded surrounds. At the rear is a full-length conservatory. The later range to the left has two storeys and eight bays. On the front is a mullioned and transomed bay window, to its left is a canted bay window with a parapet and ball finials, behind which is a full height bay window with an attic storey and a pyramidal roof.	II
Beehive Cottage; 52.82736°N 1.58589°W		Early 19th century	The cottage is in rendered brick with a tile roof. There is a single storey and an octagonal plan. On five sides is a cross casement window, and the other side contains a doorway, all with ogee arches.	II
Bladon Castle Lodge; 52.82626°N 1.59799°W	—	Early 19th century	The lodge is in red brick and in Gothic style, with a tile roof, decorative bargeboards and a tall embattled chimney. There is a single storey and three bays. On the gabled entrance front is a timber gabled porch and a doorway with a pointed head. The windows are lancets with pointed heads and diamond glazing and hood moulds.	II
Bladon Garden Cottages and stable block 52.82083°N 1.60452°W	—	Early 19th century	A pair of cottages and a stable block in red brick with tile roofs. They consist of three two-storey blocks joined by single-storey links, with the stable block to the south. The cottages have doorways with fanlights and pediments, and sash windows with wedge lintels. The stable block has a segmental-headed doorway, horizontally-sliding sash windows, an upper floor doorway under a gabled hood with a hoist wheel, and an iron balcony.	II
Brickmakers Arms; 52.82735°N 1.58408°W		Early 19th century	The public house is in painted brick with a dentilled eaves cornice, and a tile roof. There are two storeys and four bays. On the front is a doorway approached by steps, and casement windows, those in the ground floor with segmental heads.	II
Newton Park Farmhouse; 52.82064°N 1.58458°W	—	Early 19th century	The farmhouse is in rendered brick on a plinth, with a floor band, an eaves band, and a Welsh slate roof. There are two storeys and four bays, the left bay lower. The doorway has a semicircular fanlight, and the windows are a mix of sashes and casements. All the openings have wedge lintels.	II
The Cedars; 52.82674°N 1.58571°W		Early 19th century	A house in rendered brick on a plinth, with angle pilaster strips, a fluted and a plain eaves band, overhanging eaves, and a hipped Welsh slate roof. There are two storeys and a front of three bays, with a recessed bay on the left. Steps lead up to a Tuscan Doric porch and a doorway with a rectangular fanlight. The windows are sashes, most of them tripartite with hood moulds.	II
The Lodge and walls 52.82680°N 1.58637°W		Early 19th century	The lodge is in rendered brick with a floor band, an eaves band, and hipped Welsh slate roofs. There are two storeys and three bays, the middle bay projecting and taller. The doorway is in the left bay, and the windows are casements. The front garden is enclosed by curving wing walls that have ramped coped parapets. To the left is a round-arched doorway, and to the right is an alcove.	II
Folly, Newton Park; 52.82429°N 1.59022°W	—	19th century	The folly in Newton Park has been constructed from re-used medieval sandstone masonry from Burton Abbey. It forms a rectangular plan, and includes a wall, a square tower-like structure with pointed arches on three sides, a diagonal buttress, and a piece of walling with a corbelled-out half-arch.	II
Medieval arch, Newton Park; 52.82484°N 1.58943°W	—	19th century	The arch is a folly reconstructed from an arch in a medieval bridge at Burton-on-Trent, and incorporates other carved medieval stones. It is in sandstone, and consists of a steeply pointed arch with a chamfered surround and a stepped parapet. The carved sones are set in the spandrels, and include a head and an ogee niche.	II
Gardener's House, Newton Park; 52.82453°N 1.58915°W	—	c. 1860	The house is in red brick with stone dressings, rendered at the rear, on a chamfered plinth, with a hipped tile roof. There is a single storey and a plan of two square ranges at an angle. The doorway has a pointed arch, a chamfered surround, and pierced spandrels. The windows are mullioned, and the rear range has an embattled parapet with a ball finial at the angle.	II
Almshouses, walls and railings 52.82745°N 1.58443°W		1876	A row of four almshouses in red brick, with dressings in blue brick and stone, and a tile roof with decorative bargeboards. There is a single storey, and each house has a doorway flanked by windows, all with segmental pointed heads and polychromatic arches. The windows are cross windows, the doorways have fanlights, and in the centre is an inscribed and dated stone plaque. The front garden is enclosed by a low brick wall with iron railings, and four brick piers with stone pyramidal caps.	II
Farm buildings and cottage, Park Farm; 52.82116°N 1.58452°W	—	1890	Part of a model farm, the buildings are in red brick with Welsh slate roofs. They form an E-shaped plan, with other buildings filling parts of the gaps. The north range has two storeys, and a central dovecote with a pyramidal roof and a lantern and weathervane, the west range has a single storey, and the east range has two storeys. Most of the openings have segmental heads. To the south is a cottage with two storeys and casement windows.	II
