= Listed buildings in Boylestone =

Boylestone is a civil parish in the Derbyshire Dales district of Derbyshire, England. The parish contains six listed buildings that are recorded in the National Heritage List for England. Of these, one is listed at Grade II*, the middle of the three grades, and the others are at Grade II, the lowest grade. The parish contains the village of Boylestone and the hamlet of Harehill, and the surrounding countryside. The listed buildings consist of two houses, a church, a public house, a farmhouse, and a vicarage converted into a private house and an associated water pump.

== Key ==
| Grade | Criteria |
|---|---|
| II* | Particularly important buildings of more than special interest |
| II | Buildings of national importance and special interest |

== Buildings ==
| Name and location | Photograph | Date | Notes | Grade |
|---|---|---|---|---|
| St John the Baptist's Church; 52.91955°N 1.73134°W | | Early 14th century | The church has been altered and extended through the centuries, and the tower was added during a restoration by Henry Duesbury in 1843–44. The church is built in sandstone with slate roofs, and consists of a nave, a south aisle, a lower chancel, and a tower in the angle between the nave and the aisle. The tower has three stages, a west doorway with a chamfered surround, a four-centred arched head, and a hood mould, and to the south is a stair turret. In the middle stage are lancet windows and a clock face on the south side, the top stage contains bell openings and pilasters, above which is a moulded cornice, and a pyramidal spire with concave sides and lucarnes. | II* |
| Mount Pleasant; 52.91982°N 1.72766°W | — | 17th century | A timber framed house with wattle and daub and brick nogging, refronted in the 18th century with red brick; the timber framing is exposed in the east gable wall. The house has a tile roof, two storeys, two bays, a single-storey bay to the west, and a rear outshut. The windows are casements; those in the ground floor and the central doorway have segmental heads. | II |
| Rose and Crown Public House; 52.91757°N 1.73827°W | | Early 18th century | The public house, which was extended to the west in the 19th century, is in painted brick, with a sawtooth eaves band, and a tile roof. There are two storeys, and each part has two bays, the later part higher. The windows are casements; those in the ground floor and the doorways have segmental heads. Inside the original part is an inglenook fireplace. | II |
| Badgers Green and water pump 52.91961°N 1.73043°W | — | Mid 18th century | A vicarage, later a private house, in brick with stone dressings, a floor band, a moulded cornice, overhanging eaves, and a slate roof. There are two storeys and attics, and an L-shaped plan, with a front range of three bays, and later extensions. On the front is a central gabled porch and a doorway flanked by canted bay windows. The windows are sashes, and the doorway and windows have wedge lintels and double keystones. At the rear is an elaborate cast iron water pump. | II |
| Harehill Farmhouse; 52.91575°N 1.73947°W | — | Mid 18th century | A farmhouse and cottage combined into a house, it is in red brick with a sawtooth eaves band, and a tile roof with moulded gable copings. There are two storeys and attics, and an L-shaped plan with a front range of three bays. There are two doorways, one with a porch hood, and the windows are casements. The doorways and windows have segmental heads, and the attic windows and those in the rear wing have keystones. | II |
| Little Hassett; 52.91987°N 1.73180°W | — | Early 19th century | A pair of cottages combined into one house in painted brick with a tile roof. There is one storey and attics, and two bays. On the front is a circular window that has a semicircular hood mould with the stops carved as angel heads. The other windows are casements, there are two doorways, and the windows and doorways have segmental heads. | II |
