= Listed buildings in Church Broughton =

Church Broughton is a civil parish in the South Derbyshire district of Derbyshire, England. The parish contains ten listed buildings that are recorded in the National Heritage List for England. Of these, one is listed at Grade I, the highest of the three grades, and the others are at Grade II, the lowest grade. The parish contains the village of Church Broughton, and is otherwise rural. The listed buildings consist of a church, houses, cottages and associated structures, farmhouses, and farm buildings

== Key ==
Grade	Criteria
I	Buildings of exceptional interest, sometimes considered to be internationally important
II	Buildings of national importance and special interest

== Buildings ==
Name and location	Photograph	Date	Notes	Grade
St Michael and All Angels' Church; 52.90097°N 1.69624°W		14th century	The church, which has retained some Norman features, has been altered and extended through the centuries. It is built in sandstone with lead roofs, and consists of a nave with a clerestory, north and south aisles, a south porch, a chancel, and a west tower. The tower has angle buttresses, a northeast stair turret, a clock face on the south side, gargoyles, and an embattled parapet with circular corner pinnacles. It is surmounted by a small inset spire with lucarnes.	I
Old Hall; 52.89898°N 1.69583°W	—	16th century	A timber framed house encased in brick in the early 18th century, and partly rendered, with a tile roof. There are two storeys and attics, and a T-shaped plan, consisting of a hall and a cross-wing, and in the north angle is a two-storey porch. The windows are casements, some with segmental heads and others with flat heads. Inside there is exposed timber framing and an inglenook fireplace.	II
Sapperton Manor; 52.90748°N 1.72459°W	—	17th century	The house has a timber framed core, it was encased in brick in the 18th century, and later partly rendered. The roof is tiled, and there are two storeys. The house has an H-shaped plan, with a central hall range of two bays, gabled cross-wings, and an additional bay on the right. The doorway has a bracketed hood, and the windows are casements, those in the hall range in half-dormers. Inside the house is exposed timber framing and an inglenook fireplace.	II
Lees Hall; 52.91039°N 1.73573°W	—	17th century	A farmhouse in red brick with stone dressings, a sawtooth eaves cornice, and a tile roof with coped gables and plain kneelers. There are two storeys, a T-shaped plan, and a symmetrical front of three bays. In the centre is a doorway with a moulded surround, a fanlight and a keystone. The windows are cross windows with segmental arches and keystones.	II
Muse Lane Farmhouse and wall 52.89714°N 1.73752°W	—	Mid 18th century	The farmhouse is in red brick with stone dressings, a floor band, a sawtooth eaves cornice, and a tile roof with coped gables and plain and moulded kneelers. There are two storeys and attics, a symmetrical front of three bays, and a lower two-storey bay on the right. In the centre is a doorway with a cambered head, a fanlight, and a keystone. The windows are casements with cambered heads and keystones, and in the roof are three dormers with hipped roofs. The front garden is enclosed by a brick wall with rounded stone copings.	II
Mount Pleasant; 52.89838°N 1.67164°W	—	c. 1787	The farmhouse is in red brick, with a dentilled eaves cornice, a tile roof, and two storeys. The north front has three bays, a central doorway with a moulded surround and a hood mould, above which is a semicircular-headed stair window. In the outer bays are sash windows, those in the ground floor with segmental heads. The centre of the south front contains a doorway with a segmental arch and a fanlight, and to its left is a canted bay window.	II
Cromwell House Farmhouse; 52.89865°N 1.69903°W	—	Early 19th century	The farmhouse is in red brick with a dentilled eaves cornice and a tile roof. There are three storeys and a symmetrical front of three bays. In the centre is a porch and a doorway with a fanlight. The windows are casements with segmental heads.	II
Cart shed, Sapperton Manor; 52.90749°N 1.72351°W	—	Early 19th century	The cart shed is in red brick, and has a tile roof with coped gables and moulded kneelers. It is open to the west, with four bays, and three brick piers with wooden lintels.	II
Farm buildings, Sapperton Manor; 52.90775°N 1.72408°W		Early 19th century	The farm buildings include a thrashing barn, cowsheds, stables and walls arranged around a yard. They are in red brick with some stone dressings, they have tile roofs with coped gables, and are in one and two storeys. In the centre of the north range is a tower with a round-arched doorway, over which is a round-arched window, a clock face, a dovecote, and a pyramidal roof with a weathervane. The yard is closed on the south by a wall with stone copings and gate piers.	II
Church Cottages; 52.90084°N 1.69676°W	—	Early 19th century	A terrace of three red brick cottages with stone dressings and a Welsh slate roof. There are two storeys and a symmetrical front of four bays. In the centre is a flat-roofed porch, flanked by three-light mullioned windows. The upper floor contains two two-light mullioned windows in gabled half-dormers with wavy bargeboards.	II
