= Osleston =

Hamlet in Derbyshire, England

Coordinates: 52.931°N 1.632°W

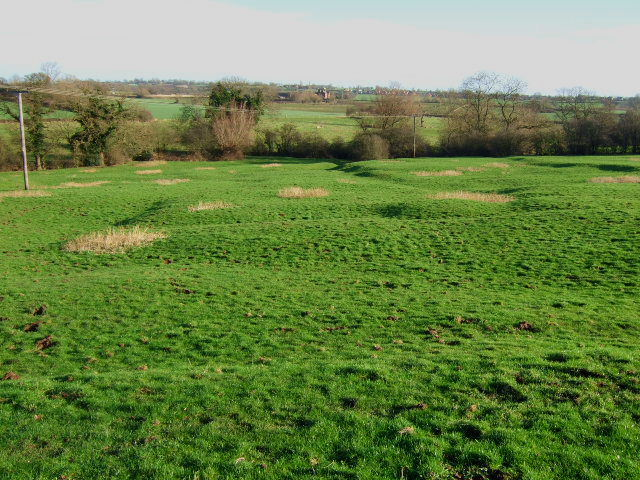
- The remains of the medieval village of Osleton

- Location within Derbyshire
- Population: 267 (2011)
- OS grid reference: SK248371
- Civil parish: Osleston and Thurvaston
- District: South Derbyshire
- Shire county: Derbyshire
- Region: East Midlands
- Country: England
- Sovereign state: United Kingdom
- Post town: ASHBOURNE
- Postcode district: DE6
- Police: Derbyshire
- Fire: Derbyshire
- Ambulance: East Midlands

Osleston is a hamlet which together with Thurvaston makes up the parish of Osleston and Thurvaston. The civil parish population at the 2011 Census was 267 people. It is 7.5 miles (12.1 km) north west of Derby.

In 1848, Osleston, (with Thurvaston), was a place, in the parish of Sutton-on-the-Hill It was recorded as having 1,588 acres (6.43 km^{2}), of which 842 are in Orleston hamlet, and 746 in that of Thurvaston; in each is a small rural village, and the township also includes the scattered village of Cropper, where the Primitive Methodists have a place of worship.

== See also ==
- Listed buildings in Osleston and Thurvaston
