= St Michael and All Angels' Church, Church Broughton =

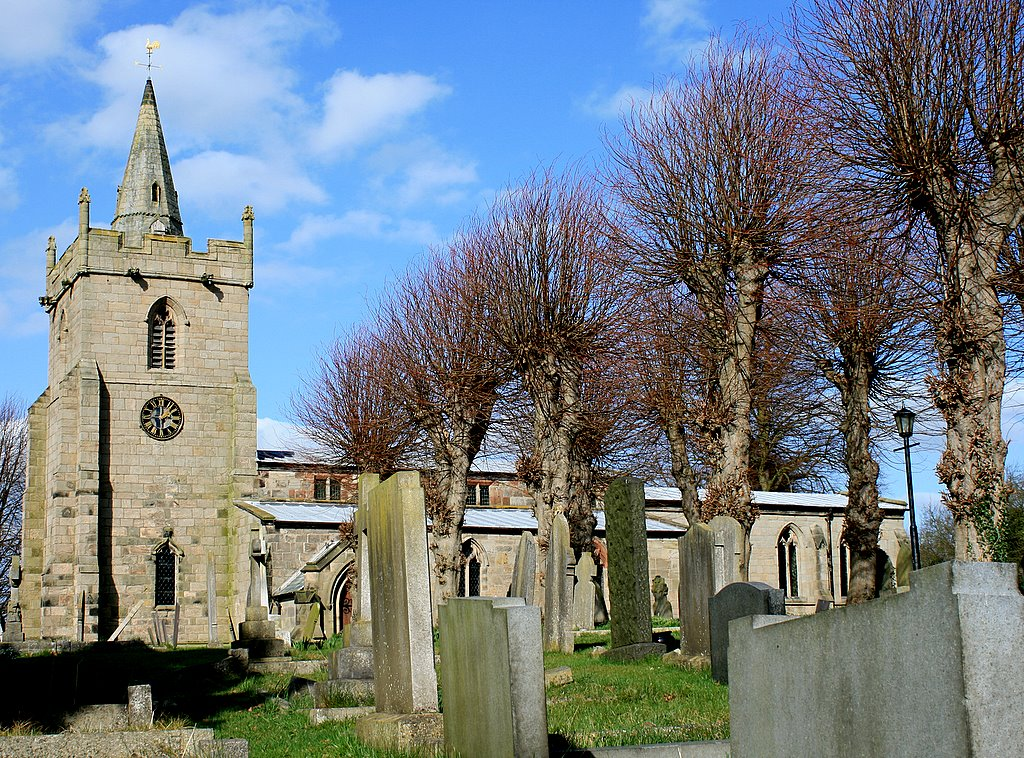
- St Michael and All Angels' Church, Church Broughton
- St Michael and All Angels' Church, Church Broughton
- 52°53′54.8″N 1°41′48.12″W
- Location: Church Broughton
- Country: England
- Denomination: Church of England

History
- Dedication: St Michael and All Angels

Architecture
- Heritage designation: Grade I listed

Administration
- Province: Province of York
- Diocese: Diocese of Derby
- Archdeaconry: Derby
- Deanery: Longford
- Parish: Church Broughton

St Michael and All Angels’ Church, Church Broughton is the Church of England parish church of Church Broughton, Derbyshire. It is a Grade I listed building.

== History ==
The church dates from the early 12th century but contains elements from the 14th, 15th and early 18th centuries.

It was restored in 1886 by J. R. Naylor of Derby and re-opened by the Bishop of Southwell on 22 June 1886.

== Organ ==
The two-manual, 17-stop pipe organ was installed by Nicholson and Lord. A specification of the organ can be found on the National Pipe Organ Register.

== Parish status ==
The church is in a joint parish with

- St John the Baptist's Church, Boylestone
- All Saints' Church, Dalbury
- St Chad's Church, Longford
- Christ Church, Long Lane
- St Andrew's Church, Radbourne
- St Michael's Church, Sutton-on-the-Hill
- All Saints’ Church, Trusley

== See also ==
- Grade I listed buildings in Derbyshire
- Grade I listed churches in Derbyshire
- Listed buildings in Church Broughton
