= St John the Baptist's Church, Boylestone =

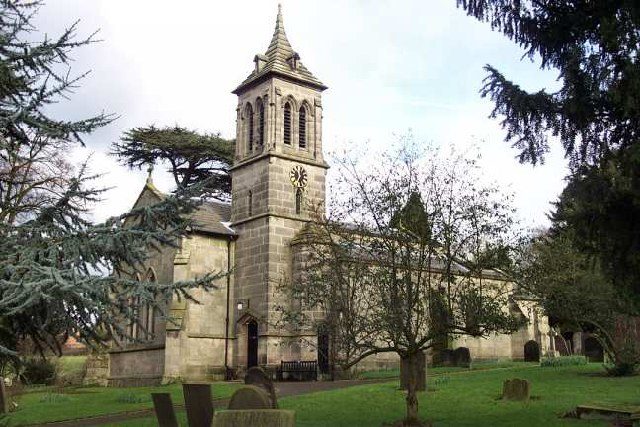
- St John the Baptist's Church, Boylestone
- St John the Baptist's Church, Boylestone
- 52°54′59.78″N 1°43′34.74″W
- Location: Boylestone
- Country: England
- Denomination: Church of England

History
- Dedication: St John the Baptist

Architecture
- Heritage designation: Grade II* listed

Administration
- Province: Province of York
- Diocese: Diocese of Derby
- Archdeaconry: Derby
- Deanery: Longford
- Parish: Boylestone

St John the Baptist's Church, Boylestone is a Grade II* listed parish church in the Church of England in Boylestone, Derbyshire.

== History ==
The church dates from the early 14th century. It was restored by Henry Duesbury when a new tower was added and reopened on Whit Tuesday 1844.

== Parish status ==
The church is in a joint parish with

- St Michael and All Angel's Church, Church Broughton
- All Saints' Church, Dalbury
- St Chad's Church, Longford
- Christ Church, Long Lane
- St Andrew's Church, Radbourne
- St Michael's Church, Sutton-on-the-Hill
- All Saints’ Church, Trusley

== See also ==
- Grade II* listed buildings in Derbyshire Dales
- Listed buildings in Boylestone
