= St Chad's Church, Longford =

St Chad’s Church, Longford
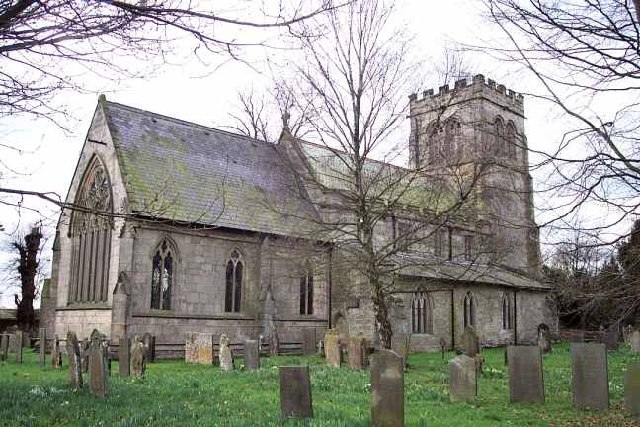
- St Chad’s Church, Longford
- St Chad’s Church, Longford
- 52°56′36.47″N 1°40′53.42″W
- Location: Longford, Derbyshire
- Country: England
- Denomination: Church of England

History
- Dedication: St Chad

Architecture
- Heritage designation: Grade I listed

Administration
- Province: Province of York
- Diocese: Diocese of Derby
- Archdeaconry: Derby
- Deanery: Longford
- Parish: Longford

St Chad's Church, Longford is a Grade I listed parish church in the Church of England in Longford, Derbyshire.

== History ==
The church dates from the 12th century, with other work from the 14th, 15th and 16th centuries. The tower is 15th century with almost full height buttresses to each corner.

The living of St Chad's was originally in the gift of the Earl of Leicester. This transferred to Arthur Manners when he acquired Longford Hall.

== Organ ==
The two manual, 17 stop pipe organ was installed by I Abbott in 1874. A specification of the organ can be found on the National Pipe Organ Register.

== Parish status ==
The church is in a joint parish with

- St John the Baptist's Church, Boylestone
- St Michael and All Angels' Church, Church Broughton
- All Saints' Church, Dalbury
- Christ Church, Long Lane
- St Andrew's Church, Radbourne
- St Michael's Church, Sutton-on-the-Hill
- All Saints’ Church, Trusley

== See also ==
- Grade I listed churches in Derbyshire
- Grade I listed buildings in Derbyshire
- Listed buildings in Longford, Derbyshire
