= Christ Church, Long Lane =

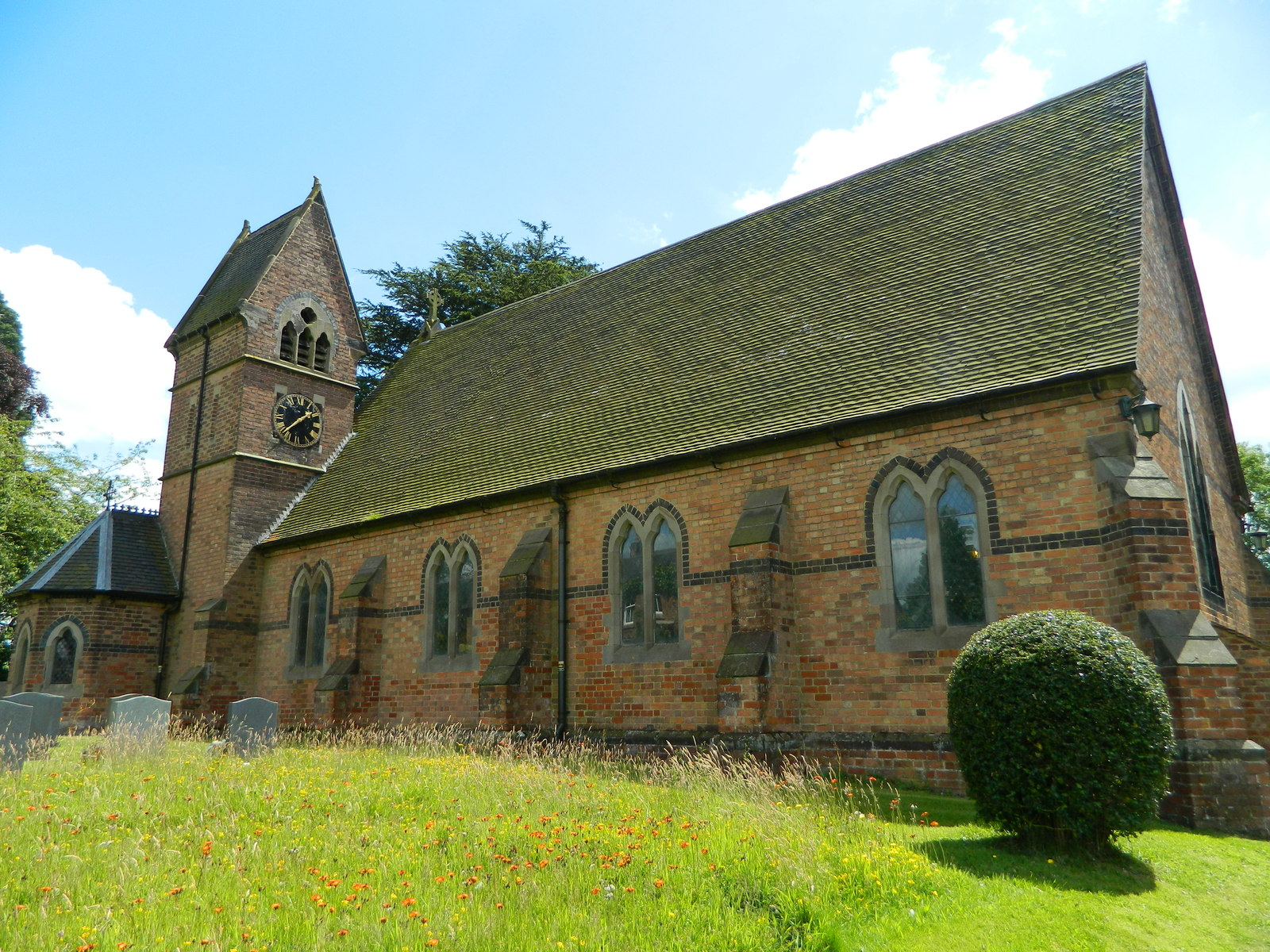
- Christ Church, Long Lane
- 52°56′20.7″N 1°37′35.3″W
- Location: Long Lane, Derbyshire
- Country: England
- Denomination: Church of England

History
- Dedication: Christ Church

Architecture
- Heritage designation: Grade II listed
- Architect: Robert Evans
- Completed: 1859

Administration
- Province: Province of York
- Diocese: Diocese of Derby
- Archdeaconry: Derby
- Deanery: Longford
- Parish: Long Lane

Christ Church, Long Lane is a Grade II listed parish church in the Church of England in Long Lane, Derbyshire.

== History ==
The church dates from 1859. It was built by the contractor William Evans of Ellastone to the designs of the architect Robert Evans of Hine and Evans in Nottingham for a cost of £900. It was consecrated on 8 October 1859 by the Bishop of Lichfield. The east window was by William Wales of Newcastle.

The tower and vestry were added in 1874.

== Organ ==
The organ is by I Abbott. A specification of the organ can be found on the National Pipe Organ Register.

== Parish status ==
The church is in a joint parish with

- St John the Baptist's Church, Boylestone
- St Michael and All Angels' Church, Church Broughton
- St Chad's Church, Longford
- All Saints' Church, Dalbury
- St Andrew's Church, Radbourne
- St Michael's Church, Sutton-on-the-Hill
- All Saints’ Church, Trusley
