= Listed buildings in Dalbury Lees =

Dalbury Lees is a civil parish in the South Derbyshire district of Derbyshire, England. The parish contains seven listed buildings that are recorded in the National Heritage List for England. Of these, one is listed at Grade II*, the middle of the three grades, and the others are at Grade II, the lowest grade. The parish contains the villages of Dalbury and Lees and the surrounding countryside. The listed buildings consist of a church, its former rectory, and farmhouses.

== Key ==
Grade	Criteria
II*	Particularly important buildings of more than special interest
II	Buildings of national importance and special interest

== Buildings ==
Name and location	Photograph	Date	Notes	Grade
All Saints' Church; 52.90535°N 1.60966°W		13th century	The church has been altered and extended through the centuries, and it was restored and the north aisle added in 1844. The church is built in sandstone with a tile roof, and consists of a nave, a north aisle, a south brick porch, and a chancel with a north vestry. On the west gable is a bellcote containing trefoil-headed lancet windows, a moulded string course with gargoyles, and an embattled parapet.	II*
Woodhouse Farmhouse; 52.92290°N 1.60587°W	—	Early 17th century	The farmhouse was extended in the 19th century. The original part is timber framed with close studding and brick nogging on a stone plinth, and has a slate roof with a brick ridge. The extension is in red brick with painted stone dressings, a dentilled eaves band, and a hipped tile roof. There are two storeys and an L-shaped plan, with the two ranges at right angles, and a two-storey porch in the angle. There are two doorways, one with a segmental head, and the other with a semicircular-arched head, and the windows are a mix of sashes and casements. Inside the farmhouse are two inglenook fireplaces, and a close-studded timber partition.	II
Rookhills Farmhouse; 52.91250°N 1.61177°W	—	17th century	The farmhouse, which was later extended, has a timber framed core with brick nogging, and the later parts are in red brick. There is a plinth and a dentilled eaves band, and the roofs are tiled with coped gables. The house has a single storey with attics, two bays, and a rear wing. The doorway and the windows, which are casements, have cambered heads. Inside, there are inglenook fireplaces.	II
Manor Farmhouse; 52.90617°N 1.60964°W	—	Early 18th century	The farmhouse, which was later extended, is in red brick with a floor band and a tile roof. The original part has two storeys and an attic and two bays, the left bay projecting, and the extension has one storey and an attic and two bays. On the front is a porch and a doorway with a fanlight. Most of the windows are casements with segmental heads, and there are gabled dormers.	II
The Old Rectory; 52.90524°N 1.60898°W	—	Early 19th century	The rectory, later a private house, incorporates 18th-century material, and has been altered and extended. It is in red brick and has hipped slate roofs, and blue tiles on the service range. There are two storeys and an irregular plan.	II
Top Farm Farmhouse; 52.90676°N 1.60638°W	—	Early 19th century	The farmhouse is in red brick with dressings in brick and stone, and a hipped tile roof. There are two storeys, a double depth plan, a main range of three bays, and a later extension and a lean-to on the right. The central doorway, which is blocked, and the windows, which are sashes, have wedge lintels.	II
White House Farmhouse; 52.91050°N 1.60725°W		c. 1840	The farmhouse is in painted brick with painted stone dressings and a hipped slate roof. There are two storeys and four bays, the right bay polygonal. In the right bay is a doorway with a four-centred arch, and a fanlight with Y-tracery. The windows are casements that have two or three lights with pointed heads and diamond panes.	II
