= Trentham Priory =

- Interactive map of Trentham Priory

Monastery information
- Order: Augustinian
- Established: c.7th century, c.11th century or c. late 12th
- Disestablished: 1537
- Dedication: Saint Thomas the Martyr

People
- Founders: St. Werburgh, Hugh d'Avranches, 1st Earl of Chester or Ranulf de Gernon, 4th Earl of Chester

Site
- Location: Trentham, Staffordshire, England
- Coordinates: 52°57′55″N 2°12′07″W

Trentham Priory was a Christian priory in North Staffordshire, England, near the confluence between the young River Trent and two local streams, where the Trentham Estate is today.

== History ==
=== The Mercian nunnery ===
A nunnery is said to have been built on the site of the priory some time in the 7th century by Saint Werburgh, daughter of Wulfhere of Mercia. Existence of this nunnery is disputed and a connection with Saint Werburgh is disputed. There are the remains of what is said to be a stepped base for a Saxon stone cross, to be seen today in the churchyard at St. Mary and All Saints at Trentham. But it is not known if this cross base is authentic, an authentic import from elsewhere at the behest of the Sutherland family, or a later antiquarian fabrication.

=== The Augustinian Priory ===
==== Early history and foundation ====
In the 12th century, the priory itself dated its foundation to the time of William Rufus, and claimed as its founder Hugh d'Avranches, 1st Earl of Chester. There is little modern support for this theory, although the 12th century foundation charter does describe itself as "the restoration of an abbey of canons". The word abbathia, however, often translated as abbey, may have been used to describe a house of secular canons or minster.

Trentham became an Augustinians monastery house from the 1150s, under the patronage of Ranulph, Earl of Chester. Shortly after Ranulph's death, the manor of Trentham appears to have passed into the hands of King Henry II who took over patronage of the priory. Henry granted additional charters and the priory seems to have been securely established by 1155, with the pope Alexander III confirming its religious charters in 1162.

While the priory did obtain land grants and gifts in Staffordshire, Leicestershire and Derbyshire, during this time it remained, as most priories in the county, relatively modest. Gundred, wife of Roger de Beaumont, 2nd Earl of Warwick, and the Earls of Chester were among the prominent benefactors of the house.

==== Late Middle Ages ====
By the 13th century, Trentham Priory, along with Stone Priory, was considered one of the wealthier priories in Staffordshire, being assessed at 2 marks (£1 1/3). The relative wealth compared to other nearby Augustinian houses can be put down to the houses' agrarian nature. Throughout the 13th, 14th and early 15th centuries the priory accumulated a large amount of land for cultivation and pasture including land around Stone from Hulton Abbey.

In the late 13th century a dispute arose over the patronage of the priory between the Earls of Lancaster, in their capacity as lords of the manor of Newcastle-under-Lyme, and the Crown. In 1322, when the newly elected prior pledged an oath of fealty to the Earl of Lancaster, the house was fined 40 marks (£26 2/3) by the Crown. A court case in 1327 found that Henry III had left the patronage of the priory and the manor of Newcastle-under-Lyme to his son Edmund Crouchback, Earl of Lancaster. It was not until, after lengthy disputes between the two parties, 1344 that the Crown finally secured control of Trentham Priory. The house's circumstances by this time had been much reduced and further burdens, including the maintenance of retired royal servants and soldiers, only added to its poverty.

==== Dissolution ====
Henry VIII broke with the church in Rome in 1534, making himself supreme head of the church in England and in 1535 he commissioned the Valor Ecclesiasticus, a survey of the finances of the church in England, Wales and the English controlled parts of Ireland. The Valor Ecclesiasticus shows that the priory's possessions were worth a total of £122 3s 2d and it had a net income of £75 14s, making it one of the wealthier Augustinian priories in the country. The house was suppressed in 1537, with the prior being awarded a pension of £16.

The property was sold by the Crown to Charles Brandon, 1st Duke of Suffolk in 1538, who in turn sold it to Sir Thomas Pope. Pope sold the priory to one James Leveson. The Dukes of Sutherland built Trentham Hall on the site, remaining there until 1912.

Trentham Priory's small square tower is claimed to be preserved at Dalbury Lees in nearby Derbyshire: Glover states that "The small church tower formerly belonged to Trentham Priory, in Staffordshire". Dalbury was recorded as supporting Trentham Priory from the early 1290s onwards.
