= St Mary the Virgin's Church, Newton Solney =

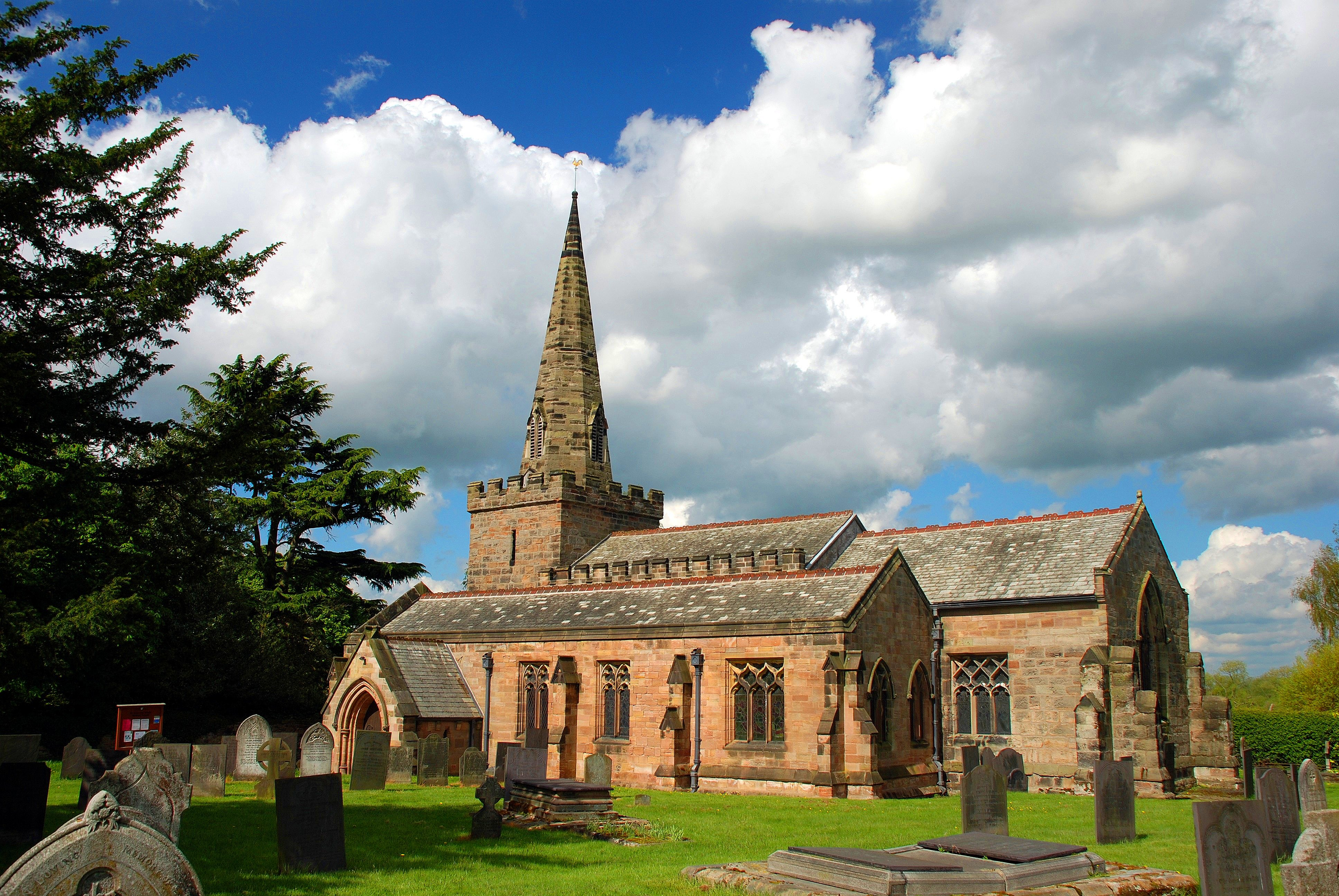
- St Mary the Virgin's Church, Newton Solney
- St Mary the Virgin's Church, Newton Solney
- 52°49′41.19″N 1°35′14.51″W
- Location: Newton Solney
- Country: England
- Denomination: Church of England

History
- Dedication: St Mary the Virgin

Architecture
- Heritage designation: Grade II* listed

Administration
- Province: Province of Canterbury
- Diocese: Diocese of Derby
- Archdeaconry: Derby
- Deanery: Repton
- Parish: Newton Solney

St Mary the Virgin's Church, Newton Solney is a Grade II* listed parish church in the Church of England in Newton Solney, Derbyshire.

== History ==
The church dates from the 14th century.

It was restored between 1880 and 1882 by Frederick Josias Robinson. The south aisle was extended south and east to provide additional accommodation. The organ transept was extended. A new timber roof was placed over the whole church. The walls were cleaned of plaster, and the pews were replaced with open pews. The floors were lowered around 18 inches and laid with Hereford tiles by the William Godwin Company of Lugwardine, Hereford, and a new oak pulpit was acquired. A reredos was erected by Robert Ratcliff. The restoration cost in the region of £3,700 (equivalent to £384,833 in 2025). The church re-opened on Easter Monday 1882.

== Organ ==
The pipe organ was installed by Bevington & Sons and opened on 20 July 1861. A specification of the organ can be found on the National Pipe Organ Register.

== Parish status ==
The church is in a joint parish with:

- St Saviour's Church, Foremark
- St. Wystan's Church, Repton

== See also ==
- Grade II* listed buildings in South Derbyshire
- Listed buildings in Newton Solney
