= Badway Green =

Coordinates: 52.900°N 1.687°W

- Location within Derbyshire
- OS grid reference: SK211336
- District: South Derbyshire
- Shire county: Derbyshire
- Region: East Midlands
- Country: England
- Sovereign state: United Kingdom
- Post town: DERBY
- Postcode district: DE65
- Police: Derbyshire
- Fire: Derbyshire
- Ambulance: East Midlands

Badway Green is a piece of common land in the parish of Church Broughton in Derbyshire, England.
