= Listed buildings in Osleston and Thurvaston =

Osleston and Thurvaston is a civil parish in the South Derbyshire district of Derbyshire, England. The parish contains six listed buildings that are recorded in the National Heritage List for England. All the listed buildings are designated at Grade II, the lowest of the three grades, which is applied to "buildings of national importance and special interest". The parish contains the villages of Osleston and Thurvaston and is otherwise rural. The listed buildings consist of three farmhouses, a house with an attached outbuilding, a well house, and a chapel.

== Buildings ==
Name and location	Photograph	Date	Notes
Osleston Hall; 52.93132°N 1.63229°W	—	Late 16th century	A farmhouse that is partly timber framed on a plinth, partly encased in red brick, and rendered, and it has a tile roof. There are two storeys and attics and three bays, with a projecting cross-wing on the east. On the south front is a gabled porch, most of the windows are casements, there is a sash window, and in the attic is a single-light window. Inside, there are inglenook fireplaces.
The Elms; 52.91981°N 1.62845°W	—	Early 17th century	A timber framed farmhouse on a plinth, encased in brick in the early 18th century, refronted in the later 19th century, and partly rendered. It has floor bands, a tile roof, two storeys and attics, a double depth plan, and a front of two bays. On the front is a gabled porch, the ground floor windows are sashes with segmental heads, and above are casement windows with cambered heads. Inside, there is exposed timber framing and inglenook fireplaces.
Well house 52.93128°N 1.63985°W	—	1699	The well house was probably relocated to its present site in the 19th century. It is in sandstone, and is 1 metre (3 ft 3 in) square and 1.5 metres (4 ft 11 in) high. On the west side is a doorway with a four-centred arched and dated lintel. The well house has a pyramidal cap with three tiers, and a ball finial with a tapering stem. On the south side, a windlass handle protrudes though a crude aperture, and three is a similar aperture on the north side.
Homestead Farmhouse; 52.91983°N 1.64593°W	—	Early 18th century	The farmhouse is in painted brick with brick dressings, a floor band, and a tile roof with brick coped gables and kneelers. There are two storeys and four bays. The doorway and the windows, which are casements, have flat-arched heads.
Osleston Hall Cottage and outbuilding 52.92996°N 1.63282°W		Late 18th century	The house and attached outbuilding under a continuous roof are in red brick with brick dressings, a dentilled eaves band, and a tile roof. There are two storeys and attics, the house has two bays, and the outbuilding, which protrudes slightly on the right, has a single bay. The doorway has a divided fanlight, the windows in the house have casement windows with segmental heads, and at the top is a pair of louvred doors. The outbuilding has a doorway and above is a blocked opening, both with segmental heads.
Primitive Methodist Chapel; 52.90888°N 1.65008°W		1838	The chapel is in red brick with brick dressings, a dentilled eaves band, and a tile roof. There is a single storey, two bays, and a lean-to on the right. In the centre is a gabled porch, and double doors under a chamfered stone lintel. This is flanked by semicircular windows, and above the porch is an inscribed and dated stone plaque. At the rear are two windows with pointed heads and Gothic tracery. The lean-to has a doorway with a lintel and incised voussoirs.
