= Listed buildings in Sutton on the Hill =

Sutton on the Hill is a civil parish in the South Derbyshire district of Derbyshire, England. It contains eight listed buildings that are recorded in the National Heritage List for England. Of these, two are at Grade II*, the middle of the three grades, and the others are at Grade II, the lowest grade. The parish contains the village of Sutton on the Hill and the surrounding area. The listed buildings consist of a church, tombstones in the churchyard and the lychgate, a house and associated structures, a farmhouse and a former watermill.

== Key ==
Grade	Criteria
II*	Particularly important buildings of more than special interest
II	Buildings of national importance and special interest

== Buildings ==
Name and location	Photograph	Date	Notes	Grade
St Michael's Church; 52.90507°N 1.64846°W		14th century	The oldest part of the church is the steeple, the spire was rebuilt in 1841, and again in 1863 when the body of the church was also rebuilt. The church is in sandstone with a slate roof and crested ridge tiles, and consists of a nave, a north aisle, a south porch, a lower chancel with a north vestry, and a west steeple. The steeple has a tower with three stages, stepped buttresses, a south pointed doorway with a chamfered surround, a two-light pointed west window, a clock face on the south, and a projecting stair turret on the north. In the top stage is a string course and two-light bell openings, over which is a moulded corbel table, and a broach spire with lucarnes and a ball finial.	II*
Pair of tombstones, St Michael's Church; 52.90492°N 1.64835°W	—	Early 18th century	The tombstones in the churchyard consist of two thick stone slabs. The west faces are plain, and on the east faces are scrolled swan-neck pediments containing acanthus leaves. On the north tomb are pilaster strips, and a barely legible inscription.	II
Tombstone, St Michael's Church; 52.90498°N 1.64810°W	—	1733	The tombstone in the churchyard consists of a thick stone slab with a plain west face. On the east face is a scrolled swan-neck pediment containing acanthus leaves, carried on fluted pilasters with Corinthian capitals. Below is a partly legible inscription.	II
Sutton Hall and outbuildings 52.90130°N 1.65007°W	—	Late 18th century	A vicarage, later a private house, it was extended in about 1820. It is in stone and brick, partly rendered, with roofs of lead and slate. The front range has two storeys, and the extension to the rear has three storeys. The central bay on the front has an embattled parapet, and is flanked by full height canted bay windows, outside which are later bays with embattled parapets. The central doorway has pilasters, and the windows are sashes, those in the upper floor with pointed heads. At the rear is a courtyard containing a gateway with square embattled towers, one in brick, the other is stone, with rose windows. At the northeast corner is a stable range with an octagonal brick tower.	II*
Sutton Mill; 52.90043°N 1.65632°W	—	Late 18th century	A watermill converted into a house in about 1980, it is in red brick with a sawtooth eaves band and a tile roof. There are two storeys with attics, and an L-shaped plan. The building contains a variety of doorway and windows.	II
Cheetham Arms Farmhouse; 52.89988°N 1.65262°W		Early 19th century	A public house, later a farmhouse, it was extended in the late 19th century. The building is in red brick with dressings in brick and stone, a sawtooth eaves band, and a tile roof. There are two storeys, the original part has two bays, and the extension to the right is slightly recessed and has two bays. In the centre of the earlier part is a stuccoed basket-arched recess and a doorway with a segmental head, and above it is a blank wooden signboard. In the right part is a doorway with a wedge lintel. The windows in both parts are sashes, or sash-type casements, all with wedge lintels.	II
Crinkle-Crankle wall, Sutton Hall; 52.90108°N 1.65052°W	—	Early 19th century	The garden wall is in red brick with moulded brick copings. It is a wavy wall about 10 feet (3.0 m) high that runs west, then south. At the south end is a semicircular-headed doorway.	II
Lychgate, St Michael's Church; 52.90480°N 1.64842°W		c. 1863	The lychgate at the entrance to the churchyard has sandstone walls with wooden gates between. The superstructure is in timber, with an arcade of pointed arches on the sides, and at the ends are cruck trusses carrying the roof. The roof is in slate, with crested ridge tiles and two Celtic crosses.	II
