= Thurvaston =

Village in Derbyshire, United Kingdom

Coordinates: 52.9396°N 1.6386°W

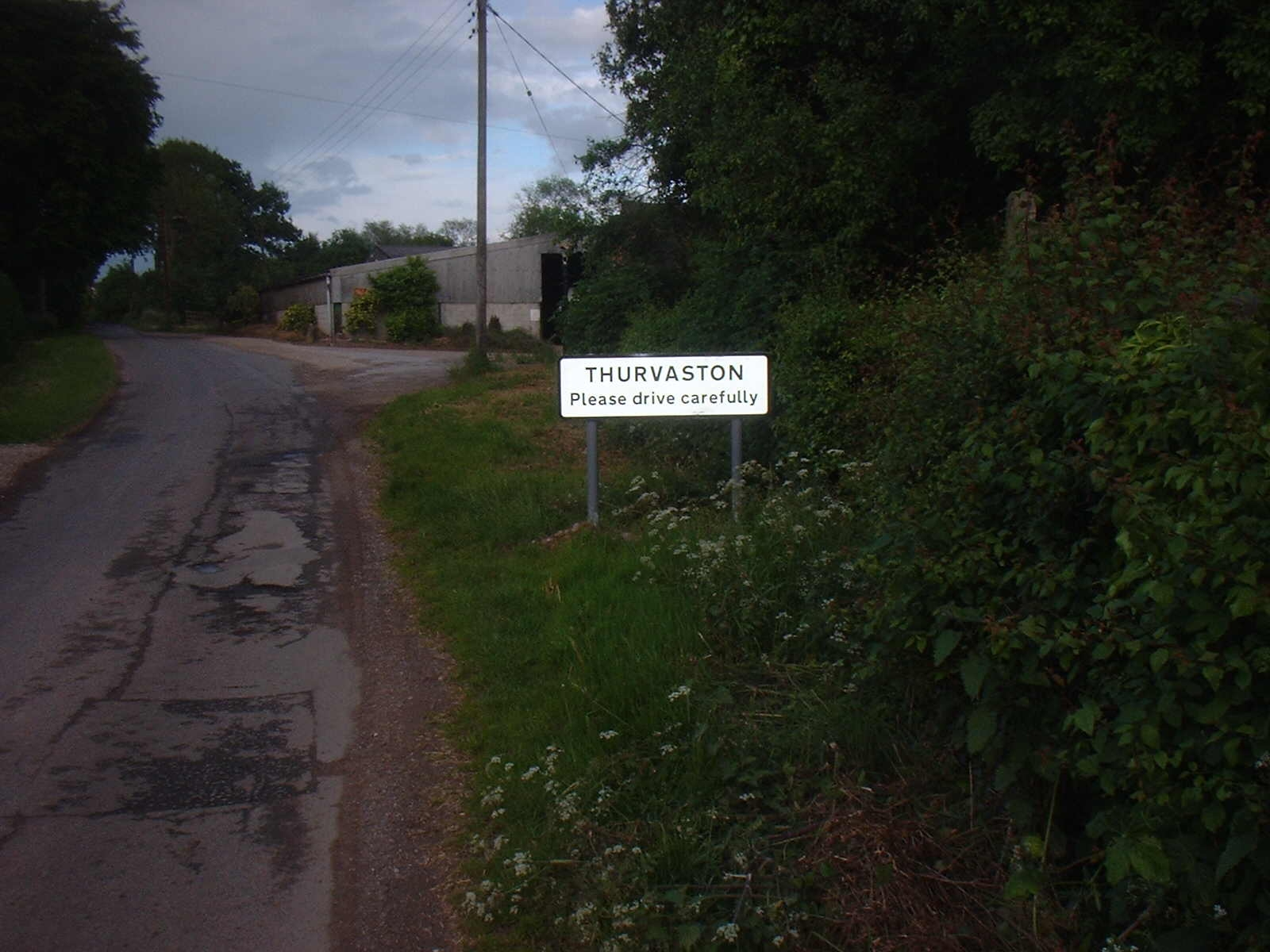
entering the rural village

Thurvaston is a small village in South Derbyshire. In 1970 the population (together with Osleston) was put at 200. This represents a general fall since 1871 when the population was just below 400. As at the census 2011, the population is now listed in the civil parish of Osleston and Thurvaston.

== History ==
Recent excavations have revealed extensive archaeological remains dating back from before 1400. In 2006, both Thurvaston and nearby Sutton-on-the-Hill were identified as sites for future housing. This was based on a survey which identified the high cost of housing and the high number of bedrooms per residence compared with the small number of children in the area.

== See also ==
- Listed buildings in Osleston and Thurvaston
