= Hare Hills Tuff =

- Stratigraphic range: Neoproterozoic
- Type: Formation
- Unit of: Marystown Group

Lithology
- Primary: Felsic volcanics

Location
- Region: Newfoundland
- Country: Canada
- Occurrence of the Hare Hills Tuff in southeastern Newfoundland

The Hare Hills Tuff is a formation cropping out in Newfoundland.
