= Harehill =

Village in Derbyshire, England

Coordinates: 52.9166°N 1.7412°W

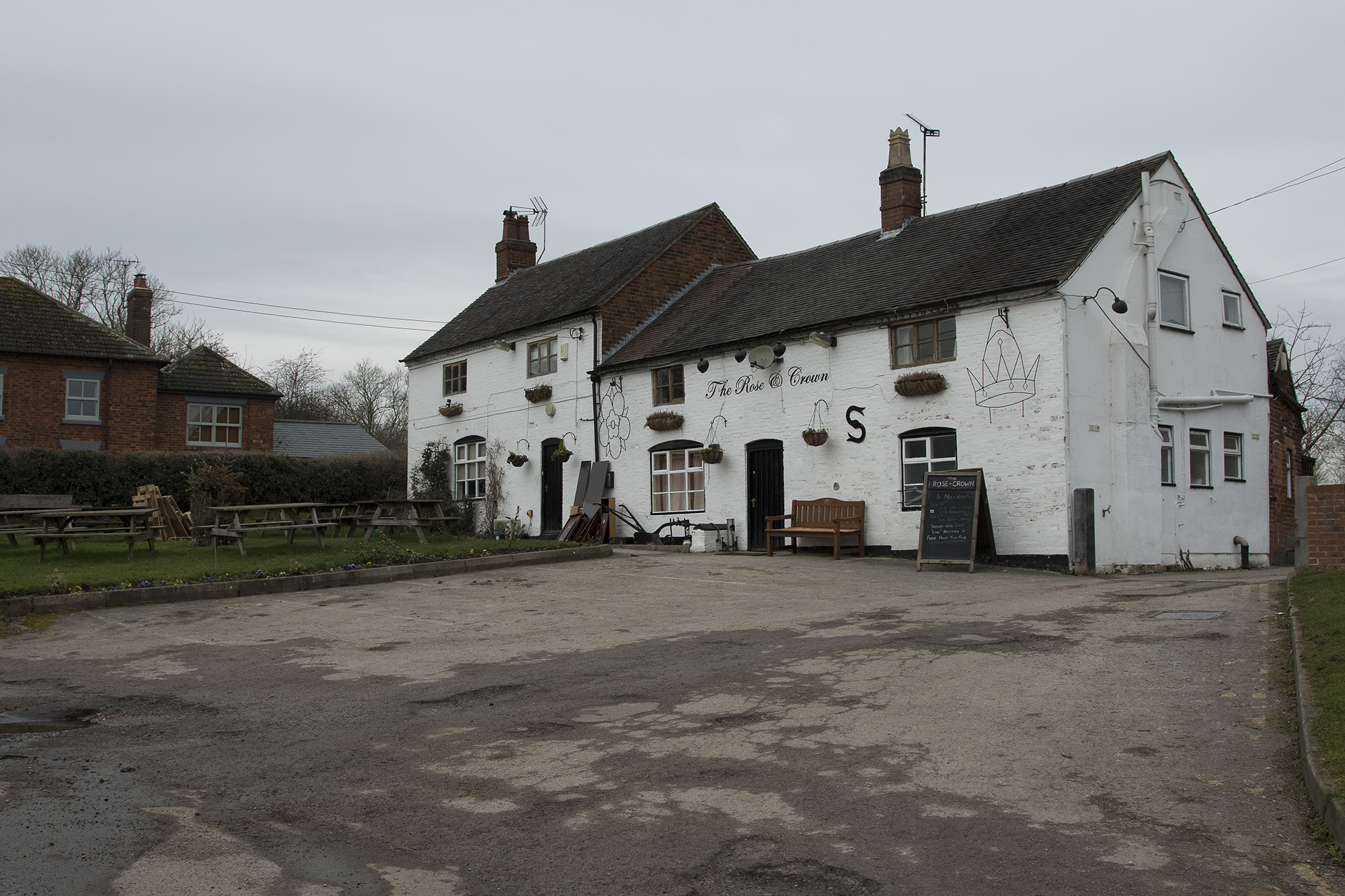
- Rose and Crown pub

- Location within Derbyshire
- Civil parish: Boylestone
- District: Derbyshire Dales
- Shire county: Derbyshire
- Region: East Midlands
- Country: England
- Sovereign state: United Kingdom
- Police: Derbyshire
- Fire: Derbyshire
- Ambulance: East Midlands

Harehill is a village in the civil parish of Boylestone, in the Derbyshire Dales district, in the county of Derbyshire, England.

== Nearby settlements ==
Nearby settlements include the town of Uttoxeter and the village of Boylestone.

== Amenities ==
Harehill has a place of worship and a pub.

== See also ==
- Listed buildings in Boylestone
