= Newton Solney =

Village in Derbyshire, England

Coordinates: 52.828°N 1.582°W

- Location within Derbyshire
- Population: 659 (2011)
- OS grid reference: SK282256
- District: South Derbyshire
- Shire county: Derbyshire
- Region: East Midlands
- Country: England
- Sovereign state: United Kingdom
- Post town: BURTON-ON-TRENT
- Postcode district: DE15
- Dialling code: 01283
- Police: Derbyshire
- Fire: Derbyshire
- Ambulance: East Midlands
- UK Parliament: South Derbyshire

Newton Solney is a small village and civil parish in South Derbyshire, England, located about two miles (3 km) from the East Staffordshire border, near to Burton upon Trent. The population of the civil parish as of the 2011 census was 659. Its nearest neighbour is Repton, situated about two miles (3 km) to the northeast.

== History ==
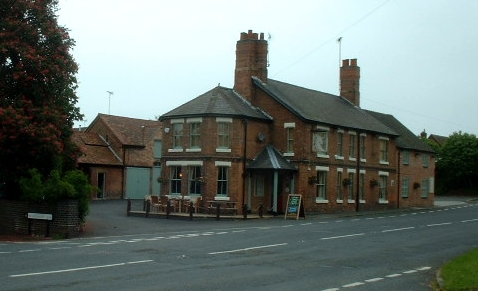
The Unicorn

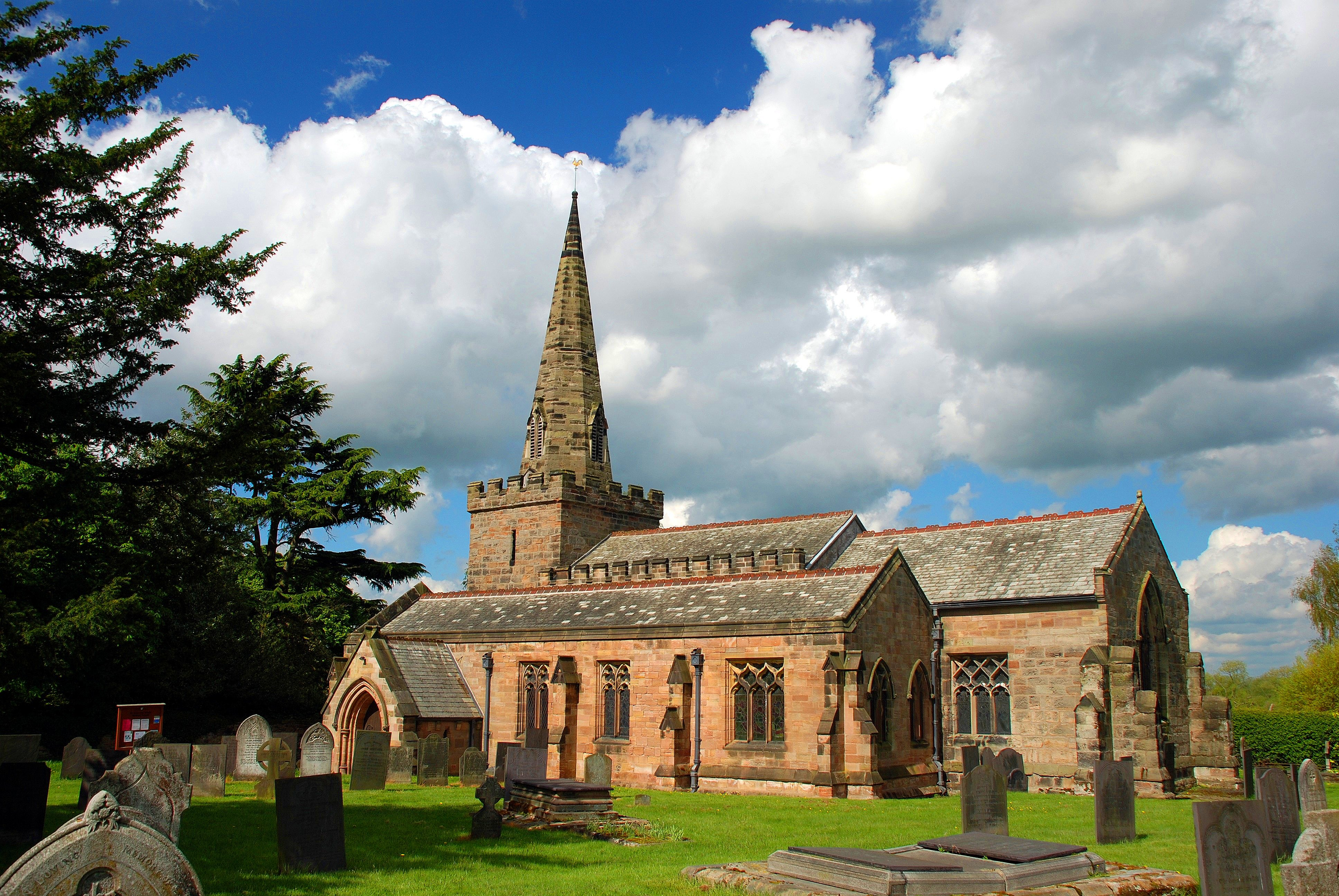
St Mary the Virgin's Church, Newton Solney

When the Anglian invaders came up the Trent in the sixth century, they would have found Newton Solney a very attractive place, sitting at the confluence of two rivers, the Trent, which could be forded here and the Dove. They called it Niwantune meaning the new farm and from this tiny nucleus, the village slowly grew. When the Vikings, in their turn, raided Mercia and destroyed the Saxon monastery at Repton (873–4) they may also have sacked and occupied Newton Solney.

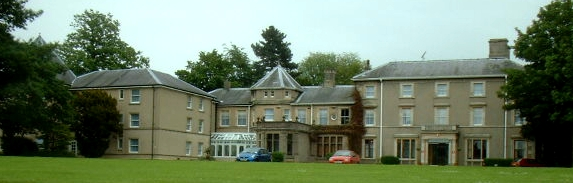
The Newton Park Hotel

This manor was in the Domesday Book in 1086. Under the title of "The land of the King (in Derbyshire)" it said:

In Newton Solney and Bretby Ælfgar had seven carucates of land to the geld. There is land for six ploughs. There the king has one plough and nineteen villans and one bordar with five ploughs. There are 12 acres (49,000 m^{2}) of meadow, woodland pasture two leagues long and three furlongs broad. TRE as now worth one hundred shillings.

The village was passed over to Norman de Solney some time after 1086. In 1205 Alured de Solennaia, a Norman knight, inherited Newton. By about 1300 it became known as Newton Solney.

Norman knights were passionately fond of hunting and the de Solneys carved a hunting park out of the extensive woodland. The first church was built in the twelfth century. There would also have been a manor house, probably somewhere near the present Newton Park Hotel. The lord of the manor would have had a mill and fishing rights on the river and a tithe barn is recorded in 1528. With the death of John, the last male de Solney in 1390, the manor passed through several important local families and was finally bought by a local attorney, Abraham Hoskins who built the house, now the hotel.

== Modern development ==
The village slowly grew to a population of 181 in 1801 and now has about 800, the increase mainly resulting from a new housing development off Blacksmith's Lane. In 1894, part of the parish of Winshill was added to Newton Solney. Local landowners the Every family rebuilt the former Rock Tower on Church Lane as Rock House, a Victorian villa overlooking the river Trent. The Main Road was declared a conservation area in 1978.

The village has a school, two pubs and a hotel. The Village Hall was built in 1932 to the designs of the architect Arthur Eaton and Son.

== See also ==
- Listed buildings in Newton Solney
