= St Michael's Church, Sutton-on-the-Hill =

St Michael’s Church, Sutton-on-the-Hill
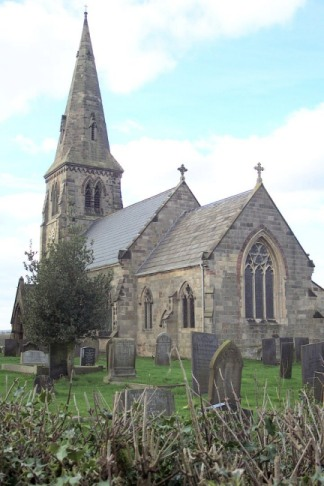
- St Michael’s Church, Sutton-on-the-Hill
- St Michael’s Church, Sutton-on-the-Hill
- 52°54′26.72″N 1°39′7.32″W
- Location: Sutton on the Hill
- Country: England
- Denomination: Church of England

History
- Dedication: St Michael

Architecture
- Heritage designation: Grade II* listed
- Architect(s): Giles and Brookhouse
- Completed: 1863

Specifications
- Height: 105 feet (32 m)

Administration
- Province: Province of York
- Diocese: Diocese of Derby
- Archdeaconry: Derby
- Deanery: Longford
- Parish: Sutton-on-the-Hill

St Michael's Church, Sutton-on-the-Hill is a Grade II* listed parish church in the Church of England in Sutton on the Hill, Derbyshire.

== History ==
The church dates from the 14th century, but with the exception of the chancel, was very heavily rebuilt in 1863 by the architects Giles and Brookhouse of Derby. The tower and spire was raised to 105 feet (32 m), 25 feet (7.6 m) higher than the one it replaced. The east window was filled with stained glass by Hardman & Co. of Birmingham. The chancel floor was laid with Minton encaustic tiles. A Gurney Stove was installed for heating. The contractor was W.H. and J. Slater.

== Organ ==
The organ dates from 1881 and is by Harston & Son. A specification of the organ can be found on the National Pipe Organ Register.

== Parish status ==
The church is in a joint parish with

- St John the Baptist's Church, Boylestone
- St Michael and All Angels' Church, Church Broughton
- St Chad's Church, Longford
- All Saints' Church, Dalbury
- Christ Church, Long Lane
- St Andrew's Church, Radbourne
- All Saints’ Church, Trusley

== See also ==
- Grade II* listed buildings in South Derbyshire
- Listed buildings in Sutton on the Hill
