= Barton Blount =

Village and civil parish in the South Derbyshire district of Derbyshire, England

Coordinates: 52.91°N 1.692°W

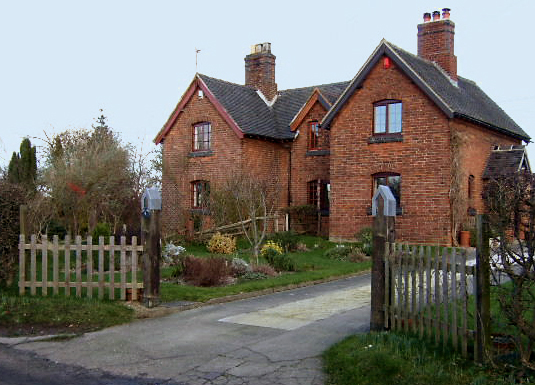
- Barton Cottages

- Barton Blount parish highlighted within Derbyshire
- Population: 74 (2001)
- OS grid reference: SK208347
- District: South Derbyshire
- Shire county: Derbyshire
- Region: East Midlands
- Country: England
- Sovereign state: United Kingdom
- Post town: DERBY
- Postcode district: DE65
- Police: Derbyshire
- Fire: Derbyshire
- Ambulance: East Midlands

Barton Blount is a village and civil parish in the South Derbyshire district of Derbyshire, England, between Derby and Uttoxeter. According to the 2001 census it had a population of 74. The population remained at fewer than 100 for the 2011 Census. Details are included in the civil parish of Church Broughton.

== History ==
A former name, Barton Bakepuys, can be seen in a record featuring Thomas Blount, esq, in 1422. It was the seat of Sir Walter Blount, a key supporter of John of Gaunt, who bought it from Nicholas Bakepus in the 1380s and renamed it.

During the civil war in October 1644, in the reign of Charles I, the manor house was garrisoned for Parliamentary forces, and a skirmish took place in the neighbourhood between these forces and the Royalist troops from Tutbury Castle. This manor house, Barton Hall was the home of Francis Bradshaw who was High Sheriff of Derbyshire in 1851.

=== Chapel of St Chad ===
The former parish church and Barton Hall were the centre of the medieval village. The church is a Grade II listed building and also a scheduled monument. It was damaged during the civil war, and by the early 18th century was in a dilapidated condition. It was rebuilt in 1714, probably using medieval material, by Samuel Taborer; the lower courses of the walls are medieval.

The interior, which seats sixty, was modified in the mid 19th century, and the stained-glass west window is late 19th-century. The font, with an octagonal bowl, is 14th-century. The church was declared redundant in 1976, and has since been a private chapel.

=== Remains of medieval settlement ===
To the north, west and south of Barton Hall are the remains of the medieval settlement, now a scheduled monument. Earthworks to the north-east of the church show the location of building platforms and adjacent plots of land, on either side of a sunken track, once the main street of the village.

Further to the north and north-east is an area which was excavated in the late 1960s and early 1970s, and has since been ploughed. It showed occupation from the 10th to 15th century. There was evidence of simple timber buildings of the early 13th century, and later more substantial timber-framed buildings.

There is the site of a decoy pond about 150 metres (490 ft) south-west of Barton Hall. Its dimensions are about 100 by 60 metres (330 by 200 ft), and it had an island about 25 by 25 metres (82 by 82 ft). At the north of the pond, and perhaps also at the south, was a narrow curving channel or "pipe", along which ducks would be enticed.

== See also ==
- Listed buildings in Barton Blount
