= Dalbury Lees =

Civil parish in Derbyshire, England

Coordinates: 52.910°N 1.607°W

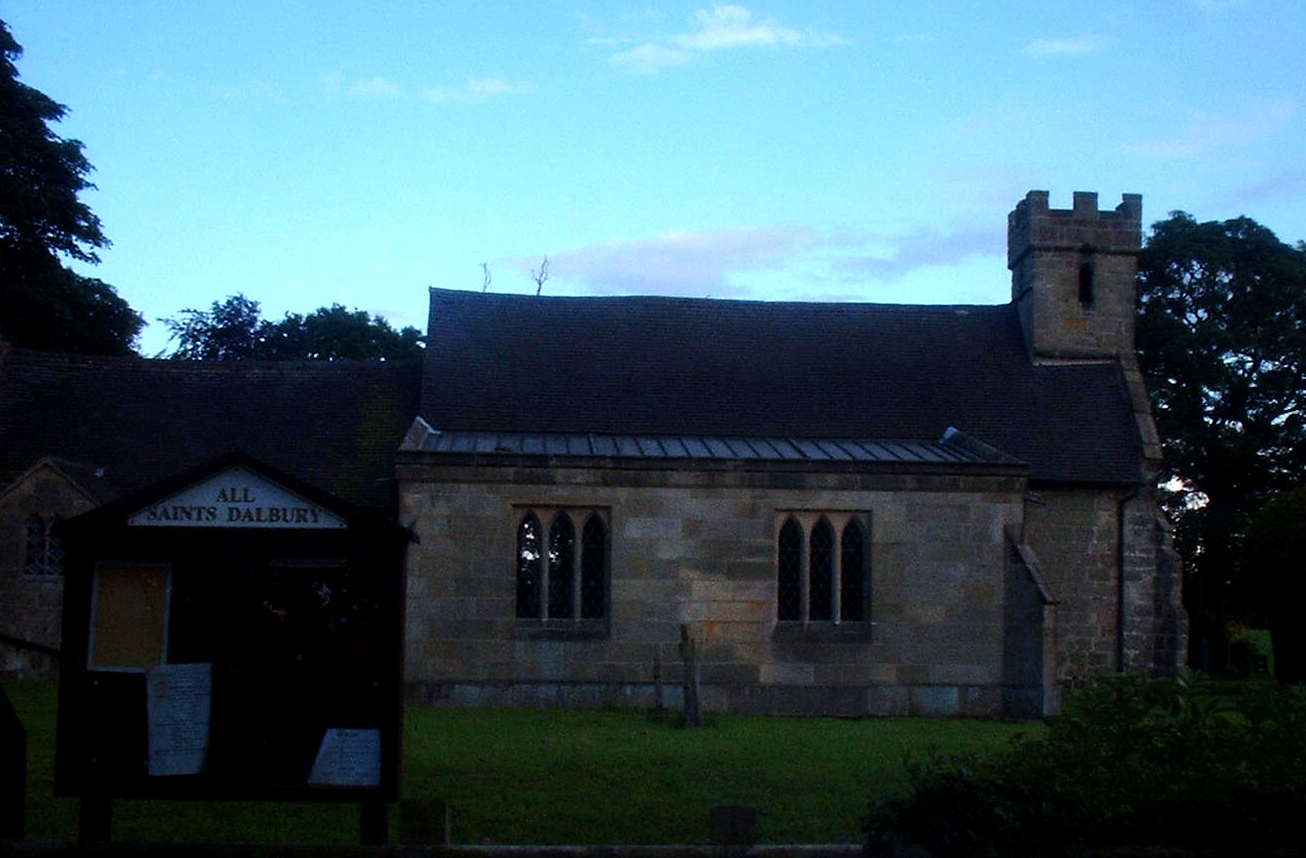
- All Saints' Church, Dalbury.

- Location within Derbyshire
- Population: 306 (2011)
- OS grid reference: SK265348
- District: South Derbyshire
- Shire county: Derbyshire
- Region: East Midlands
- Country: England
- Sovereign state: United Kingdom
- Post town: ASHBOURNE
- Postcode district: DE6
- Police: Derbyshire
- Fire: Derbyshire
- Ambulance: East Midlands

Dalbury Lees is a parish in south Derbyshire. The population of the civil parish as taken at the 2011 Census (including Trusley) was 306. It is about six miles (10 km) from both Burton-on-Trent and Derby and just under four miles (6 km) from Egginton. The parish contains the villages of Dalbury and Lees which are just under 2 miles (3.2 km) apart from one another. Dalbury Lees has been known, as Dalbury and as Dalbury with Lees, but Dalbury Lees is the preferred term, which is shown on Ordnance Survey Explorer maps.

== History ==
In late Victorian times the name was said to have developed from the Old Norse deity name Dellingr, Dalbury is mentioned twice in the Domesday Book where it is spelt Delbebi and Dellingeberie. The book records firstly that there were three bovates which are berewicks of the manor of Mickleover which at that time belonged to the Abbey of Burton. The Abbey held various manors including Appleby Magna, Winshill and Stapenhill - these were all within Derbyshire at that time.

Later the book lists under the title of “The lands of Henry de Ferrers

”In Dalbury Godric had two carucates of land to the geld. There is land for four ploughs. There are now two ploughs in demesne and six villans and one bordar with two ploughs. There is a priest and a church and twenty acres of meadow, woodland pasture one furlong long and half a league broad. TRE worth forty shillings now sixty shillings. Robert holds it.“

Dalbury is the smaller of the two villages with a handful of houses, a church, and during the nineteenth century a school that could take sixty children. The small church is said to have the former tower of Trentham Priory... "The small church tower formerly belonged to Trentham Priory, in Staffordshire".

Lees on the other hand is larger with around 70 houses and several farms. The Cow pub is the communal centre of the village and the green opposite is frequently used for village fêtes and car boot sales. A new village hall was recently completed on the main road through the village.

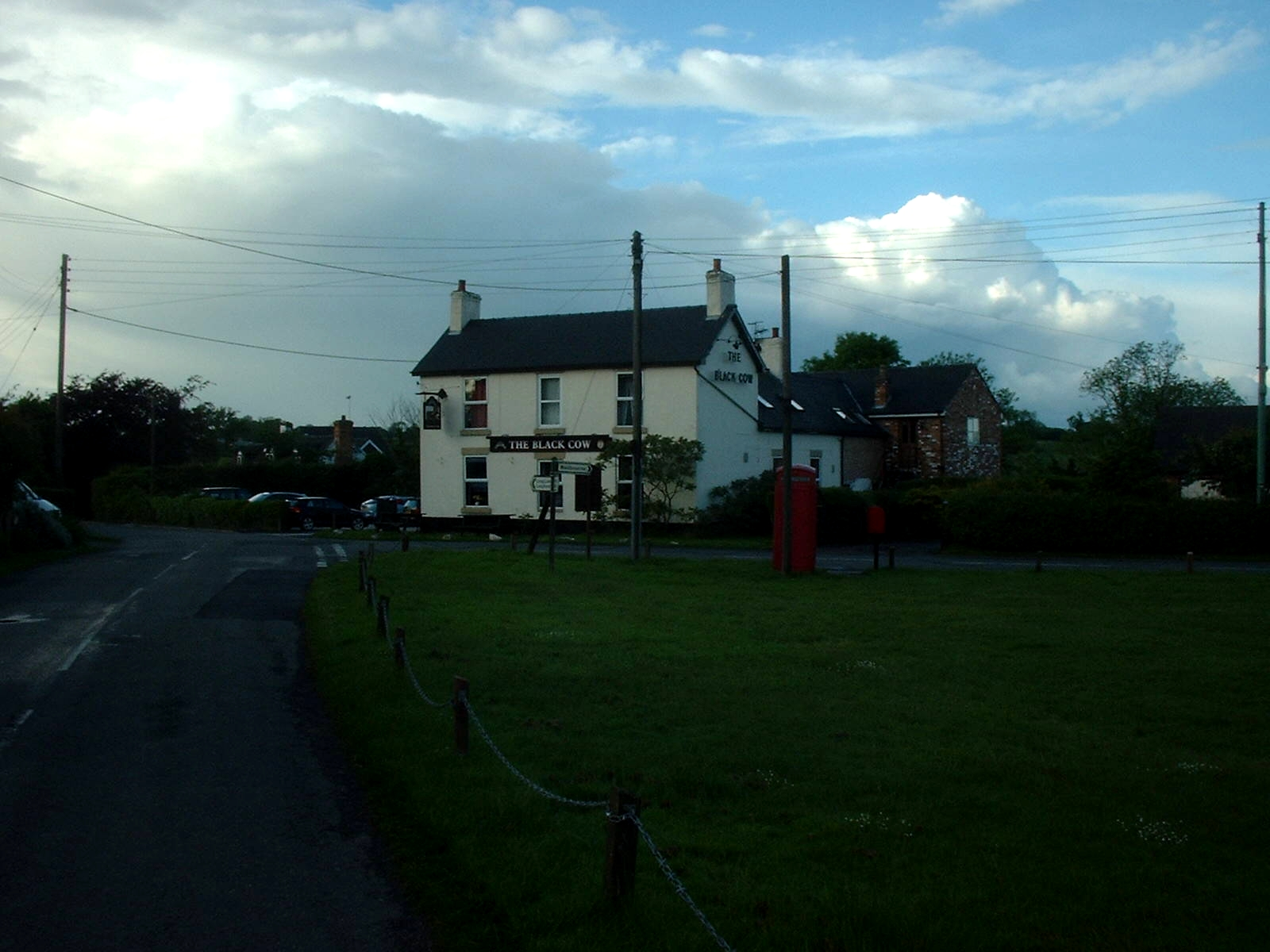
'The Black Cow'.

== See also ==
- Listed buildings in Dalbury Lees
