= Sutton on the Hill =

Civil parish in Derbyshire, England

Coordinates: 52.900°N 1.653°W

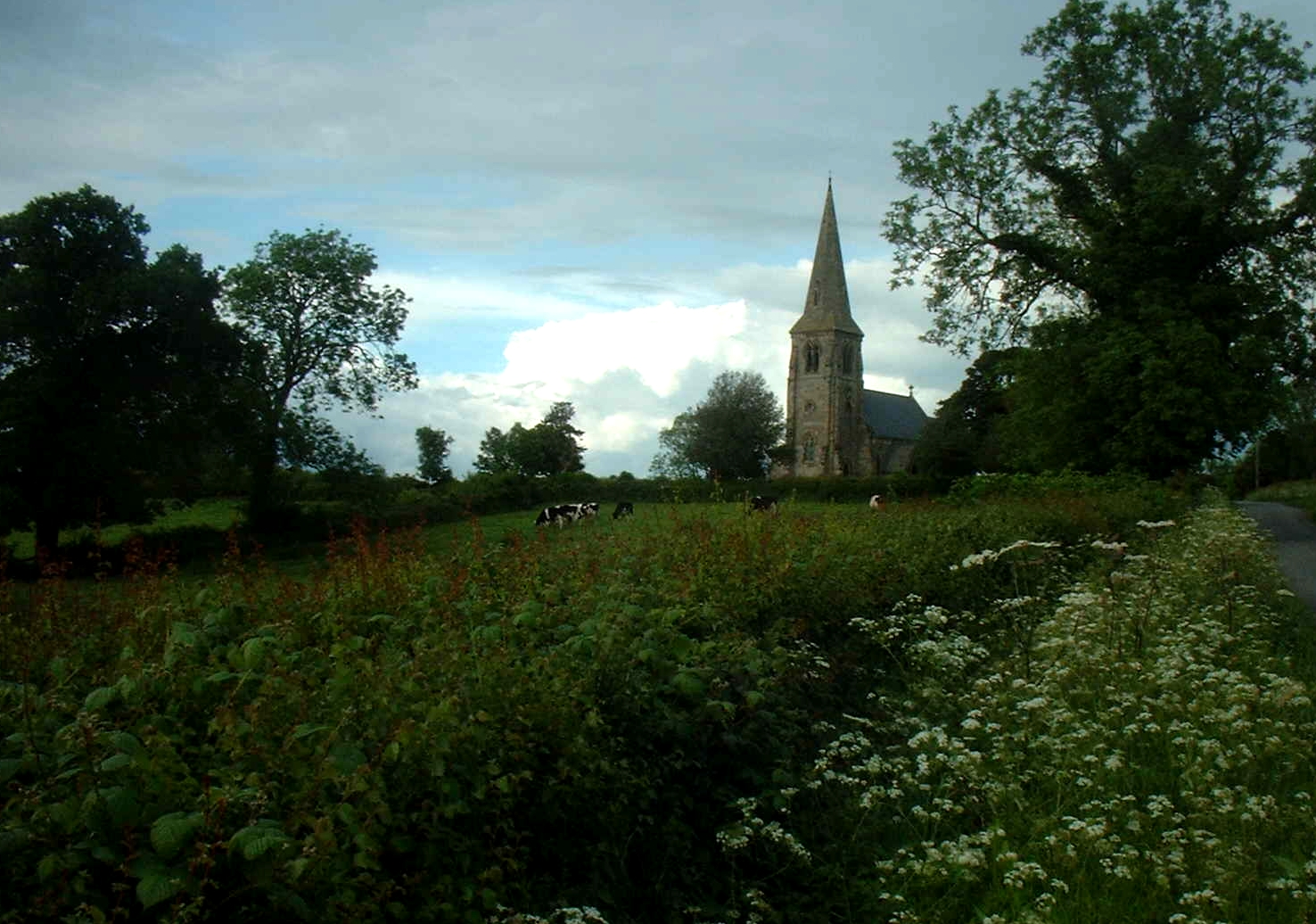
- St Michael's Church, Sutton-on-the-Hill

- Location within Derbyshire
- Population: 123 (2011)
- OS grid reference: SK234336
- District: South Derbyshire
- Shire county: Derbyshire
- Region: East Midlands
- Country: England
- Sovereign state: United Kingdom
- Post town: ASHBOURNE
- Postcode district: DE6
- Dialling code: 01283
- Police: Derbyshire
- Fire: Derbyshire
- Ambulance: East Midlands

Sutton-on-the-Hill is a parish in south Derbyshire, eight miles (13 km) west of Derby. The population of the civil parish taken at the 2011 Census was 123. The village is widely spread out and contains both a church (which, unlike most of the village, is on the hill) and a chapel. It was described as "a parish, with two townships and a hamlet" in the 1870s. Now it has no shop or post office and limited public transport links. Sutton on the Hill is primarily an agricultural area with former dairy farms at either end of the village, along with the Sutton Estate Farm. The village school has been converted into a village hall and has a nursery school for the local villages.

== History ==
Sutton on the Hill is mentioned twice in the Domesday Book where it is spelt Sudtun and Sudtune. The book says there is one carucate which is a berewick of the manor of Mickleover which at that time belonged to the Abbey of Burton together with other berewicks which included Dalbury, Sudbury and Hilton.

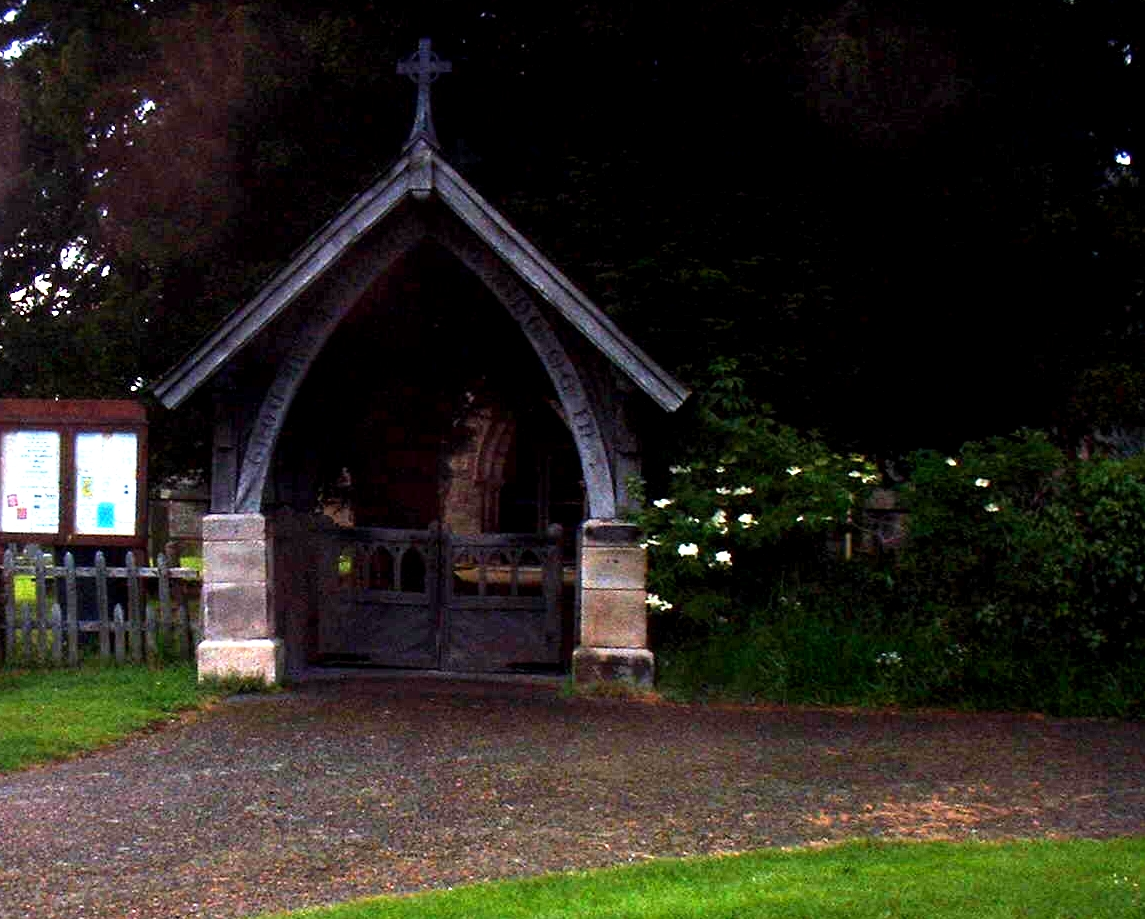
The Lychgate

Later, the book lists under the title of "The lands of Henry de Ferrers":

"In Sutton on the hill Thorir, Alweald, Ubeinn, Leofwine and Eadric had two carucates of land to the geld. There is land for three ploughs. There are now three ploughs in demesne and nine villans having seven ploughs. There is a priest and a church and one mill rendering 10 shillings and twenty four acres of meadow. TRE as now sixty shillings. Wazelin holds it."

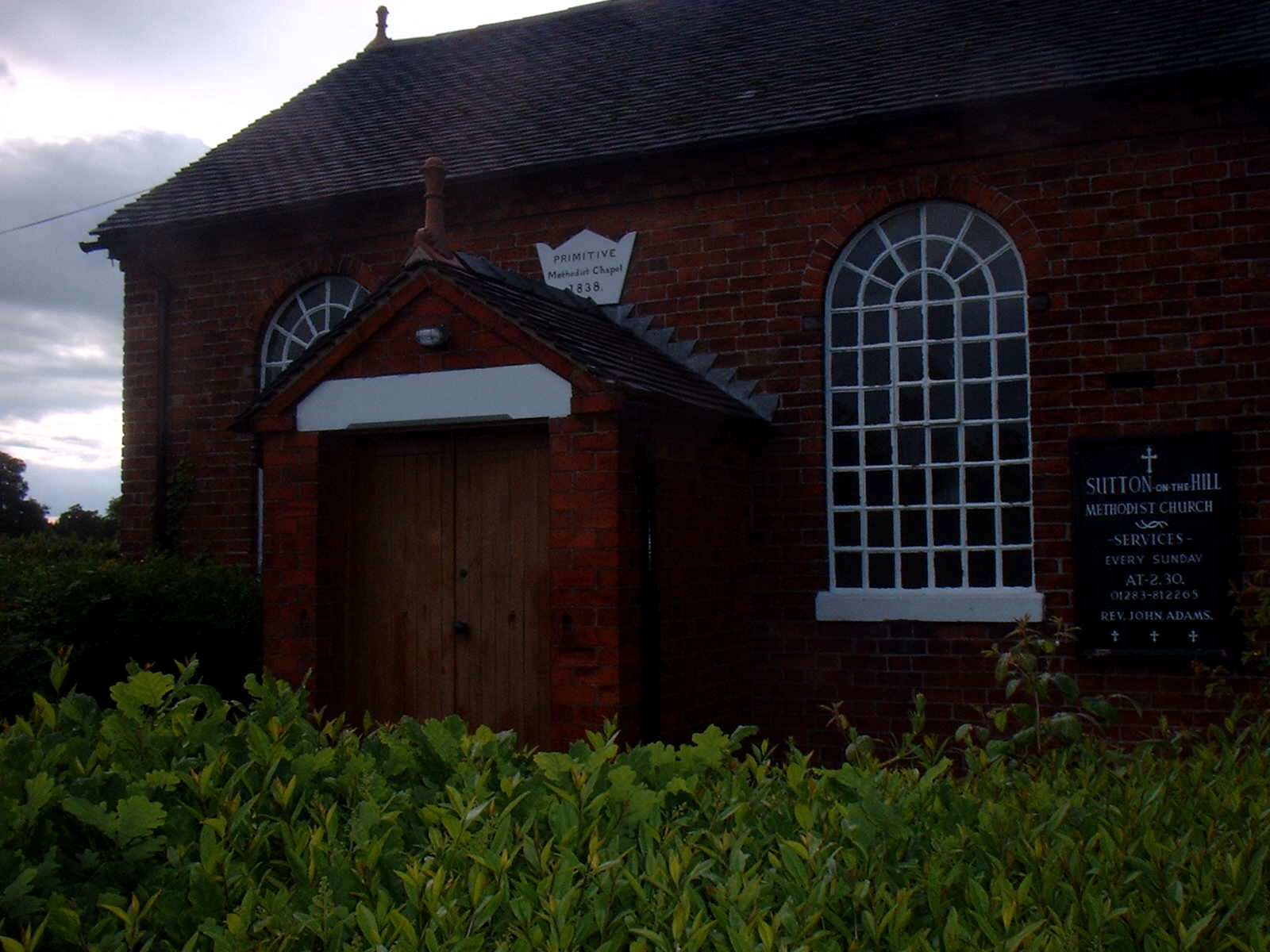
The 1838 Chapel

The parish of Sutton on the Hill used to contain the settlements of Ash, Osleston and Thurvaston. The manor had at one time been owned by the Blue Coat Hospital and Library in Manchester as it was bought as part of charity set up in the will of Humphrey Chetham. The rights to appoint the vicar was purchased by German Buckston(e) in 1834. In 1801 Sutton on the Hill's total population was 388. In 1901 it was 124, and by 1961 it was 95.

== See also ==
- Listed buildings in Sutton on the Hill
