= Boylestone =

Village in Derbyshire, England

Coordinates: 52.9202°N 1.7308°W

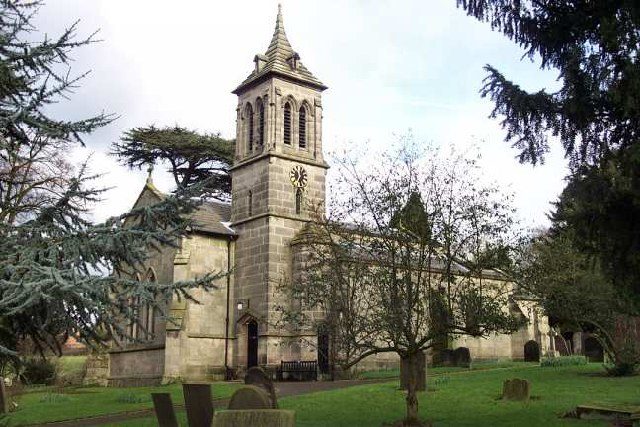
- St John the Baptist's Church, Boylestone

- Boylestone parish highlighted within Derbyshire
- Population: 318 (2011)
- OS grid reference: SK182359
- District: Derbyshire Dales
- Shire county: Derbyshire
- Region: East Midlands
- Country: England
- Sovereign state: United Kingdom
- Post town: ASHBOURNE
- Postcode district: DE6
- Police: Derbyshire
- Fire: Derbyshire
- Ambulance: East Midlands

Boylestone is a village and civil parish in the Derbyshire Dales district of Derbyshire, England. At the 2011 census, it had a population of 318. The village is eight miles east of Uttoxeter. The parish includes Boylestonfield.

The village church is 14th century with a tower added in 1844 by Henry Duesbury.

The cartoonist Bill Tidy lived in the village.

== History ==
Boylestone was mentioned in the Domesday Book as belonging to Henry de Ferrers and being worth thirty shillings.

== See also ==
- Listed buildings in Boylestone
