= Longford, Derbyshire =

Coordinates: 52.943°N 1.681°W

Longford
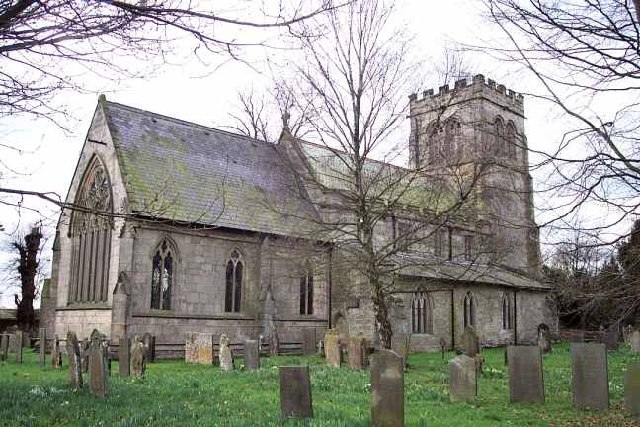
- St Chad's Church, Longford

- Location within Derbyshire
- Population: 349 (2011)
- Civil parish: Longford
- District: Derbyshire Dales
- Shire county: Derbyshire
- Region: East Midlands
- Country: England
- Sovereign state: United Kingdom
- Post town: Ashbourne
- Postcode district: DE6
- Police: Derbyshire
- Fire: Derbyshire
- Ambulance: East Midlands

Longford is a village and civil parish in Derbyshire Dales district, Derbyshire, England. The population of the civil parish as of the 2011 census was 349. It is 6 miles (10 km) from Ashbourne and 11 miles (18 km) west of Derby. The district of South Derbyshire borders the south and east of the parish.

== History ==
In 1872 the parish of Longford was described as having just over 1150 people and 220 dwellings. This parish took in the settlements of Alkmonton, Rodsley, Hollington and the "liberty" of Hungry Bentley. The first three were owned by the Coke family whilst the "liberty" of Hungry Bentley was in the possession of Lord Vernon.

== Amenities ==
The village is centred on Main Street (which becomes Longford Lane shortly thereafter) and has relatively few amenities. These consist mainly of Longford C of E Primary School (on Main Street) and The Ostrich Inn (on Long Lane), which is around 1/2 mile (800 m) from the nominal village centre.

There was a small campsite and playing field adjacent to, and under the control of, The Ostrich Inn. In early 2012, The Ostrich was taken over by new management. The pub closed for the last time in March 2020 and is now a private house.

== Notable residents ==
- George Coke (1570–1646), the Bishop of Bristol and of Hereford.
- William Budworth (1699–1745), a schoolmaster at Brewood, known for not employing Samuel Johnson as a teacher.
- Thomas Coke, 1st Earl of Leicester (1754–1842), politician and agricultural reformer; died locally.
- Thomas Garnier (1809–1863), lived locally 1840-1849, Dean of Lincoln, from 1860 to 1863.
- Rev. Thomas Anson (1818–1899), cricketer who played 44 First-class cricket matches, and local rector from 1850 to 1899.
- Thomas Garnier (1841–1898), cricketer who played 13 First-class cricket matches, and a clergyman.

== See also ==
- Listed buildings in Longford, Derbyshire
