= Catton, Derbyshire =

Civil parish in Derbyshire, England

Coordinates: 52.732°N 1.680°W

Catton
- Civil parish
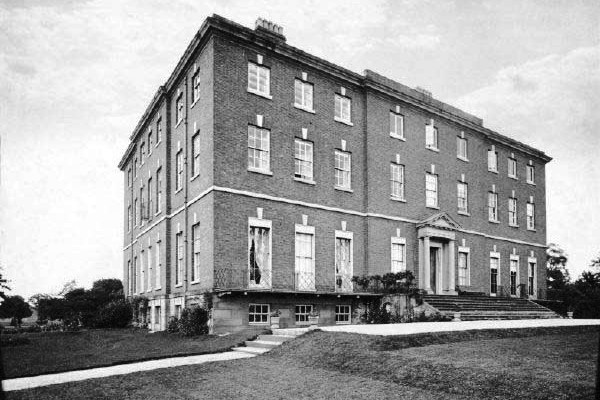
- Catton Hall

- Location within Derbyshire
- Map
- Area: 1.70 sq mi (4.4 km^{2})
- Population: 45 (2021)
  - Density: 26/sq mi (10/km^{2})
- OS grid reference: SK 216151
  - London: 100 mi (160 km) SE
- District: South Derbyshire
- Shire county: Derbyshire
- Region: East Midlands
- Country: England
- Sovereign state: United Kingdom
- Post town: SWADLINCOTE
- Postcode district: DE12
- Dialling code: 01283 / 01827
- Police: Derbyshire
- Fire: Derbyshire
- Ambulance: East Midlands
- UK Parliament: South Derbyshire

Catton is a civil parish within the South Derbyshire district, which is in the county of Derbyshire, England. Overwhelmingly rural, its population is reported as 45 residents in 2021. The parish is 100 miles (160 km) north west of London, 15 miles (24 km) south west of the county city of Derby, and 5 miles (8.0 km) south west of the nearest market town of Burton upon Trent. Being on the edge of the county border, it shares a boundary with the parishes of Coton in the Elms, Lullington and Walton upon Trent in Derbyshire, as well as Barton-under-Needwood, Edingale and Wychnor in Staffordshire. Catton Hall, a historic country house and the surrounding Catton Park are notable for hosting several annual events.

== Geography ==
=== Location ===
Catton parish is surrounded by the following local Derbyshire and Staffordshire places:

- Walton upon Trent to the north
- Croxall and Edingale, both in Staffordshire to the south
- Coton in the Elms to the east
- Alrewas, Staffordshire to the west.

It is 1.70 square miles (4.4 km^{2}; 440 ha) in area, 2 1/5 miles (3.5 km) in length and 2 miles (3.2 km) in width, within the deep south portion of the South Derbyshire district, and also is to the far south of the county. The parish is roughly bounded by land features such as the River Trent and Barton-under-Needwood quarry wetlands to the west, an unnamed minor road to the north, and Pessall brook to the south and east.

==== Settlements and routes ====
There are no substantial areas of built environment, the parish being essentially a rural location with dispersed settlements throughout. The most notable of buildings is at Catton Hall by the far west of the parish, close to the river. It is the largest residence as well as having a parish church in the vicinity. A handful of residential cottages and former lodges lie throughout the parish, along with a small number of farms. There are also very few medium-sized units used for some industry based in the centre of the parish alongside the farms. There are only two unnamed minor road routes through the parish, the road from Walton-on-Trent towards Croxall; and a spur from this is a lane to Coton and Rosliston.

=== Environment ===
==== Landscape ====
It is primarily farming and pasture land throughout the parish, there are however some small patches of forested areas, mainly at Catton Wood to the south west and Donkhill Wood and The Rough to the west. The parish is low-lying, bar some raised areas scattered throughout. The area alongside the river has several features known as the Ryelands. Catton is within The National Forest, which is an initiative to increase woodland across Derbyshire, Leicestershire and the eastern edge of Staffordshire.

==== Geology ====
Much of the parish is of the Gunthorpe (mudstone) bedrock formation between 247.1 and 237 million years ago and Edwalton (sandstone) members of sedimentary bedrock formed approximately 237 to 228 million years ago in the Triassic period. Along the banks of the River Trent, comprises superficial river terrace layers of sand and gravel which are sedimentary deposits formed between 2.588 million years ago and the present, and additional alluvium formations of clay and silt from 11.8 thousand years ago to the present. To the north east there are some Thrussington member (Diamicton) superficial sedimentary deposits formed between 480 and 423 thousand years ago, all types during the Quaternary period.

==== Water features ====
The parish, district and county western edge is formed by the River Trent. Pessall brook enters and exits the area along the south eastern perimeter. There are a few ponds, drains and wells throughout, as well as a 2-acre fishery pool by Donkhill Farm in the centre of the parish. Although not within, the Barton-under-Needwood quarry wetlands are a notable wildlife habitat adjacent to the western parish edge and river.

==== Land elevation ====
The parish on average is low lying, with the lowest points surrounding the River Trent to the west, from 49 metres (161 ft). The land rises along the south and east, with a peak towards the far north east, near the Catton Farm Cottages at 95 metres (312 ft),

== History ==
=== Toponymy ===
The name Catton possibly derived from an Anglo Saxon farmer C(e)atta but may also be named for the animal. It later became Chetun by the time it was recorded in the 1086 Domesday survey.

=== Parish and environment ===
The area, particularly to the west has unearthed a number of historic remains, prehistoric examples including flint scatter from 500000 BC close to the River Trent and from 40000 BC to 10001 BC a possible Upper Palaeolithic scraper/flake core northwest of Donkhill Plantation. There are several Middle or Late Neolithic period (4000 BC to 2351 BC) and Bronze Age (2350 BC to 701 BC) finds such as a stone axe within the Catton Hall grounds in 2014, along with Iron Age (800 BC to 409 BC) into Roman (43 AD to 410 AD) period pottery remnants also discovered. Presumed later dated features include possible post-conquest trackways, and evidence of medieval farming techniques such as ridge and furrow, and suggested field cropmarks. Later finds include post-medieval silver coins of various denominations, these showing little wear.

Land in Catton was granted to Wulfsige The Black (father of Wulfrun and grandfather of Wulfric Spot) by King Edmund I in 942. Catton was reported within the Domesday survey as a manor in 1066 at the time of the Norman invasion by William the Conqueror, by then held by Siward Barn, but by 1086 Henry de Ferrers had become the owner. It was in the hundred of Walecross and had a recorded population of 16 households. It is thought this was an indication of a nucleated village immediately north of the hall area which later became deserted at a later unknown date, there are records of tax receipts being paid by inhabitants from the manor in the 13th and 14th centuries. The area passed in marriage to the de Albini family and remained with them until the 13th century. The manor eventually came to the Almaric St Amand family, Roger Horton (died 1421) later became lord of the manor, purchasing property from them in around 1405.

The Hortons were from Cheshire originally, taking their name from Horton-by-Malpas. The family held Catton as their seat directly for several centuries and were notable, Walter Horton born in the 16th century becoming a Member of Parliament, and a later Walter Horton in the 17th century becoming High Sheriff of Derbyshire, although he lost this position in 1656 due to the family being supporters of Charles I during the English Civil War. Other members of the family also held the year long title, including Eusebius Horton who was the last direct male descendant. His daughter, Anne Beatrix, married Sir Robert John Wilmot, a later Member of Parliament who took on her surname after her father's death in 1823. It is thought there was a manor house from very early medieval times, which could have been redeveloped into a grander hall, little is known of either although there is a record of the contents in 1625. The hall was rebuilt by Christopher Horton in 1745.

It was recorded there was a church in the vicinity, dedicated originally to St Nicholas alone and granted by Nigel de Albini to the Prior of Tutbury in 1100. This was transferred in 1279 to Repton Priory. It had become derelict before the middle 17th century, and was rebuilt by Sir Christopher Horton around 1650, this being then dedicated also to the Virgin Mary. It was taken down in 1750 soon after Catton Hall was rebuilt, the church only again erected in 1892 with 120 sittings. It is thought the font dates from Norman times during the 12th century. Due to it being a private chapel, no registers were required to be kept. Catton was a township within the parish of Croxall and it was served by vicars from there. In 1866 it became a separate civil parish, and in 1894 Croxall was removed to Staffordshire.

Robert Wilmot-Horton worked for many years in the Colonial Office, and was also governor of Ceylon for a time, he acceded to the Wilmot of Osmaston baronetcy after his father. Anne-Beatrix continued to live at Catton for some 30 years after her husband's death, and after her death in 1871, Catton was held by her sons and afterwards by her granddaughter, Augusta Theresa, who married the Reverend Arthur Henry Anson who built the present Catton chapel. Their son, Henry Anson-Horton, inherited Catton at the end of the 19th century. returning from serving in the Colonial Office in Fiji, and lived at Catton until 1925 when his son George inherited the estate until 1957. Having no direct inheritors, in 1956 due to ill heath, he sent for his nephew, David Neilson, who returned with his family from New Zealand to take on the estate, with it remaining in that branch of the family to the present day.

The current boundary of the parish in the north Ryeland area once was not the boundary of the county, due to the course of the River Trent being further out west along a paleo-channel, taking in the Borough Holme island west of the Catton Ryelands which was in Walton-on-Trent parish until 1991 when the county perimeter was redrawn to follow the modern river course. Similarly further south, Cherry Holme was adjacent to Catton Hall and was within Catton, with a paleo-channel to the west which was the original county and parish boundary and was abandoned between 1955 and 1964. A boat house on the riverbank facilitated access historically. The boundary at this location was also redrawn in 1991 to follow the present course of the river which is further east. Further west, although in Wychnor parish in Staffordshire, the floodplain is known as Cat Holme, which has developed into the large scale Hanson's sand and gravel quarry which opened in 1972.

The Neilsons ran up debts into the 1980s as the income from agriculture was not maintaining the estate. Events such as NSPCC galas were run during the 1990s, but once Robin Neilson inherited it in the late 90s, there was a focus on running regular social gatherings to clear these, leading to several annual festivals being held. The Bloodstock Open Air Festival began there in 2005, in 2009 the second stage at Catton Park was named in Sophie Lancaster's memory, she was murdered after being attacked by a gang of youths in Bacup, Lancashire because of her goth subculture leanings. A hoard of medieval coins were unearthed by metal detector enthusiasts in Catton during 2003. In 2018, relics were taken during a burglary at the St Nicholas and Virgin Mary chapel. Amongst the items removed were candlestick holders, collection plate, vases and lectern.

== Governance and demography ==
=== Population ===
There are 45 residents recorded in total within the parish for the 2021 census,

=== Local bodies ===
Catton parish is managed at the first level of public administration through parish meetings.

At district level, the wider area is overseen by South Derbyshire district council. Derbyshire County Council provides the highest level strategic services locally.

== Economy ==
=== Historic ===
Although highly rural which encouraged much land use historically for agriculture and pastoral farming, other local industry included some quarrying, with small scale former marl pits in the north close to the Catton Farm cottages and the minor road junction. A gravel pit was in use alongside the River Trent in the very north Ryelands area, the wider area to the west also involved in mining. There is a field named Brick Kiln Pit to the south of the parish, close to Catton Park, although there are no above ground remains. As for labour in the late 1800s, reported hired help on hand at Catton Hall included servants, gardeners and gamekeepers. Also reported as a local occupation were Arnold & Whittingham auctioneers, based in both Catton and Coton in the Elms.

=== Present ===
There are several business types throughout the area mainly based at the farm areas and reusing agricultural buildings and storage facilities, including textile manufacturing, vehicle services, fishery, metal manufacture and engineering solutions, animal care and furniture design and suppliers. Catton Hall estate is also involved in the local economy, developing leisure and recreational commercial activities including a range of sports, with the grounds and Catton Park hosting large public events and caravan rallies. The Hall is also accessible on a limited basis by corporate and private groups, and occasionally offering accommodation.

== Community and leisure ==
=== Amenities ===
The parish has few publicly accessible facilities although there are some specific commercial business activities. Shopping for some basic everyday items generally requires travelling to nearby villages such as Walton-on-Trent or Alrewas, or larger towns such as Burton-upon-Trent, Lichfield or Swadlincote.

=== Recreation ===
Catton Park surrounds the hall. But few public accessible paths exist throughout the wider area.

There is a fishing pool within the centre of the parish.

There is a former microlight aircraft grass airfield to the south east of the parish which is now only used for large model aircraft.

=== Events ===
Catton Hall holds regular tours of the house and surrounding gardens during spring and summer.

Catton Park hosts several annual festivals and social gatherings:

- Back 2 Festival
- Bearded Theory
- Bloodstock Open Air
- Catton Park Horse Trials
- Derbyshire Sausage and Cider Festival
- Festival of Fireworks
- Trail endurance races
- Classic motor shows

== Landmarks ==
=== Conservation ===
==== Listed buildings ====
There are five items of architectural merit throughout the parish with statutory listed status.

Catton Hall has a higher designation of Grade II*, the rest are buildings associated to Catton Hall and are at Grade II, including the 19th century built church.

==== Environment ====
The parish is wholly contained within the National Forest in England, which is a programme to restore an ancient forested area between Staffordshire, Derbyshire and Leicestershire with woodland. There is a specific scheme to Catton Hall and park, in which several hectares have been planted.

=== War memorials ===
A monument for Catton locals is at St Laurence's Church, Walton on Trent, commemorating personnel who served in the World War I and WWII conflicts.

== Religious sites ==
The chapel of Saint Nicholas and the Virgin Mary is an Anglican associated place of worship that was built by the Catton estate in 1892. It is based within the grounds of the hall and continues to be owned by the family.

== Notable people ==
- Sir Robert Wilmot-Horton (1784–1841), Member of Parliament and owner of Catton Hall
- Walter Horton (born ca. 1512-unknown), briefly Member of Parliament
