= South Derbyshire District Council elections =

Local government elections in Derbyshire, England

South Derbyshire District Council elections are held every four years. South Derbyshire District Council is the local authority for the non-metropolitan district of South Derbyshire in Derbyshire, England. Since the last boundary changes in 2011, 36 councillors have been elected from 15 wards.

== Council elections ==
- 1973 South Derbyshire District Council election
- 1976 South Derbyshire District Council election
- 1979 South Derbyshire District Council election (New ward boundaries)
- 1983 South Derbyshire District Council election
- 1987 South Derbyshire District Council election
- 1991 South Derbyshire District Council election (District boundary changes took place but the number of seats remained the same)
- 1995 South Derbyshire District Council election
- 1999 South Derbyshire District Council election
- 2003 South Derbyshire District Council election (New ward boundaries)
- 2007 South Derbyshire District Council election
- 2011 South Derbyshire District Council election (New ward boundaries)
- 2015 South Derbyshire District Council election
- 2019 South Derbyshire District Council election
- 2023 South Derbyshire District Council election

== Council composition ==
Year	Conservative	Labour	Liberal Democrats	Independent	Control
2003	15	21	0	0	Labour
2007	21	14	0	1	Conservative
2011	19	17	0	0	Conservative
2015	24	12	0	0	Conservative
2019	22	14	0	0	Conservative
2023	10	23	2	1	Labour

== Results maps ==
2003 results map

2007 results map

2011 results map

2015 results map

2019 results map

2023 results map

== By-election results ==
=== 1995-1999 ===
Hatton By-Election 17 July 1997
Party	Candidate	Votes	%	±%
Labour		318	67.9	+67.9
Conservative		151	32.2	+32.2
Majority		167	35.7	
Turnout		469	23.5	
Labour gain from Conservative		Swing		

Repton By-Election 17 July 1997
Party	Candidate	Votes	%	±%
Conservative		572	56.3	+19.5
Labour		444	43.7	+20.5
Majority		128	12.6	
Turnout		1,016	35.1	
Conservative hold		Swing		

Swadlincote By-Election 30 October 1997
Party	Candidate	Votes	%	±%
Labour		407	61.0	+15.5
Liberal Democrats		215	32.2	+32.2
Conservative		45	6.7	−2.0
Majority		192	28.8	
Turnout		667		
Labour hold		Swing		

Newhall By-Election 13 November 1997
Party	Candidate	Votes	%	±%
Labour		497	73.5	−8.6
Conservative		91	13.5	−4.4
Liberal Democrats		88	13.0	+13.0
Majority		406	60.0	
Turnout		676	13.8	
Labour hold		Swing		

Swadlincote By-Election 16 April 1998
Party	Candidate	Votes	%	±%
Labour		497	58.5	+13.0
Independent		289	34.0	+13.9
Conservative		64	7.5	−1.2
Majority		208	24.5	
Turnout		850	23.7	
Labour hold		Swing		

=== 1999-2003 ===
Newhall By-Election 7 June 2001
Party	Candidate	Votes	%	±%
Labour		2,047	71.8	+1.1
Conservative		803	28.2	−1.1
Majority		1,244	43.6	
Turnout		2,850		
Labour hold		Swing		

=== 2003-2007 ===
Hilton By-Election 17 February 2005
Party	Candidate	Votes	%	±%
Conservative	Margaret Littlejohn	499	59.3	−13.5
Labour		245	29.1	+1.9
Liberal Democrats	Derek Winter	97	11.5	+11.5
Majority		254	30.2	
Turnout		841	26.6	
Conservative hold		Swing		

Swadlincote By-Election 20 April 2006
Party	Candidate	Votes	%	±%
Labour	Neil Tilley	565	61.3	+10.4
Conservative	Jon McEwan	356	38.7	+11.9
Majority		209	22.6	
Turnout		921	17.2	
Labour hold		Swing		

Swadlincote By-Election 13 July 2006
Party	Candidate	Votes	%	±%
Labour	Joan Lane	562	51.4	+0.5
Liberal Democrats	Peter Morris	301	27.5	+27.5
Conservative	Jon-Paul McEwan	231	21.1	−5.7
Majority		331	23.9	
Turnout		1,094	20.3	
Labour hold		Swing		

=== 2007-2011 ===
Church Gresley By-Election 18 October 2007
Party	Candidate	Votes	%	±%
Labour	Gordon Rhind	639	43.8	−23.0
BNP	Richard Fallows	516	35.4	+35.4
Conservative	Jana Eaton	304	20.8	−12.4
Majority		123	8.4	
Turnout		1,459		
Labour hold		Swing		

=== 2015-2019 ===
Linton By-Election 25 October 2018
Party	Candidate	Votes	%	±%
Conservative	Raymond Tipping	613	46.3	+13.3
Labour	Malc Gee	510	38.5	+5.8
UKIP	Mike Dawson	118	8.9	−17.8
Liberal Democrats	Rebecca Wilkinson	82	6.2	−1.5
Majority		103	7.8	
Turnout		1,323		
Conservative hold		Swing		

Linton By-Election 25 October 2018
Party	Candidate	Votes	%	±%
Conservative	Dan Pegg	623	62.5	23.8
Labour	Ben Stuart	316	32.7	2.8
Liberal Democrats	Lorraine Karen Johnson	48	4.8	0.7
Majority		307	29.8	
Turnout		988	22.53	
Conservative hold		Swing		

=== 2019-2023 ===
Church Gresley By-Election 6 May 2021
Party	Candidate	Votes	%	±%
Conservative	Roger Redfern	994	61.4	+25.0
Labour	Sue Taylor	625	38.6	−0.1
Majority		369	22.8	
Turnout		1,619		
Conservative hold		Swing		

Hilton By-Election 6 May 2021
Party	Candidate	Votes	%	±%
Conservative	Gillian Lemmon	1,364		
Conservative	Peter Smith	1,097		
Liberal Democrats	Grahame Andrew	467		
Labour	David Peacock	457		
Labour	Maureen Timmins	428		
Reform	Alan Graves	105		
Conservative hold		Swing		
Conservative hold		Swing		

Seales By-Election 6 May 2021
Party	Candidate	Votes	%	±%
Conservative	Simon Ackroyd	1,070	67.0	+16.4
Labour	Steven Frost	527	33.0	+2.7
Majority		543	34.0	
Turnout		1,597		
Conservative hold		Swing		

Seales By-Election 9 September 2021
Party	Candidate	Votes	%	±%
Independent	Amy Wheelton	399	39.7	+39.7
Conservative	Stuart Swann	390	38.8	−11.8
Labour	Louise Mulgrew	188	18.7	−11.6
Green	Amanda Baker	27	2.7	+2.7
Majority		9	0.9	
Turnout		1,004		
Independent gain from Conservative		Swing		

Midway By-Election 30 June 2022
Party	Candidate	Votes	%	±%
Labour	Louise Mulgrew	600	52.6	+14.7
Conservative	Barry Appleby	540	47.4	+9.2
Majority		60	5.3	
Turnout		1,140		
Labour gain from Conservative		Swing		

=== 2023-2027 ===
Melbourne By-Election 2 May 2024
Party	Candidate	Votes	%	±%
Conservative	Matthew Gotheridge	928	45.4	
Labour	Jackie Lane	681	33.3	
Liberal Democrats	John James	219	10.7	
Green	Jonathan Wood	135	6.6	
Reform	Liam Booth-Isherwood	82	4.0	
Majority		247	12.1	
Turnout		2,045		
Conservative hold		Swing		

Hatton By-Election 4 July 2024
Party	Candidate	Votes	%	±%
Conservative	Julie Patten	527	43.4	−6.5
Labour	Jackie Lane	415	34.2	−15.9
Liberal Democrats	Tilo Scheel	271	22.3	+22.3
Majority		112	9.2	
Turnout		1,213		
Conservative gain from Labour		Swing		

Seales By-Election 6 November 2025
Party	Candidate	Votes	%	±%
Independent	Graham Wood	713	55.7	
Reform	Ian Baker	309	24.1	
Conservative	David Bell	105	8.2	
Labour	Marie Haywood	82	6.4	
Liberal Democrats	Benjamin Hayes	72	5.6	
Majority		404	31.5	
Turnout		1,281		
Independent gain from Labour		Swing		
