= Botany Bay, Derbyshire =

Botany Bay
- Hamlet
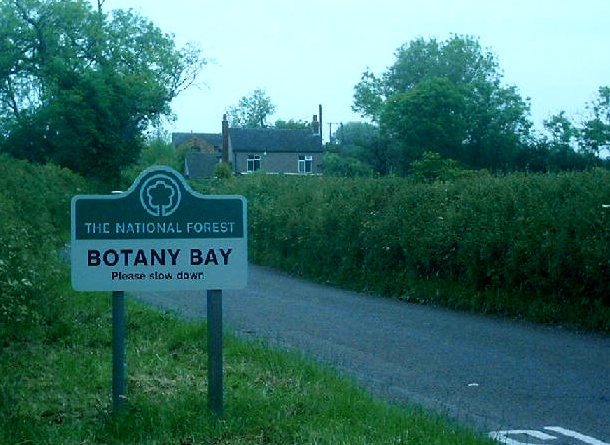
- "The small hamlet"
- Interactive map of Botany Bay
- Coordinates: 52.73562°N 1.61786°W
- Grid reference: SK259154
- Country: England
- County: Derbyshire
- Civil parish: Rosliston

Botany Bay is a small hamlet in south Derbyshire near Linton and Coton in the Elms in the National Forest (grid reference SK259154). The appropriate civil parish is Rosliston.

== Toponymy ==
Unlike the nearby town of Melbourne, Botany Bay does not appear to have a common source with its better known Australian namesake. While Botany Bay in New South Wales was named for the quantity of botanical specimens found there, the history of the naming of the Derbyshire hamlet is unclear. The name is also attached to a farm and a small lake in the area.

== Landlocked ==
Despite the maritime reference in the hamlet's name, the Ordnance Survey have calculated that a point near Botany Bay, at Coton in the Elms, is the furthest point from the English coastline. The low water line at Fosdyke, on the edge of The Wash in Lincolnshire, is around 70 miles (110 kilometres) away.

== Woodland ==
Penguin Books together with the Woodland Trust purchased a 96-acre (390,000 m^{2}) woodland near the hamlet in January 2007. The initiative was designed to expand the nearby National Forest and regenerate the historical wildflower and woodland environment in the area.
