= Listed buildings in Catton, Derbyshire =

Catton is a civil parish in the South Derbyshire district of Derbyshire, England. The parish contains five listed buildings that are recorded in the National Heritage List for England. Of these, one is listed at Grade II*, the middle of the three grades, and the others are at Grade II, the lowest grade. The most important building in the parish is Catton Hall, which is listed at Grade II*. All the other listed buildings are associated with the hall, and consist of the kitchen garden walls, two stable ranges and a chapel.

== Key ==
Grade	Criteria
II*	Particularly important buildings of more than special interest
II	Buildings of national importance and special interest

== Buildings ==
Name and location	Photograph	Date	Notes	Grade
Catton Hall; 52.73543°N 1.69618°W		1741	A country house, to which a wing was added in 1907. It is in red brick on a stone basement, with dressings in brick and stone, a floor band, a moulded stone cornice and blocking course, and a hipped slate roof. There are three storeys and a basement, a double depth plan, and fronts of nine and seven bays on the main block. On the garden front, the middle three bays project with steps in front, and contain a doorway with Doric columns, a triglyph frieze, and a dentilled pediment. The ground and middle floors contain sash windows, in the top floor the windows are casements, and all windows have keystones.	II*
Kitchen garden walls, Catton Hall; 52.73489°N 1.69324°W	—	Late 18th century	The walls that enclose the rectangular kitchen garden are in red brick with stone copings. They are about 12 feet (3.7 m) high, and on their outer sides are pilasters. Each wall contains segmental-arched doorways.	II
North stable range and gate pier, Catton Hall; 52.73539°N 1.69523°W	—	Early 19th century	The stable range, later used for other purposes, is in red brick with a floor band and a tile roof. There is a single storey and a loft, and six bays, the west bay projecting. In the ground floor are segmental-headed arches, and semicircular-arched doorways with fanlights, and above are semicircular windows with casements. On the centre of the roof is an octagonal cupola with a clock face, open sides, a domed roof and a weathervane. Attached to the southeast corner is a brick wall ending in a panelled gate pier.	II
South stable range and archway, Catton Hall; 52.73525°N 1.69535°W	—	Early 19th century	The stable range, later used for other purposes, is in red brick with a floor band and a tile roof. There is a single storey and a loft, and six bays, the west bay projecting. In the ground floor are semicircular-arched doorways, some with fanlights, and above are semicircular windows with casements. Attached to the west end is an archway of 1907 with a pediment.	II
Chapel of Ease, Catton Hall; 52.73577°N 1.69544°W	—	1892	The chapel is in red brick with a slate roof. It consists of a nave, a south porch, a chancel with a canted end, and a north vestry. On the west gable is an octagonal timber bellcote with open sides and a shingled spire, and the windows are lancets.	II
