= 2019 South Derbyshire District Council election =

2019 UK local government election

← 2015	2 May 2019	2023 →

All 36 seats to South Derbyshire District Council 19 seats needed for a majority

	First party	Second party
Party	Conservative	Labour
Last election	24 seats, 44.7%	12 seats, 31.3%
Seats won	22	14
Seat change	▼2	▲2
Popular vote	27,414	19,935
Percentage	53.4%	38.8%
Swing	▲8.7%	▲7.6%
Council control before election
Conservative
Council control after election
Conservative

The 2019 South Derbyshire District Council election took place on 2 May 2019 to elect members of South Derbyshire District Council in England. This was the same day as other local elections.

== Results summary ==
2019 South Derbyshire District Council election
Party	Candidates	Seats	Gains	Losses	Net gain/loss	Seats %	Votes %	Votes	+/−
Conservative	36	22	1	3	▼2	61.1	53.4	27,414	+8.7
Labour	36	14	3	1	▲2	38.9	38.8	19,935	+7.6
UKIP	10	0	0	0	Steady	0.0	7.2	3,719	–13.9
SDP	1	0	0	0	Steady	0.0	0.5	251	N/A

== Ward results ==
=== Aston ===
Aston
Party	Candidate	Votes	%	±%
Conservative	Neil Atkin	1,219	52.7	
Conservative	Peter Watson	1,170	50.6	
Conservative	Daniel Corbin	1,005	43.5	
Labour	Lindsey Riley	811	35.1	
Labour	Iain Wilson	722	31.2	
Labour	Peter Bonnell	602	26.0	
UKIP	Alan Graves	555	24.0	
Turnout		2,313	36.1	
Conservative hold				
Conservative hold				
Conservative hold				

=== Church Gresley ===
Church Gresley
Party	Candidate	Votes	%	±%
Labour	Gordon Rhind	615	39.5	
Labour	Trevor Southerd	598	38.4	
Conservative	Jane Perry	578	37.1	
Conservative	Aden Hallam	573	36.8	
Conservative	Stuart Swann	571	36.7	
Labour	Sue Taylor	554	35.6	
UKIP	James Nichols	396	25.4	
Turnout		1,557	23.9	
Labour hold				
Labour hold				
Conservative hold				

=== Etwall ===
Etwall
Party	Candidate	Votes	%	±%
Conservative	Lisa Brown	1,345	76.2	
Conservative	David Muller	1,180	66.9	
Labour	John McCallum	394	22.3	
Labour	Maureen Timmins	344	19.5	
Turnout		1,764	38.3	
Conservative hold				
Conservative hold				

=== Hatton ===
Hatton
Party	Candidate	Votes	%	±%
Conservative	Andy Roberts	323	51.2	
Labour	Julie Jackson	196	31.1	
UKIP	Steven Murphy	112	17.7	
Turnout		631	31.0	
Conservative hold		Swing		

=== Hilton ===
Hilton
Party	Candidate	Votes	%	±%
Conservative	Julie Patten	1,186	55.8	
Conservative	Andy Billings	1,078	50.7	
Conservative	Jason Whittenham	942	44.3	
Labour	Steve Cooper	604	28.4	
Labour	David Peacock	536	25.2	
Labour	David Dickinson	522	24.6	
UKIP	Neil Gaffney	384	18.1	
Turnout		2,126	29.7	
Conservative hold				
Conservative hold				
Conservative hold				

=== Linton ===
Linton
Party	Candidate	Votes	%	±%
Conservative	Dan Pegg	681	49.5	
Conservative	Melanie Bridgen	571		
Labour	Ben Stuart	387	28.1	
UKIP	Barry Appleby	308	22.4	
Labour	Dan Neale	291		
Turnout				
Conservative hold				
Conservative hold				

=== Melbourne ===
Melbourne
Party	Candidate	Votes	%	±%
Conservative	Jim Hewlett	1,008	62.0	
Conservative	Martin Fitzpatrick	866	53.3	
Labour	Jane Carroll	714	43.9	
Labour	Andrew Clifton	454	27.9	
Turnout		1,625	37.4	
Conservative hold				
Conservative hold				

=== Midway ===
Midway
Party	Candidate	Votes	%	±%
Conservative	David Angliss	690	38.2	
Labour	Paul Dunn	683	37.9	
Labour	Robert Pearson	670		
Labour	Kalila Storey	614		
Conservative	Richard Hallberg	602		
Conservative	Gary Musson	572		
UKIP	Jonathan Palmer	431	23.9	
Turnout				
Conservative gain from Labour				
Labour hold				
Labour hold				

=== Newhall and Stanton ===
Newhall and Stanton
Party	Candidate	Votes	%	±%
Labour	Sean Bambrick	755	47.4	
Labour	Linda Stuart	677	42.5	
Labour	Kevin Richards	665	41.7	
Conservative	Barry Woods	630	39.5	
Conservative	George Marshall	586	36.8	
Conservative	David Lewis	558	35.0	
UKIP	Alan Greaves	434	27.2	
Turnout		1,594	25.4	
Labour hold				
Labour hold				
Labour hold				

=== Repton ===
Repton
Party	Candidate	Votes	%	±%
Conservative	Andrew Churchill	1,125	71.6	
Conservative	Kerry Haines	1,092	69.5	
Labour	Jo Taylor	380	24.2	
Labour	David Oliver	334	21.2	
Turnout		1,572	36.9	
Conservative hold				
Conservative hold				

=== Seales ===
Seales
Party	Candidate	Votes	%	±%
Conservative	Amy Wheelton	667	48.8	
Conservative	Andrew Brady	657	48.0	
Labour	Steve Frost	400	29.2	
Labour	Toni-Ann Rogers	303	22.1	
SDP	Sue Ward	251	18.3	
Turnout		1,368	32.1	
Conservative hold				
Conservative hold				

=== Stenson ===
Stenson
Party	Candidate	Votes	%	±%
Labour	David Shepherd	747	59.2	
Labour	Lakhvinder Singh	673		
Conservative	Tarlochan Dard	514	40.8	
Conservative	Adele Pabla	415		
Turnout				
Labour hold				
Labour hold				

=== Swadlincote ===
Swadlincote
Party	Candidate	Votes	%	±%
Labour	Neil Tilley	628	40.2	
Labour	Vonnie Heath	587	37.5	
Labour	Mick Mulgrew	544	34.8	
Conservative	Sandra Wyatt	535	34.2	
Conservative	Lorraine Walker	503	32.2	
Conservative	Lewis Frisby	460	29.4	
UKIP	Martin Batteson	455	29.1	
Turnout		1,564	24.8	
Labour hold				
Labour gain from Conservative				
Labour gain from Conservative				

=== Willington and Findern ===
Willington and Findern
Party	Candidate	Votes	%	±%
Conservative	Martyn Ford	985	55.2	
Conservative	Andrew MacPherson	827	46.4	
Labour	Ian Hudson	556	31.2	
Labour	Carol Large	539	30.2	
UKIP	Michael Gee	302	16.9	
Turnout		1,784	37.4	
Conservative hold				
Conservative hold				

=== Woodville ===
Woodville
Party	Candidate	Votes	%	±%
Labour	Steve Taylor	645	41.7	
Labour	Malc Gee	621	40.1	
Conservative	Michael Dawson	601	38.8	
Labour	Jade Taft	570	36.8	
Conservative	Eric Parker	554	35.8	
Conservative	Maureen Mycock	546	35.3	
UKIP	Ann Graves	342	22.1	
Turnout		1,548	22.7	
Labour hold				
Labour gain from Conservative				
Conservative hold				

== By-elections ==
=== Seale ===
Seale: 9 September 2021
Party	Candidate	Votes	%	±%
Independent	Amy Wheelton	399	39.7	N/A
Conservative	Stuart Swann	390	38.8	−11.8
Labour	Louise Mulgrew	188	18.7	−11.6
Green	Amanda Baker	27	2.7	N/A
Majority		9	0.9	
Turnout		1,004		
Independent gain from Conservative		Swing	▲25.8	
