= Listed buildings in Walton-on-Trent =

Walton-on-Trent is a civil parish in the South Derbyshire district of Derbyshire, England. The parish contains nine listed buildings that are recorded in the National Heritage List for England. Of these, two are listed at Grade II*, the middle of the three grades, and the others are at Grade II, the lowest grade. The parish contains the village of Walton-on-Trent and the surrounding area. The listed buildings consist of houses, cottages and associated structures, farmhouses and farm buildings, and a church and its lychgate.

== Key ==
Grade	Criteria
II*	Particularly important buildings of more than special interest
II	Buildings of national importance and special interest

== Buildings ==
Name and location	Photograph	Date	Notes	Grade
St Lawrence's Church; 52.76129°N 1.68152°W		12th century	The church has been altered and extended through the centuries, including a Victorian restoration by G. E. Street in 1868. It is built in stone and has roofs of tile and slate. The church consists of a nave, a south aisle, a south transept, a chancel, a north vestry and a west tower. The tower is in Perpendicular style and has three stages, stepped angle buttresses, and a south stair turret with slit windows. There is a west window with a pointed arch and a hood mould, above which is a niche with an ogee head containing a statue, and with three shields below. In the middle stage are clock faces, and the top stage contains two-light pointed bell openings. Over these are a coved eaves string course with gargoyles, and embattled parapets.	II*
52–54 Main Street; 52.76021°N 1.68356°W	—	15th to 16th century	A hall and cross-wing house, later two houses, they are timber framed with brick nogging on a stone plinth, the exterior rendered and painted, and with a tile roof and two storeys. The cross-wing has an initialled plaque and initials spelt out in brick, inside the hall range are substantial remains of a cruck truss, and both parts contain internal timber framed partitions and inglenook fireplaces.	II
35 Main Street; 52.76000°N 1.68225°W	—	Early 17th century	A timber framed house with brick nogging on a stone plinth and a tile roof that was later extended to the west in red brick with painted timber framing. There is a single storey with an attic, the west two bays are timber framed, and the east bay is in brick. The west bays contain a three-light casement window, and in the east bay is a five-light mullioned window and an eyebrow dormer above. Inside, there is an inglenook fireplace.	II
Walton Hall, stable range and wall 52.75817°N 1.68355°W		1724–29	A small country house in red brick on a stone basement, with stone dressings, and stone parapets with moulded copings. There are three storeys, a basement on the northwest corner, and fronts of seven and five bays. On the main front are giant pilasters, a moulded sill band, and a moulded cornice with panelled parapets. In the centre is a doorway with pilasters, a triglyph frieze and a segmental pediment. The windows on the front are sashes, most with keystones. To the north are stable ranges with hipped tile roofs, two storeys, and an L-shaped plan with two ranges of seven bays, the openings with segmental heads. The garden wall is in red brick with stone copings and is about 10 feet (3.0 m) high.	II*
Barr Hall and farm buildings 52.76294°N 1.67659°W	—	Late 18th century	The farmhouse and attached farm buildings are in red brick. The farmhouse has a floor band, a dentilled eaves band, and slate roofs, hipped at the front and with coped gables at the rear. It is partly in three storeys and partly in two storeys with attics, and has a front of four bays. Steps lead up to a central doorway with Roman Doric columns, an entablature and a traceried fanlight. The windows on the front are sashes, and at the rear are casement windows with segmental or flat heads. Inside the farmhouse are inglenook fireplaces. The farm buildings have two storeys, with a higher archway at the end, and a barn and cowsheds at right angles.	II
Barn Farm Cottage and barn 52.75939°N 1.68460°W		Late 18th century	The cottage and attached threshing barn are in red brick, with tile roofs and coped gables to the barn. There are two storeys, the barn has five bays, and the cottage has one, with one bay of the barn incorporated into the cottage. The cottage has a doorway with a segmental head and a gabled bracketed porch. The windows are casements, the ground floor window with a segmental head. The barn has various openings, and in the south wall is a hoist.	II
The Round Lodge; 52.74042°N 1.69012°W		Early 19th century	A lodge, later a private house, it is in red brick with an octagonal hipped tile roof. There are two storeys and an octagonal plan. In the ground floor are doorways, some blocked, and casement windows, all with pointed heads. The upper floor windows have flat heads.	II
Outbuilding and garden wall, Walton Hall; 52.75829°N 1.68246°W	—	Early 19th century	The outbuilding is in red brick with a stepped eaves band and a tile roof. There is one storey and attics, and two bays. The building contains doorways and windows with segmental heads, and a dormer with a hipped roof. The attached garden wall is in red brick with copings in flat stone or chamfered brick, and is about 10 feet (3.0 m) high.	II
Lychgate, St Lawrence's Church; 52.76097°N 1.68122°W		c. 1899	The lychgate at the entrance to the churchyard has side walls in red brick with chamfered stone copings, and between them are double wooden gates. The superstructure is in timber, and has a tile roof with carved pierced bargeboards. On the east tie beam is an inscription.	II
