= Listed buildings in Coton in the Elms =

Coton in the Elms is a civil parish in the South Derbyshire district of Derbyshire, England. The parish contains three listed buildings that are recorded in the National Heritage List for England. All the listed buildings are designated at Grade II, the lowest of the three grades, which is applied to "buildings of national importance and special interest". The parish contains the village of Coton in the Elms and the surrounding area, and the listed buildings consist of a house, a farmhouse, and a church.

== Buildings ==
| Name and location | Photograph | Date | Notes |
|---|---|---|---|
| The Old School House; 52.73256°N 1.63810°W | — | 16th or 17th century | The house has a timber framed core and is encased in red brick, with overhanging eaves and a tile roof. There are two storeys and two bays. On the front is a gabled porch, and casement windows, those in the ground floor with hood moulds. On the gable ends is applied timber framing, and at the rear is exposed timber framing. |
| Manor Farmhouse; 52.73263°N 1.63850°W | — | Early 18th century | The farmhouse, which was extended to the rear in the early 19th century, is in red brick with a floor band, a dentilled eaves band, and a roof in blue and red tile with moulded gable copings and moulded kneelers. There are two storeys and attics, a front of three bays, and a rear extension. The central doorway has a fanlight and a bracketed timber hood. The windows on the front are sashes with flat heads, and in the attic and rear wing they are casements with segmental heads. |
| St Mary's Church; 52.73581°N 1.64062°W | | 1844–46 | The church was designed by H. I. Stevens in Decorated style. It is built in stone with a tile roof, and consists of a nave, a chancel with a north organ bay, and a west steeple. The steeple has a tower with three stages, stepped diagonal buttresses, a polygonal southeast stair turret, and a west doorway with a pointed arch, over which is a two-light window, a clock face, an embattled parapet, and a recessed octagonal spire with gableted lucarnes. |
