= Listed buildings in Linton, Derbyshire =

Linton is a civil parish in the South Derbyshire district of Derbyshire, England. The parish contains three listed buildings that are recorded in the National Heritage List for England. All the listed buildings are designated at Grade II, the lowest of the three grades, which is applied to "buildings of national importance and special interest". The parish contains the village of Linton and the surrounding countryside, and the listed buildings consist of a house, a farmhouse, and a cottage orné.

== Buildings ==
Name and location–49	Photograph	Date	Notes
Manor House; 52.74893°N 1.59461°W	—	17th century (probable)	The house, which was extensively remodelled in the 19th century, is in rendered brick, and has a tile roof with decorative bargeboards. There are two storeys, and an L-shaped plan, with an east range of four bays, and a rear wing. On the front is a flat-roofed porch, and a doorway with a rectangular fanlight and a swept roof. Most of the windows are cross windows, some with hood moulds.
Sealwood Cottage; 52.73803°N 1.58414°W	—	c. 1774	A cottage orné which was extended in the 19th century, and restored in 2008–09. It is in red brick and has applied timber framing with brick infill, and pyramidal roofs that were originally thatched. The original part has two storeys and single-storey wings, and the rear addition has two storeys. The original Gothic windows have been replaced by later windows, mainly casements. Inside, there are Gothic-style doorways and an inglenook fireplace.
Grange Farmhouse; 52.75065°N 1.59721°W	—	Late 18th century	The farmhouse, which was later extended, is in red brick, with a floor band, a dentilled eaves cornice, and a tile roof with coped gables and plain kneelers. There are two storeys and attics, a south range of four bays, and a later parallel rear range. Most of the windows have segmental heads, and in the attic is a row of blocked vents and three small single-light windows. Inside, there is an inglenook fireplace.
