= Linton, Derbyshire =

Civil parish in Derbyshire, England

Coordinates: 52.748°N 1.598°W

Linton
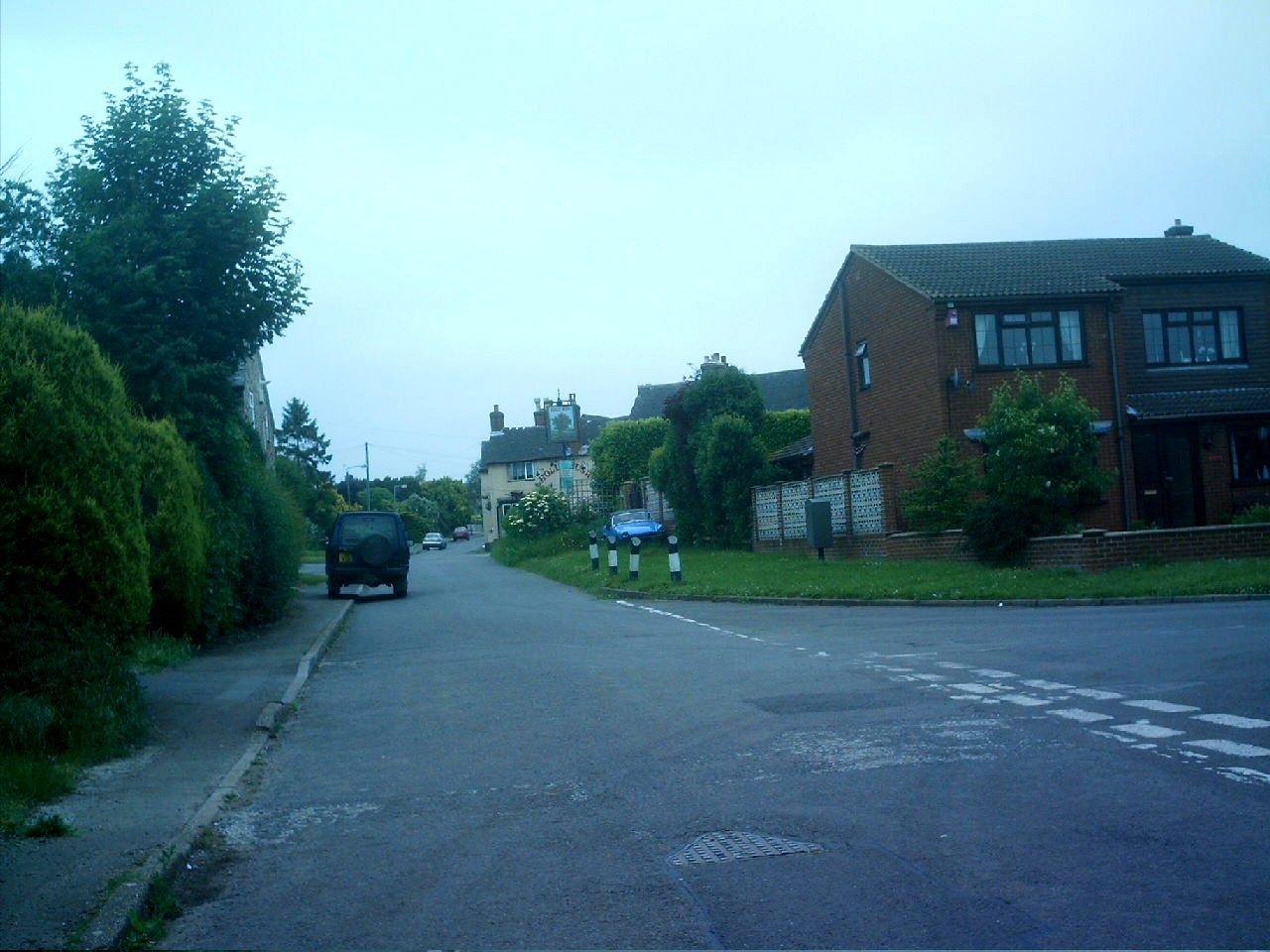
- The now closed Holly Bush pub on High Street, Linton

- Location within Derbyshire
- Population: 2,303 (2011)
- OS grid reference: SK272167
- District: South Derbyshire
- Shire county: Derbyshire
- Region: East Midlands
- Country: England
- Sovereign state: United Kingdom
- Post town: SWADLINCOTE
- Postcode district: DE12
- Police: Derbyshire
- Fire: Derbyshire
- Ambulance: East Midlands

Linton is a settlement and civil parish in South Derbyshire, England, 5 miles south east of Burton-on-Trent. The population of the civil parish taken at the 2011 Census was 2,303.

Nearby settlements are the town of Swadlincote and the villages of Castle Gresley, Overseal, Rosliston, Cauldwell (pronounced "Cordal") and Botany Bay. Many former fields to the south of the village are now wooded areas, forming part of the National Forest.

Linton village consists of a primary school, a convenience store with a post office (closed May 2024), one pub, two churches, a village hall, a community room called The Brick Room and Rickman's Corner Community Hall. The Brick Room belongs to Linton Church; it may have been a schoolroom years ago. The highlight of the year used to be the Sale of Work (a craft fair) held in late November of early December, and the Harvest Supper.

The bus services locally to Swadlincote and Burton upon Trent are provided by Arriva Midlands and Diamond East Midlands. Linton Primary School is on Main Street towards Linton Heath.

== History ==
Linton is mentioned briefly in the Domesday Book. The book says under the title of "The lands of Henry de Ferrers":

"In Linton Leofric had two carucates of land to the geld. There is land for 12 oxen. It is waste. Scrubland one furlong long and a half broad. TRE it was worth 20 shillings.“

== See also ==
- Listed buildings in Linton, Derbyshire
