= Listed buildings in Lullington, Derbyshire =

Lullington is a civil parish in the South Derbyshire district of Derbyshire, England. The parish contains six listed buildings that are recorded in the National Heritage List for England. Of these, one is listed at Grade II*, the middle of the three grades, and the others are at Grade II, the lowest grade. The parish contains the village of Lullington and the surrounding countryside, and the listed buildings consist of a church and associated structures, a village hall, and three farmhouses.

== Key ==
Grade	Criteria
II*	Particularly important buildings of more than special interest
II	Buildings of national importance and special interest

== Buildings ==
Name and location	Photograph	Date	Notes	Grade
All Saints' Church; 52.71359°N 1.63156°W		Late 14th century	The spire was largely rebuilt in 1776, and the church was restored and extended in 1861–62. The church is in stone with a tile roof, and consists of a nave, a south aisle, a south porch, a chancel with a north vestry, and a west steeple. The steeple has a tower with three stages, stepped buttresses with gablets, and a staircase projection to the southeast. In the bottom stage is a two-light west window, the middle stage contains lancet windows with trefoil heads, in the top stage are bell openings with Y-tracery, and above is a broach spire with two tiers of lucarnes.	II*
Bald Hill's Farmhouse; 52.70510°N 1.62921°W	—	Late 18th century	The farmhouse is in red brick, with dressings in gauged brick and stone, a dentilled eaves band, and a tile roof. There are three storeys, and an L-shaped plan, with a front range of three bays, and a lower rear wing. The doorway is arched and has a fanlight and a keystone. It is flanked by canted bay windows, and the other windows are sashes with flat brick arches and keystones.	II
Lady Leys Farmhouse; 52.71673°N 1.64998°W		Late 18th century	The farmhouse is in red brick, with dressings in gauged brick and stone, a stepped eaves band, and a tile roof. There are two storeys, an L-shaped plan, and a front range of three bays. In the centre is a doorway with a divided fanlight, the windows are casements, and all the openings have flat gauged brick arches with keystones. Inside the farmhouse are inglenook fireplaces.	II
Woodfields Farmhouse; 52.72305°N 1.61325°W	—	Late 18th century	The farmhouse is in red brick on a plinth, with dressings in gauged brick and stone, a dentilled eaves band, and a tile roof with overhanging eaves. There are three storeys and three bays. In the centre is a gabled timber porch, and a doorway with a fanlight. All the first and middle floor openings have flat gauged brick arches with painted stone keystones.	II
Village Hall; 52.71340°N 1.63088°W		1843	A school, later the village hall, it is in stone on a chamfered plinth, with a moulded sill band, corbels at eaves level, and a tile roof with moulded kneelers. There is a single storey, three bays, and a north porch, the middle bay projecting and gabled with moulded copings on moulded kneelers and a finial. Behind the gable is a gabled bellcote with a finial. In each bay is a mullioned window, and over the window in the middle bay is a carved achievement, a stepped hood mould, and a blind lancet. In the south gable wall is a mullioned and transomed window with a datestone above. The north gable end has a porch with a four-centred arched doorway.	II
Churchyard walls and gate, All Saints' Church; 52.71338°N 1.63159°W		c. 1860	The walls enclosing two sides of the churchyard are in stone with chamfered copings. In the centre of the southern wall is a gateway flanked by piers. These have plain chamfered bases, and gableted tops with recessed quatrefoils on the road side. Between the piers are wooden gates with iron finials, and over them is an ironwork arch with a lantern.	II
