= Walter Horton =

Walter Horton may refer to:

- Big Walter Horton (1921–1981), American blues harmonica player
- Walter Horton (landowner) (1512–?), English politician
- Walter H. Morton, locomotive engineer
- Walter S. Horton (1857–1944), American football player and lawyer
