= Listed buildings in Netherseal =

Netherseal is a civil parish in the South Derbyshire district of Derbyshire, England. The parish contains eleven listed buildings that are recorded in the National Heritage List for England. Of these, three are listed at Grade II*, the middle of the three grades, and the others are at Grade II, the lowest grade. The parish contains the village of Netherseal and the surrounding countryside. The listed buildings consist of a church and churchyard walls, a chapel, houses and associated structures, a pigeoncote, a former smithy, a row of almshouses, a farmhouse and a former watermill.

== Key ==
| Grade | Criteria |
|---|---|
| II* | Particularly important buildings of more than special interest |
| II | Buildings of national importance and special interest |

== Buildings ==
| Name and location | Photograph | Date | Notes | Grade |
|---|---|---|---|---|
| St Peter's Church; 52.71292°N 1.57405°W | | 13th century | The church has been altered and extended through the centuries, particularly in 1874–77 by Arthur Blomfield. It is built in stone with tile roofs, and consists of a nave, a north aisle, a north vestry, a south porch, a chancel, and a west tower. The tower has three stages, angle buttresses, a west window and clock face, two-light bell openings, an embattled parapet and a weathervane. | II* |
| Netherseal Old Hall, outbuildings and walls 52.71293°N 1.57226°W | | 1642 | The house has been extended a number of times. The part dating from the early 18th century is in stone on a chamfered plinth with a coved eaves cornice, and a tile roof with coped gables and moulded kneelers. The part from the late 18th century is in red brick on a blue brick plinth with brick and stone dressings, a dentilled eaves band, and a tile roof, hipped to the south. The 1908 wing is in red brick with blue brick headers on a blue brick plinth, with a stepped eaves band and a tile roof with moulded gable copings. The house has two storeys and attics, and an irregular plan. The doorway in the early part has a moulded chamfered surround, a moulded cornice and a pulvinated frieze. Most of the windows are cross windows, some are mullioned, and there are dormers with hipped roofs. Attached to the 1908 wing are outbuildings, including a garden pavilion, and red brick garden walls with vitrified headers and chamfered stone copings. | II* |
| Pigeoncote, Old Hall Cottages; 52.71227°N 1.57239°W | — | 1689 | The pigeoncote is in red brick with vitrified headers on a blue brick plinth, with an eaves band and a hipped tile roof. On the roof is a cupola with a moulded eaves cornice and a hipped conical metal roof. There is a single storey and an irregular hexagonal plan. The pigeoncote contains a doorway and a window, an initialled and dated terracotta panel, and stone panels with illegible inscriptions. | II* |
| Richard Johnson Almshouses; 52.71260°N 1.57475°W | — | 1699 | A row of six, later four, almshouses in red brick with stone dressings, a timber eaves band, and a tile roof with moulded gable copings and plain kneelers. There are two storeys and six bays. On the front is a passageway that has a doorway with a chamfered surround, above which is an inscribed stone panel. Elsewhere, are doorways and casement windows, some with segmental heads. | II |
| Mill Farmhouse; 52.71174°N 1.57136°W | — | Early 18th century | The farmhouse is in red brick with a floor band, a dentilled eaves band, and a steep tile roof, hipped to the east. There are two storeys and two bays. Both the north and the south fronts contain doorways with segmental heads and casement windows, most of those in the ground floor with segmental heads and in the upper floor with flat heads. Inside, there is a large inglenook fireplace. | II |
| Former smithy 52.71247°N 1.57240°W | — | Early 18th century | The smithy, later used for other purposes, is in red brick with vitrified headers, a raised eaves band, and a tile roof with stepped gable copings. There is a single storey and a single bay. In the south front is a doorway and a two-light casement window. | II |
| Churchyard and garden walls 52.71287°N 1.57492°W | — | Late 18th century | The walls on three sides of the churchyard are in stone with chamfered copings. On the east side is a gate with a simple metal overthrow, and on the west side are carved wooden gate piers, also with a simple metal overthrow. Attached to the west are red brick garden walls about 10 feet (3.0 m) high. | II |
| Mill at Mill Farm; 52.71144°N 1.57160°W | — | Late 18th century | A former watermill, which was extended in the 19th century, in red brick, with dentilled eaves bands and tile roofs. There are two storeys and two bays, and a lower later extension recessed to the north. The openings include doorways and casement windows, most with segmental heads, and a hatch. In the south gable end is a blocked opening that formerly housed the waterwheel. | II |
| Grangewood Hall and stable block 52.72561°N 1.58694°W | — | Early 19th century | The house is in stone on a plinth, the stable block is in painted red brick, both have floor bands, a moulded cornice, and a hipped slate roof, and two storeys. The house has three bays, the middle bay projecting with a tripartite window and a bracketed pediment, and the windows are sashes. In the angle between the wings is a porch with Tuscan half-columns, and a doorway with pilasters, a fanlight, and a cornice and blocking course. The stable block has eight bays, the middle two bays projecting under a pediment, and a segmental arch. | II |
| Lodge, Grangewood Hall; 52.72297°N 1.58327°W | — | Early 19th century | The lodge is in stone on a plinth, with an eaves band, and a hipped slate roof with blue ridge tiles. There is a single storey and a front of four bays, the right bay recessed, and a later extension to the right. On the front is a projecting porch with Tuscan columns and an entablature, and a doorway with pilasters, and the windows are sashes. | II |
| Baptist Chapel; 52.71497°N 1.57773°W | — | 1840 | The chapel is in red brick, the west wall rendered, with a dentilled eaves band, and a hipped tile roof. There are two storeys and four bays. In the centre is a segmental-headed doorway, and there are smaller doorways towards the sides. The windows have segmental heads and contain small panes with opening casements. In the middle of the upper floor is an inscribed and dated plaque. | II |
