= All Saints' Church, Lullington =

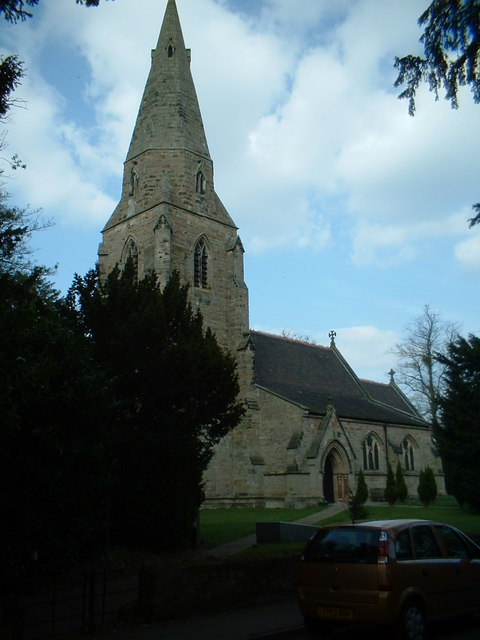
- All Saints' Church, Lullington
- All Saints' Church, Lullington
- 52°42′49.74″N 1°37′54.53″W
- Location: Lullington, Derbyshire
- Country: England
- Denomination: Church of England

History
- Dedication: All Saints

Architecture
- Heritage designation: Grade II* listed

Administration
- Province: Province of Canterbury
- Diocese: Diocese of Derby
- Archdeaconry: Derby
- Deanery: Repton
- Parish: Lullington

All Saints’ Church, Lullington is a Grade II* listed parish church in the Church of England in Lullington, Derbyshire.

== History ==
The church dates from the 14th century. The spire, nicknamed Lullington Spud, was rebuilt in 1776.

It was restored between 1861 and 1862 under the supervision of the architect John West Hugall and the contractor Elliott and Lilley. The main addition was a new south aisle. The gallery which blocked the tower was removed, and the tower arch opened up. The seating in the nave and choir stalls were renewed. The floor was laid with Minton tiles, with those in the sanctuary containing evangelistic symbols. A reredos was made from the alabaster slab which formed the old altar, and was inlaid with a centre cross of Rouge royal marble and Derbyshire Blue John, and four smaller Maltese crosses. The font was made of a bowl of Devonshire granite supported on five shafts of St Mary Church Torquay marble, raised on three steps of Mansfield stone. The restoration work cost £2,000 (equivalent to £210,254 in 2025) and the church reopened on 23 September 1862.

== Organ ==
The organ was built by Halmshaw and installed in 1862. A specification of the organ can be found on the National Pipe Organ Register.

== Parish status ==
The church is in a joint parish with

- St Mary's Church, Coton in the Elms
- St John the Baptist's Church, Croxall cum Oakley
- St Nicholas and the Blessed Virgin Mary's Church, Croxall cum Oakley
- St Mary's Church, Rosliston
- St Peter's Church, Netherseal
- St Lawrence's Church, Walton-on-Trent
- St Matthew's Church, Overseal

== See also ==
- Grade II* listed buildings in South Derbyshire
- Listed buildings in Lullington, Derbyshire
