= Coton in the Elms =

Village in Derbyshire, England

Coordinates: 52.727104°N 1.62608°W

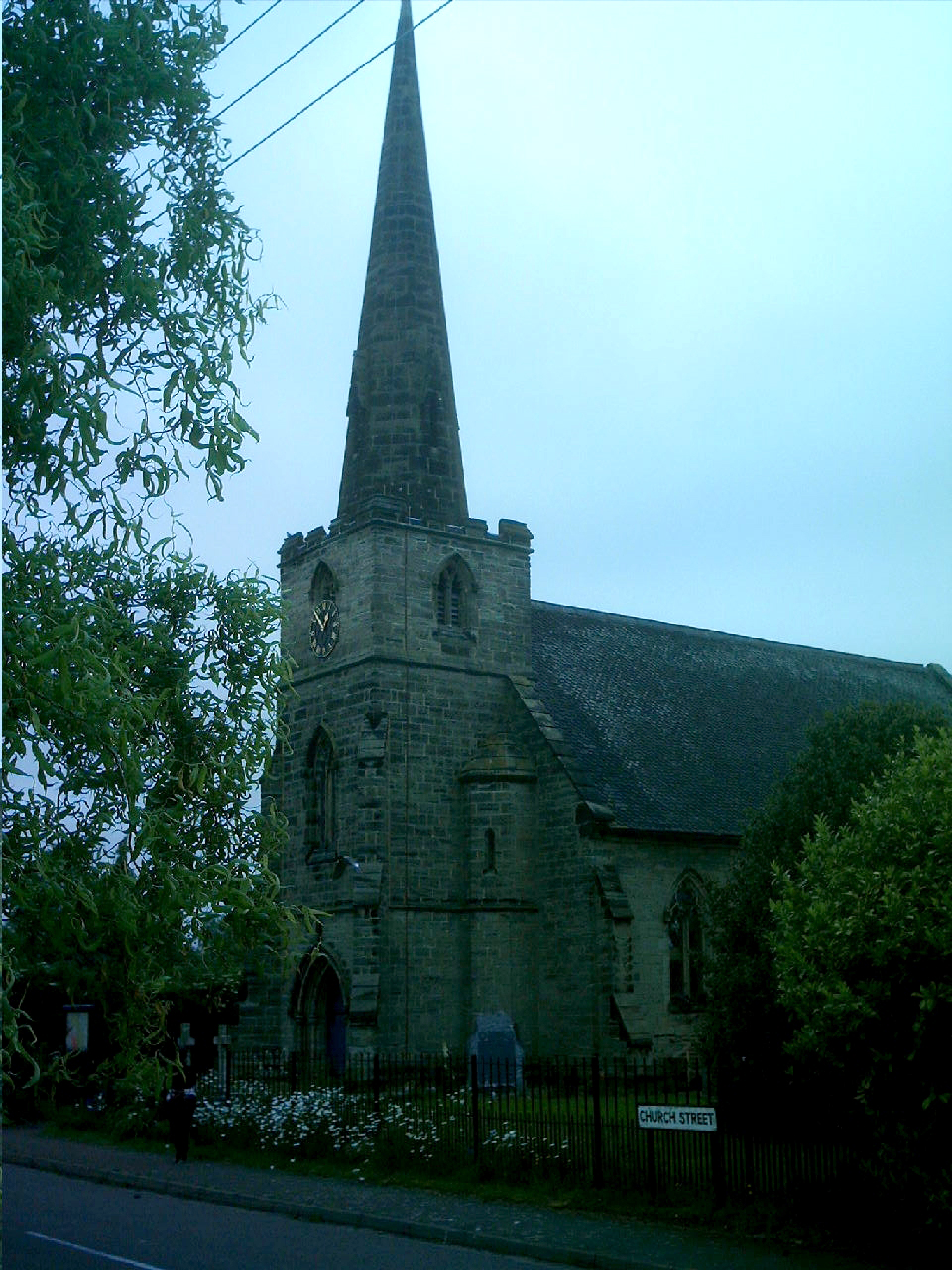
- St Mary Church, Coton in the Elms (Built 1844-1847).

- Location within Derbyshire
- Population: 896 (2011)
- OS grid reference: SK253144
- District: South Derbyshire
- Shire county: Derbyshire
- Region: East Midlands
- Country: England
- Sovereign state: United Kingdom
- Post town: SWADLINCOTE
- Postcode district: DE12
- Dialling code: 01283
- Police: Derbyshire
- Fire: Derbyshire
- Ambulance: East Midlands

Coton in the Elms is a village and parish in the English county of Derbyshire. At 70 miles (110 km) from the coast, it is one of the furthest places in the United Kingdom from coastal waters. The population of the civil parish as of the 2011 census was 896. It is 5 miles (8.0 km) southwest of Swadlincote and 6 miles (9.7 km) south of Burton upon Trent.

Church Flatts Farm, defined by the Ordnance Survey as the furthest point from the sea in Great Britain, is less than a mile southeast of the village.

== History ==
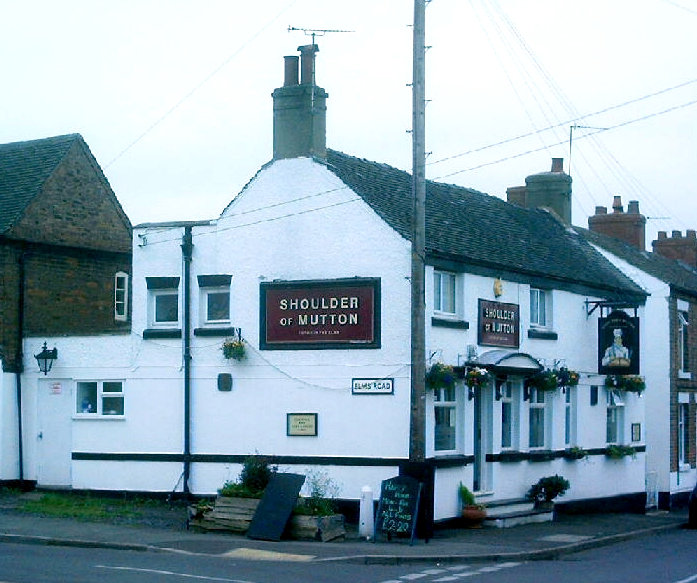
The "Shoulder of Mutton" pub

Coton is mentioned over a thousand years ago when land was transferred to Wulfrige the Black in AD 942. It is also on the salt route known as Walton Way, which starts in nearby Walton-on-Trent.

Coton in the Elms is mentioned in the Domesday Book where it is then spelt Cotes. The book says under the title of “The lands of the Abbey of Burton": (Note: The Abbey of Burton held a considerable number of manors including several in Derbyshire given to it by the king, William the Conqueror. These included Coton in the Elms, Stapenhill, Caldwell, Mickleover and Appleby Magna.)

"In Coton in the Elms Ælfgar had two carucates of land to the geld. There is land for three ploughs. Now the abbot has it of the king. There are now one plough in demesne and six villans and three bordars having two ploughs. TRE worth 40 shillings now 30 shillings." (Note: TRE is a Latinate acronym for Tempore Regis Edwardi, meaning 'in the time of King Edward' (before the Battle of Hastings).)

Coton is on the Walton Way and is first mentioned in 942 in a charter giving land in the area to Wulfrige the Black. This formed part of a much larger estate covering many of the villages in the area. Coton would seem to have been approximately in the centre of this estate. It would appear that it was a crossroads as there is a lane which runs all the way from Tamworth through Coton and on northwards towards Burton on Trent. At the time of Domesday, Burton Abbey held land at Coton, however this had been initially seized by King William, no doubt in part due to the rebellion led by Earl Morcar. However, by the time of Domesday, this land had been restored to Burton. The village itself forms a diamond of roads around a small village green. The original route of the Walton Way may have been the southwest corner of this diamond as this runs past the Church and Church Farm. To the northeast of the village coal mining became important and this is reflected in the lane name Coalpit Lane.

The present church of St Mary was built in 1844-7 by Henry Isaac Stevens, but not on the site of the original church, which was behind the Shoulder of Mutton pub. It has a narrow west tower with a recessed spire. It is generally believed that when the original church fell into disrepair, the bells were taken to the neighbouring Lullington village, so the inhabitants of Coton can still hear the old bells when the wind is blowing in the right direction.

There is a Methodist chapel, built in 1922 to replace a smaller building in Chapel Street. It has also been used as a village hall.

The main occupations of the village inhabitants in the past has been mining and farming, though the pits are now all closed. For many of today's population (896 in 2011), it is a commuter base for the larger towns such as Burton-on-Trent, Swadlincote and Tamworth.

Coton in the Elms has two pubs. The Black Horse was refurbished in 2009. The Queen's Head Inn dates back to the 17th century and part of the premises was once a shop. Another pub, the Shoulder of Mutton, closed in 2010 and is being converted to a house.

The nearest airport to the village is East Midlands Airport which is 21.6 miles away.

== Distance from sea ==
=== Distance from coast ===
Southeast of the village, at grid reference SK253144, is Church Flatts Farm, which is calculated by the Ordnance Survey to be the furthest point from the sea (at the mean low water line) in Great Britain. The location is Latitude: 52° 43.6' N Longitude: 1° 37.2' W. This place in Coton was chosen as equidistant from Fosdyke Wash in Lincolnshire; White Sands between Neston in Cheshire and Flint in Flintshire; and Westbury-on-Severn in Gloucestershire. All of these places are 113 kilometres (70 mi) away.

=== Distance from highest tidal water ===
The nearest high tide point is on the River Trent at Cromwell Lock, north of Newark-on-Trent, in Nottinghamshire, 72 kilometres (45 mi) away.

== Highest recorded temperature ==
On 19 July 2022, a temperature of 38.9 °C (102.0 °F) was recorded in Coton in the Elms, a record for Derbyshire. It broke the record set only the day before of 36.9 °C (98.4 °F), also in Coton in the Elms. The previous Derbyshire record was also at Coton in the Elms: 34.9 °C (94.8 °F) in July 2019.

== Notable residents ==
- Nigel Sims, a goalkeeper in the 1950s and 1960s for Wolverhampton Wanderers, Aston Villa and England B.

== See also ==
- Listed buildings in Coton in the Elms
- Centre points of the United Kingdom
- Coastline of the United Kingdom
- Fenny Drayton – centre of England, 24 kilometres (15 mi) south.
