= Ann Moore (impostor) =

Hoaxer

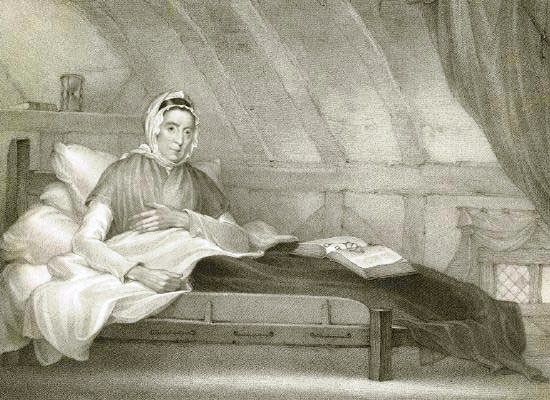
- 1812 engraving by Anthony Cardon
- Born: 31 October 1761; Rosliston in Derbyshire
- Died: 1813; Tutbury
- Occupation: impostor
- Spouse: James Moore
- Children: several
- Parent: Mr Pegg

Ann Moore (31 October 1761 – 1813) was an English woman who became notorious as the fasting-woman of Tutbury. From 1807 to 1813, she claimed to have eaten nothing at all, but her claims were eventually shown to be a hoax.

== Life ==
Ann was born in Rosliston, Derbyshire, the daughter of a day-labourer and sawyer, William Peg (or possibly Pegg), in 1761. In 1788, she married a farm servant, James Moore. By some accounts, she was pregnant at the time. Moore, who may not have believed the child was his, deserted her soon after the marriage. After the separation, Ann returned to work as a housekeeper for a widowed farmer in Aston, near Tutbury, where she had two more children by her employer. In about 1800, she made her way to Tutbury to find employment as a cotton beater. She was, by this point, middle-aged and extremely impoverished, with at least one daughter in her care.

Reduced to dire poverty, she subsisted on the minimum amount of food necessary to support a human being. By November 1806, she had gained a local reputation for reportedly losing all interest in food. By March 1807, she was suffering from stomach cramps and hysterical fits, and she became increasingly confined to her bed. On 20 May 1807, it was reported that she attempted to swallow a piece of biscuit, but the effort was followed by great pain and vomiting of blood. 'The last food she ever took was a few blackcurrants, on 17 July 1807,' and in August, 'she gradually diminished her liquids.'

Pamphlets were distributed about her medical case. Various writers posited that she lived on air, or that she had an esophageal disorder. Religious prophet Joanna Southcott declared that the advent of the fasting-woman presaged a three years' famine in France.

In 1808, local surgeons investigated her case and decided to monitor her for sixteen days straight. Local residents worked in shifts to ensure she was constantly monitored, and bulletins describing her condition were publicly distributed as the monitoring period continued. However, neither the residents nor the visiting surgeons saw any evidence of food or water intake. Robert Taylor and John Allen, two local doctors wrote about the case to the Edinburgh Medical and Surgical Journal in November and December 1808. Both doctors publicly supported her claims, increasing her publicity.

From 1808 to 1813, she continued to attract crowds of visitors many making a substantial donation. By 1812, she was known to have earned £400 in the funds. Writer Mary Howitt, then Mary Botham, was taken to see her as a child. She says that her father told her that not many believed that she ate nothing but that she did eat very little. Mary said that she could only think of the following poem:

"There was an old lady all skin and bone
This old lady was very well known
She lay in bed as I've heard say
For many years to fast and pray
When she had lain a twelvemonth's space
The flesh was gone from hands and face
When that another twelvemonth was gone
She was nothing at all but a skeleton"

In the summer of 1812, Alexander Henderson (1780–1863), Physician to the Westminster General Dispensary, wrote an able Examination of the imposture, showing the inconsistencies and absurdities of the woman's statements, and the curious parallel between the case and that of Anna M. Kinker, a girl of Osnabrück, who practised a similar imposture in Germany in 1800. Henderson reported that Ann claimed to have not eaten solid food for "upwards of five years" and had not drunk liquid for four years. She claimed that she did not pass urine or any other matter.

In 1813, Ann reluctantly agreed to another watch, this time supervised by local writer and clergyman Legh Richmond. She was reportedly reluctant to participate, and particularly objected to the regular weigh-ins. The watch began on 21 April 1813; by 30 April 1813, Moore was visibly emaciated and feverish, and her daughter was forced to stop the study.

Further investigation of Moore's bedsheets showed evidence of excreta and fluids. She initially stood by her story, but later recanted. Evidence suggested her daughter had been smuggling in food via various means, including by putting a towel soaked with broth over her mother's mouth and conveying food from her mouth to her mother's while kissing her.

She died a few months afterwards, aged 53 years.

Some modern historians view her actions as an early form of social protest, while others view it as simple fraud.
