= Walton Hall, Walton-on-Trent =

Walton Hall
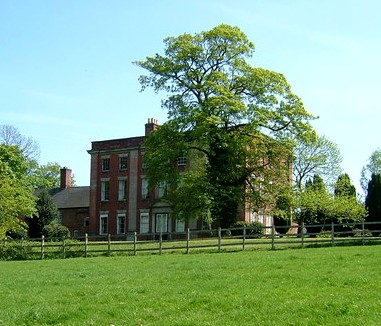
- Walton Hall looks out over the Trent.

- Location within Derbyshire

General information
- Location: Walton on Trent, England
- Coordinates: 52.758°N 1.684°W
- Ordnance Survey: SK2145917882
- Completed: 1723
- Client: William Taylor

Walton Hall is an 18th-century country house situated in the village of Walton on Trent, Derbyshire. It is a Grade II* listed building but is in slow decay and is officially registered on the Buildings At Risk Register.

The Manor of Walton was owned by the Ferrers family from the 14th century until they sold it in 1680 to Richard Taylor. In 1723, William Taylor (High Sheriff of Derbyshire in 1727) replaced the old manor house with the present structure. Built in red brick, the house presents a three-storey balustraded entrance front with seven bays and four full height pilasters. The stable block attached at the rear of the house is in a similar style.

In 1773, the estate passed from the last of William Taylor's sisters to her heir, Edward W Disbrowe MP. Disbrowe's grandson, Edward Cromwell Disbrowe, was born at the house in 1790. On the death of writer Charlotte Anne Albinia Disbrowe in 1918, the estate passed to her heir, Lt Col Henry Edward Disbrowe-Wise, who married Katherine Mary Levett-Prinsep, the daughter of Thomas Levett-Prinsep of nearby Croxall Hall. Lt Col Disbrowe-Wise erected the Walton on Trent village hall in 1920 in memory of his benefactress.

== See also ==
- Grade II* listed buildings in South Derbyshire
- Listed buildings in Walton-on-Trent
