= St Peter's Church, Netherseal =

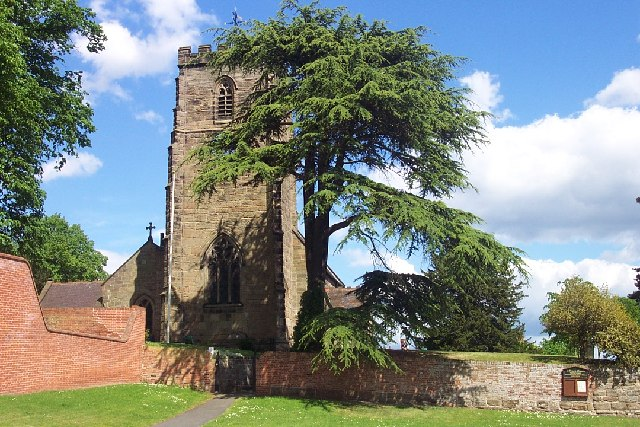
- St Peter's Church, Netherseal
- St Peter's Church, Netherseal
- 52°42′46.8″N 1°34′26.1″W
- Location: Netherseal
- Country: England
- Denomination: Church of England

History
- Dedication: St Peter

Architecture
- Heritage designation: Grade II* listed

Administration
- Province: Province of Canterbury
- Diocese: Diocese of Derby
- Archdeaconry: Derby
- Deanery: Repton
- Parish: Netherseal

St Peter's Church, Netherseal is a Grade II* listed parish church in the Church of England in Netherseal, Derbyshire.

== History ==
The church dates from the 13th century. The tower dates from the 15th century.

It was rebuilt in 1874 under the direction of the architect Arthur Blomfield. The old pews were removed and replaced with open seating. Part of the nave walls and pillars were retained, but the rest was renewed. The vestry was taken down and replaced with a belfry. An organ chamber was provided on the north side of the chancel. Mr. Lilley of Ashby-de-la-Zouch was the contractor. The cost of the restoration was about £2,500 (equivalent to £244,421 in 2025). The church was reopened on 6 May 1874 by the Bishop of Peterborough.

Its Churchyard Extension is the resting place of Sir Nigel Gresley, the famous locomotive engineer.

== Organ ==
The pipe organ was installed by Forster and Andrews in 1874. This was replaced in 1992 by an organ by W Hawkins transferred from Warley Woods Methodist Church. A specification of the organ can be found on the National Pipe Organ Register.

== Parish status ==
The church is in a joint parish with

- St Mary's Church, Coton in the Elms
- St John the Baptist's Church, Croxall cum Oakley
- St Nicholas and the Blessed Virgin Mary's Church, Croxall cum Oakley
- All Saints' Church, Lullington
- St Mary's Church, Rosliston
- St Lawrence's Church, Walton-on-Trent
- St Matthew's Church, Overseal

== See also ==
- Grade II* listed buildings in South Derbyshire
- Listed buildings in Netherseal
