= Catton Hall =

Country house in Derbyshire, England

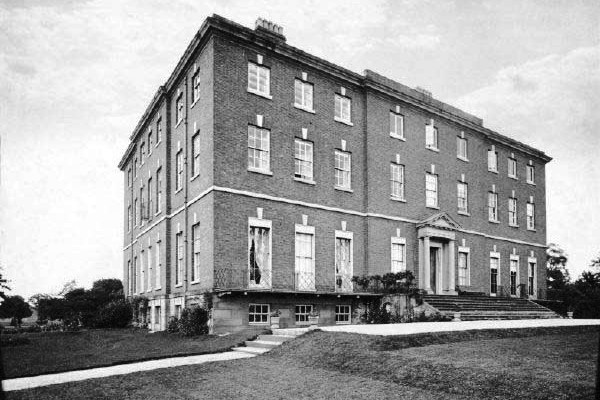
- Catton Hall in about 1875
- Interactive map of the Catton Hall area

General information
- Architectural style: Baroque
- Location: Catton, Derbyshire, England
- Coordinates: 52.73548°N 1.69616°W
- Ordnance Survey: SK2061315359
- Construction started: 1741
- Completed: 1745
- Client: Christopher Horton

Design and construction
- Architect: William Smith
- Engineer: prob. William Pickford

Catton Hall is a country house near the boundary between Derbyshire and Staffordshire, within the civil parish of Catton. It gives its postal address as Walton-on-Trent although there was a village of Catton at one time. It is a Grade II* listed building.

The Manor of Catton was acquired at the beginning of the 15th century by Roger Horton. Members of the family served as High Sheriff of Derbyshire. In 1765 Christopher Horton (d.1768) married Anne, daughter of Simon Luttrell, 1st Earl of Carhampton and later wife of Prince Henry, Duke of Cumberland and Strathearn (brother of King George III). In the 19th century Anne Beatrix Horton, heiress of the estate, married Robert Wilmot thus creating the Wilmot-Horton family. On the death of the fifth Wilmot-Horton Baronet in 1887, the estate passed to his niece Augusta-Theresa who married in 1851 to Rev. Arthur Henry Anson, rector of Potterhanworth, Lincolnshire and son of Hon. Rev. Frederick Anson, Dean of Chester, born at the Anson family home Shugborough Hall.

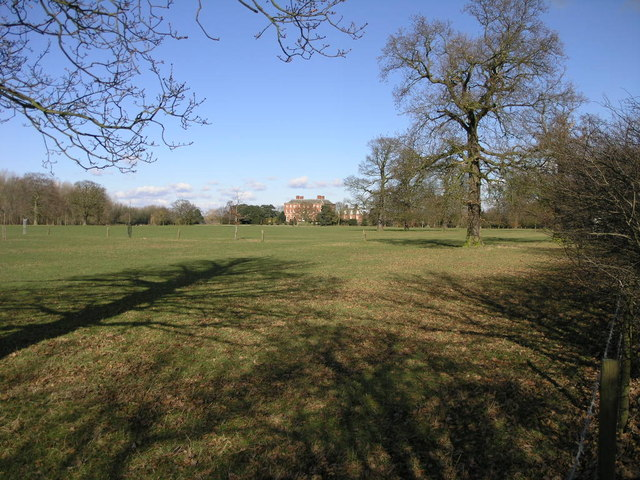
Catton Hall stands in extensive grounds

Catton Hall is now owned by the Neilson family, descendants of Anson-Horton family, descendants of the fifth Baronet, Rev. Sir George Wilmot-Horton. The manor house which had been there since the 15th century was replaced by the current building in 1745. It was built for Christopher Horton, who had rejected many designs before finally accepting a grand design from William Smith in a more baroque style than had been seen at Chatsworth House and more recently and more like Calke Abbey. The building is nine bays wide and three storeys high. Behind the Hall is an 1892 constructed chapel which has a Norman Font (possibly from when the village was mentioned in the Domesday Book).

The Hall is now available for private functions and horse trials. Since 2005, Catton Hall grounds have been home to Bloodstock Open Air heavy metal festival. From 2014 Bearded Theory Festival, also have made Catton Park their home. Catton Hall has also hosted the Festival of Fireworks since 2007, it is held on the first Saturday in September. The UK's largest purchasing consortium, Independent Buyers Ltd has been headquartered at Catton Hall since 2005. Catton Park is also home to the Derbyshire Sausage & Cider Festival and country show.

== See also ==
- Grade II* listed buildings in South Derbyshire
- Listed buildings in Catton, Derbyshire
