= St Mary's Church, Rosliston =

St Mary’s Church, Rosliston
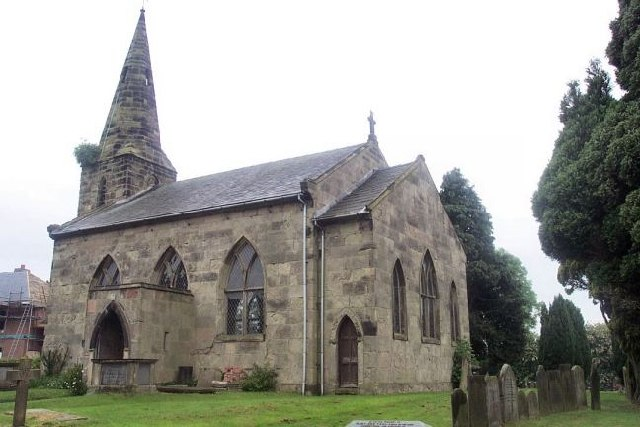
- St Mary’s Church, Rosliston
- St Mary’s Church, Rosliston
- 52°44′54.5″N 1°38′26.9″W
- Location: Rosliston
- Country: England
- Denomination: Church of England

History
- Dedication: St Mary

Architecture
- Heritage designation: Grade II* listed

Administration
- Province: Province of Canterbury
- Diocese: Diocese of Derby
- Archdeaconry: Derby
- Deanery: Repton
- Parish: Rosliston

St Mary's Church, Rosliston is a Grade II* listed parish church in the Church of England in Rosliston, Derbyshire.

== History ==
The church dates back to the 14th century. It was restored in 1802, while the nave and chancel were built in 1819.

The parish achieved notoriety in 1892, when the Reverend John Vallancy, vicar of Rosliston took two members of his congregation to court for interrupting the service. The case at Swadlincote Petty Sessions was thrown out by the magistrates. Two years later, he appeared in the Burton County Court in an action against one of his parishioners, as he disagreed with her habit of placing flowers on her sister's grave. He lost the case and was ordered to pay the defendant's costs. On 18 August 1896, he appeared again at Swadlincote Petty Sessions accused of threatening to shoot a visitor by the name of Wright. He was found guilty and fined 20s. This series of offences resulted in him appearing at a consistory court in 1897, where he was charged by the Bishop of Southwell under the Clergy Discipline Act 1892 (55 & 56 Vict. c. 32). The bishop suspended him for a period of 18 months.

== Organ ==
A specification of the organ can be found on the National Pipe Organ Register.

== Parish status ==
The church is in a joint parish with

- St Mary's Church, Coton in the Elms
- St John the Baptist's Church, Croxall cum Oakley
- St Nicholas and the Blessed Virgin Mary's Church, Croxall cum Oakley
- All Saints' Church, Lullington
- St Peter's Church, Netherseal
- St Lawrence's Church, Walton-on-Trent
- St Matthew's Church, Overseal
