= Netherseal =

Village in Derbyshire, England

Coordinates: 52.715°N 1.577°W

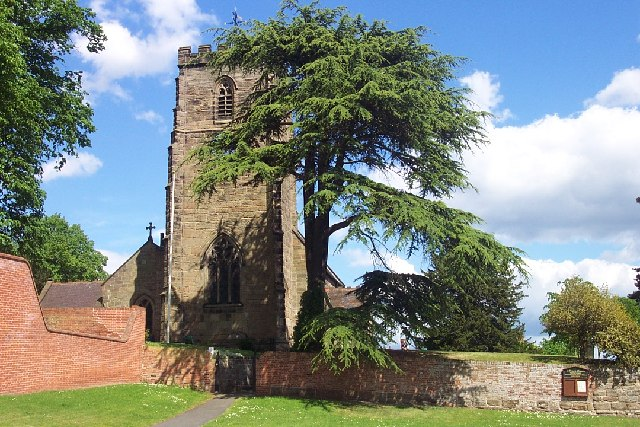
- St. Peter's Church

- Location within Derbyshire
- Population: 923 (2011)
- OS grid reference: SK286131
- District: South Derbyshire
- Shire county: Derbyshire
- Region: East Midlands
- Country: England
- Sovereign state: United Kingdom
- Post town: SWADLINCOTE
- Postcode district: DE12
- Police: Derbyshire
- Fire: Derbyshire
- Ambulance: East Midlands

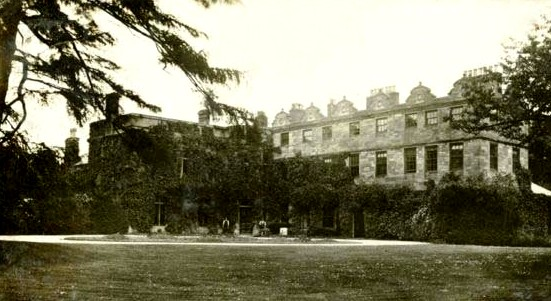
Netherseal Hall, Derbyshire in the early 20th Century.

Netherseal is a village and civil parish in the English county of Derbyshire, situated in the South Derbyshire district. Together with neighbouring Lullington it is the southernmost village in the county. The population of the civil parish as of the 2011 census was 923.

== Location ==
The village is less than 2 miles from the neighbouring county of Leicestershire, and is close to the A444 and the M42 motorway, on the banks of the River Mease.

== History ==
St Peter's Church is the burial place of the railway engineer Sir Nigel Gresley, and the birthplace of the historian Eben William Robertson. It has a couple of 17th–century almshouses, but the home of the Gresley family was demolished in 1933.

The village is home to football team Netherseal St. Peters.

== See also ==
- Listed buildings in Netherseal
- List of places in Derbyshire
