= 2023 South Derbyshire District Council election =

2023 English local election

- 4 May 2023

All 36 seats to South Derbyshire District Council 19 seats needed for a majority

	First party	Second party
Leader	Kevin Richards	Peter Smith (defeated)
Party	Labour	Conservative
Last election	14 seats, 38.8%	22 seats, 53.4%
Seats before	16	16
Seats won	23	10
Seat change	▲9	▼12
Popular vote	24,986	22,487
Percentage	48.5%	43.7%
Swing	▲9.7%	▼9.7%
	Third party	Fourth party
Party	Liberal Democrats	Independent
Last election	0 seats, 0.0%	0 seats, 0.0%
Seats before	0	4 (Note: Of the four independent councillors prior to the election, two formed the "Independent Group", and two were not aligned to any group.)
Seats won	2	1
Seat change	▲2	▲1
Popular vote	2,294	1,401
Percentage	4.5%	2.7%
Swing	N/A	N/A
- Winner of each seat at the 2023 South Derbyshire District Council election
Leader before election
Kevin Richards
Labour
No overall control
Leader after election
Robert Pearson
Labour

The 2023 South Derbyshire District Council election took place on 4 May 2023, to elect all 36 members of South Derbyshire District Council in Derbyshire, England. This was on the same day as other local elections across England. Labour took a majority of the seats on the council, which had previously been under no overall control.

== Summary ==
=== Overview ===
Prior to the election the council was under no overall control; Labour and the Conservatives each had 16 seats each on the council, and there were also four independent councillors. At the 2019 election the Conservatives had taken a majority of the seats, but subsequent defections had led to them losing their majority. Since January 2021 the council had been led by a Labour minority administration, with the leader of the council being Kevin Richards. He chose not to stand for re-election.

Labour won a majority of the seats on the council at the election. The result in Hilton ward was declared void after Conservative candidate Gillian Lemmon died during the election count. The three seats for that ward were therefore left vacant pending a by-election. The Hilton election was subsequently held on 15 June 2023 and saw the Liberal Democrats gain two of the three seats there, giving them their first representation on the council. Conservative group leader Peter Smith was one of the candidates defeated in Hilton ward.

Robert Pearson was appointed the new leader of the council at the annual council meeting on 18 May 2023.

=== Election result ===
Following the results, Labour took the council from no overall control.

2023 South Derbyshire District Council election
Party	Candidates	Seats	Gains	Losses	Net gain/loss	Seats %	Votes %	Votes	+/−
Labour	35	23	9	0	▲9	63.9	48.5	24,986	+9.7
Conservative	36	10	0	12	▼12	27.8	43.7	22,487	–9.7
Liberal Democrats	5	2	2	0	▲2	5.6	4.5	2,294	N/A
Independent	2	1	1	0	▲1	2.8	2.7	1,401	N/A
Green	1	0	0	0	Steady	0.0	0.6	302	N/A

== Ward results ==
The candidates by ward:

=== Aston ===
Aston
Party	Candidate	Votes	%	±%
Conservative	Neil Kenneth Atkin	1,156	50.0	−2.7
Conservative	Peter Watson	1,124	48.7	−1.9
Conservative	Daniel Corbin	1,086	47.0	+3.5
Labour	Ed Green	1,080	46.8	+11.7
Labour	Paul Barry Bickerton	995	43.1	+11.9
Labour	Rodney Paul Sturges	876	37.9	+11.9
Turnout		2,310	31.4	
Conservative hold				
Conservative hold				
Conservative hold				

=== Church Gresley ===
Church Gresley
Party	Candidate	Votes	%	±%
Labour	Alan Steven Haynes	830	57.8	+19.4
Labour	Ben Stuart	799	55.6	+20.0
Labour	Gordon Edgar Rhind	776	54.0	+14.5
Conservative	Roger Redfern	545	38.0	+0.9
Conservative	Jacqueline Andrea Marie Geddes	454	31.6	−5.2
Conservative	Jim Hewlett	435	30.3	−6.4
Turnout		1,436	22.9	
Labour hold				
Labour hold				
Labour gain from Conservative				

=== Etwall ===
Etwall
Party	Candidate	Votes	%	±%
Conservative	David Colin Muller	1,141	61.0	−5.9
Conservative	Andrew William Kirke	1,122	60.0	−16.2
Labour	Robert Anthony Beginn	669	35.8	+13.5
Labour	Damian Belshaw	664	35.5	+16.0
Turnout		1,871	33.3	
Conservative hold				
Conservative hold				

=== Hatton ===
Hatton
Party	Candidate	Votes	%	±%
Labour	Julie Therese Jackson	271	50.1	+19.0
Conservative	Oliver Samuel Wilford Clark	270	49.9	−1.3
Turnout		541	25.5	
Labour gain from Conservative		Swing		

=== Hilton ===
Poll re-run on 15th June due to the death of candidate Gillian Lemmon.

Hilton
Party	Candidate	Votes	%	±%
Liberal Democrats	Jayne Elizabeth Davies	636	39.6	N/A
Conservative	Sundip Meghani	633	39.4	−16.4
Liberal Democrats	Grahame Warwick Andrew	628	39.1	N/A
Conservative	Peter Smith	580	36.1	−14.6
Conservative	Rosa Fawcett	577	36.0	−8.3
Liberal Democrats	Tilo Albert Fritz Paul Scheel	562	35.0	N/A
Labour	Martin Peter Atherton	365	22.7	−5.7
Labour	Angela Mary Peacock	361	22.5	−2.1
Labour	David Henry Peacock	337	21.0	−4.2
Turnout		1,605	21.3	
Registered electors		7,548		
Liberal Democrats gain from Conservative				
Conservative hold				
Liberal Democrats gain from Conservative				

=== Linton ===
Linton
Party	Candidate	Votes	%	±%
Labour	Dan Pegg-Legg	722	54.0	
Labour	Alistair Brian Tilley	630	47.1	
Conservative	Melanie Bridgen	585	43.8	
Conservative	Stuart Thomas Swann	527	39.4	
Turnout		1,337	28.3	
Labour gain from Conservative				
Labour gain from Conservative				

=== Melbourne ===
Melbourne
Party	Candidate	Votes	%	±%
Conservative	Martin Fitzpatrick	741	41.6	−11.7
Labour	Jane Dunster Carroll	708	39.8	−4.1
Conservative	David William Smith	663	37.2	−24.8
Labour	Andrew Victor Clifton	450	25.3	−2.6
Independent	Andy Dawson	342	19.2	N/A
Green	Jonathan Wood	302	17.0	N/A
Liberal Democrats	Jonathan Austin Panes	131	7.4	N/A
Turnout		1,780	41.9	
Conservative hold				
Labour gain from Conservative				

=== Midway ===
Midway
Party	Candidate	Votes	%	±%
Labour	Alan Mercer Jones	795	55.1	
Labour	Robert William Pearson	789	54.6	
Labour	Louise Ann Mulgrew	782	54.2	
Conservative	Barry Peter Thomas Appleby	590	40.9	
Conservative	Margaret Florence Appleby	586	40.6	
Conservative	Sheila Hicklin	560	38.8	
Turnout		1,444	23.6	
Labour gain from Conservative				
Labour hold				
Labour hold				

=== Newhall and Stanton ===
Newhall and Stanton
Party	Candidate	Votes	%	±%
Labour	Sean Andrew Bambrick	908	67.7	+20.3
Labour	Kalila Fiona Storey	807	60.1	+17.6
Labour	Sarah Anne Harrison	806	60.1	+18.4
Conservative	Harriet Charlotte Victoria Manning	409	30.5	−9.0
Conservative	Robert Adrian Argyle	406	30.3	−6.5
Conservative	Christopher Michael Pratt	377	28.1	−6.9
Turnout		1,342	21.4	
Labour hold				
Labour hold				
Labour hold				

=== Repton ===
Repton
Party	Candidate	Votes	%	±%
Conservative	Kerry Marie Haines	1,060	61.8	−7.7
Conservative	James Anthony Lowe	855	49.9	−21.7
Labour	Zoe Gillbe	521	30.4	+6.2
Labour	Margaret Bernadette Mythen	424	24.7	+3.5
Liberal Democrats	Stephen James Hardwick	337	19.7	N/A
Turnout		1,714	39.5	
Conservative hold				
Conservative hold				

=== Seales ===
Seales
Party	Candidate	Votes	%	±%
Independent	Amy Wheelton	1,059	71.7	+22.9
Labour	Gareth Leslie Jones	545	36.9	+7.7
Conservative	Holly Danielle Hawley	460	31.1	−17.7
Conservative	Umesh Anilkumar Kotecha	207	14.0	−34.0
Turnout		1,477	34.3	
Independent gain from Conservative				
Labour gain from Conservative				

=== Stenson ===
Stenson
Party	Candidate	Votes	%	±%
Labour	Lakhvinder Pal Singh	898	69.9	
Labour	David Geoffrey Shepherd	892	69.5	
Conservative	Jill Elizabeth Fitzpatrick	291	22.7	
Conservative	Matthew John Gotheridge	266	20.7	
Turnout		1,284	32.0	
Labour hold				
Labour hold				

=== Swadlincote ===
Swadlincote
Party	Candidate	Votes	%	±%
Labour	Vonnie Heath	783	59.7	+22.2
Labour	Neil Anthony Tilley	773	59.0	+18.8
Labour	Mick Mulgrew	732	55.8	+21.0
Conservative	Kara Paulette Davies	535	40.8	+6.6
Conservative	Rachel May Mould	503	38.4	+6.2
Conservative	Michael Stanley Johnson	460	35.1	+5.7
Turnout		1,311	21.3	
Labour hold				
Labour hold				
Labour hold				

=== Willington and Findern ===
Willington and Findern
Party	Candidate	Votes	%	±%
Labour	Ian Mark Hudson	936	51.3	+20.1
Conservative	Martyn Ford	917	50.3	−4.9
Labour	Ellie Cole	822	45.1	+14.9
Conservative	Liam Dane Booth-Isherwood	747	41.0	−5.4
Turnout		1,824	32.2	
Labour gain from Conservative				
Conservative hold				

=== Woodville ===
Woodville
Party	Candidate	Votes	%	±%
Labour	Steve Taylor	786	56.3	+14.6
Labour	Malc Gee	729	52.2	+12.1
Labour	Angela Archer	725	51.9	+15.1
Conservative	Eric Parker	568	40.7	+4.9
Conservative	Kim Angela Coe	544	39.0	+0.2
Conservative	Sebastian David Coe	507	36.3	+1.0
Turnout		1,396	20.6	
Labour hold				
Labour hold				
Labour gain from Conservative				

== By-elections ==
=== Melbourne ===
Melbourne by-election, 2 May 2024
Party	Candidate	Votes	%	±%
Conservative	Matthew John Gotheridge	928	45.4	
Labour	Jacqueline Ann Lane (Jackie Lane)	681	33.3	
Liberal Democrats	Thomas John James (John James)	219	10.7	
Green	Jonathan Wood	135	6.6	
Reform	Liam Dane Booth-Isherwood	82	4.0	
Majority		334	12.1	N/A
Turnout		2,053	47.7	+5.8
Conservative hold		Swing		

The Melbourne by-election was triggered by the resignation of Conservative councillor Martin Fitzpatrick.

=== Hatton ===
Hatton by-election, 4 July 2024
Party	Candidate	Votes	%	±%
Conservative	Julie Elizabeth Patten	527	43.4	
Labour	Jacqueline Ann Lane (Jackie Lane)	415	34.2	
Liberal Democrats	Tilo Albert Fritz Paul Scheel (Dr Tilo Scheel)	271	22.2	
Turnout		1213	50.6	+25.1
Conservative gain from Labour		Swing		

The Hatton by-election was triggered by the resignation of Labour councillor Julie Jackson.

=== Seales ===
Seales by-election: 6 November 2025
Party	Candidate	Votes	%	±%
Independent	Graham Wood	713	55.7	+4.4
Reform	Ian Baker	309	24.1	N/A
Conservative	David Bell	105	8.2	–14.1
Labour	Marie Haywood	82	6.4	–20.0
Liberal Democrats	Benjamin Hayes	72	5.6	N/A
Majority		404	31.6	N/A
Turnout		1,282	31.1	–3.2
Registered electors		4,255		
Independent gain from Labour				
