= Walter Horton (landowner) =

16th-century English politician

Walter Horton (born ca. 1512), of Catton, Derbyshire and Caloughdon, Warwickshire, was an English landowner in Derbyshire, briefly a member of parliament.

He was one of the two Members of the Parliament of England for Clitheroe in 1559.
