= St Lawrence's Church, Walton-on-Trent =

St Lawrence’s Church, Walton-on-Trent
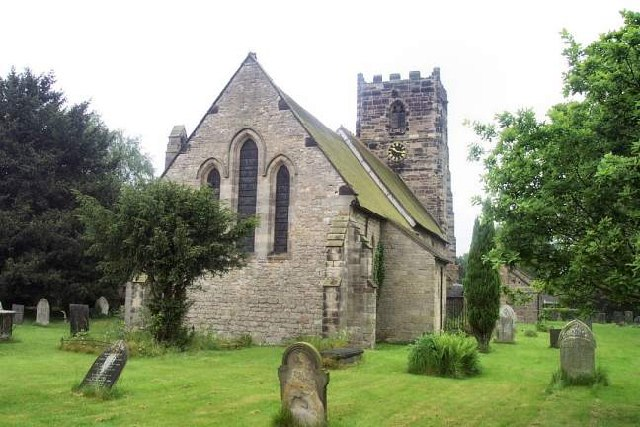
- St Lawrence’s Church, Walton-on-Trent
- St Lawrence’s Church, Walton-on-Trent
- 52°45′40.4″N 1°40′52.7″W
- Location: Walton-on-Trent
- Country: England
- Denomination: Church of England

History
- Dedication: St Lawrence

Architecture
- Heritage designation: Grade II* listed

Administration
- Province: Province of Canterbury
- Diocese: Diocese of Derby
- Archdeaconry: Derby
- Deanery: Repton
- Parish: Walton-on-Trent

St Lawrence's Church, Walton-on-Trent is a Grade II* listed parish church in the Church of England in Walton-on-Trent, Derbyshire.

== History ==
The church dates from the 12th century with elements from the 13th and 15th centuries. It was restored in 1868 by George Edmund Street.

== Organ ==
The pipe organ was installed by Bevington and Sons in 1868. A specification of the organ can be found on the National Pipe Organ Register.

== Parish status ==
The church is in a joint parish with

- St Mary's Church, Coton in the Elms
- St John the Baptist's Church, Croxall cum Oakley
- St Nicholas and the Blessed Virgin Mary's Church, Croxall cum Oakley
- All Saints' Church, Lullington
- St Mary's Church, Rosliston
- St Peter's Church, Netherseal
- St Matthew's Church, Overseal

== See also ==
- Grade II* listed buildings in South Derbyshire
- Listed buildings in Walton-on-Trent
