= 2015 South Derbyshire District Council election =

2015 UK local government election

The 2015 South Derbyshire District Council election took place on 7 May 2015 to elect members of South Derbyshire District Council in England. This was the same day as other local elections.

== Election result ==
After the election, the composition of the council was:

- Conservative 24
- Labour 12

South Derbyshire local election result 2015
Party	Seats	Gains	Losses	Net gain/loss	Seats %	Votes %	Votes	+/−
Conservative	24	5	0	+5	66.7	44.7	22,724	
Labour	12	0	5	-5	33.3	31.2	15,875	
UKIP	0	0	0	0	0.0	21.1	10,731	
Liberal Democrats	0	0	0	0	0.0	2.1	1,084	
Green	0	0	0	0	0.0	0.8	428	

== Ward results ==
Aston-on-Trent
Party	Candidate	Votes	%	±%
Conservative	Neil Atkin	2,009	43.4	
Conservative	Hilary Coyle	1,921		
Conservative	Peter Watson	1,742		
UKIP	Alan Graves	952	20.6	
Labour	Andrew Kempton	879	19.0	
Labour	Paul Bickerton	800		
Labour	Paul Sturges	703		
UKIP	Jill FitzPatrick	693		
UKIP	Ann Graves	673		
Green	Marianne Bamkin	428	9.3	
Liberal Democrats	John Hills	357	7.7	
Majority				
Turnout				
Conservative hold		Swing		
Conservative hold		Swing		
Conservative hold		Swing		

Church Gresley
Party	Candidate	Votes	%	±%
Labour	Trevor Southerd	1,459	38.0	
Conservative	Stuart Swann	1,357	35.3	
Labour	Gordon Rhind	1,305		
Labour	Benjamin Stuart	1269		
Conservative	Anthony Henry	1240		
Conservative	Oliver Clark	1188		
UKIP	Ted Peake	1023	26.6	
UKIP	Graham Prime	706		
UKIP	Craig Robinson	625		
Majority				
Turnout				
Labour hold		Swing		
Conservative gain from Labour		Swing		
Labour hold		Swing		

Etwall
Party	Candidate	Votes	%	±%
Conservative	Lisa Brown	2,277	65.9	
Conservative	David Muller	1,774		
Labour	John McCallum	686	19.8	
Labour	Maureen Timmins	562		
UKIP	Elaine Mellor	493	14.3	
UKIP	Rachel Roberts	251		
Majority				
Turnout				
Conservative hold		Swing		
Conservative hold		Swing		

Hatton
Party	Candidate	Votes	%	±%
Conservative	Andrew Roberts	729	52.8	
Labour	Chris Lee	437	31.7	
UKIP	Michael Harbut	214	15.5	
Majority				
Turnout				
Conservative hold		Swing		

Hilton
Party	Candidate	Votes	%	±%
Conservative	Amy Plenderleith	2,791	57.5	
Conservative	Julie Patten	2,570		
Conservative	Andrew Billings	2,539		
Labour	Stephen Cooper	1219	25.1	
Labour	David Peacock	1127		
Labour	Toni Rogers	885		
UKIP	Tim Day	848	17.5	
UKIP	Donna Horton	569		
UKIP	Alice Stott	455		
Majority				
Turnout				
Conservative hold		Swing		
Conservative hold		Swing		
Conservative hold		Swing		

Linton
Party	Candidate	Votes	%	±%
Conservative	Bob Wheeler	1,032	38.7	
Conservative	John Grant	1,028		
Labour	Kath Lauro	798	29.9	
UKIP	David Gunn	726	27.2	
Labour	Alan Jones	660		
UKIP	Louise Howells	519		
Liberal Democrats	Deborah Johnson	111	4.2	
Liberal Democrats	Lorraine Johnson	102		
Majority				
Turnout				
Conservative hold		Swing		
Conservative hold		Swing		

Melbourne
Party	Candidate	Votes	%	±%
Conservative	John Harrison	1,692	48.2	
Conservative	Jim Hewlett	1,564		
Labour	Jane Carroll	1040	29.6	
Labour	Eastre Leedham	712		
UKIP	Jon Bray	498	14.2	
UKIP	Martin FitzPatrick	486		
Liberal Democrats	John James	279	8.0	
Majority				
Turnout				
Conservative hold		Swing		
Conservative hold		Swing		

Midway
Party	Candidate	Votes	%	±%
Labour	Paul Dunn	1,486	38.6	
Labour	John Wilkins	1,411		
Labour	Robert Pearson	1,399		
Conservative	Shirley Peacock	1390	36.1	
Conservative	Jason Duncan	1309		
Conservative	Andrew Churchill	1279		
UKIP	Barry Appleby	977	25.4	
UKIP	Peter Powell	858		
UKIP	David Smith	784		
Majority				
Turnout				
Labour hold		Swing		
Labour hold		Swing		
Labour hold		Swing		

Newhall and Stanton
Party	Candidate	Votes	%	±%
Labour	Sean Bambrick	1,683	41.9	
Labour	Kev Richards	1,519		
Labour	Linda Stuart	1,471		
Conservative	Barry Woods	1366	34.0	
Conservative	Christopher Pratt	1027		
Conservative	Roland Salt	992		
UKIP	Brian Shuttlewood	972	24.2	
UKIP	Lorrae Gee	926		
Majority				
Turnout				
Labour hold		Swing		
Labour hold		Swing		
Labour hold		Swing		

Repton
Party	Candidate	Votes	%	±%
Conservative	Michael Stanton	1,883	62.7	
Conservative	Peter Smith	1,797		
Labour	Brian Cox	685	22.8	
Labour	Fiona Wilks	647		
UKIP	James Ault	434	14.5	
UKIP	Karen Prime	338		
Majority				
Turnout				
Conservative hold		Swing		
Conservative hold		Swing		

Seales
Party	Candidate	Votes	%	±%
Conservative	Margaret Hall	1,371	45.3	
Conservative	Peter Smith	1,797		
Labour	Steve Frost	1005	33.2	
Labour	Graham Knight	925		
UKIP	Ian Mellor	650	21.5	
Majority				
Turnout				
Conservative hold		Swing		
Conservative gain from Labour		Swing		

Stenson
Party	Candidate	Votes	%	±%
Labour	Manjit Chahal	1,087	52.8	
Labour	David Shepherd	1,073		
Conservative	Jordan Kerry	600	29.1	
Conservative	James Coyle	545		
UKIP	Richard Gee	372	18.2	
UKIP	Ian Crompton	239		
Majority				
Turnout				
Labour hold		Swing		
Labour hold		Swing		

Swadlincote
Party	Candidate	Votes	%	±%
Conservative	Sandra Wyatt	1,347	38.2	
Conservative	Robert Coe	1,308		
Labour	Neil Tilley	1300	36.8	
Labour	Vonnie Heath	1280		
Labour	Mick Mulgrew	1202		
Conservative	Shane Roberts	1083		
UKIP	Aaron Keightly	881	25.0	
UKIP	Ray Tipping	848		
UKIP	Andrew Wakeling	736		
Majority				
Turnout				
Conservative gain from Labour		Swing		
Conservative gain from Labour		Swing		
Labour hold		Swing		

Willington and Findern
Party	Candidate	Votes	%	±%
Conservative	Martyn Ford	1,437	54.4	
Conservative	Andrew MacPherson	1,333		
Labour	Jonathan England	680	25.8	
UKIP	Margaret Benfield	523	19.8	
Labour	Peter Bonnell	499		
UKIP	Thomas Liscombe	409		
Majority				
Turnout				
Conservative hold		Swing		
Conservative hold		Swing		

Woodville
Party	Candidate	Votes	%	±%
Conservative	Kim Coe	1,443	32.7	
Labour	Steve Taylor	1,431	32.7	
Conservative	Gilliam Farrington	1,317		
Labour	Sue Taylor	1239		
Conservative	Andrew Stevenson	1236		
UKIP	Mike Dawson	1168	26.7	
Labour	Malc Gee	1167		
UKIP	Lee Stockburn	839		
UKIP	Alan Watts	739		
Liberal Democrats	Rebecca Wilkinson	337	7.7	
Majority				
Turnout				
Conservative hold		Swing		
Labour hold		Swing		
Conservative gain from Labour		Swing		
