= Walton-on-Trent =

Village in Derbyshire, England

Coordinates: 52.760°N 1.680°W

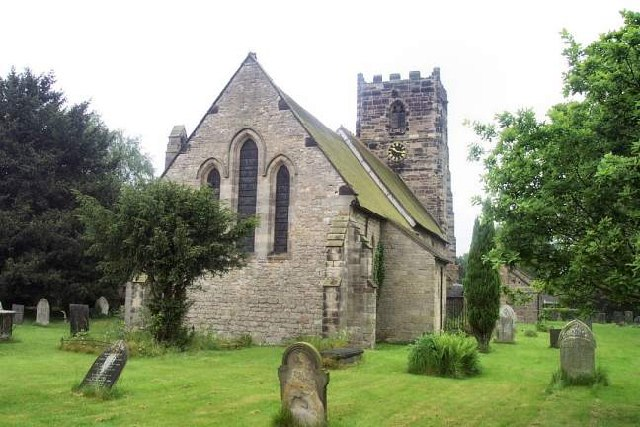
- St Lawrence Church, Walton-on-Trent

- Location within Derbyshire
- Interactive map of Walton-on-Trent
- Population: 872 (2011)(census) or 891 (2018)(estimate)
- OS grid reference: SK216180
- Civil parish: Walton upon Trent
- District: South Derbyshire
- Shire county: Derbyshire
- Region: East Midlands
- Country: England
- Sovereign state: United Kingdom
- Post town: SWADLINCOTE
- Postcode district: DE12
- Police: Derbyshire
- Fire: Derbyshire
- Ambulance: East Midlands

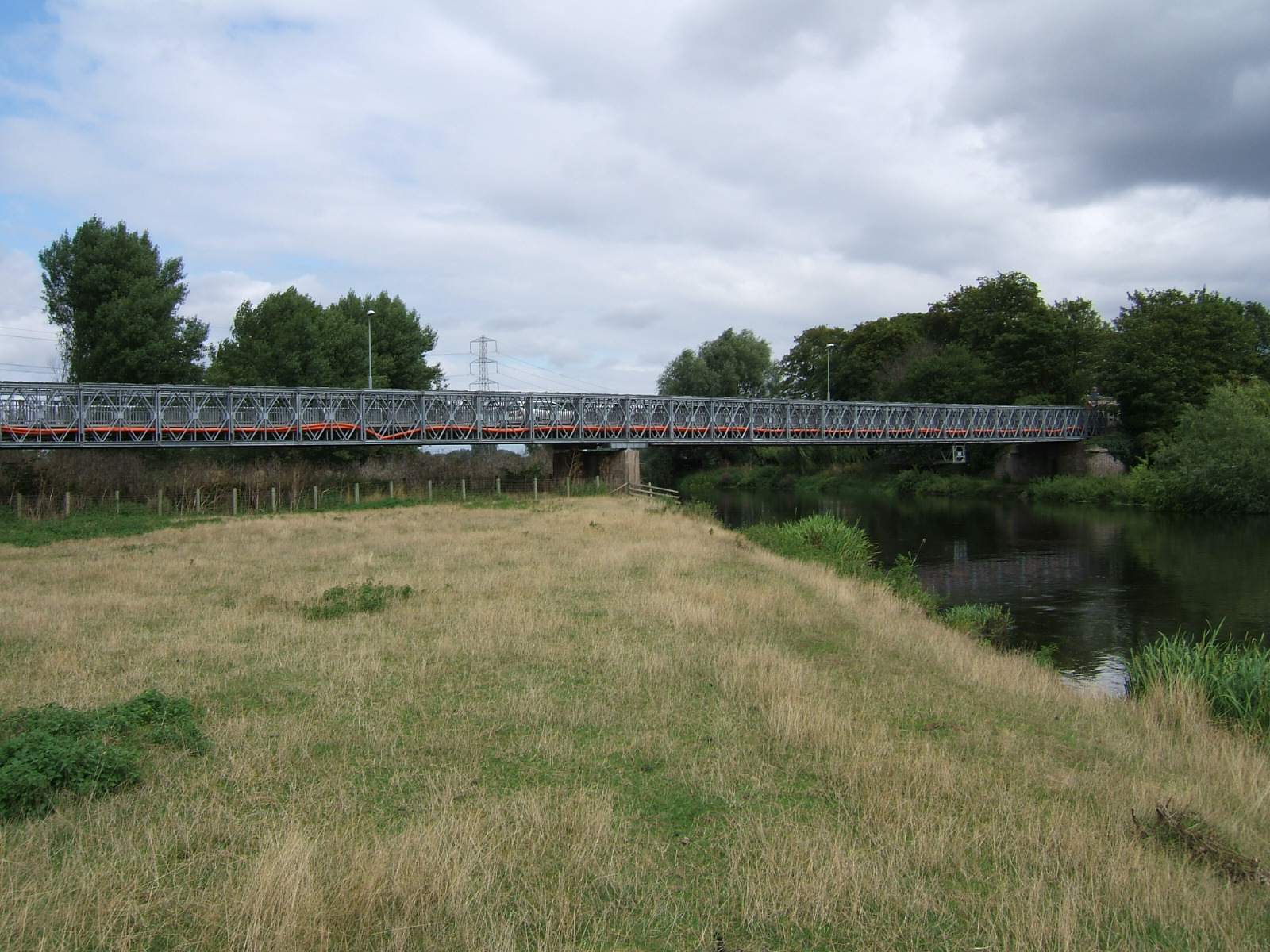
Bailey Bridge

Walton-on-Trent is a village within the civil parish of Walton-upon-Trent, in the National Forest in the South Derbyshire district in Derbyshire, England. The population of the civil parish as taken at the 2011 Census was 872.

== The bridge at Walton ==
King Edward II crossed the river in pursuit of the disaffected barons including the Earl of Lancaster. Listed buildings in the parish include Catton Hall, and Walton Hall. The original bridge was built in 1834 and lasted for over one hundred years before being replaced in 1948 by a temporary Bailey bridge. The Royal Engineers erected this over the top of the old bridge, part of which was removed to allow a support to be built on the Staffordshire bank of the river, the temporary bridge had to be built due to flood damage to the old bridge after the severe winter of 1947. This bridge had to again be replaced in 1974 by a more modern version of the temporary bridge. The old bridge was a toll bridge for many years and pictures of the "old bridge" and the toll house are still available.

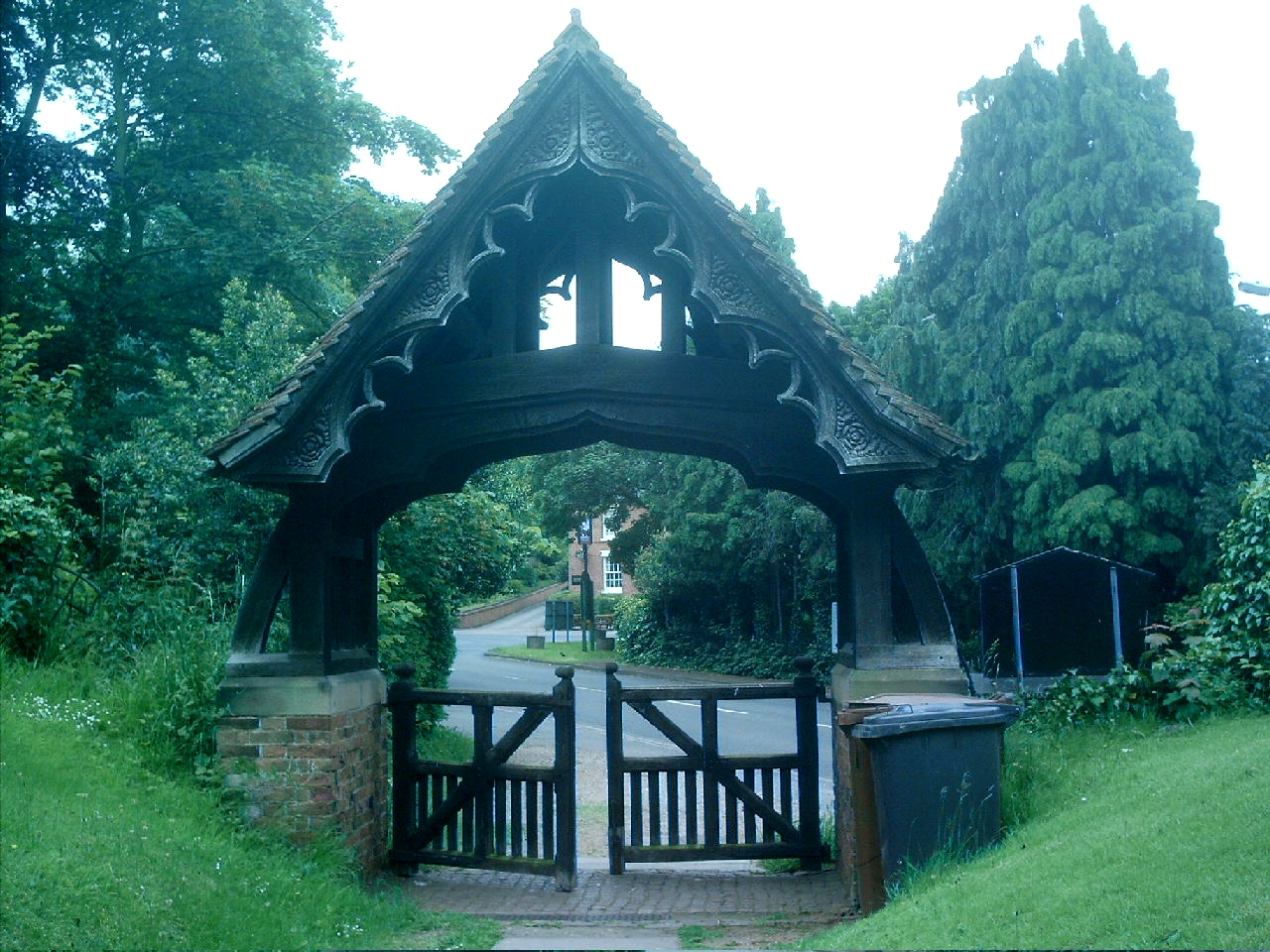
The Lychgate - in the background is the White Swan

== Church ==
St Lawrence's Church, Walton-on-Trent, prominently boasts its founding as "c.1000" on the sign by its lychgate. At about that time it would have been in the ownership of Aelfgar, an Anglo-Saxon who also had interests which included manors at Weston-on-Trent, Newton Solney and Repton. It is his name that is given as the former owner of Walton-on-Trent's church, mill, 40 acres (160,000 m^{2}) of meadow and 35 square furlongs of pasture when the new king took them as part of his personal reward for winning the English crown.

The village has a Church of England school.

== Catton Hall ==
Catton Hall gives its postal address as Walton on Trent although there was a village of Catton at one time. Catton Hall is owned by the Neilson family, descendants of Anson-Horton family, who themselves were descendants of the Fifth Baronet, Rev. Sir George Wilmot-Horton. The Hall is now available for private functions and horse trials. The hall has been there since the 15th century but the current building was founded in 1745. Annually, Catton Hall hosts heavy metal festival Bloodstock Open Air featuring prominent bands such as Children of Bodom, Opeth, and Nightwish.

== See also ==
- Listed buildings in Walton-on-Trent
