= Lullington, Derbyshire =

Village in Derbyshire, England

Coordinates: 52.715°N 1.632°W

Lullington
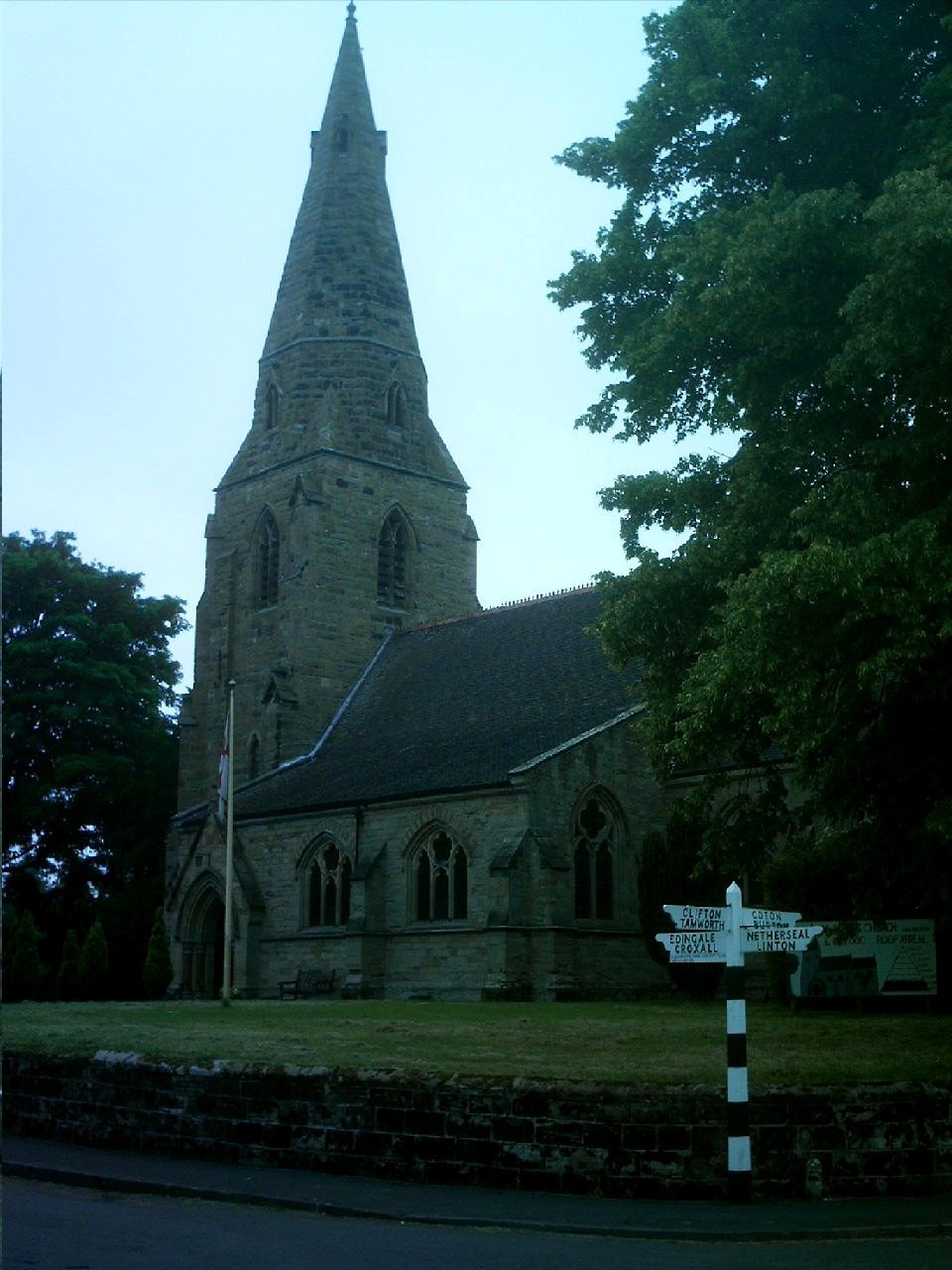
- All Saints' Church, Lullington

- Location within Derbyshire
- Population: 121 (2011)
- OS grid reference: SK249131
- District: South Derbyshire
- Shire county: Derbyshire
- Region: East Midlands
- Country: England
- Sovereign state: United Kingdom
- Post town: SWADLINCOTE
- Postcode district: DE12
- Dialling code: 01827
- Police: Derbyshire
- Fire: Derbyshire
- Ambulance: East Midlands

Lullington is a village and civil parish in the district of South Derbyshire in Derbyshire, England. The population of the civil parish at the 2011 Census was 121. It has an All Saints' Church, a village hall and a pub, the Colvile Arms (Charles Robert Colvile was living at Lullington Hall in the 1850s). Together with neighbouring Netherseal, it is the southernmost village in Derbyshire.

== History ==
Lullington is mentioned in the Domesday Book where it is then spelt Lullitune. The book says under the title of "The lands of the King's Thegns":

In Lullington Auti had five carucates of land to the geld. There is land for five ploughs. There now Edward has of the king 21 villans and three bordars having four ploughs. There is a priest and one mill rendering 6s 8d (33p) and twelve acres of meadow. TRE as now worth four pounds."

== See also ==
- Listed buildings in Lullington, Derbyshire
