= Rosliston =

Village in Derbyshire, England

Coordinates: 52.748°N 1.642°W

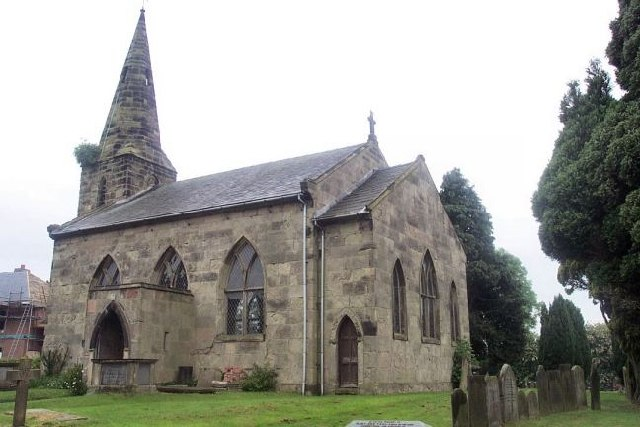
- St Mary's Church, Rosliston

- Location within Derbyshire
- Population: 642 (2011)
- OS grid reference: SK242167
- District: South Derbyshire
- Shire county: Derbyshire
- Region: East Midlands
- Country: England
- Sovereign state: United Kingdom
- Post town: SWADLINCOTE
- Postcode district: DE12
- Police: Derbyshire
- Fire: Derbyshire
- Ambulance: East Midlands

Rosliston is a small village and civil parish in South Derbyshire, England close to the county boundaries of Leicestershire and Staffordshire. The civil parish population at the 2011 Census was 642.

== Location ==
It is within The National Forest and just outside the village is the Rosliston Forestry Centre.

== History ==
The manor belonged to Earl Algar, son of Earl Leofric and Countess (Lady) Godiva. In the Domesday Book the manor was called Redlauseton after it was taken by William the Conqueror, and it included a church and a mill. During World War II a prisoner of war camp was built near to the village to hold German and Italian prisoners. After the end of the war the camp was used to accommodate Polish servicemen.

== Features ==
The main features are St. Mary's Church, Rosliston Forestry Centre, The Bull's Head pub, Co-op supermarket and Beehive woodland lakes.

The Forestry centre is sustainable. It provides facilities to help the environment. It provides bins to collect litter and footpaths to stop visitors from eroding the naturally-made paths of Rosliston. These footpaths are clearly marked so that visitors know where it is safe to walk.

== Education ==
Rosliston Primary School is a Church of England school located in the heart of the village. It is divided into Reception, Infants, Lower Juniors, and Upper Juniors.

== Notable residents ==
- Ann Moore (née Pegg) - the fasting woman of Tutbury was born here in 1761
- The Reverend John Vallancy (1843–1906) was vicar of Rosliston for 16 years. He was aggressive towards his parishioners, sometimes threatening them with a stick. On one occasion he produced a revolver and made "ominous overtones". After villagers made an effigy of him, which was hung outside the vicarage and burnt, he was banished from the parish for 18 months by his Bishop.
- Barry Butlin, a former English footballer, most noted as a player for Luton Town and Nottingham Forest was born in Rosliston.

== Gallery ==
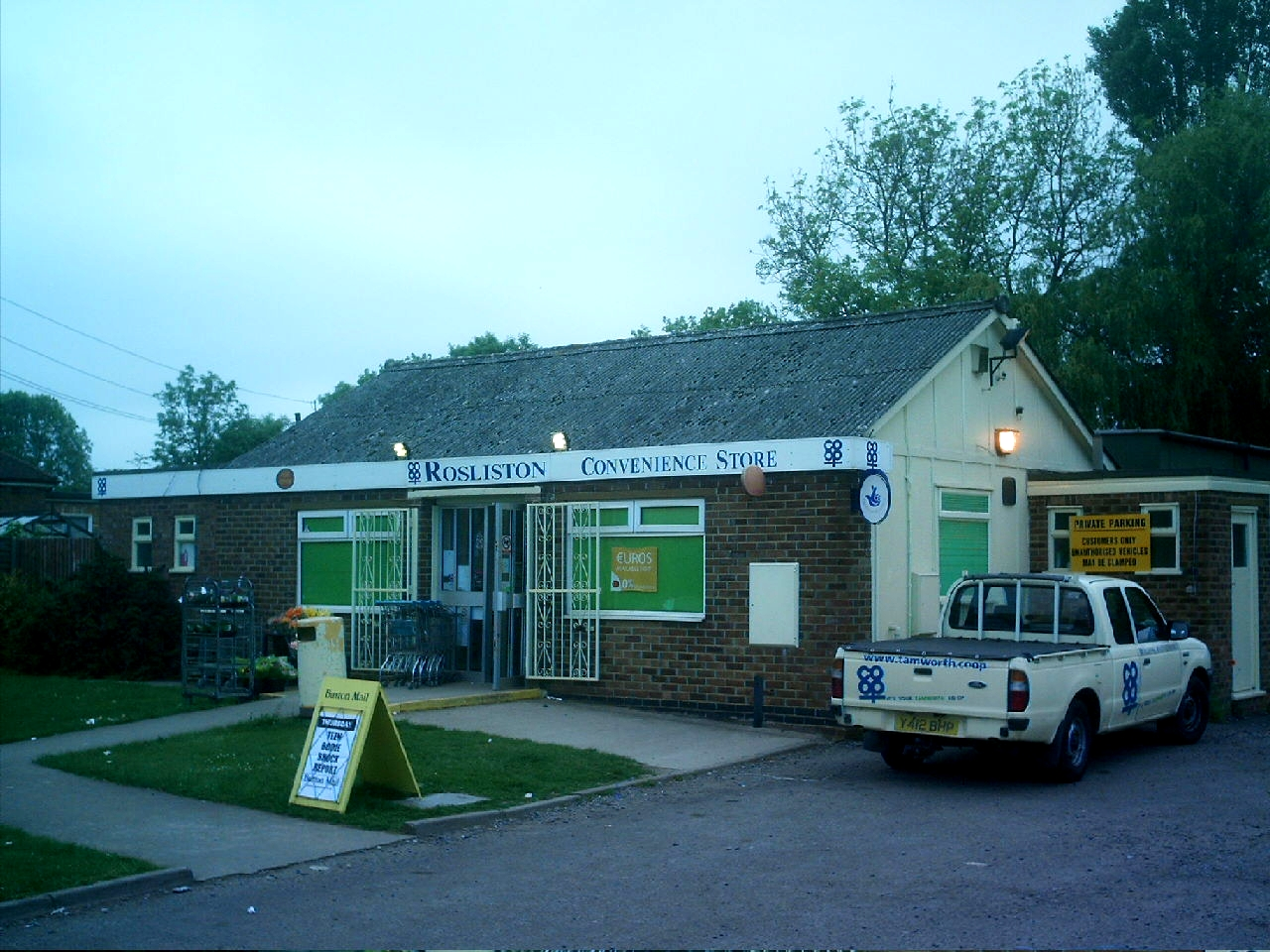
The Co-op Convenience Store at Rosliston.

== See also ==
- List of places in Derbyshire
