= South Derbyshire =

Coordinates: 52°48′N 1°32′W

South Derbyshire District
- Non-metropolitan district
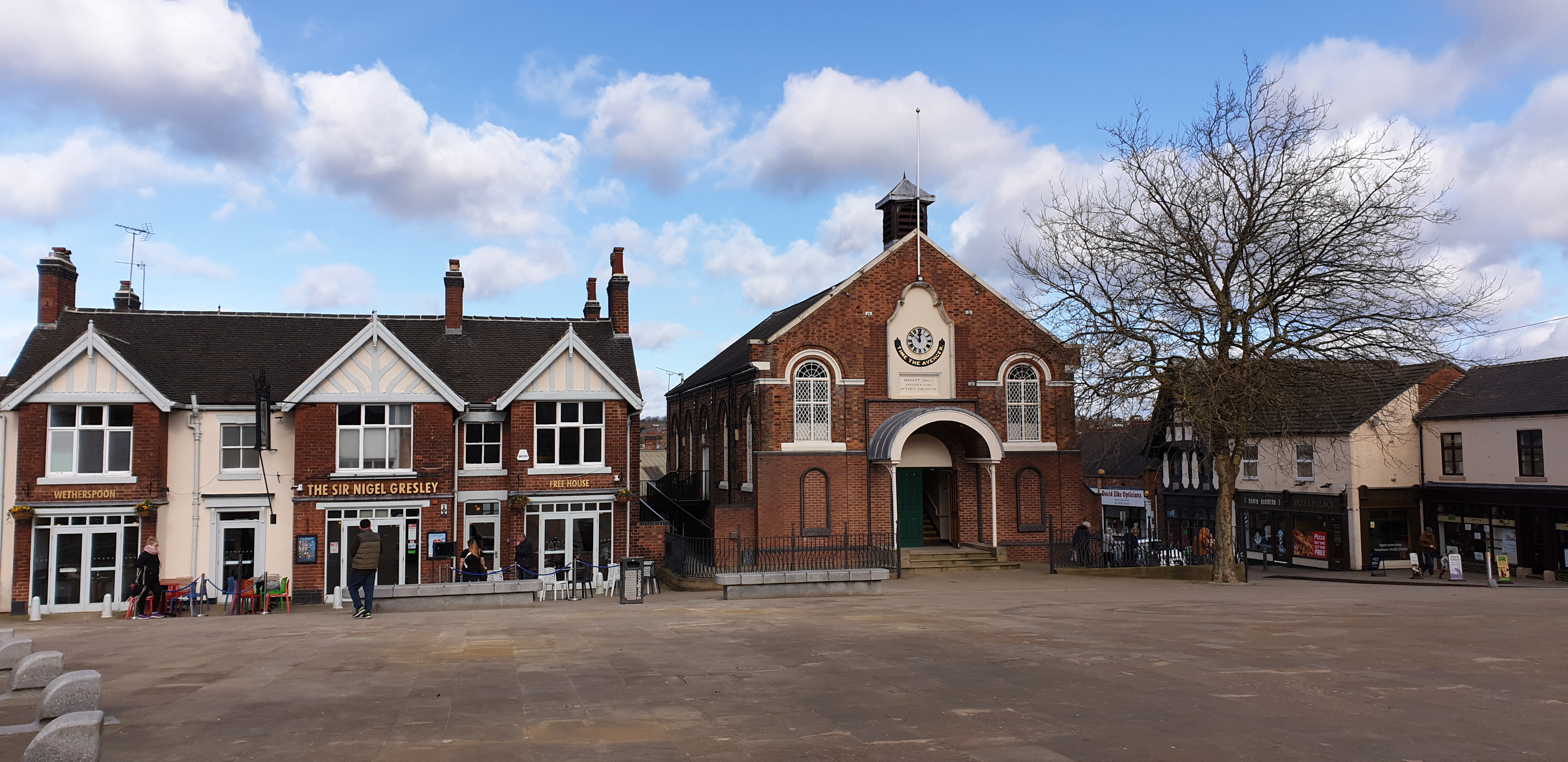
- Swadlincote, the administrative centre of the South Derbyshire district

- Shown within Derbyshire
- Sovereign state: United Kingdom
- Constituent country: England
- Region: East Midlands
- Administrative county: Derbyshire
- Admin. HQ: Swadlincote

Government
  - Type: Non-metropolitan district
  - Body: South Derbyshire District Council
  - MP: Samantha Niblett

Area
  - Total: 131 sq mi (338 km^{2})
  - Rank: 109th

Population (2025)
  - Total: 119,441
  - Rank: Ranked 211th
  - Density: 915/sq mi (353/km^{2})

Ethnicity (2021)
  - Ethnic groups: List: 93.1% White; 3.6% Asian; 1.8% Mixed; 0.8% Black; 0.7% other

Religion (2021)
  - Religion: List: 50.1% Christianity; 45.5% no religion; 3.6% other; 0.8% Islam
- Time zone: UTC+0 (Greenwich Mean Time)
  - Summer (DST): UTC+1 (British Summer Time)
- Postcode: DE
- ONS code: 17UK (ONS); E07000039 (GSS)

South Derbyshire is a local government district in Derbyshire, England. The district covers the towns of Melbourne and Swadlincote as well as numerous villages and hamlets such as Hilton, Hatton, Etwall, Aston-on-Trent, Repton, Weston-on-Trent and Willington. About a third of the National Forest lies within the district.

The neighbouring districts are Derbyshire Dales, Amber Valley, Derby, Erewash, North West Leicestershire, Lichfield and East Staffordshire.

== History ==
The district was formed on 1 April 1974 under the Local Government Act 1972, covering the whole area of two former districts and part of a third, which were all abolished at the same time:

- Repton Rural District
- South East Derbyshire Rural District (part south of the River Derwent, rest went to Erewash)
- Swadlincote Urban District

The new district was named South Derbyshire, reflecting its position within the wider county.

Under current local government restructuring plans it is planned that the district will be abolished in 2028, with its area forming part of a new Derbyshire South unitary authority.

== Governance ==
South Derbyshire District Council

Type
- Type: Non-metropolitan district

Leadership
- Chair: Alistair Tilley, Labour since 21 May 2026
- Leader: Robert Pearson, Labour since 18 May 2023
- Chief Executive: Justin Ives since 2 May 2023

Structure
- Seats: 36 councillors
- Graph of the party split among 36 seats.
- Political groups: Administration (21) Labour (21) Other parties (15) Conservative (11) Liberal Democrats (2) Independent (2)

Elections
- Last election: 4 May 2023
- Next election: 6 May 2027

Meeting place
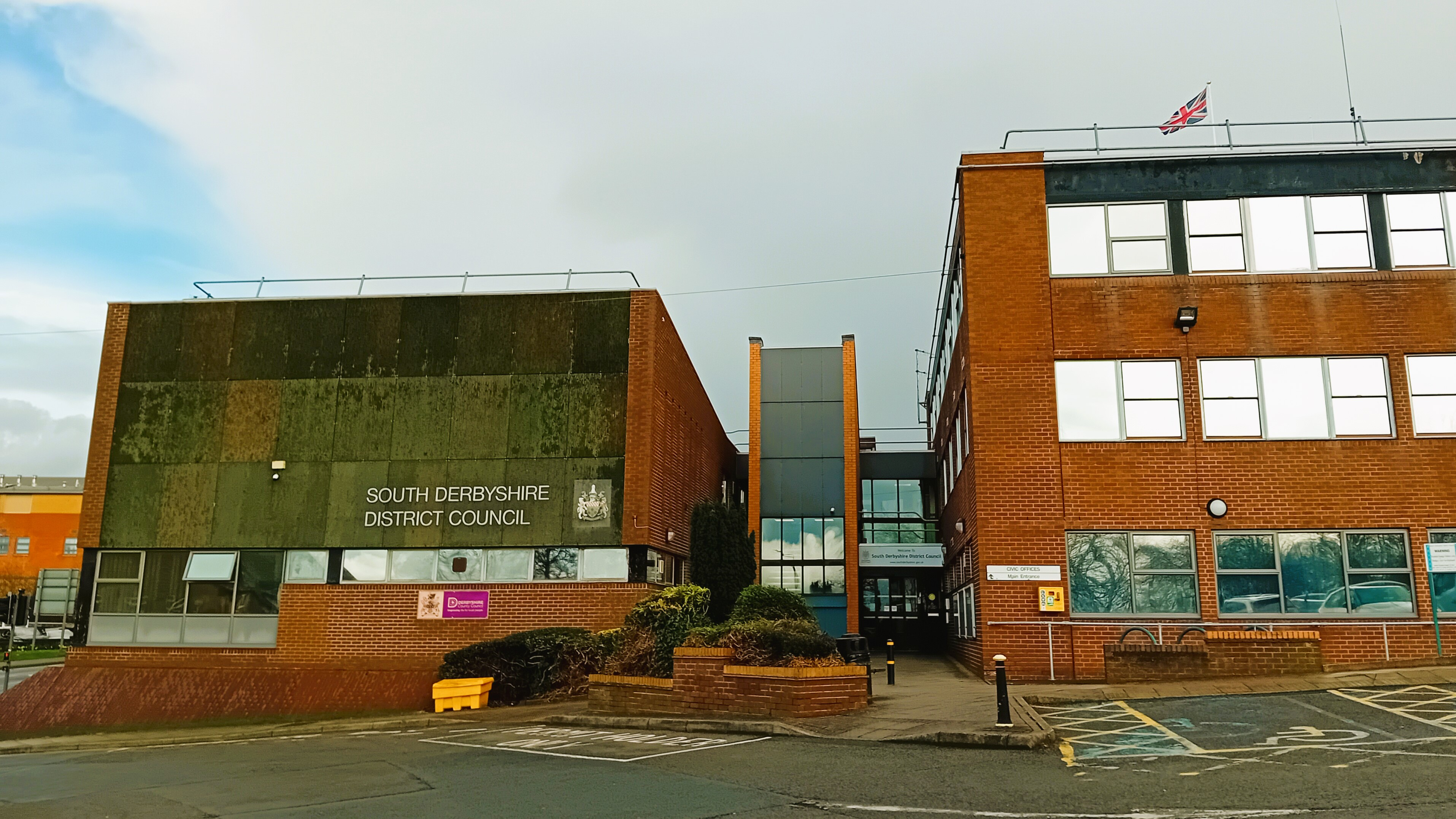
- Civic Offices, Civic Way, Swadlincote, DE11 0AH

Website
- www.southderbyshire.gov.uk

South Derbyshire District Council provides district-level services. County-level services are provided by Derbyshire County Council. Much of the borough is also covered by civil parishes, which form a third tier of local government.

=== Political control ===
The council has been under Labour majority control since the 2023 election.

The first election to the council was held in 1973, initially operating as a shadow authority alongside the outgoing authorities until the new arrangements came into effect on 1 April 1974. Political control of the council since 1974 has been as follows:

Party in control	Years
Labour	1974–1976
No overall control	1976–1983
Labour	1983–2007
Conservative	2007–2020
No overall control	2020–2023
Labour	2023–present

=== Leadership ===
The leaders of the council since 1999 have been:

Councillor	Party	From	To
Jane Carroll	Labour		May 1999
Bill Dunn	Labour	20 May 1999	2001
Barrie Whyman	Labour	2001	May 2007
Heather Wheeler	Conservative	24 May 2007	May 2010
Bob Wheeler	Conservative	20 May 2010	18 Jan 2018
Hilary Coyle	Conservative	18 Jan 2018	May 2018
Martyn Ford	Conservative	17 May 2018	3 Jan 2021
Kevin Richards	Labour	14 Jan 2021	May 2023
Robert Pearson	Labour	18 May 2023	

=== Composition ===
Following the 2023 election, and subsequent by-elections and changes of allegiance up to September 2026, the composition of the council was:

Party	Seats
Labour	21
Conservative	11
Liberal Democrats	2
Independent	2
Total	36

The next election is due in 2027.

=== Elections ===
Since the last boundary changes in 2011 the council has comprised 36 councillors, representing 15 wards, with each ward electing one, two or three councillors. Elections are held every four years.

=== Premises ===
The council is based at the Civic Offices on Civic Way in Swadlincote. The building was purpose-built for the council and was formally opened on 18 February 1977 by Jack Longland. The council's annual meeting each May, when new the new chair is appointed, is held at Swadlincote Town Hall on The Delph, which had been built as a market hall in 1861.

== Parishes and settlements ==
Map of South Derbyshire

The former Swadlincote Urban District is an unparished area. The rest of the district is covered by civil parishes. None of the parishes is styled as a "town council". Some of the smaller parishes have a parish meeting instead of a parish council.

Settlements in the district include:

- Aston-on-Trent
- Barrow upon Trent, Boulton Moor, Bretby
- Calke, Castle Gresley, Cauldwell, Church Gresley, Church Broughton, Coton in the Elms
- Chellaston Fields (excludes rest of Chellaston which falls under Derby.)
- Egginton, Elvaston, Etwall
- Hartshorne, Hatton, Hilton, Hollington
- Ingleby
- Kings Newton
- Linton, Lullington
- Melbourne (Town), Milton
- Netherseal, Newton Solney, Newhall
- Overseal
- Repton, Rosliston
- Shardlow, Smisby, Stanton by Bridge, Stenson Fields, Swadlincote (Town), Swarkestone
- Ticknall
- Walton-on-Trent, Weston-on-Trent, Willington, Woodville

== Media ==
South Derbyshire is served by BBC East Midlands and ITV Central (East) with television signals received from the Waltham transmitter. Southern parts of the district such as Swadlincote receives better television signals from the Sutton Coldfield transmitter which broadcast BBC West Midlands and ITV Central (West).

Radio stations for the area are BBC Radio Derby, Capital Mid-Counties, Smooth East Midlands, Hits Radio East Midlands and Greatest Hits Radio Midlands.

The area is served by the local newspaper, Burton Mail.

== Arms ==
Coat of arms of South Derbyshire

Crest
On a wreath of the colours upon a mount Sable inflamed a tower Argent rising therefrom clouds of steam Proper.
Escutcheon
Vert on a chevron Or masoned Sable between three garbs Or a like number of annulets also Sable a chief vairy Ermine and Gules.
Supporters
On the dexter side a lion Ermine gorged with a collar vairy Ermine and Gules and on the sinister side a wolf Erminois gorged with a collar quarterly Ermine and Gules each charged on the shoulder with a Rose Gules barbed Proper thereon another Argent barbed and seeded also Proper.
Motto
The Earth Our Wealth
