= Sir Nigel Gresley, 6th Baronet =

British land owner and canal builder (1726–1787)

Sir Nigel Gresley
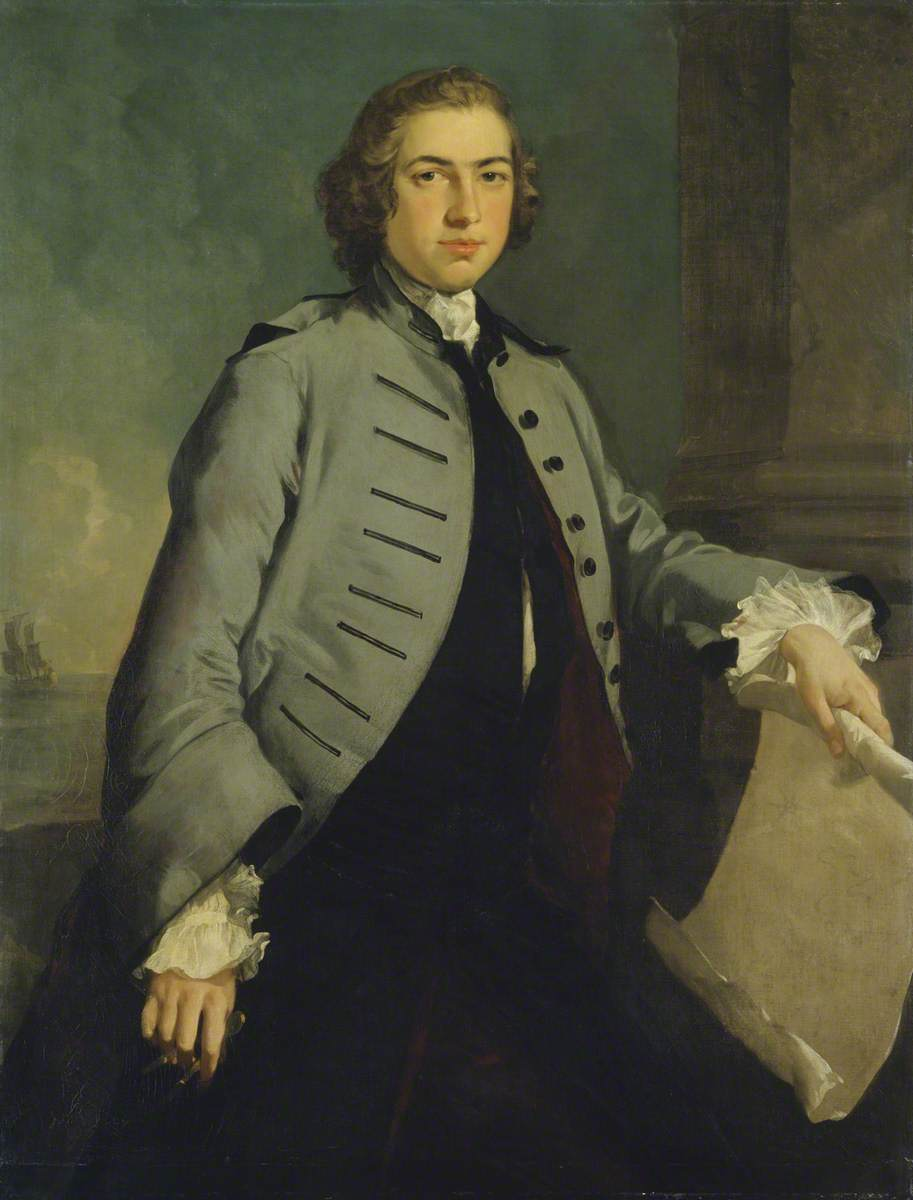
- Sir Nigel Gresley by Henry Pickering
- Born: January 11, 1726; Drakelow Hall, Derbyshire
- Died: April 7, 1787 (aged 61); Bath, Somerset
- Burial place: Bath Abbey
- Known for: Sir Nigel Gresley's Canal

Sir Nigel Gresley, 6th Baronet (11 January 1726 – 7 April 1787) was an English landowner, mineowner, and canal builder. Born into the Gresley family of Staffordshire, he enrolled at an early age in the Royal Naval Academy. He served in the Royal Navy for eight years, attaining the rank of lieutenant, before his career was cut short due to rheumatic issues. In 1753 he inherited his brother's baronetcy, and became owner of estates at Drakelow and Knypersley. As part of these he owned several mines at Apedale, and in 1775 he obtained an Act of Parliament to build Sir Nigel Gresley's Canal, which was completed in the following year and held a monopoly over Newcastle-under-Lyme coal for forty-two years. He died at Bath, Somerset, in 1787.

== Life ==
Nigel Gresley was born on 11 January 1726 at Drakelow Hall and was baptised on 29 January. The son of Sir Thomas Gresley, 4th Baronet, and his first wife Dorothy Bowyer, the daughter of Sir William Bowyer, his family was long established in Staffordshire and held the sixth oldest baronetcy in the country. Gresley joined the Royal Naval Academy as a scholar on 21 February 1740 and stayed there until 1744.

Continuing his service in the Royal Navy, by the end of 1746 Gresley was serving in the 24-gun frigate HMS Bridgewater, a prison ship stationed in the Firth of Forth, as a volunteer. Bridgewater transported the Jacobite rising rebel Flora MacDonald to London, leaving on 7 November and arriving in the River Thames on 29 November. Gresley, who was suggested to be a quiet supporter of the Jacobites, was gifted a Richard Wilson portrait of her in thanks for the kindness shown to her in captivity. He was then promoted to lieutenant on 22 April 1748 and was appointed to serve on the 22-gun frigate HMS Inverness, which he did until she was paid off on 14 November of the same year, having served only in home waters. He did not serve again in the Royal Navy, probably due to rheumatic issues, and declined a posting to the 24-gun frigate HMS Mercury in March of 1749 or 1750.

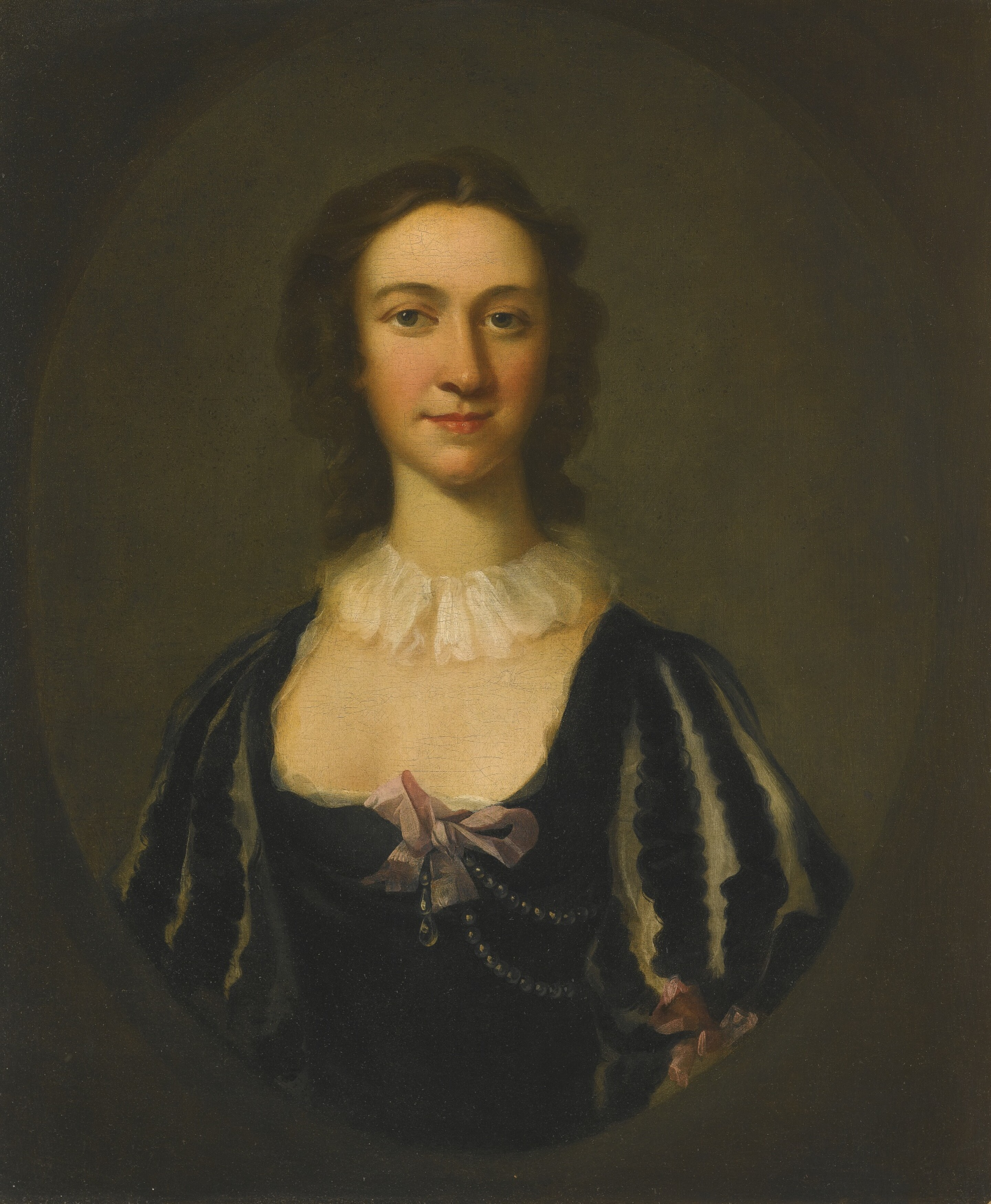
A variation of the portrait gifted to Gresley by Flora MacDonald

Gresley's Estate Act 1767
- Act of Parliament
- Parliament of Great Britain
- Long title: An Act for vesting Part of the Estate of Sir Nigel Gresley Baronet, in the County of Stafford, in Trustees, to be sold, to raise Money for the Payment of Debts, and other Purposes therein mentioned.
- Citation: 7 Geo. 3. c. 56 Pr.
- Territorial extent: Great Britain

Dates
- Royal assent: 15 April 1767
- Commencement: 11 November 1766 (Note: Start of session.)

Status: Current legislation

Gresley succeeded his elder brother Sir Thomas Gresley, 5th Baronet as baronet on 23 December 1753 after the latter died of smallpox without issue. As well as Drakelow in Derbyshire, Gresley inherited from his mother's family their home of Knypersley Hall at Biddulph, Staffordshire. Drakelow was inhabited by Dame Wilmot Gresley, and so Gresley lived at Knypersley. He became High Sheriff of Staffordshire in 1759, serving out his year-long term of office. In 1765 he and his family moved from Knypersley to Worcester both to allow his children better access to education and to help Gresley lessen the weight of some debts, accrued from business ventures. He subsequently sold Knypersley via the Gresley's Estate Act 1767 (7 Geo. 3. c. 56 Pr.) in a further effort to combat his debts.

Gresley owned mines at Apedale in Staffordshire, and as an early patron of the engineer James Brindley he had him build a water engine for draining the mines there in 1752. Sir Nigel Gresley's Canal Act 1775 (15 Geo. 3. c. 16) was passed allowing Gresley and his son to build a private canal from Apedale to Newcastle-under-Lyme so that he could more easily transport the mine's products of coal and ironstone. The canal opened in 1776 and was named Sir Nigel Gresley's Canal; the act provided Gresley with a monopoly over coal in Newcastle, with all coal apart from that used for pottery coming from his mines and canal for a period of forty-two years. Mostly built on land already owned by Gresley, the project was profit-driven but also resulted in the price of coal being set at the same rate until the expiration of the act, greatly to the benefit of the local public.

Having moved at some point to Bath for health-related reasons, Gresley died there on 17 April 1787, possibly of dropsy, and was buried in Bath Abbey on 21 April. He was eulogised by Philip Thicknesse, who wrote that Gresley was "a kind husband, a tender father, a zealous friend, an hospitable neighbour. He was brave without boasting, and was just such a man as Sterne describes his uncle Toby, to whose kindness the weak would fly for protection". Gresley is also remembered by a plaque within Bath Abbey, and the Gresley Arms, a public house in Alsagers Bank, is named for him.

== Family ==
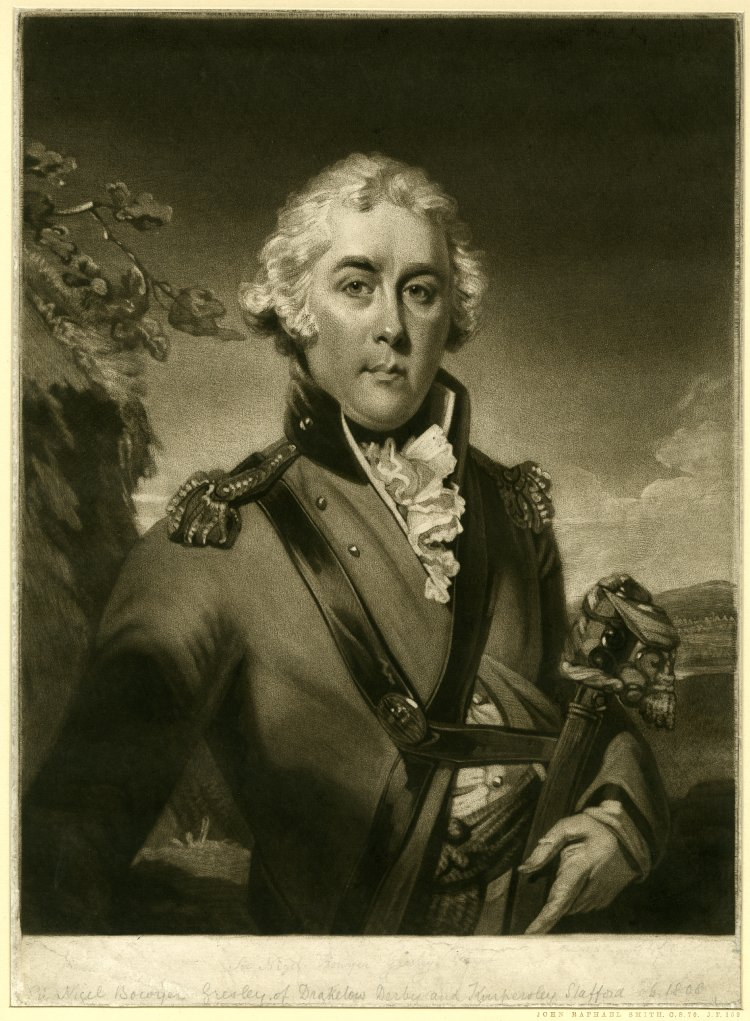
Sir Nigel Bowyer Gresley, 7th Baronet, son of Sir Nigel Gresley

Gresley married his cousin Elizabeth Wynn, the daughter of the Reverend Ellis Wynn of Congleton, on 18 May 1752. Together they had a son and seven daughters:

- Sir Nigel Bowyer Gresley, 7th Baronet (18 March 1753 – 26 March 1808)
- Dorothy Gresley (12 May 1754 – 1755)
- Anne Heathcote (11 May 1755–September 1797), married industrialist Sir John Edensor Heathcote
- Elizabeth Gresley (18 August 1756 – 10 April 1839)
- Frances Gresley (30 November 1757 – 30 September 1836)
- Louisa Jane Gresley (5 October 1759 – 20 April 1806), married the Reverend William Gresley
- Harriet Jelly (9 February 1761 – 25 May 1832), married the solicitor John Jelly
- Mary Susanna Proby (23 April 1762 – 1 November 1820), married the Reverend Baptist John Proby

== Sources ==
- Douglas, Hugh (1999). Flora MacDonald: The Most Loyal Rebel. Stroud, Gloucestershire: Alan Sutton. ISBN 0-7509-2098-X.
- Harrison, Cy (2019). Royal Navy Officers of the Seven Years War. Warwick, England: Helion. ISBN 978-1-912866-68-7.
- Hughes, Geoffrey (November 1996). "Railway and Canal Memorials" (PDF). Journal of the Railway & Canal Historical Society. 32 (3): 198.
- Lead, Lucy (July 2014). "'They flow for country and people': landowners and early canal development in England" (PDF). Journal of the Railway & Canal Historical Society. 38 (2): 73–89.
- Littler, W. A. (16 December 2021). "The Case of Anne Gresley". QJM: An International Journal of Medicine. 115 (3): 187–189. doi:10.1093/qjmed/hcab309.
- MacLeod, Ruairidh H. (1995). Flora MacDonald: The Jacobite Heroine in Scotland and North America. London: Shepheard-Walwyn. ISBN 0-85683-147-6.
- Madan, Falconer (1899). The Gresleys of Drakelowe (PDF). Oxford: Oxford University Press.
- Paget-Tomlinson, Edward (1978). The Complete Book of Canal & River Navigations. Albrighton, Wolverhampton: Waine Research. ISBN 0-905184-01-7.
- Priestley, Joseph (1831). Historical Account of the Navigable Rivers, Canals, and Railways, of Great Britain. London: Longman, Rees, Orme, Brown & Green.
- Winfield, Rif (2007). British Warships in the Age of Sail 1714–1792: Design, Construction, Careers and Fates. London: Pen & Sword. ISBN 978-1-84415-700-6.

Baronetage of England
Preceded by Thomas Gresley	Baronet (of Drakelowe); 1753–1787	Succeeded by Nigel Bowyer Gresley
Honorary titles
Preceded by Sir Richard Whitworth	High Sheriff of Staffordshire; 1759–1760	Succeeded by John Dolphin
