= Sir Nigel Gresley's Canal =

Former waterway in Staffordshire, UK

Coordinates: 53°1′19″N 2°14′2.2″W

- Interactive map of Sir Nigel Gresley's Canal

Specifications
- Locks: 0

History
- Original owner: Sir Nigel Gresley, 6th Baronet
- Date of act: 1775
- Date completed: 1776
- Date closed: 1857

Geography
- Start point: Apedale
- End point: Newcastle-under-Lyme

Sir Nigel Gresley's Canal (also known later in its life as Robert Heathcote's Canal) was a 3-mile (4.8 km) private canal between Apedale and Newcastle-under-Lyme both in Staffordshire, England.

== History ==
Sir Nigel Gresley's Canal Act 1775
- Act of Parliament
- Parliament of Great Britain
- Long title: An Act to enable Sir Nigel Gresley Baronet, and Nigel Bowyer Gresley Esquire, his Son, to make and maintain a navigable Cut or Canal, from certain Coal Mines in Apedale, to Newcastle under Lyne, in the County of Stafford.
- Citation: 15 Geo. 3. c. 16
- Territorial extent: Great Britain

Dates
- Royal assent: 13 April 1775
- Commencement: 29 November 1774 (Note: Start of session.)
Other legislation
| Amended by | Newcastle-under-Lyme Coal Supply Act 1812 |

Status: Amended

Text of statute as originally enacted

Sir Nigel Gresley inherited his baronetcy when his older brother Sir Thomas Gresley, the fifth baronet, died unexpectedly of smallpox on 23 December 1753. As Thomas had no children, the title passed to Sir Nigel, who became the sixth baronet. He thus inherited land near Apedale and Chesterton, where there were coal mines and ironstone mines. In 1752, he had employed the canal engineer James Brindley to build a water engine to drain some coal mines that he owned near Manchester.

With his son Nigel Bowyer Gresley, later the seventh baronet, he promoted the Sir Nigel Gresley's Canal Act 1775 (15 Geo. 3. c. 16), which gained royal assent on 13 April 1775. It authorised him to build 3 miles (4.8 km) of level canal from the mines at Apedale to a wharf in Newcastle-under-Lyme. It opened on an unknown date in 1776 and was used to transport coal from the mines to the town. The act placed controls on the price at which coal transported via the canal to Newcastle could be sold for the following 42 years. The canal was transferred to the ownership of Robert Edensor Heathcote in 1827. It closed around 1857.

Newcastle-under-Lyme Canal and Sir Nigel Bowyer Gresley's Canal Junction Act 1798
- Act of Parliament
- Parliament of Great Britain
- Long title: An act for making and maintaining a navigable canal, or canal and inclined plane or railway, from and out of the Newcastle-under-Lyme canal to the canal of sir Nigel Bowyer Gresley baronet, near the town of Newcastle-under-Lyme and also another branch of canal, or inclined plane or railway, from and out of the said last mentioned canal, at or near Apedale, to certain coal and other works, all in the county of Stafford.
- Citation: 38 Geo. 3. c. xxix
- Territorial extent: Great Britain

Dates
- Royal assent: 26 May 1798
- Commencement: 26 May 1798 (Note: The Acts of Parliament (Commencement) Act 1793.)
Other legislation
| Relates to | Sir Nigel Gresley's Canal Act 1775 |

Status: Current legislation

Text of statute as originally enacted

The canal joined the Newcastle-under-Lyme Junction Canal at a mill in Cross Heath, a site now occupied by a motorbike shop in Swift House on the A34 Liverpool Road. It then ran northwest to Milehouse, Chesterton and the Apedale mines. The Junction Canal was planned in turn to connect to the Newcastle-under-Lyme Canal via an inclined plane, but although approved in the Newcastle-under-Lyme Canal and Sir Nigel Bowyer Gresley's Canal Junction Act 1798 (38 Geo. 3. c. xxix) this was not built due to lack of money, thus the Sir Nigel Gresley's Canal remained severed from the main inland network and the Junction Canal became no more than an extension of the Gresley's Canal.

== See also ==
- Canals of the United Kingdom
- History of the British canal system

== Bibliography ==
- Baker, Allan C; Fell, Mike G (2009). Newcastle-under-Lyme Its Railway and Canal History. Irwell Press. ISBN 978-1-906919-13-9.
- Hadfield, Charles (1985). The Canals of The West Midlands (3rd ed.). Hewton Abbot, Devon: David & Charles. ISBN 0-7153-8644-1.
- Madan, Falconer (1899). The Gresleys of Drakelowe (PDF). Oxford: Oxford University Press.
- Priestley, Joseph (1831). "Historical Account of the Navigable Rivers, Canals and Railways of Great Britain". Archived from the original on 4 March 2016.
