= List of acts of the Parliament of Great Britain from 1767 =

This is a complete list of acts of the Parliament of Great Britain for the year 1767.

For acts passed until 1707, see the list of acts of the Parliament of England and the list of acts of the Parliament of Scotland. See also the list of acts of the Parliament of Ireland.

For acts passed from 1801 onwards, see the list of acts of the Parliament of the United Kingdom. For acts of the devolved parliaments and assemblies in the United Kingdom, see the list of acts of the Scottish Parliament, the list of acts of the Northern Ireland Assembly, and the list of acts and measures of Senedd Cymru; see also the list of acts of the Parliament of Northern Ireland.

The number shown after each act's title is its chapter number. Acts are cited using this number, preceded by the year(s) of the reign during which the relevant parliamentary session was held; thus the Union with Ireland Act 1800 is cited as "39 & 40 Geo. 3. c. 67", meaning the 67th act passed during the session that started in the 39th year of the reign of George III and which finished in the 40th year of that reign. Note that the modern convention is to use Arabic numerals in citations (thus "41 Geo. 3" rather than "41 Geo. III"). Acts of the last session of the Parliament of Great Britain and the first session of the Parliament of the United Kingdom are both cited as "41 Geo. 3".

Acts passed by the Parliament of Great Britain did not have a short title; however, some of these acts have subsequently been given a short title by acts of the Parliament of the United Kingdom (such as the Short Titles Act 1896).

Before the Acts of Parliament (Commencement) Act 1793 came into force on 8 April 1793, acts passed by the Parliament of Great Britain were deemed to have come into effect on the first day of the session in which they were passed. Because of this, the years given in the list below may in fact be the year before a particular act was passed.

== 7 Geo. 3 ==
Continuing the sixth session of the 12th Parliament of Great Britain, which met from 11 November 1766 until 2 July 1767.

This session was also traditionally cited as 7 G. 3.

=== Public acts ===
Short title	Citation	Royal assent
Long title
Public Companies Act 1767 (repealed)	7 Geo. 3. c. 48	29 June 1767
An Act for regulating the Proceedings of certain publick Companies and Corporations, carrying on Trade or Dealings with Joint Stocks, in respect to the declaring of Dividends; and for further regulating the Qualification of Members for voting in their respective General Courts. (Repealed by Statute Law Revision Act 1964 (c. 79))
East India Company Act 1767 (repealed)	7 Geo. 3. c. 49	29 June 1767
An Act for regulating certain Proceedings of the General Courts of the United Company of Merchants of England trading to The East Indies. (Repealed by Statute Law Revision Act 1887 (50 & 51 Vict. c. 59))
Post Office Offences and Isle of Man Postage Act 1767 (repealed)	7 Geo. 3. c. 50	29 June 1767
An Act for amending certain Laws relating to the Revenue of the Post Office; and for granting Rates of Postage for the Conveyance of Letters and Packets between Great Britain and The Isle of Man, and within that Island. (Repealed by Statute Law Revision Act 1888 (51 & 52 Vict. c. 3))
River Lee Navigation Act 1767 or the Lee Navigation Improvement Act 1767	7 Geo. 3. c. 51	29 June 1767
An Act for improving the Navigation of the River Lee, from the Town of Hertford, to the River Thames and for extending the said Navigation to the Flood Gates belonging to the Town Mill in the said Town of Hertford.
Saint Ives Harbour Act 1767 (repealed)	7 Geo. 3. c. 52	29 June 1767
An Act for erecting a proper and convenient Pier at the Port of Saint Ives, in the County of Cornwall, for the better Protection of Ships and Vessels resorting to the said Port. (Repealed by St. Ives Harbour Act 1853 (16 & 17 Vict. c. cxxix))
Bedford Level and Swaffham Drainage Act 1767 (repealed)	7 Geo. 3. c. 53	29 June 1767
An Act for draining and preserving Fen Lands and Low Grounds, lying in The south Level, Part of the Great Level of the Fens commonly called Bedford Level, and in the County of Cambridge, between the River com other wise Grant, West, and the Hard Lands of Bottisham, Swaffham Bulbeck, and Swaffham Prior, East; and for empowering the Governor, Bailiffs, and Commonalty, of the Company of Conservators of the Great Level of the Fens, commonly called Bedford Level, to sell certain Fen Lands, lying within the Limits aforesaid, commonly called Invested Lands. (Repealed by Swaffham Drainage Act 1853 (16 & 17 Vict. c. lxi))
Supply, etc. Act 1767 (repealed)	7 Geo. 3. c. 54	2 July 1767
An Act for granting to His Majesty a certain Sum of Money out of the Sinking Fund; and for applying certain Monies therein mentioned for the Service of the Year One Thousand Seven Hundred and Sixty Seven; and for farther appropriating the Supplies granted in this Session of Parliament; for carrying to the Aggregate Fund a Sum of Money which hath arisen by the Two Sevenths Excise; for empowering His Majesty, with the Advice of His Privy Council, to permit the Importation of any Sort of Corn or Grain, Duty-free, into this Kingdom, for a longer Time than is permitted by any Act of this Session of Parliament; and for obviating Doubts in relation to the Meeting of Commissioners for putting in Execution an Act of this Session, (Note: Land Tax (No. 2) Act 1766 (7 Geo. 3. c. 14)) for granting an Aid to His Majesty by a Land Tax. (Repealed by Statute Law Revision Act 1867 (30 & 31 Vict. c. 59))
Mutiny in America Act 1767 (repealed)	7 Geo. 3. c. 55	2 July 1767
An Act for further continuing an Act of the last Session of Parliament, (Note: Mutiny Act 1766 (6 Geo. 3. c. 8)) intituled, "An Act to amend and render more effectual, in His Majesty’s Dominions in America, an Act passed in this present Session of Parliament, (Note: Mutiny in America Act 1766 (6 Geo. 3. c. 18)) intituled, 'An Act for punishing Mutiny and Desertion; and for the better Payment of the Army and their Quarters.'" (Repealed by Statute Law Revision Act 1867 (30 & 31 Vict. c. 59))
Tea Act 1767 or the Indemnity Act 1767 (repealed)	7 Geo. 3. c. 56	2 July 1767
An Act for Taking Off the Inland Duty of One Shilling per Pound Weight upon All Black and Singlo Teas Consumed in Great Britain; and for Granting a Drawback upon the Exportation of Teas to Ireland and the British Dominions in America, for a Limited Time, upon Such Indemnification to Be Made in Respect Thereof by the East India Company, as Is Therein Mentioned; for Permitting the Exportation of Teas in Smaller Quantities Than One Lot to Ireland, or the Said Dominions in America; and for Preventing Teas Seized and Condemned from Being Consumed in Great Britain. (Repealed by Statute Law Revision Act 1867 (30 & 31 Vict. c. 59))
East India Company (No. 2) Act 1767 (repealed)	7 Geo. 3. c. 57	2 July 1767
An Act for establishing an Agreement for the Payment of the annual Sum of Four Hundred Thousand Pounds, for a limited Time, by the East India Company, in respect of the Territorial Acquisitions and Revenues lately obtained in The East Indies. (Repealed by Statute Law Revision Act 1867 (30 & 31 Vict. c. 59))
Customs Act 1767 (repealed)	7 Geo. 3. c. 58	2 July 1767
An Act for granting to His Majesty additional Duties on certain Foreign Linens imported into this Kingdom; and for establishing a Fund for the encouraging of the raising and dressing of Hemp and Flax. (Repealed by Statute Law Revision Act 1867 (30 & 31 Vict. c. 59))
Rebellion in America Act 1767 or New York Restraining Act 1767 (repealed)	7 Geo. 3. c. 59	2 July 1767
An Act for restraining and prohibiting the Governor, Council, and House of Representatives, of the Province of New York, until Provision shall have been made for furnishing the King’s Troops with all the Necessaries required by Law, from passing or assenting to any Act of Assembly, Vote, or Resolution, for any other Purpose. (Repealed by Statute Law Revision Act 1867 (30 & 31 Vict. c. 59))
Brecon Roads Act 1766 (repealed)	7 Geo. 3. c. 60	16 December 1766
An Act for repairing and widening several Roads in the County of Brecon. (Repealed by Roads in Brecon, Radnor and Glamorgan Act 1809 (49 Geo. 3. c. xiv))
Bucks Roads Act 1766 (repealed)	7 Geo. 3. c. 61	27 February 1767
An Act to enlarge the Term and Powers of Two Acts, passed in the Thirteenth Year of King George the First, (Note: Cranford to Maidenhead Road Act 1726 (13 Geo. 1. c. 31)) and the Seventeenth of His late Majesty, (Note: Maidenhead Road Act 1743 (17 Geo. 2. c. 19)) for repairing the Road from Cranford Bridge in the County of Middlesex, to that End of Maidenhead Bridge which lies in the County of Bucks; and for amending the Road from Slough to a certain Place in Eaton, and from Langley Broom to Datchet Bridge, in the County of Buckingham. (Repealed by Cranford Bridge and Maidenhead Bridge Road Act 1826 (7 Geo. 4. c. cxxxii))
Tiverton Roads Act 1766 (repealed)	7 Geo. 3. c. 62	27 February 1767
An Act to continue the Term, and render more effectual, an Act passed in the Thirty-first Year of His late Majesty, (Note: Tiverton Roads Act 1757 (31 Geo. 2. c. 49)) for amending several Roads leading from the Town of Tiverton, in the County of Devon; and for repairing and widening the Road from Bickley Bridge Cross, over Bickley Bridge, to the Sign of The Swan in the Town of Silverton, and also the Road from Bickley Wood Cross to Ford Village Water, in the said County. (Repealed by Tiverton Roads Act 1811 (51 Geo. 3. c. xlviii))
Swinford Bridge Act 1766 or the Eynsham Bridge Act 1766	7 Geo. 3. c. 63	27 February 1767
An Act for building a Bridge cross the River Thames, from Swynford in the County of Berks, to Eynsham in the County of Oxford.
Southwark Roads Act 1766 (repealed)	7 Geo. 3. c. 64	27 February 1767
An Act for enlarging the Term and Powers, granted by an Act passed in the Twenty-second Year of His late Majesty King George the Second, (Note: Southwark Roads Act 1748 (22 Geo. 2. c. 31)) for opening and making a new Road from the East End of New Street in the Parish of Saint John Southwark, to and through the several Places therein mentioned; and for keeping the said Road in Repair for the future; and for repairing several other Roads adjoining thereto. (Repealed by Roads in Bermondsey, Rotherhithe and Deptford Act 1823 (4 Geo. 4. c. lxxxiv) (Note: Incorrectly cited as "4 Geo. 4. c. clxxxiv" in the Chronological Table of the Statutes.))
Worcester Roads Act 1766 (repealed)	7 Geo. 3. c. 65	27 February 1767
An Act for continuing, altering, and amending, Two Acts of Parliament, of the Twelfth of King George the First, (Note: Worcester Roads Act 1725 (12 Geo. 1. c. 14)) and of the Tenth of His late Majesty, (Note: Worcester Roads Act 1736 (10 Geo. 2. c. 5)) for repairing several Roads leading into the City of Worcester; and for amending several other Roads near or adjoining thereto. (Repealed by Worcester (City) Roads Act 1816 (56 Geo. 3. c. xlvi) (Note: Incorrectly cited as "66 Geo. 3. c. xlvi" in the Chronological Table of the Statutes.))
Oxford and Fifield Road Act 1766 (repealed)	7 Geo. 3. c. 66	27 February 1767
An Act for repairing and widening the Road from the West End of Thames Street in the City of Oxford, over Botley Causeway, to the Turnpike Road near Fifield in the County of Berks. (Repealed by Oxford, Fifield and Witney Roads Act 1835 (5 & 6 Will. 4. c. ciii) (Note: Incorrectly cited as "5 & 6 Will. 4. c. xiii" in the Chronological Table of the Statutes.))
Hereford Roads Act 1766 (repealed)	7 Geo. 3. c. 67	27 February 1767
An Act for amending, repairing, and widening, several Roads in the Counties of Radnor and Hereford. (Repealed by Radnor and Hereford Roads Act 1804 (44 Geo. 3. c. xlviii) and Roads in Radnor, Hereford and Merioneth Act 1824 (5 Geo. 4. c. civ))
Worcester and Warwick Roads Act 1766	7 Geo. 3. c. 68	27 February 1767
An Act for amending and widening the Road leading from The Bell Inn at Northfield in the County of Worcester, to the Wootton Turnpike in the great Turnpike Road leading from Stratford upon Avon in the County of Warwick, to Birmingham in the same County.
St. Martin's Church, Worcester Act 1766	7 Geo. 3. c. 69	23 March 1767
An Act for re-building the Parish Church of Saint Martin, within the City of Worcester.
Kingston-upon-Hull Roads Act 1766 (repealed)	7 Geo. 3. c. 70	23 March 1767
An Act for enlarging the Term and Powers granted by an Act passed in the Eighteenth Year of His late Majesty, (Note: Kingston-upon-Hull Roads Act 1744 (18 Geo. 2. c. 4)) for repairing the Road from the Town of Kingston upon Hull, to and through the Town of Anlaby, and from thence to the Town of Kirk Ella, in the County of the said Town of Kingston upon Hull. (Repealed by Road from Kingston-upon-Hull to Kirk Ella Act 1829 (10 Geo. 4. c. xcii))
Hedon and Hull Road Act 1766 (repealed)	7 Geo. 3. c. 71	23 March 1767
An Act to enlarge the Term and Powers of an Act passed in the Eighteenth Year of King George the Second, (Note: Hedon and Hull Road Act 1744 (18 Geo. 2. c. 6)) for repairing the Road from Sacred Gate, on the South East Side of the Town of Hedon, in the East Riding of the County of York, through the said Town, to Hull North Bridge; and for amending the Road from the present Turnpike Bar in Wyton Holmes, through the Townships of Wyton and Sproatley, to the Guide Post in Flinton Lane near Humbleton Moor House, in the same Riding. (Repealed by Hendon and Hull and Wyton and Flinton Turnpike Roads Act 1855 (18 & 19 Vict. c. cxxxvi))
Queenborough (Poor Relief) Act 1766 (repealed)	7 Geo. 3. c. 72	23 March 1767
An Act for the better and more effectual Maintenance and Relief of the Poor of the Borough and Parish of Queenborough, in the County of Kent. (Repealed by Statute Law (Repeals) Act 2013 (c. 2))
Stonehouse Bridge Act 1766	7 Geo. 3. c. 73	23 March 1767
An Act for building a Bridge cross Stonehouse Creek, from Stonehouse to Plymouth Dock, in the County of Devon.
Rotherhithe Church Act 1766	7 Geo. 3. c. 74	23 March 1767
An Act for enlarging the Term and Powers granted by Two Acts of Parliament, of the Third of King George the First (Note: St. Mary Rotherhithe Act 1716 (3 Geo. 1. c. 5 Pr.)) and the Eleventh of His late Majesty, (Note: Rotherhithe Church Act 1737 (11 Geo. 2. c. 13)) for enabling the Parishioners of Saint Mary Rotherhith, in the County of Surry, by certain Funeral Rates, therein mentioned, to finish the said Parish Church, and for purchasing an additional Burial Ground; and to enable them to raise Money for purchasing the present Parsonage House, and converting the Site thereof into a Burial Ground, and for providing a new Parsonage House.
Ealing Roads Act 1766 (repealed)	7 Geo. 3. c. 75	23 March 1767
An Act for the more effectual repairing, widening, and rendering commodious, the Highways within the Parish of Ealing; in the County of Middlesex; and for lighting the Street in Old Brentford, within the said Parish, from the Turning towards Kew Bridge to a Street called The Half Acre. (Repealed by Ealing Highways Act 1874 (37 & 38 Vict. c. clxxvii))
Norfolk Roads Act 1766 (repealed)	7 Geo. 3. c. 76	23 March 1767
An Act for continuing the Term of several Acts, for repairing the Road between Wymondham and Attleborough in the County of Norfolk; and for amending the Road from the End of the Town Close in the County of the City of Norwich, to the Chalk Pits near Thetford in the said County of Norfolk. (Repealed by Norwich and Thetford Road Act 1816 (56 Geo. 3. c. lxviii) and Annual Turnpike Acts Continuance Act 1869 (32 & 33 Vict. c. 90))
Warwick Roads Act 1766 (repealed)	7 Geo. 3. c. 77	23 March 1767
An Act for repairing and widening the Road from Spernal Ash in the County of Warwick, through Studley, to a Street called Digbeth, in the Town of Birmingham. (Repealed by Spernal Ash and Birmingham Road Act 1828 (9 Geo. 4. c. xxxiv))
Lincoln and Notts Roads Act 1766 (repealed)	7 Geo. 3. c. 78	3 April 1767
An Act for continuing and enlarging the Term and Powers of so much of Two Acts, made in the Twelfth Year of the Reign of King George the First, (Note: Foston Bridge and Witham Common Road Act 1725 (12 Geo. 1. c. 16)) and in the Twelfth Year of the Reign of King George the Second, (Note: Lincoln and Nottinghamshire Roads Act 1738 (12 Geo. 2. c. 34)) for repairing the Road from Spittlegate Hill near Grantham in the County of Lincoln, to Little Drayton in the County of Nottingham, as relates to the Road leading from Foston Bridge in the County of Lincoln, to Little Drayton in the County of Nottingham. (Repealed by Foston Bridge and Little Drayton Road Act 1799 (39 Geo. 3. c. xxvi))
Lincoln and Notts Roads (No. 2) Act 1766 (repealed)	7 Geo. 3. c. 79	3 April 1767
An Act for continuing and enlarging the Term and Powers of so much of an Act, made in the Thirty-second Year of the Reign of His late Majesty King George the Second, (Note: Lincoln and Nottingham Roads Act 1758 (32 Geo. 2. c. 53)) for repairing and widening the Roads from Grantham in the County of Lincoln, through Bottesford and Bingham, to Nottingham Trent Bridge, and from Chappel Bar near the West End of the Town of Nottingham to Saint Mary’s Bridge in the Town of Derby, and from the Guide Post in the Parish of Lenton to Sawley Ferry, as relates to the Road leading from Grantham to Nottingham Trent Bridge. (Repealed by Road from Grantham to Nottingham Trent Bridge Act 1825 (6 Geo. 4. c. xxiv))
Liverpool Churches Act 1766	7 Geo. 3. c. 80	3 April 1767
An Act for enlarging the Term and Powers, granted by an Act of the Second Year of the Reign of His present Majesty, (Note: Liverpool (Improvement) Act 1762 (2 Geo. 3. c. 68)) for erecting and building Two new Churches, and providing Burial Places, in the Town and Parish of Liverpoole, in the County Palatine of Lancaster.
Warwick and Worcester Roads Act 1766	7 Geo. 3. c. 81	3 April 1767
An Act for repairing and widening the Road from the Turnpike Road at Hatton near the Borough of Warwick through King's Norton in the County of Worcester, and to the upper End of Gannow Green in the Parish of Bromsgrove, and to The Bell Inn in the Parish of Bell Broughton in the said County of Worcester.
Dorset and Somerset Roads Act 1766	7 Geo. 3. c. 82	3 April 1767
An Act to explain, alter, and amend, an Act (Note: Dorset and Somerset Roads Act 1765 (5 Geo. 3. c. 102)) for repairing and widening several Roads leading from between the Second and Third Mile Stones on the Turnpike Road between the Town and County of Poole and Winborn Minster in the County of Dorset, to Bratton Corner in the County of Somerset; and for repairing and widening the Road from the Turnpike Road in Brainston, to or near a House called Fontleroy's Farm House in the County of Dorset.
Cumberland Roads Act 1766	7 Geo. 3. c. 83	20 May 1767
An Act for repairing and widening the Road from Shaddon Gate near Carlisle to the present Turnpike Road between Binsey Mires and North Raw Gate, to join the Turnpike Road at Skillbeck in the County of Cumberland.
Kent and Sussex Roads Act 1766 (repealed)	7 Geo. 3. c. 84	3 April 1767
An Act for repairing the Roads from Tunbridge Wells in the County of Kent, to Swift's Den in the Parish of Etchingham, and from Frant to Possingworth Great Wood adjoining to the Turnpike Road there leading to Blackboys in the County of Sussex. (Repealed by Tunbridge Wells Roads Act 1808 (48 Geo. 3. c. lxviii) and Tunbridge Wells, Wadhurst and Mayfield Roads Act 1829 (10 Geo. 4. c. lvii))
Saint Botolph, Aldgate (Improvement) Act 1766 (repealed)	7 Geo. 3. c. 85	15 April 1767
An Act for paving the Streets and other Places in that Part of the Parish of Saint Botolph Aldgate which lies in the County of Middlesex, and Part of a Street called East Smithfield in the Precinct of Saint Catherine; and for cleansing, lighting, and watching, the same; and preventing Obstructions and Annoyances therein. (Repealed by St. Botolph Aldgate and East Smithfield Improvement Act 1807 (47 Geo. 3 Sess. 2. c. xxxviii))
Kent and Sussex Roads (No. 2) Act 1766 (repealed)	7 Geo. 3. c. 86	15 April 1767
An Act for repairing, widening, and keeping in Repair, the Road leading from the High Road between Bromley and Farnborough in the County of Kent, to Beggar’s Bush in the Turnpike Road leading from Tunbridge Wells to Maresfield, in the County of Sussex. (Repealed by Junction Road between Bromley and Farnborough Road and Tunbridge Wells and Maresfield Road Act 1831 (1 Will. 4. c. xlv))
River Itching Navigation Act 1766	7 Geo. 3. c. 87	15 April 1767
An Act to explain, amend, and render more effectual, an Act made in the Sixteenth and Seventeenth Years of King Charles the Second, intituled, "An Act for making divers Rivers navigable, or otherwise passable, for Boats, Barges, and other Vessels," (Note: River Navigation Act 1664 (16 & 17 Cha. 2. c. 13 Pr.)) so far as the same relates to the River Itching, running from Alresford, through Winchester, to the Sea near Southampton; and for better regulating the said Navigation.
Middlesex Roads Act 1766 (repealed)	7 Geo. 3. c. 88	15 April 1767
An Act to continue and render more effectual several Acts of Parliament, for repairing the Highways from that Part of Counter's Bridge which lies in the Parish of Kensington, in the County of Middlesex, leading through the Towns of Brentford and Hounslow, to the Powder Mills m the Road to Staines, and to Cranford Bridge, in the said County, in the Road to Colnbrook; and for repairing, turning, or altering, the Highway leading from the said Road, at or near the End of Ston Lane, to the Town of Isleworth in the said County, and from thence to a Gate on the South Side of Tedington Field; and also the Highway leading out of the said Great Road near Smalberry Green Turnpike, to a House known by the Sign of The George in the Town of Isleworth aforesaid; and for lighting and watering Part of the said Highways. (Repealed by Metropolis Roads Act 1826 (7 Geo. 4. c. cxlii))
Bridlington Roads Act 1766	7 Geo. 3. c. 89	15 April 1767
An Act to repair and widen the Road from Whitecross to the Town of Bridlington, in the East Riding of the County of York.
Borrowstouness Beer Duties Act 1766 (repealed)	7 Geo. 3. c. 90	15 April 1767
An Act for continuing the Duty of Two Pennies Scots, or a Sixth Part of a Penny Sterling, upon every Scots Pint of Ale and Beer, which shall be brewed for Sale, brought into, tapped, or sold, within the Town of Burrowstounness and Liberties thereof, in the County of Linlithgow; and for extending the same over the Parish of Burrowstounness; for repairing the Harbour of the said Town; and for other Purposes therein mentioned. (Repealed by Borrowstouness Town and Harbour Act 1843 (6 & 7 Vict. c. lxix))
Kent Roads Act 1766 (repealed)	7 Geo. 3. c. 91	15 April 1767
An Act for repairing and widening the Road from the Brick Kilns on East Malling Heath to the Turnpike Road on Pembury Green, and from Brand Bridges to The Four Wents near Matfield Green, in the County of Kent. (Repealed by East Malling Heath and Mereworth and Hadlow Road Act 1829 (10 Geo. 4. c. lvi) (Note: Incorrectly cited as "1 Geo. 3. c. lvi" in the Chronological Table of the Statutes.))
Roads from Whitchurch and Hinstock Act 1766 (repealed)	7 Geo. 3. c. 92	15 April 1767
An Act to repair and widen the Roads from Whitchurch in the County of Salop, to the Turnpike Road (Note: The junction of the A525 Keele Road/A531 Crewe Road in Madeley Heath, Staffordshire (the former Newcastle-under-Lyme to Nantwich turnpike road) with the A525 Newcastle Road to Whitchurch. 53°00′26″N 2°19′23″W) between Nantwich in the County of Chester and Newcastle under Line, and from Hinstock (Note: Hinstock, Shropshire.) to Nantwich aforesaid. (Repealed by Roads from Whitchurch (Salop.) and from Hinstock Act 1824 (5 Geo. 4. c. xxxii))
River Ure Navigation Act 1766 (repealed)	7 Geo. 3. c. 93	15 April 1767
An Act for making navigable the River Ure, from its Junction with the River Swale to the Borough of Ripon, in the County of York. (Repealed by River Ure Navigation to Ripon Act 1820 (1 Geo. 4. c. xxxv))
Yorks and Chester Roads Act 1766	7 Geo. 3. c. 94	20 May 1767
An Act for enlarging the Term and Powers of an Act, made in the Fourteenth Year of the Reign of His late Majesty, intituled, "An Act for repairing the Road from Doncaster, through the Parish of Pension in the County of York, to Salter's Brook in the County of Chester; and also the Road from Rotherham in the said County of York, to Hartcliffe Hill in the said Parish of Peniston;" (Note: Doncaster to Salter's Brook Road Act 1740 (14 Geo. 2. c. 31)) and for making the said Act more effectual, so far as the same relates to the said Road between Rotheram and Hartcliffe Hill.
Codbreck Brook Navigation Act 1766	7 Geo. 3. c. 95	20 May 1767
An Act for making navigable a Brook called Codbeck, from the River Swale to the Borough of Thus, in the County of York.
River Ouse Navigation Act 1766	7 Geo. 3. c. 96	15 April 1767
An Act for making navigable the River Ouze, from below Widdington Ings, at or near Linton, to the Junction of the Rivers Swale and Ure; and for making navigable the said River Swale from the said Junction to Morton Bridge, and also the Brook running from Bedale into the River Swale, in the County of York.
River Hull and Frodingham Beck Navigation Act 1766	7 Geo. 3. c. 97	20 May 1767
An Act for improving the Navigation of the River Hull and Frodingham Beck, from Ake Beck Mouth to The Clough on the East Corner of Fisholme; and for extending the said Navigation from the said Clough into or near the Town of Great Driffield, in the East Riding of the County of York.
River Ancholme Navigation and Drainage Act 1766	7 Geo. 3. c. 98	20 May 1767
An Act for the more effectual draining the Lands lying in the Level of Ancholme in the County of Lincoln, and making the River Ancholme navigable from the River Humber at or near a Place called Ferraby Sluice in the County of Lincoln, to the Town of Glemford Briggs; and for continuing the said Navigation up or near to the said River, from thence to Bishop Briggs, in the said County of Lincoln.
Addenbrooke's Hospital Act 1767 or the Addenbrooke's Hospital, Cambridge Act 1767 (repealed)	7 Geo. 3. c. 99	20 May 1767
An Act for establishing and well-governing a General Hospital, to be called Addenbrooke's Hospital, in the Town of Cambridge. (Repealed by Statute Law (Repeals) Act 2013 (c. 2))
Isle of Ely and Norfolk Roads Act 1766 (repealed)	7 Geo. 3. c. 100	20 May 1767
An Act to amend an Act, made in the Fifth Year of His present Majesty, (Note: Huntingdon Roads Act 1765 (5 Geo. 3. c. 53)) for amending the Road from Chatteris Ferry, (Note: Chatteris Ferry, on the Chatteris Road. 52°25′47″N 0°01′59″E) through Chatteris and March, to Wisbech Saint Peter's, (Note: Wisbech, Cambridgeshire.) and from thence to Tide Gate in the Isle of Ely, and from Wisbech aforesaid, through Outwell, to Downham Bridge in the County of Norfolk; and for repealing the several Acts for repairing the said Road between Wisbech and March; and also for charging certain Lands in Waldersea and on Wisbech South Side towards the Repairs of the Waldersea and South Side Banks, which, before the passing of the said Act, were liable to such Repairs. (Repealed by Chatteris Ferry and Downham Bridge Road Act 1828 (9 Geo. 4. c. lxxiii))
Kensington, Chelsea and Fulham (Improvements) Act 1766	7 Geo. 3. c. 101	29 June 1767
An Act to continue and render more effectual several Acts of Parliament, for repairing the Roads in the Parishes of Kensington, Chelsea, and Fulham, and other Parishes therein mentioned, in the County of Middlesex, and for lighting and watering the said Roads; and for paving the Street and Highway, and Footways, in Kensington; and for lighting and watching the same, and the Courts and Alleys adjoining thereto.
Tyburn and Uxbridge Road Act 1766 (repealed)	7 Geo. 3. c. 102	20 May 1767
An Act to continue and render more effectual Three Acts, (Note: Repair of Highways between Tyburn and Uxbridge Act 1715 (1 Geo. 1. St. 2. c. 25 Pr.)) (Note: Tyburn and Uxbridge Road Act 1725 (12 Geo. 1. c. 17)) (Note: Middlesex Roads Act 1741 (15 Geo. 2. c. 9)) for repairing the Highways between Tyburn and Uxbridge in the County of Middlesex; and for amending the Road leading from Brent Bridge, over Hanwell Heath, through the Parishes of Hanwell, New Brentford, and Ealing, to the Great Western Road in the said County; and for lighting, watching, and watering, the Highway between Tyburn and Kensington Gravel Pits. (Repealed by Roads between Tyburn and Uxbridge Act 1826 (7 Geo. 4. c. lxxvi))
Tenterden &c. Road Act 1766 (repealed)	7 Geo. 3. c. 103	20 May 1767
An Act for repairing and widening, the Road leading from the Turnpike Road in the Town of Tenterden to and over Bull Green, and to and through the Town of Great Chart, to a House known by the Sign of The Castle, at the Entrance of the Town of Ashford, in the County of Kent, and also the Road leading from Bull Green aforesaid to Hotfield Heath, and also the Road leading from Bull Green aforesaid, through High Halden, to Dashmanden, in the Parish of Biddenden, in the said County of Kent. (Repealed by Tenterden and Ashford Road Act 1819 (59 Geo. 3. c. xcvii) and Annual Turnpike Acts Continuance Act 1877 (40 & 41 Vict. c. 64))
Denbigh, Flint, Salop and Chester Roads Act 1766 (repealed)	7 Geo. 3. c. 104	20 May 1767
An Act for repairing and widening the Road from Marchwiel in the County of Denbigh through Bangor, Worthenbury, and Hanmer, in the County of Flint, to a House in the Possession of Thomas Jenks in Dodington in the Parish of Whitchurch in the County of Salop; and from Bangor aforesaid to Malpas in the County of Chester; and from Redbrook to Hampton in the said County of Salop. (Repealed by Marchwiel and Whitchurch (Salop.), Bangor and Malpas, and Redbrook and Hampton Roads Act 1830 (1 Will. 4. c. ii))
Bethnal Green Road Act 1766 (repealed)	7 Geo. 3. c. 105	20 May 1767
An Act to enlarge the Term and Powers of an Act, made in the Twenty-ninth Year of King George the Second, (Note: Bethnal Green Road Act 1756 (29 Geo. 2. c. 43)) for making a Road from the East Side of the Parish of Saint Mathew Bethnal Green in the County of Middlesex, to the East End of Church Street; and to open a Way into Shoreditch; and for repairing, paving, and regulating, Old Cock-Lane, New Cock-Lane, Church Street, and the Road on the West Side of the Opening into Shoreditch; and for removing Nuisances and Obstructions there from, and preventing the same for the future. (Repealed by Bethnal Green Road Act 1805 (45 Geo. 3. c. vi) and Statute Law (Repeals) Act 2013 (c. 2))
Ayr Roads Act 1767 (repealed)	7 Geo. 3. c. 106	29 June 1767
An Act for repairing and widening several Roads leading from the Town of Ayr, and other Roads therein mentioned, in the County of Ayr. (Repealed by Ayr (County) Turnpike Roads Act 1805 (45 Geo. 3. c. xxviii))

=== Private acts ===
Short title	Citation	Royal assent
Long title
Starkie's Estate Act 1767	7 Geo. 3. c. 26 Pr.	23 March 1767
An Act to enable the Devisees for Life, named in the Will of Pierce Starkie Esquire deceased, and Trustees, to cut down and sell Timber upon the Freehold and Copyhold or Customary Estates late of the said Pierce Starkie, in the Counties of York and Lancaster; and to grant Leases of the Quarries, Mines, and Minerals, within the Freehold Estates late of the said Pierce Starkie, in the same Counties; and to invest the Monies arising therefrom in the Purchase of Lands and Hereditaments, to be settled to the Uses of the said Will.
Purleigh Rectory (Essex) Act 1767	7 Geo. 3. c. 27 Pr.	23 March 1767
An Act for annexing the Rectory of Purleigh, in the County of Essex, to the Office of Provost of the House of The Blessed Mary the Virgin, in Oxford, commonly called Oriel College, of the Foundation of Edward the Second, of Famous Memory, sometime King of England.
Vesting in Durham dean and chapter grounds adjoining Southshields (Durham) and for providing compensation to the curate of St. Hild's chapel for the same, and to enable the dean and chapter to move fairs and markets out of Southshields and onto said ground.	7 Geo. 3. c. 28 Pr.	23 March 1767
An Act for vesting in the Dean and Chapter of Durham a certain Piece of Ground adjoining to the Town of South Shields, in the County Palatine of Durham; and for making an adequate Compensation to the Curate of the Chapel of Saint Hilds, in the said County, and his Successors, for the same; and for enabling the said. Dean and Chapter to remove the Fairs and Markets out of the Town of South Shields, and to cause the same to be held on the said Piece of Ground.
Bibury Inclosure Act 1767	7 Geo. 3. c. 29 Pr.	23 March 1767
An Act for dividing and enclosing the Open and Common Fields and Commonable Places within the Parish of Bibury, and Manors of Bibury Ossney and Bibury Northumberland, and the Hamlet or Vill of Arlington, all in the said Parish of Bibury, in the County of Gloucester.
Cosgrove Inclosure Act 1767	7 Geo. 3. c. 30 Pr.	23 March 1767
An Act for dividing and enclosing the Open and Common Fields, Common Meadows, Common Pastures, Common Grounds, and Commonable Lands, within the Township and Liberties of Cosgrave, in the County of Northampton (exclusive of Brownswood Green and Kenson Field, in the Parish of Cosgrave in the said County.)
Nun Monkton Inclosure Act 1767	7 Geo. 3. c. 31 Pr.	23 March 1767
An Act for dividing and enclosing the several Open Fields, Meadows, and Pasture Grounds, within the Manor and Township of Nun Monkton, in the West Riding of the County of York.
Olney Inclosure Act 1767	7 Geo. 3. c. 32 Pr.	23 March 1767
An Act for dividing and enclosing the several Open and Common Fields and Commonable Lands within the Parish of Olney, in the County of Bucks.
Bishop Burton Inclosure Act 1767	7 Geo. 3. c. 33 Pr.	23 March 1767
An Act for dividing and enclosing several Lands and Grounds in the Parish of South Burton, otherwise Bishop Burton, in the East Riding of the County of York.
Ruddington Inclosure Act 1767	7 Geo. 3. c. 34 Pr.	23 March 1767
An Act for dividing and enclosing the Open Fields, Meadows, Common Pastures, and all other Commonable Lands, within the Liberties of Ruddington, in the County of Nottingham.
Wixford, Exhall, King's-Broom, and Brunell's Broom (Warwickshire) Inclosure Act 1767	7 Geo. 3. c. 35 Pr.	23 March 1767
An Act for dividing and enclosing the Open and Common Fields, Common Meadows, and Commonable Lands, within the Hamlets or Townships of Wixford, Exhall, King's Broom, and Burnell's Brooom, in the County of Warwick.
Lenton and Radford Inclosure Act 1767 (repealed)	7 Geo. 3. c. 36 Pr.	23 March 1767
An Act for dividing and enclosing the Open Fields, Meadows, Common Pastures, and Commonable Lands, lying South of the Turnpike Road leading from Nottingham to Alfreton, within the Liberties and Townships of Lenton and Radford, in the County of Nottingham. (Repealed by Statute Law (Repeals) Act 1995 (c. 44))
Benwick (Cambridgeshire) Drainage Act 1767	7 Geo. 3. c. 37 Pr.	23 March 1767
An Act for the more effectual draining and preserving certain Fen Lands and Low Grounds, in the Hamlet of Benwick, in the Parish of Doddington, Whutlesey, Ramsey, and Farcet, in the Isle of Ely, and Counties of Cambridge and Huntingdon.
Cubbington Inclosure Act 1767	7 Geo. 3. c. 38 Pr.	23 March 1767
An Act for dividing and enclosing the several Open and Common Fields, Common Meadows, and other Commonable Lands, in the Parish of Cubbington, in the County of Warwick.
Leigh Inclosure Act 1767	7 Geo. 3. c. 39 Pr.	23 March 1767
An Act for enclosing, allotting, and dividing, the Commons and Waste Grounds, Open Common Field, and Open Meadow Grounds, in the Manor of The Leigh, in the Parish of Ashen Keynes, in the County of Wilts.
Adlingfleet and Whitgift Drainage Act 1767	7 Geo. 3. c. 40 Pr.	23 March 1767
An Act for draining and preserving certain Low Grounds in the Parishes of Adlingfleet and Whitgift, in the West Riding of the County of York.
Bennet's Name Act 1767	7 Geo. 3. c. 41 Pr.	23 March 1767
An Act to enable Richard Bennett Esquire and his Issue to take and bear the Surname and Arms of Coffin, pursuant to the Will of Richard Coffin Esquire, deceased.
Will's Name and Arms Act 1767	7 Geo. 3. c. 42 Pr.	23 March 1767
An Act to enable Thomas Willis Esquire (lately called Thomas Swettenham) and his Issue to take, use, and bear, the Surname and Arms of Willis pursuant to the Will of Daniel Willis Esquire, deceased.
Naturalization of Leonard Meyer and Lewis Giles Act 1767	7 Geo. 3. c. 43 Pr.	23 March 1767
An Act for naturalizing Leonard Meyer and Lewis Giles.
Confirming a contract between Charles Duke of Queensberry and Dover, on one part, and Patrick and James Crawford and Gilbert Meason on the other and enabling the Duke and heirs to grant leases in terms of said contract.	7 Geo. 3. c. 44 Pr.	3 April 1767
An Act for confirming a Contract of Lease of Mines, between Charles Duke of Queensberry and Dover of the one Part, and Patrick Crawfurd, James Crawford, and Gilbert Meason, of the other Part; and for enabling the said Duke and his Heirs of Entail, to grant Leases in Terms of the said Contract.
Skipton Inclosure Act 1767	7 Geo. 3. c. 45 Pr.	3 April 1767
An Act for dividing and enclosing a certain Common called The Tarn Moor, in the Township of Skipton, in the West Riding of the County of York; and for applying the Produce thereof towards the Relief of the Poor of the said Parish.
Bishop Soil Inclosure Act 1767	7 Geo. 3. c. 46 Pr.	3 April 1767
An Act for dividing, enclosing, and draining, a Parcel of Waste Ground, or Common, called Bishop Soil, in the several Parishes of Howden and Eastrington, and in the Parish or Parochial Chapelry of Blacktoft in the East Riding of the County of York.
North Anston and Todwick (Yorkshire) Inclosure Act 1767	7 Geo. 3. c. 47 Pr.	3 April 1767
An Act for dividing and enclosing several Open Fields, Commons, Moor, or Waste Grounds, within the Manors of North Anston and Todwick, in the County of York.
Layton in Poulton and Bishpam (Lancashire) Inclosure Act 1767	7 Geo. 3. c. 48 Pr.	3 April 1767
An Act for dividing and enclosing the Common Waste Grounds and Sand Hills called Layton Howes, within the Manor of Layton, in the Parishes of Paulton and Bispham, in the County Palatine of Lancaster.
Carlton in Lindrick (Nottinghamshire) Inclosure Act 1767	7 Geo. 3. c. 49 Pr.	3 April 1767
An Act for dividing and enclosing certain Open Fields, Meadows, and Stinted Pastures, in the Parish of Carlton in Lindrick, in the County of Nottingham.
Cosby and Littlethorpe (Leicestershire) Inclosure Act 1767	7 Geo. 3. c. 50 Pr.	3 April 1767
An Act for dividing and enclosing the Open Fields and Commonable Places in Cosby and Littlethorpe, in the Parish of Cosby, in the County of Leicester.
Huggate Inclosure Act 1767	7 Geo. 3. c. 51 Pr.	3 April 1767
An Act for dividing and enclosing several Open Fields, Common Pastures, and Parcels of Land and Grounds, within the Manor and Township of Huggate, in the East Riding of the County of York.
Earl and Countess of Strathmore and Kinghorne: licence to use the name Bowes, only, pursuant to their marriage settlement and the will of George Bowes.	7 Geo. 3. c. 52 Pr.	3 April 1767
An Act to enable John Bowes Earl of Strathmore and Kinghorne and Mary Eleanor Bowes Countess of Strathmore and Kinghorne his Wife, the Daughter and only Child of George Bowes Esquire, deceased, to take and use the Surname of Bowes only, pursuant to his Will, and the Settlement executed previous to the Marriage of the said Earl and Countess.
Vacating an agreement made on 10 July 1758 between William Duke of Portland, Margaret Cavendishe Duchess of Portland and Thomas Foley concerning a building lease of land in Marybone (Middlesex) and to establish and render effectual another made on 30 January 1767, concerning the premises.	7 Geo. 3. c. 53 Pr.	15 April 1767
An Act to vacate an Agreement, made the Tenth Day of July One Thousand Seven Hundred and Fifty-eight, between the most Noble William late Duke of Portland deceased, and Margaret Cavendish Dutchess of Portland, then his Wise and now his Widow, and the Right Honourable Thomas Lord Foley, also deceased, concerning a Building Lease, to be granted to the said Lord Foley, of a Parcel of Land in the Parish of Marybone, in the County of Middlesex; and to establish and render effectual another Agreement, dated the Thirtieth Day of January One Thousand Seven Hundred and Sixty-seven, concerning the Premises.
Duke of Buccleugh's Estate Act 1767	7 Geo. 3. c. 54 Pr.	15 April 1767
An Act to enable Henry Duke of Buccleugh, a Minor, to make a Settlement on his intended Marriage with the Lady Elizabeth Montagu.
Earl of Abingdon's Estate Act 1767	7 Geo. 3. c. 55 Pr.	15 April 1767
An Act for exchanging Part of the settled Estates of Willoughby Earl of Abingdon, in the County of Wilts, for another Estate, of greater Value, in the County of Berks, to be settled, in Lieu thereof; and for other Purposes therein mentioned.
Gresley's Estate Act 1767	7 Geo. 3. c. 56 Pr.	15 April 1767
An Act for vesting Part of the Estate of Sir Nigel Gresley Baronet, (Note: Sir Nigel Gresley, 6th Baronet.) in the County of Stafford, in Trustees, to be sold, to raise Money for the Payment of Debts, and other Purposes therein mentioned.
John Bennett's and Ann Spencer's undivided estates in Surrey, Kent and Middlesex: vesting in trustees to effect a partition between their devisees.	7 Geo. 3. c. 57 Pr.	15 April 1767
An Act for vesting several undivided Estates, late of John Bennett Esquire deceased and Ann Spencer Widow, in the Counties of Surrey, Kent, and Middlesex, in Trustees, in order to effect a Partition between the said Ann Spencer and the Devisees named in the Will of the said John Bennett.
Vernon's Estate Act 1767	7 Geo. 3. c. 58 Pr.	15 April 1767
An Act for confirming a Lease, or Grant, made by the Honourable Louisa Barbara Mansell, sole Daughter and Heir of the Right Honourable Buffy Lord Mansell deceased (now the Honourable Louisa Barbara Vernon, Wife of the Honourable George Venables Vernon) to Chauncy Townshend Esquire, for certain Purposes therein expressed, or to grant a new Lease thereof.
Hesketh's Estate Act 1767	7 Geo. 3. c. 59 Pr.	15 April 1767
An Act for vesting Part of the Estates, in the County Palatine of Lancaster, settled upon the Marriage of Fleetwood Hesketh Esquire with Frances his Wife, in Trustees, to be sold; and for applying the Money arising from such Sale in paying off divers Debts and Encumbrances affecting the same; and for other Purposes therein mentioned; and also for substituting, in Lieu thereof, a certain Estate in the said County called Burne, lately purchased by the said Fleetwood Hesketh.
Talbot's Estate Act 1767	7 Geo. 3. c. 60 Pr.	15 April 1767
An Act for vesting Part of the Estate of John Talbot the Younger Esquire, settled on his Marriage, in Trustees, for raising a further Sum of Money, for discharging Debts and Encumbrances.
Newton Inclosure Act 1767	7 Geo. 3. c. 61 Pr.	15 April 1767
An Act for dividing and enclosing several Open and Common Fields, Meadows, and Commonable Grounds, within the Manor and Parish of Newton, in the County of Lincoln.
Donington Inclosure Act 1767	7 Geo. 3. c. 62 Pr.	15 April 1767
An Act for dividing and enclosing several Open Fields, Meadows, Common Fens, and other Commonable Places, within the Parish of Donington, in the County of Lincoln; and for draining and improving the same.
Wootton Inclosure Act 1767	7 Geo. 3. c. 63 Pr.	15 April 1767
An Act for dividing and enclosing certain Open Lands and Grounds, in the Parish of Wootton, in the County of Lincoln.
Langton and Woodall (Lincolnshire) Inclosure Act 1767	7 Geo. 3. c. 64 Pr.	15 April 1767
An Act for dividing and enclosing certain Open Arable Fields, Moors, and Commons, in the Parishes of Langton and Woodall, in the County of Lincoln.
Ailestone Inclosure Act 1767	7 Geo. 3. c. 65 Pr.	15 April 1767
An Act for dividing and enclosing certain Open Common Fields and Unenclosed Meadows in the Parish of Ailestone, in the County of Leicester.
Shalstone Inclosure Act 1767	7 Geo. 3. c. 66 Pr.	15 April 1767
An Act for dividing and enclosing the Open and Common Fields, Common Pastures, Common Grounds, Waste Grounds, and Commonable Lands, within the Manor, Parish, and Liberties, of Shalstone, in the County of Bucks.
Willis's Name Act 1767	7 Geo. 3. c. 67 Pr.	15 April 1767
An Act to enable John Fleming Esquire, lately called John Willis, and his Issue, to take and use the Surname and Arms of Fleming only, pursuant to a Settlement made by Richard Fleming Esquire, deceased.
Earl of Scarborough's Estate Act 1767	7 Geo. 3. c. 68 Pr.	20 May 1767
An Act for discharging divers Manors, Rectory, Messages, Lands, and, Hereditaments, Part of the Estate of the Right Honourable Richard Earl of Scarbrough, by him settled on his Marriage with the Right Honourable Barbara Countess of Scarbrough, from the Uses and Trusts of the said Settlement; and for settling other Manors, Lands, and Tenements, of greater Value, in Lieu thereof, to the like Uses.
Dyke's Estates Act 1767	7 Geo. 3. c. 69 Pr.	20 May 1767
An Act for vesting Part of the settled Estates of Sir John Dixon Dyke Baronet, lying in the Counties of Oxford, Sussex, and Kent, in Trustees, in Trust to be sold, for railing Money to discharge a Mortgage Debt affecting other Parts of the said settled Estates.
Hill's Estate Act 1767	7 Geo. 3. c. 70 Pr.	20 May 1767
An Act for vesting, divers Leasehold Houses, late of Haydock Hill deceased, in Trustees, to be sold and converted into Money, to be applied, together with other Part of his Personal Estate, for the Benefit of his Children entitled to the same by virtue of his Will; and for confirming a Sale, Leases, and Contrail, made by his Widow and Executrix, of other Parts of his Estate, for the Benefit of his said Children.
Cooper's Estate Act 1767	7 Geo. 3. c. 71 Pr.	20 May 1767
An Act for Sale of the Real Estate of Tomkinson Cooper and Ann his Wife; and for laying out the Money arising from such Sale in the Purchase of other Lands and Hereditaments, for the Benefit of the said Tomkinson Cooper and Ann his Wife.
Bunting's Estate Act 1767	7 Geo. 3. c. 72 Pr.	20 May 1767
An Act for vesting divers Lands and Hereditaments, in the Parish of Hillborough, in the County of Norfolk, the Estate of Deborah Bunting, the Widow and Relist of Edward Bunting; Clerk, deceased, and Edward Bunting her Infant Son by the said Edward Bunting Clerk, in Trustees, to convey the same to Ralph Couldwell Esquire and his Heirs; and for securing the Money to be paid for the same.
Witham's Estate Act 1767	7 Geo. 3. c. 73 Pr.	20 May 1767
An Act for Sale of Part of the settled Estates of Matthew Henry Witham Esquire, in the County of York, for the discharging the Debts and Encumbrances thereon; and for other Purposes therein expressed.
Minchin's Estate Act 1767	7 Geo. 3. c. 74 Pr.	20 May 1767
An Act to empower the High Court of Chancery to order so much of the Personal Estate of George Minchin deceased, as now stands in the Name of the Accomptant General of the said Court, to be transferred and paid to Paul Minchin and Henrietta Minchin, the only Children of the said George Minchin, without their giving any Security to refund the same.
Letten's Estate Act 1767	7 Geo. 3. c. 75 Pr.	20 May 1767
An Act for vesting an undivided Third Part of certain Manors, Messages, Lands, Tenements, and Hereditaments, situate and being in the City of London, and in the Counties of Oxford and Bucks, heretofore the Estate of Susannah Letten Widow deceased, in certain Trustees and their Heirs, in Trast, to be sold; and for paying and applying the Money to arise by the Sale thereof in the Manner therein mentioned.
Rycroft's Estate Act 1767	7 Geo. 3. c. 76 Pr.	20 May 1767
An Act to empower Richard Ryecroft Clerk, and his Issue claiming under his Marriage Settlement, to grant Leases of Houses and Grounds in Clarges Street, in the County of Middlesex.
Bond's Estate Act 1767	7 Geo. 3. c. 77 Pr.	20 May 1767
An Act for vesting several undivided Moieties, and other Parts, Shares, Hereditaments, and Premises, being Part of the Estate of John Bond Esquire and Mary his Wife, in Trustees, to be sold, discharged of the Uses of their Marriage Settlement; and investing the Money arising by such Sale in the Purchase of other Lands, to be settled to the Uses of the same Settlement.
Sharpe's Estate Act 1767	7 Geo. 3. c. 78 Pr.	20 May 1767
An Act for vesting a Message, and divers Lands, with the Appurtenances, in the County of Hertford, Part of the Estate comprised in the Marriage Settlement of Fane William Sharpe Esquire, in Trustees, to be sold and for purchasing other Lands and Tenements, to be settled to the like Uses.
Executing articles of agreement entered into by George Pitt and tenants and John Pitt for exchange of lands in Purbeck.	7 Geo. 3. c. 79 Pr.	20 May 1767
An Act for carrying into Execution certain Articles of Agreement, entered into by George Pitt Esquire and his Tenants of the Manor of Kingston and John Pitt Esquire, and by the said George Pitt and John Pitt, for the Exchange of Lands in Purbeck, in the County of Dorset.
Becke's Estate Act 1767	7 Geo. 3. c. 80 Pr.	20 May 1767
An Act for exonerating Part of the Estate late of Thomas Becke Gentleman, deceased, charged with an Annuity, or clear Yearly Rent, of One Hundred Pounds, of and from the Payment of the said Rent; and for substituting and making liable to the Payment thereof other Part of the Estate of the said Thomas Becke, of equal Value.
Vesting lands in Norfolk, devised by John Woodcock and Mary Platfoot, in Mathew Pepper Manby and heirs and settling other lands in lieu thereof.	7 Geo. 3. c. 81 Pr.	20 May 1767
An Act for vesting divers Messages, Lands, and Hereditaments, in the County of Norfolk, devised by the Wills of John Woodcock and Mary Platfoot deceased, in Mathew Pepper Manby and his Heirs; and for settling other Lands and Hereditaments, in the same County, in Lieu thereof, to the Uses therein mentioned.
Osbourne's Estate Act 1767	7 Geo. 3. c. 82 Pr.	20 May 1767
An Act for Sale of divers Freehold and Copyhold Lands and Tenements, in the Parish of Sunbury, in the County of Middlesex, and of certain Copyhold Lands in the Parish of Hampton, in the said County, Part of the Estate of John Osborne deceased, unto the Right Honourable George Earl of Pomfret, pursuant to an Agreement; and to apply the Purchase money in discharging the Debts and Encumbrances affecting the said Estate; and for other Purposes therein mentioned.
Enabling the King to grant the inheritance in fee simple of lands and manors in Yorkshire, demised to Constantine Phipps by letters patent under Court of Exchequer's seal, to said Constantine and Constantine John Phipps his eldest son, upon payment of full consideration.	7 Geo. 3. c. 83 Pr.	20 May 1767
An Act to enable His Majesty to grant the Inheritance in Fee Simple of divers Manors, Lands, and Hereditaments, in the County of York, demised to Constantine Phipps Esquire, by Letters Patent under the Seal of His Majesty's Court of Exchequer, unto the said Constantine Phipps and Constantine John Phipps his Eldest Son, upon a full and adequate Consideration to be paid for the same.
Arthingworth Inclosure Act 1767	7 Geo. 3. c. 84 Pr.	20 May 1767
An Act for dividing and enclosing the Open and Common Fields, Common Meadows, Common Pastures, and Waste Grounds, in the Manor and Parish of Arthingworth, in the County of Northampton.
Distington Inclosure Act 1767	7 Geo. 3. c. 85 Pr.	20 May 1767
An Act for dividing and enclosing the Open Common within the Manor of Distington, in the County of Cumberland.
Hensingham Inclosure Act 1767	7 Geo. 3. c. 86 Pr.	20 May 1767
An Act for dividing and enclosing the Open Commons within the Manor of Hensingham, in the County of Cumberland.
East Barkwith Inclosure Act 1767	7 Geo. 3. c. 87 Pr.	20 May 1767
An Act for dividing and enclosing certain Open Common Fields and Meadows, in the Parish of East Barkwith, in the County of Lincoln.
Shap Inclosure Act 1767	7 Geo. 3. c. 88 Pr.	20 May 1767
An Act for dividing and enclosing the Open Commons in the Manor of Shapp, in the County of Westmorland.
Reagill Inclosure Act 1767 (repealed)	7 Geo. 3. c. 89 Pr.	20 May 1767
An Act for dividing and enclosing the Open Commons in the Manor of Reagill, in the County of Westmorland. (Repealed by Reagill Inclosure Act 1803 (43 Geo. 3. c. lxxvi))
Farndon Inclosure Act 1767	7 Geo. 3. c. 90 Pr.	20 May 1767
An Act for dividing and enclosing the Open Fields, Meadows, Pastures, and Waste Grounds, in the Parish of Farndon, in the County of Nottingham.
Adlingfleet, Fockerby, and Haldenby (Yorkshire) Inclosure Act 1767	7 Geo. 3. c. 91 Pr.	20 May 1767
An Act for dividing and enclosing certain Lands, Grounds, and Commons, in the several Townships of Adlingsleet, Fockerby, and Haldenby, in the West Riding the County of York.
Willersey Inclosure Act 1767	7 Geo. 3. c. 92 Pr.	20 May 1767
An Act for dividing and enclosing the Open and Common Fields, Commonable Lands, and Waste Grounds, of and in the Parish of Willersey, in the County of Gloucester.
Castle Sowerby (Cumberland) Inclosure Act 1767	7 Geo. 3. c. 93 Pr.	20 May 1767
An Act for dividing and enclosing the Common and several Waste Grounds within the Manor and Parish of Castle Sowerby, in the County of Cumberland.
Skelton nclosure Act 1767	7 Geo. 3. c. 94 Pr.	20 May 1767
An Act for dividing and enclosing the Common and several Waste Grounds within the Manor and Parish of Skelton, in the County of Cumberland.
Koe and Wolff naturalization.	7 Geo. 3. c. 95 Pr.	20 May 1767
An Act for naturalizing John Koe and George Wolffe.
Gerrard Goebell's Naturalization Act 1767	7 Geo. 3. c. 96 Pr.	20 May 1767
An Act for naturalizing Gerrard Goebell.
William Earl of Radnor's Estate Act 1767	7 Geo. 3. c. 97 Pr.	29 June 1767
An Act for vesting several Lands and Tenements, settled and entailed upon William Earl of Radnor and his Issue by the Wills of Jacob late Viscount Folkestone and Sir Edward Des Bouverie Baronet, deceased, in Trustees, to be sold; and for purchasing and settling other Lands and Hereditaments in Lien thereof; and to empower the Tenants for Life to make such Leases as are therein mentioned.
Confirming a partition between Reverend Erasmus and Mary Saunders and Samuel and Ann Roycroft of estates in Lincolnshire and settling the same to uses and trusts contained in their respective marriage settlements.	7 Geo. 3. c. 98 Pr.	29 June 1767
An Act for confirming a Partition between the Reverend Erasmus Saunders Doctor in Divinity and Mary his Wise, and Samuel Roycroft the Younger Esquire and Ann his Wife, of several Estates in the County of Lincoln; and for vesting and settling the same to the Uses, and on the Trusts, contained in their respective Marriage Settlements with respect to such Estates; and for other the Purposes therein mentioned.
John Cogan's Estate Act 1767	7 Geo. 3. c. 99 Pr.	29 June 1767
An Act for vesting the undivided Parts of several Manors, Messuages, Closes, Lands, Tenements, Tolls, and other Hereditaments, in the Counties of Leicester and Northampton, devised by the Will of John Cogan Surgeon, deceased, in Trustees, to be sold; and for applying the Money arising by such Sale in the Purchase of other Lands, Tenements, and Hereditaments, to be settled to the Uses contained in the said Will.
Richard Williamson's Estate Act 1767	7 Geo. 3. c. 100 Pr.	29 June 1767
An Act for vesting Part of the settled Estate of Richard Williamson Esquire in Trustees, to be sold; and for applying the Money arising by such Sale for reimbursing the said Richard Williamson the Expenses he has been at in improving the said Estate; and other Purposes therein mentioned.
Benjamin Booth's Estate Act 1767	7 Geo. 3. c. 101 Pr.	29 June 1767
An Act for vesting Part of the settled Estate of Benjamin Booth Esquire and Jane his Wise, in the County of Salop, in Trustees, to be sold; and for laying out the Money arising from such Sale in the Purchase of Lands and Hereditaments, to be settled to the like Uses.
William Hoskins' Estate Act 1767	7 Geo. 3. c. 102 Pr.	29 June 1767
An Act for vesting Part of the settled Estate of William Hoskins Esquire, deceased, in the Counties of Surrey and Kent, in Trustees, to be sold, for discharging Money due upon a Mortgage of his Estate in “Kent, called Hethenden Farm, and other Debts and Encumbrances; and for settling said Estate called Hethenden Farm, so disencumbered, to and for the Uses and Purposes therein mentioned.
John Bamber's Estate Act 1767	7 Geo. 3. c. 103 Pr.	29 June 1767
An Act for Sale of divers Messuages, Farms, Lands, and Tenements, in the County of Essex, entailed by the Will of Doctor John Bamher, deceased; and for laying out the Money arising by such Sale in the Purchase of other Lands and Hereditaments, to be settled in Lieu thereof to the like Uses.
John Wicker's Estate Act 1767	7 Geo. 3. c. 104 Pr.	29 June 1767
An Act for vesting divers Lands and Hereditaments, in the Counties of Sussex, Surry, and Kent, Part of the settled Estate of John Wicker Esquire, in him, his Heirs, Executors, and Administrators; and for settling the Manor of Knepp alias Knapp, and divers Lands and Hereditaments, in the County of Sussex, being the Estate of the said John Wicker, of greater Value, in Lieu thereof.
Poyntz' Estate Act 1767	7 Geo. 3. c. 105 Pr.	29 June 1767
An Act for vesting Part of the settled Estates of William Poyntz Esquire in Trustees, to be sold, for discharging the Encumbrances affecting the same; and for applying the Remainder of the Money thereby raised in the Purchase of other Lands, Tenements, and Hereditaments, to be settled to the Uses to which the said Estate stood settled; and for other Purposes therein mentioned.
Dowding's Estate Act 1767	7 Geo. 3. c. 106 Pr.	29 June 1767
An Act for vesting the settled Estates of Susanna Dowding Widow, in the Counties of Kent and Sussex in Trustees, to be sold; and for securing the Monies to be paid for the same upon the Trusts, and for the Purposes, in the Act mentioned.
Ringmer Inclosure Act 1767	7 Geo. 3. c. 107 Pr.	29 June 1767
An Act for dividing and enclosing a Parcel of Ground called Broyle Park, within the Manor of Ringmer, in the County of Sussex.
Scamblesby Inclosure Act 1767	7 Geo. 3. c. 108 Pr.	29 June 1767
An Act for dividing and enclosing the Open and Common Fields, Common Meadows, and other Commonable Lands and Grounds, in the Parish of Scamblesby, in the County of Lincoln.
Shernborn Inclosure Act 1767	7 Geo. 3. c. 109 Pr.	29 June 1767
An Act for dividing, allotting, and enclosing, the Whole-year Lands and Pasture Grounds, Half-year Enclosures, Common Fields, and Common or Heath Ground, in the Parish of Shernborn in the County of Norfolk.
Great Oxendon Inclosure Act 1767	7 Geo. 3. c. 110 Pr.	29 June 1767
An Act for dividing and enclosing the several Open and Common Fields, Common Meadows, Pastures, and Commons, within the Manor and Lordship or Parish of Great Oxendon, in the County of Northampton.
Kendal Fell Act 1767	7 Geo. 3. c. 111 Pr.	29 June 1767
An Act for enclosing a Piece of Waste Ground, in the Borough and Township of Kirkby in Kendal, for the Benefit of the Poor; and for cleansing and enlightening the Streets of the said Town; and for confirming a Rule or Order of Assize, and Order of the High Court of Chancery, relating to the Rates and Assessments to be raised for Relief of the Poor, by the Inhabitants of the said Township, and the Owners of Lands called The Park and Castle Lands.
Holland Fen (Lincolnshire) Division Act 1767	7 Geo. 3. c. 112 Pr.	29 June 1767
An Act for dividing a certain Fen, called The Haute Huntre, Eight Hundred, or Holland Fen, and certain other Commonable Places adjoining thereto, in the Parts of Holland, in the County of Lincoln.
Wilnecote Inclosure and Coal Mines Act 1767	7 Geo. 3. c. 113 Pr.	29 June 1767
An Act to amend and render more effectual so much of an Act made in the 31st Year of the Reign of His late Majesty, (Note: Wilnecote Inclosure Act 1757 (31 Geo. 2. c. 34 Pr.)) as relates to the draining and working certain Coal Mines in the Manor of Wilnecote, in the County of Warwick.
Moyle's Name Act 1767	7 Geo. 3. c. 114 Pr.	29 June 1767
An Act to enable Joseph Copley Esquire (lately called Joseph Moyle) and his Issue to take, use, and bear, the Surname and Arms of Copley, pursuant to the Will of Lionel Copley Esquire, deceased.
Heyman's Naturalization Act 1767	7 Geo. 3. c. 115 Pr.	29 June 1767
An Act for naturalizing Henry Heyman.
Duke of St. Albans' Estate Act 1767	7 Geo. 3. c. 116 Pr.	2 July 1767
An Act for vesting Part of the Estates of George Duke of Saint Albans in Trustees, for raising Money to pay Debts; and for other Purposes therein mentioned.
Lamack's Naturalization Act 1767	7 Geo. 3. c. 117 Pr.	2 July 1767
An Act for naturalizing Sophia Magdalen Lamack an Infant.

=== Sources ===
- "7 George III - 1766-7". The Statutes at Large. Vol. 27. Cambridge, Printed by Joseph Bentham. 1762 – via Internet Archive.
- "7 George III - 1766-7". The Statutes at Large. Vol. 27 – via Google Books.
- "7 George III - 1766-7". The Statutes at Large. Vol. 27. 1762 – via Internet Archive.
- "7 George III - 1766-7". The Statutes at Large. Vol. 27 – via Google Books.
- Journals of the House of Commons. Vol. 31. London: His Majesty's Stationery Office. 1803. pp. 3–418 – via Google Books.
- Chronological Table of and Index to the Statutes. Vol. 1: To the End of the Session 59 Vict. Sess. 2 (1895) (13th ed.). London: Her Majesty's Stationery Office. 1896. pp. 124–125 – via Google Books.

== See also ==
- List of acts of the Parliament of Great Britain
