= Listed buildings in Cauldwell, Derbyshire =

Cauldwell is a civil parish in the South Derbyshire district of Derbyshire, England. The parish contains four listed buildings that are recorded in the National Heritage List for England. Of these, one is listed at Grade II*, the middle of the three grades, and the others are at Grade II, the lowest grade. The parish contains the village of Cauldwell and the surrounding area. The listed buildings consist of a church, a small country house, and two farmhouses.

== Key ==
Grade	Criteria
II*	Particularly important buildings of more than special interest
II	Buildings of national importance and special interest

== Buildings ==
Name and location	Photograph	Date	Notes	Grade
St Giles' Church; 52.75181°N 1.62506°W		12th century	The church has been much altered, particularly in 1843 and 1865 when the bellcote and the porch were added. It is in stone and has a tile roof with red and blue bands. The church consists of a nave, a south porch, a lower chancel, and a north vestry. On the west gable is a gabled bellcote.	II
Cauldwell Hall; 52.75161°N 1.62344°W	—	1727	A small country house, later converted into a school, it is in red brick on a moulded stone plinth, with rusticated corner pilasters, moulded cornices, a string course, and hipped slate roofs. There are two storeys, in parts with attics, and a U-shaped plan. The main range has five bays, and the projecting wings each has three bays. The attics have coped parapets, and on the pilasters are gadrooned urns. In the centre is a doorway with a moulded surround converted into a sash window, in the centre of each wing is a canted bay window, and the other windows are sashes with keystones.	II*
Manor Farmhouse; 52.75201°N 1.62275°W	—	Late 18th century	The farmhouse is in two parts, both in red brick. The southern part has a stone plinth, a sill band, and a slate roof with coped gables. There are three storeys and a basement, and three bays, the middle bay projecting with a bracketed cornice and a pediment. The northern part has a tile roof with a stepped eaves band, and is recessed with two storeys and two bays. The doorway in the southern part has a semicircular head, Tuscan columns, and a pediment, and in the northern part the doorway has a segmental head and a fanlight. The windows are sashes with keystones, and at the rear is a Venetian staircase window.	II
Priory Farmhouse; 52.75374°N 1.62423°W	—	1815	The farmhouse is in brick with a chequered front, a sawtooth eaves band at the rear, and a tile roof. There are three storeys and an L-shaped plan, with a front range of three bays, and a rear wing. In the centre, steps lead to a Tuscan doorway with a fanlight and an open pediment, and the windows on the front are sashes. The rear wing contains casement windows and a doorway, all with cambered heads, and a terracotta datestone.	II
