= Listed buildings in Drakelow =

Drakelow is a civil parish in the South Derbyshire district of Derbyshire, England. The parish contains six listed buildings that are recorded in the National Heritage List for England. All the listed buildings are designated at Grade II, the lowest of the three grades, which is applied to "buildings of national importance and special interest". The major building in the parish had been Drakelow Hall until it was demolished in 1934. The listed buildings consist of two farmhouses, and surviving structures associated with the hall.

== Buildings ==
Name and location	Photograph	Date	Notes
Stable block and cottages to former Drakelow Hall; 52.77939°N 1.64451°W	—	Early 18th century	The buildings are in red brick with stone dressings and tile roofs. They form a U-shaped plan, with an eight-bay west range, an eight-bay south range, and an eleven-bay east range, all with two storeys.
Grove Farmhouse; 52.76674°N 1.65379°W	—	Mid 18th century	The farmhouse is in red brick with stone dressings, a dentilled eaves band, and a tile roof. There are two storeys and attics, a double range plan, and a front of five bays. In the centre is a doorway with a fanlight and a bracketed hood. This is flanked by canted bay windows with dentilled cornices, and in the upper floor are sash windows with keystones. In the rear range is a two-storey canted bay window.
Garden wall east of the Sunken Gardens at Site of Drakelow Hall; 52.78075°N 1.64448°W	—	Late 18th century	The wall, which was altered in about 1902 by Reginald Blomfield, is in red brick with chamfered copings and stone dressings, it is 10 feet (3.0 m) high, and curving. The wall contains a doorway, and a gateway with a rusticated moulded semicircular arch and an iron gate. Over the arch are pilasters and large ball finials.
Royle Farmhouse; 52.76840°N 1.62552°W	—	Early 19th century	The farmhouse is in red brick with floor bands, a dentilled eaves band, and a tile roof with coped gables. There are three storeys and three bays. The central doorway has a fanlight, it is flanked by three-pane sash windows, and in the upper floors are casement windows flanked by sashes.
Piers and walls, Drakelow Lodge; 52.76917°N 1.65936°W		c. 1900	The gateway was designed by Reginald Blomfield. Flanking the entrance to the drive are stone piers 15 feet (4.6 m) high. On the front face of each pier is a coat of arms in a Baroque cartouche with swags of fruit. Each pier has a moulded base, an acanthus leaf cornice, and a large ball finial on a decorated base. These are flanked by curving walls ending in smaller piers with moulded bases, cornices and ball finials.
Sunken Gardens at Site of Drakelow Hall; 52.78068°N 1.64615°W	—	1902	The gardens were designed by Reginald Blomfield, and have a rectangular plan, with the River Trent on the north side, and raised terraces on the other three sides. On the south side is a stone pavilion containing a semicircular moulded arch with a double keystone flanked by attached Tuscan columns. On the top is a balcony, and the pavilion is flanked by steps. Elsewhere, there are walls containing niches, recesses and archways.
