= John Edensor Heathcote =

English knight (c.1757 – 1822)

Sir John Edensor Heathcote
- Born: 1757; Longton Hall
- Died: 1822 (aged 64–65)
- Occupation: industrialist

Sir John Edensor Heathcote (c.1757 – 1822) was an English industrialist, operating in Stoke-on-Trent, and owner of Longton Hall in Longton, Staffordshire, which he rebuilt in 1778.

He was born in Longton Hall as the son of Rachel Edensor and Michael Heathcote, a nephew of Lancashire colliery owner John Heathcote.

In 1780, he married Anne Gresley (1755–1797) in Knypersley, Staffs, the daughter of Sir Nigel Gresley, 6th Baronet of Drakelow and Elizabeth Wynne.

He was knighted in 1784, the year in which he served as High Sheriff of Staffordshire.

He died in 1822, his estate passing to his son Richard Edensor Heathcote MP.
