= Caldwell, Derbyshire =

Village in Derbyshire, England

Coordinates: 52.75°N 01.63°W

Caldwell
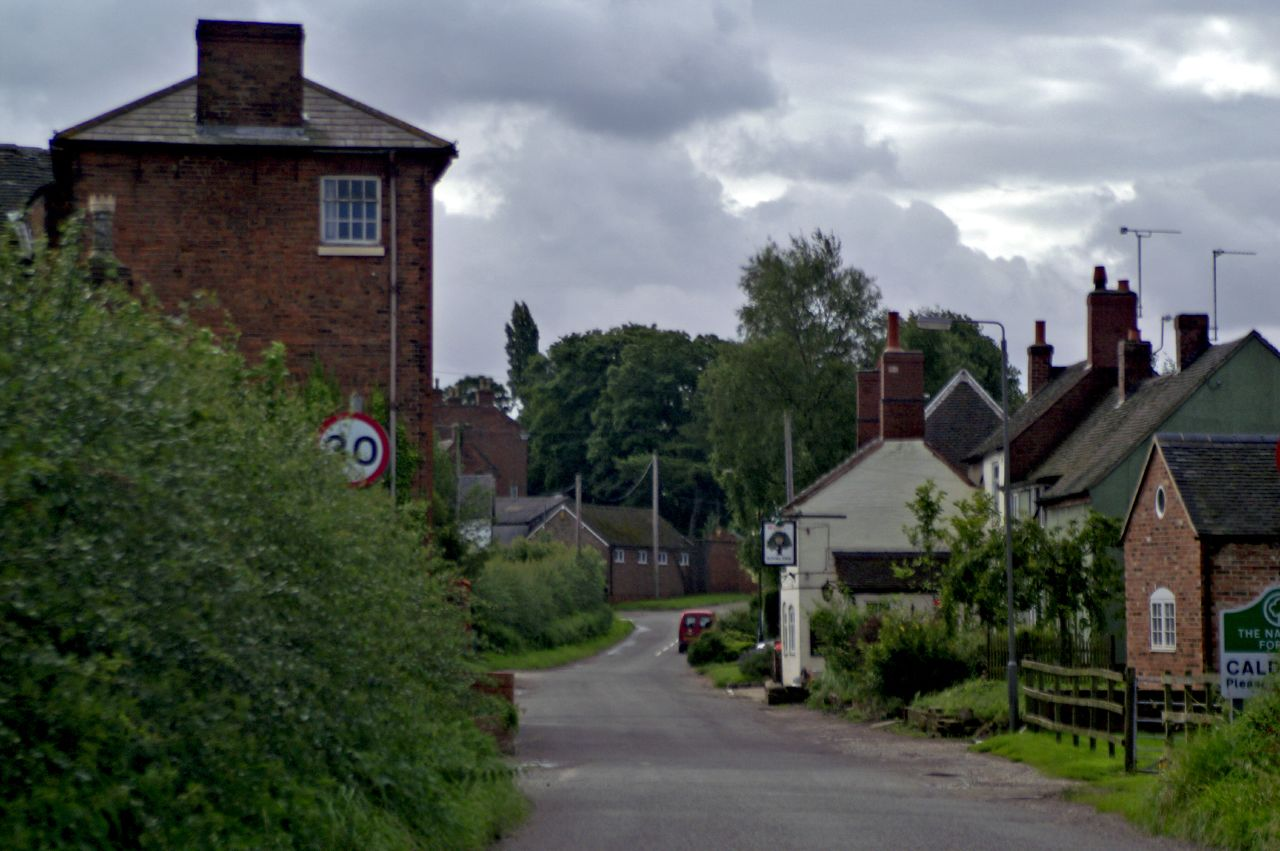

- Location within Derbyshire
- OS grid reference: SK2517
- Civil parish: Cauldwell
- District: South Derbyshire
- Shire county: Derbyshire
- Region: East Midlands
- Country: England
- Sovereign state: United Kingdom
- Post town: Swadlincote
- Postcode district: DE12
- Police: Derbyshire
- Fire: Derbyshire
- Ambulance: East Midlands

Caldwell is a small village in south Derbyshire, England within the National Forest and in the parish of Cauldwell. At the 2011 census, the population is listed under the civil parish of Drakelow.
