= Drakelow =

Village in Derbyshire, England

Coordinates: 52.774°N 1.636°W

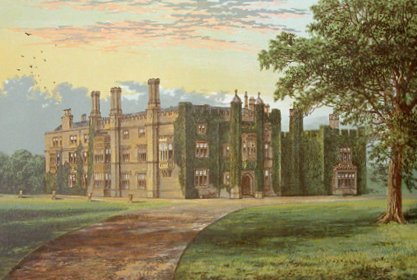
- Drakelow Hall in about 1880

- Location within Derbyshire
- Population: 249 (2011)
- OS grid reference: SK246196
- Civil parish: Drakelow
- District: South Derbyshire
- Shire county: Derbyshire
- Region: East Midlands
- Country: England
- Sovereign state: United Kingdom
- Post town: BURTON ON TRENT
- Postcode district: DE15
- Police: Derbyshire
- Fire: Derbyshire
- Ambulance: East Midlands
- Website: drakelowparish.gov.uk

Drakelow is a village and civil parish in South Derbyshire, England. It is 2 miles (3.2 km) south of Burton on Trent. The population of the civil parish, combined with Caldwell and Cauldwell parishes, was 249 at the 2011 census.

== Geography and history ==
Some of the land is lower flood plain but most occupies gentle slopes, all on the east bank of the River Trent.

Drakelow, whose name means 'Dragon's Mound', is mentioned in Domesday Book, but was deserted later during the Middle Ages. A chronicler at the nearby Burton Abbey, writing in the early twelfth century, claimed that this desertion took place because of supernatural events that had driven the residents away – specifically, attacks of two undead villagers from nearby Stapenhill.

Drakelowe Hall or Drakelow Hall was the principal residence, and was home to the Gresley Baronets until 1934 when the estate was sold and the hall demolished.

== Power stations ==
Part of the Drakelow Hall land was used to build Drakelow Power Station, commissioned in 1955, and enlarged in 1960 and 1964. The coal-fired generators were taken out of service and demolished in stages between 1984 and 2006.

Planning permission was granted in 2005 for a gas-fired power station on the site, but it was not built. Instead, Vital Energi opened an energy-from-waste facility on the site in 2023, on land leased from E.ON.

== See also ==
- Listed buildings in Drakelow
