= Newcastle-under-Lyme Canal =

Former canal in Staffordshire, England

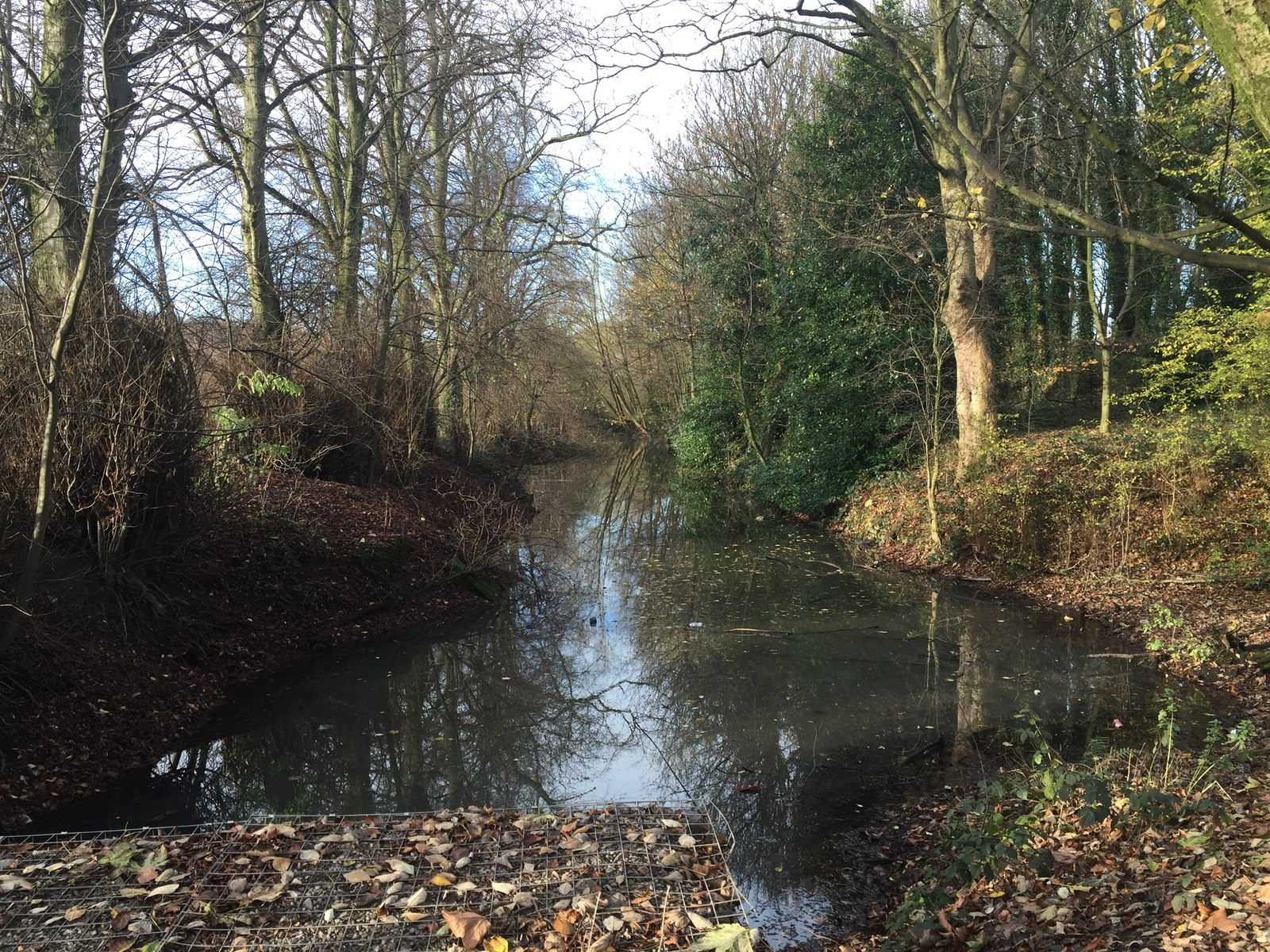
- Remains of the canal in Newcastle-under-Lyme, alongside the A34

Specifications
- Locks: 0

History
- Date of act: 1795
- Date completed: early 1800s
- Date closed: 1935

Geography
- Start point: Stoke-on-Trent
- End point: Newcastle-under-Lyme
- Connects to: Trent and Mersey Canal

The Newcastle-under-Lyme Canal was a 3-mile 6 furlongs (6 km) level canal from the Trent and Mersey Canal at Stoke-on-Trent to Newcastle-under-Lyme. It was completed in 1800. The canal has been disused since 1935.

== History ==
Stoke to Newcastle Canal Act 1795
- Act of Parliament
- Parliament of Great Britain
- Long title: An Act for making and maintaining a navigable canal from and out of the navigation from the Trent to the Mersey, at or near Stoke upon Trent, in the county of Stafford, to the town of Newcastle under Lyme, in the said county.
- Citation: 35 Geo. 3. c. 87
- Territorial extent: Great Britain

Dates
- Royal assent: 2 June 1795
- Commencement: 2 June 1795 (Note: The Acts of Parliament (Commencement) Act 1793.)
Other legislation
Amended by	Newcastle-under-Lyme Canal (Lease) Act 1864

Status: Amended

Text of statute as originally enacted

The Trent and Mersey Canal had been authorised by the Trent and Mersey Canal Act 1766 (6 Geo. 3. c. 96), and opened in 1777. At the time it was called the Grand Trunk Canal, and was part of a grand plan to link the ports of Hull and Liverpool, connecting both with the industrial regions of the Potteries and mid-Cheshire. When completed, it was some 93 miles (150 km) long, and connected with nine other canals or branches. There had been suggestions that a branch should be built from it to serve Newcastle at the time it was promoted, but this became less likely when Sir Nigel Gresley obtained authorisation to build a canal from his Apedale collieries to Newcastle in 1775. The enabling act of Parliament, the Sir Nigel Gresley's Canal Act 1775 (15 Geo. 3. c. 16), fixed the price at which coal could be sold in Newcastle for 42 years, and this monopoly meant that another canal to Newcastle was a much less attractive commercial proposition.

Despite the obvious obstacles, a private company decided to build a canal from the Trent and Mersey Canal to Newcastle in 1795. They succeeded in obtaining an act of Parliament, the Stoke to Newcastle Canal Act 1795 (35 Geo. 3. c. 87), which granted them permission for the making and maintaining a navigable Canal, from and out of the Navigation from the Trent to the Mersey, at or near Stoke-upon-Trent, in the county of Stafford, to the town of Newcastle-under-Lyme, in the said county. In order to fund construction, the Newcastle-under-Lyme Canal Company could raise £7,000 by issuing £50 shares, and could raise an additional £3,000 through mortgages, if required. What they could not do, however, was to carry coal to supply any of the areas mentioned in Gresley's canal act, until the stipulated 42 years had passed, although they could supply coal to manufacturers of earthenware products, provided the cost was less than 8 shillings per ton.

The canal opened around 1800, and because Gresley had exclusive rights to coal carrying, limestone became the main cargo on the Newcastle-under-Lyme Canal, as they sought other commodities to transport. The limestone came from quarries served by the Caldon Canal, a branch of the Trent and Mersey that ran from Stoke-on-Trent to Froghall in Staffordshire. It was supplied to ironworks, and was also burnt in kilns erected at the canal's terminal basin, to be used to improve soil condition on farms.

The failure of a proposal for the Commercial Canal in 1796, which Gresley hoped might link his canal to others, resulted in a much smaller scale proposal in 1798, for the Newcastle-under-Lyme Junction Canal. This would link his canal to the Newcastle-under-Lyme Canal. A bill was submitted to Parliament, and the Newcastle-under-Lyme Canal and Sir Nigel Bowyer Gresley's Canal Junction Act 1798 (38 Geo. 3. c. xxix) received royal assent on 26 May 1798. It authorised construction of a canal and several small railways. None of the railways were built, but the canal was soon finished, as like Gresley's Canal and the Newcastle-under-Lyme Canal, it was to be all on one level with no locks. It was restricted from carrying coal to the local area, as Gresley still held the monopoly on that. It was built on the same level as Gresley's Canal, diverging from it a little above its terminal basin, and ending at Stubbs Walks. To overcome the difference in height of the two canals, which was around 60 feet (18 m), a railway inclined plane was proposed, but was not built due to lack of funds. The new canal thus became a little-used extension to Gresley's Canal, rather than a link which might have brought more traffic to the Newcastle-under-Lyme Canal.

With no through traffic, the canal was a financial failure. It had been built using £7,000 from the share issue, and £3,518 had been borrowed. Income was around £300 per year from tolls and rents, while the lime kilns brought in another £63. This was insufficient to pay the interest on the loans, and they had run up a further debt of £1,582 in unpaid interest. Debts were reduced to about £2,000 in 1815, when they issued a further 64 shares, valued at £50, in exchange for £40 of debt. They were then able to keep up with the interest payments, pay the wages of the clerk and the treasurer, which amounted to £15 15s (£15.75) and were left with a small surplus. In November 1840, they paid the first dividend to shareholders of just £1 per share.

Newcastle-under-Lyme Canal (Lease) Act 1864 (Note: Section 1.)
- Act of Parliament
- Parliament of the United Kingdom
- Long title: An Act for vesting, by way of Lease in perpetuity, the Newcastle-under-Lyme Canal, and the Canal Extension Railway belonging thereto, in the North Staffordshire Railway Company; and for other Purposes.
- Citation: 27 & 28 Vict. c. cxviii
- Territorial extent: United Kingdom

Dates
- Royal assent: 23 June 1864
- Commencement: 23 June 1864
Other legislation
Amends	Stoke to Newcastle Canal Act 1795

Status: Current legislation

Text of statute as originally enacted

The canal was leased to the North Staffordshire Railway in 1863, confirmed by the Newcastle-under-Lyme Canal (Lease) Act 1864 (27 & 28 Vict. c. cxviii), who took over the £2,000 of debt, and paid a rent of £536 10s (£536.50) per year. As this was over 5 percent of the share capital, the shareholders benefitted very well from the agreement. They had previously only received dividends on five occasions. By this time the railway company also owned the Trent and Mersey Canal on which the Newcastle Canal very much depended. The railway company did not close down the Newcastle Canal and it continued in commercial use, being worked as if it was part of the Trent and Mersey Canal.

The northernmost part of the canal from Newcastle Basin to Trent Vale Bridge was closed in 1921, using powers obtained in the North Staffordshire Railway Act 1921 (11 & 12 Geo. 5. c. cxvii). The remaining part of the canal was closed in 1935, as it had not been used by boats for some years. Closure was authorised by the Stoke-on-Trent Corporation Act 1935 (25 & 26 Geo. 5. c. cxi). The railway company gave the land to Stoke-on-Trent Corporation, who used some of it to enable roads to be widened. Little evidence of the canal now remains.

== The route ==
The terminus of the Newcastle Canal was close to Brook Lane at an elevation of around 110m. A pub named the Boat & Horses still stands near the former basin though the basin itself was converted into railway sidings many years ago during the construction of the Stoke-on-Trent to Newcastle-under-Lyme train line, which began construction on 26 June 1846. Although still extant in 1971 these sidings have also now been removed.

The canal headed southeast on the west side of London Road (A34). Where Occupation Street leaves London Road is the spot that would have been the bottom of a planned inclined plane providing a link to the Newcastle-under-Lyme Junction Canal, and then on to Sir Nigel Gresley's Canal; however this inclined plane was never built and so the two canals never connected. Near here is the newly developed Lyme Valley Parkway, a recreational park built on a former rubbish tip. To the west of the canal line there is a small stream, Lyme Brook.

A little further south there is a small Jewish synagogue/cemetery and a bowling green. The canal ran behind these into a cutting surrounded by a small wood. Past here it emerged by the side of the busy A34 opposite the University Hospital of North Staffordshire. Surprisingly this section has survived and today it is the only part of any of the canal that holds water.

A couple of minor roads crossed the canal as it ran south close to the A34. At Oak Hill the canal curved southwest for a hundred yards or so and then curved back round to head east under the A34. The crossing point on the main road was about halfway between the B5041 (heading north east towards Stoke) and the A34/A500 Hanford roundabout. At Oak Hill the dry bed of the canal can be found behind The Cottage pub.

Roughly following the B5041, the canal continued east until it reached the now minor road but former A5006 which runs north east from the afore mentioned roundabout. When the canal reached the old A5006 it turned again and headed northeast into Boothen. The route pulled away from the A5006 until it came close to the B5041. In Boothen the line of the canal can still be seen where it is grassed over alongside this London Road.

Just before the B5041 and the former canal line met the A52 in Stoke the canal disappeared into a relatively short tunnel. This passed under the junction between Church Street and London Road. There were tramways on both roads, owned by the Potteries Electric Traction Company.

On the far side of the tunnel is Spode factory and museum, shortly after this the Newcastle Canal ran into the Trent and Mersey Canal near Glebe Street. Until the early 1970s there was a 100-yard stretch of navigable Newcastle-under-Lyme Canal here which was used as moorings for Stoke Boat Club, this stretch was wiped out when the A500 by-pass was built. The one remaining item of the canal which can still be seen in Stoke is the site of a bridge in Corporation Street where both parapets have survived near the junction with London Road (B5041).

== See also ==
- Canals of Great Britain
- History of the British canal system
- Trent and Mersey Canal

== Bibliography ==
- Hadfield, Charles (1985). The Canals of the West Midlands. David and Charles. ISBN 978-0-7153-8644-6.
- Nicholson (2006). Nicholson Guides Vol 4: Four Counties & the Welsh Canals. Harper Collins. ISBN 978-0-00-721112-8.
- Priestley, John (1831). Historical Account of the Navigable Rivers, Canals, and Railways, of Great Britain. pp. 470–471. Archived from the original on 4 March 2016.
