= Cauldwell, Derbyshire =

Civil parish in Derbyshire, England

Coordinates: 52.752°N 1.623°W

Cauldwell
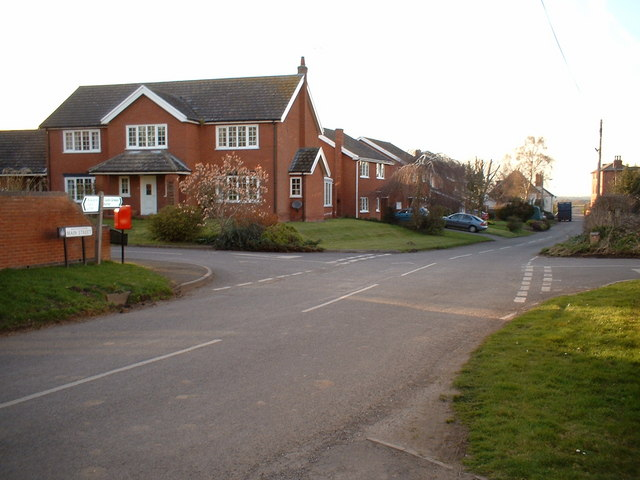
- Cauldwell

- Cauldwell parish highlighted within Derbyshire
- OS grid reference: SK255172
- District: South Derbyshire
- Shire county: Derbyshire
- Region: East Midlands
- Country: England
- Sovereign state: United Kingdom
- Post town: SWADLINCOTE
- Postcode district: DE12
- Police: Derbyshire
- Fire: Derbyshire
- Ambulance: East Midlands

Cauldwell (pronounced "Cordal") is a civil parish in South Derbyshire. The small village within the parish is confusingly named Caldwell. Its streets are named Main Street, Church Lane and Sandy Lane. It has a school for children with special needs.

It is 4 miles (6.4 km) south east of Burton on Trent and nearby settlements are Linton, Rosliston, Coton Park and Botany Bay.

== See also ==
- Listed buildings in Cauldwell, Derbyshire
