= Apedale =

Coordinates: 53.03°N 02.28°W

- Location within Staffordshire
- OS grid reference: SJ8149
- District: Newcastle-under-Lyme
- Shire county: Staffordshire
- Region: West Midlands
- Country: England
- Sovereign state: United Kingdom
- Post town: NEWCASTLE
- Postcode district: ST5
- Dialling code: 01782
- Police: Staffordshire
- Fire: Staffordshire
- Ambulance: West Midlands
- UK Parliament: Newcastle-under-Lyme

Apedale is a village in Staffordshire, England. The population at the 2011 census can be found under the Holditch (Ward) of Newcastle-under-Lyme.

The village is home to the 454-acre (184 ha) Apedale Community Country Park. The park is unusual for the area as it was previously an opencast mine.

The area has a long history of mining, with the nearby former collieries at Silverdale and Holditch also having been redeveloped for other uses.

== See also ==
- Listed buildings in Newcastle-under-Lyme
