= Tissington and Lea Hall =

Civil parish in Derbyshire, England

Coordinates: 53.07°N 1.74°W

- Civil parish
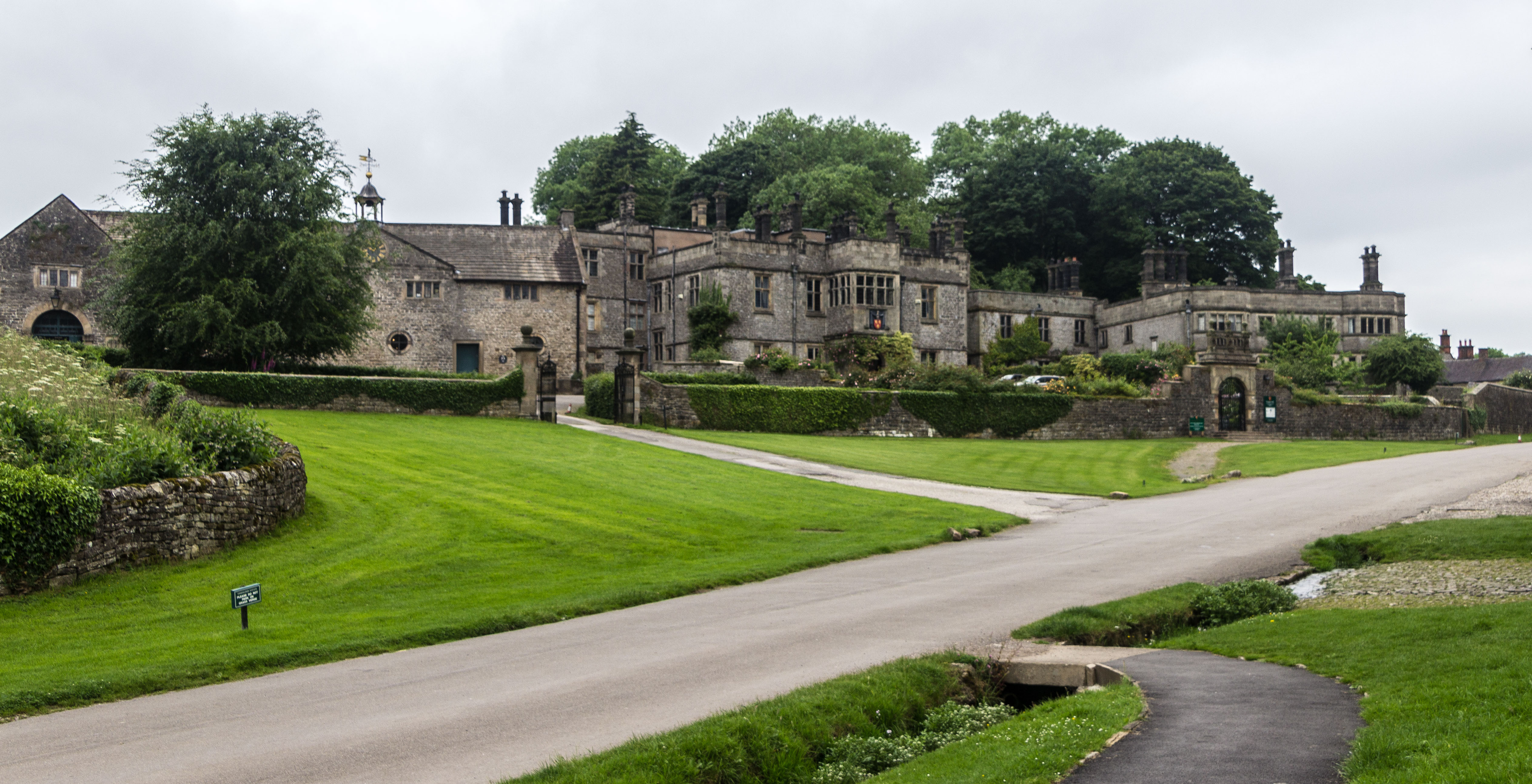
- Tissington Hall

- Location within Derbyshire
- Interactive map of Tissington and Lea Hall
- Area: 4.29 sq mi (11.1 km^{2})
- Population: 134 (2021)
  - Density: 31/sq mi (12/km^{2})
- OS grid reference: SK 18361 51976
  - London: 125 mi (201 km) SE
- District: Derbyshire Dales
- Shire county: Derbyshire
- Region: East Midlands
- Country: England
- Sovereign state: United Kingdom
- Settlements: Tissington
- Post town: ASHBOURNE
- Postcode district: DE6
- Dialling code: 01335
- Police: Derbyshire
- Fire: Derbyshire
- Ambulance: East Midlands
- UK Parliament: Derbyshire Dales
- Website: tissingtonandleahallparishcouncil.weebly.com

Tissington and Lea Hall is a civil parish within the Derbyshire Dales district, which is in the county of Derbyshire, England. Named for its settlements and sparsely built up with much rural expanse, its population was 134 residents in the 2021 census. The parish is 125 miles (201 km) north west of London, 15 miles (24 km) north west of the county town of Derby, and 3 miles (4.8 km) north of the nearest market town of Ashbourne. It shares a boundary with the parishes of Ballidon, Bradbourne, Fenny Bentley, Kniveton, Newton Grange, Parwich and Thorpe. The parish is wholly within the Peak District National Park.

== Geography ==
=== Location ===
==== Placement and size ====
Tissington and Lea Hall parish is surrounded by the following local Derbyshire places:

- Newton Grange and Parwich to the north
- Fenny Bentley and Thorpe to the south
- Bradbourne and Kniveton to the east
- Ilam and Stanshope to the west.

It is 4.3 square miles (11 km^{2}; 1,100 ha) in area, 2 1/2 miles (4.0 km) in length and 3 1/2 miles (5.6 km) in width at its broadest, within the far western portion of the Derbyshire Dales district, and is also to the far west of the Derbyshire county, resting against the boundary. The parish is bounded by features such as the Bradbourne and Bentley brooks to the east, Bletch Brook to the north, Thorpe Pastures to the south, and the River Dove to the west.

==== Settlements ====
There are a number of areas of built environment within the parish, outside of this comprises substantial rural expanse and farmland. The main locales are:

- Tissington - this is to the centre of the parish and consists of a sparsely populated village
- Lea Hall - this is a hamlet in the east of the parish near the Bradbourne brook comprising a farm and manorial farmhouse converted to a guesthouse

==== Routes ====
The A515 road is the primary road within the parish, running north-south through the centre of the parish between Ashbourne and Buxton. The parish briefly touches the B5056 road which runs to the east and south east of the parish from Longcliffe, paralleling the Bradbourne brook and meeting the A515 near Fenny Bentley village. The unclassified road from the B5056 called Bent Lane notably runs through Tissington Ford by the parish eastern boundary, over the aforementioned brook.

=== Environment ===
==== Landscape ====
The parish is positioned between the River Dove in the west and the Bletch/Bradbourne/Bentley brooks to the east, the ground slopes upwards from these towards the centre, close to Tissington. The wider region is classified by Natural England as being within the White Peak and Peak Fringe character areas. The west of the parish alongside the river is the Dovedale valley, and the land rises sharply from there, forming a plateau. Several natural features along the valley include Reynard's Cave, and the Lover's Leap and Twelve Apostles pinnacles, the land undulating somewhat as it nears the A515 road. The parish is sparsely urbanised, mainly to the middle along communication routes, but is otherwise overwhelmingly rural and farmland. Substantial areas of trees are few; Dovedale Wood surrounds the River Dove, a valley-side coppice is alongside the Bradbourne brook to the south east, also there is a shaped cluster known as Pegg's Walk, surrounding parkland at Tissington Hall.

==== Geology ====
The bedrock of the parish is complex with several limestone layers found. In the parish to the west is the Milldale Formation, dated between 358 and 330 million years ago during the Carboniferous period, alongside the Hopedale Formation, comprising sedimentary bedrock formed between 337 and 329 million years ago during the same period. To the east is substantially taken up by the Widmerpool Formation, which is bedrock formed between 337 and 329 million years ago during the Carboniferous period, and this is overlain in places by a volcanic layer named for the village, Tissington Member - Hyaloclastite, this is an igneous bedrock formed between 330.9 and 329 million years ago during the same period.

==== Hydrological features ====
The River Dove forms all of the parish western boundary, the surrounding area creating the Dovedale valley, the parish not quite reaching as far as the stepping stones water feature. Other watercourses are along the eastern parish edge, Bletch Brook forms the north eastern section, Bradbourne Brook the east area and Bentley Brook is to the south east. Wash Brook is to the west of the A515 road. A former millrace known as Woodeaves Canal abuts the Bradbourne. There is a village pond.

==== Land elevation ====
The south of the parish surrounding the Bentley Brook valley along the parish boundary contains the lowest area, at ~136 metres (446 ft). The area along the south west by the River Dove is marginally higher, at 140 metres (460 ft). The land rises from these watercourses towards the settled areas, Lea Hall is in the range of 196–210 metres (643–689 ft) and Tissington village ranges between 220–245 metres (722–804 ft), Notable local peaks include Wibben Hill at 249 metres (817 ft) which is 1/2 mile (0.80 km) east of Tissington, Hunger Hill which is 276 metres (906 ft) and is 1/2 mile (0.80 km) north of Tissington, and the highest location Tissington Hill, which is 1 1/2 miles (2.4 km) west of the village and measuring 369 metres (1,211 ft).

== History ==
=== Toponymy ===
Tissington was the only settlement to be listed in the Domesday 1086 landholding survey. It was described as Tizinctun, which was thought to be named after a local person, the Old English name being Tidsige's farm or settlement. Lea Hall was first termed as Lie and variations thereof in the 13th century (such as 'Lee by Bradbourne') to help distinguish it from similarly named settlements (such as Lea), and meant 'the clearing' or meadow.

=== Prehistory to medieval times ===
The parish holds several artefacts of its prehistoric past, with relics from that era recorded from the Neolithic era (5000–4000 BC) such as Reynard's Cave on the cliffs of the Dovedale valley, which has been occupied since and several items have been discovered there including flint scrapers and pottery of the era, Iron Age (800 BC–100 AD) findings such as a potsherd influenced by Hallstatt culture, Roman (43 AD–409 AD) period items including a bronze fibula, ox goad and Castor ware pottery from the 2nd to 4th century, along with a coin hoard. Medieval relics include a coin from Henry III's reign.

Other historic items include an Early Bronze Age food vessel, a number of barrows also from the period include Sharp Low between Tissington village and Dovedale which held graves and an iron knife, Cromwell's Low near Tissington Hill with iron fragments and food vessel, and Crake Low where urn, gold coins and human remains were found. Boars Low (also known as Rose Low) is just west of Tissington and along with a grave also contained metal fragments from a shield and a sword. A dug-out canoe in good condition was found on the Bentley Brook, with suggestions it could date from the prehistoric era.

In 1066, at the time of the Norman Conquest, Tissington was held by a number of owners, including Gamal who had oversight over a number of manors in Derbyshire, and by 1086, the Domesday Book recorded the lord of the manor was also the wider tenant-in-chief, Henry de Ferrers. At this time there were only 12 villagers and a mill recorded, which was thought to be the Bradbourne mill as both Tissington and Lea Hall were then part of that larger manor. St Mary's was a chapel of ease dating from the 12th century, it was built on a moated fortification with a ha-ha, and the Ferrers gave the local tithes to Tutbury Priory. Geoffrey de Cauceis, a descendant, granted in 1205 to Godard de Bradbourne the manor of Bradbourne. However, All Saints Church in Bradbourne and its four chapeleries including Tissington St Mary's, parish lands, including a tithe in Lea Hall and Aldwark went to Dunstable Priory - Geoffrey's local monastery as he also held a manor near Northampton.

Lea Hall was the seat of the lord of the manor of Bradbourne, and was a moiety of Tissington, both were part of the larger Bradbourne Estate. At the 12th century it was also passed by the Ferrers to the Cauceis family. Also around this time Robert de Ferrers granted some land in Lea to Garendon Abbey in Leicestershire. In the early 1200s, at the Ford of Lee (now Tissington Ford) a chaplain called Elias lived by Bletch Brook. They likely would receive a toll at the crossing and bless the travellers. By 1225 Emma de Bradbourne confirmed the lease to Garendon Abbey of the land from the flats of Lee to the public common area of Bradbourne opposite the church. However, three years later she ended the lease and gave the land to the canons of Dunstable, who were by then residing in Bradbourne.

A community built up in around Lea Hall from the 1200s, with evidence of 24 crofts, and diverse trades such as a bakery and carpenter (crucial occupations for the mill) operating from there. By 1517 enclosure had taken place and no tax was being reported implying the area had become depopulated. William Bradborne passed it on with his other estates to Sir Humphrey Ferrers. In or before 1679, Samuel Swann of Hurdlow purchased it from the Ferrers. and leased out Gorsty Hill, a farm in what was by then Lea Hall manor. The manor passed to John Sanders of Basford in Nottinghamshire, whose wife was a sister and heiress of Swann. By the early 1800s, it too was the property of the FitzHerberts.

During the reign of Henry I, Tissington manor was given by the Ferrers family to the Savages, the co-heiresses of which married Meynell and Edensor and in turn whose heiress married into the Audley family (also known as Audeley). It was in moieties between Meynell and Audley, from 1275 until at least 1330. Meynell's ownership passed, by marriage, to the Francis family, whose heiress brought it to Nicholas, a younger son of John Fitzherbert, who was then of Somersal Herbert Hall. The other moiety came to the Herthulls (of Harthill, Derbyshire), and passed by marriage to the Cokaines; it was sold by them to Francis Fitzherbert towards the end of Queen Elizabeth's reign, the manor reunited under their ownership to the present day. Francis built Tissington Hall in 1609 and both he and son John served as High Sheriff of Derbyshire, along with later descendants.

A deer park was reported as existing locally in 1330, it was known as the 'parcum de Tyssington' and possibly created by William de Audley, although there were challenges to the ownership by various families around that period. Located south of Tissington village, the area was eventually disparked and named Bassett Wood in the 16th century, it is presently the location of a farm. Tissington has been an estate village for the Fitzherberts since the 1460s, and directly south of the road through it is the site of a possible depopulated area with small terraced platforms which housing could have been previously built upon. The field was eventually part of Yewtree Farm and adjoining cottage.

The custom of well dressing is thought to have originated from Celtic times, being at first simple floral arrangements or ribbons offering thanks to pagan gods for a stable water supply or its purity. Later this evolved into more elaborate displays of clay fronted boards with embedded flowers, which possibly begun in Tissington from the 14th century, although there are other Derbyshire places claiming the tradition started elsewhere. The popularity of this was variable during the next few centuries, with a sustained revival of the practice in place by the 18th century throughout certain places and counties. Today, the custom is celebrated as a week-long festival at Tissington attracting thousands of visitors.

After the dissolution of the monasteries, the Bradbourne church, its glebe, as well as its chapels became Crown property, but the Tissington endowments were bought prior to 1695 when William FitzHerbert passed them through trustees to both the bishop of the diocese and the lord of the manor of Tissington forever, which also paid for a curate, who was an unmarried cleric who would perform daily prayers in the FitzHerbert household, akin to a private chaplain, appointed by the bishop and the lord of the manor. Richard Graves was curate there for three years in the 18th century, writing his picaresque novel The Spiritual Quixote during this stay.

=== Late modern period to present ===
In 1643-1644 during the English Civil War, Tissington Hall was garrisoned by the FitzHerberts in support of Charles I, and a redoubt built to help defend the village, remains of which continue to exist. In 1777 the turnpike trust of the Ashbourne to Buxton route created four miles of improved road from Sandybrook in Offcote & Underwood parish, and ending close to New Inns, Newton Grange, passing through Tissington & Lea Hall parish past Tissington Gates. There had already been a road here indicated on Burdett's map of 1762—7, and the main road through Tissington and Lea up to that point indicated by Burdett was Gag Lane which ran parallel to and between the new road and the River Dove, and continues to exist today as a minor road.

As well as the ubiquitous agricultural workings, industry in the area included limestone processing, with associated quarry and kilns, particularly to the west in the Thorpe Pastures area, with others in Lea Hall and north of Tissington. Success and Rusheycliff mines were local lead ore interests to the north of Tissington. Woodeaves Mill was to the south east of the parish, and was built in 1784—1785. It was processing cotton using a steam engine and canal, and was owned for a time by John Tattersall but operations ceased by 1908. It continued to be used as a Stilton Cheese factory between 1910 and 1930 but since has been part-demolished and remaining buildings used for farming and residential purposes.

By the early Victorian era the parish was split with Tissington as a chapelry which had 537 inhabitants, while Lea Hall was a hamlet, both within the wider Bradbourne parish. From that period onwards the population reduced as villagers left for industrial work locally and in cities. Both after 1866 became parishes and the two areas continued to co-exist until 2009, when they were merged as Tissington and Lea Hall. A school was established in the late 18th century in Tissington by the road triangle at the heart of the village, it was rebuilt in 1837 with sponsorship from the FitzHerberts, it continues as a pre-school to the present day. Methodists established a church on Chapel Lane in 1866 erected in wood, the present building dates from 1955 and is in use to present.

The Ashbourne line was a 33^{1}/_{2} mi (53.9 km) railway from Buxton via Ashbourne to Uttoxeter. It was built by the London and North Western Railway using a section of the Cromford and High Peak Railway (C&HPR) and it joined the North Staffordshire Railway at Ashbourne. The railway ran through the parish and looped around Tissington village to the east within a cutting. Tissington railway station was built to the south of the village, it opened on 4 August 1899, however scheduled service on the line ended in 1954. The station closed with other stations along the line on 7 October 1963 and the line lifted in 1964.

The Peak National Park.was designated in 1951 as the first in the country and included all of the parish within its boundaries. In 1968, the former railway line was acquired by the Peak Park Joint Planning Board as part of a plan for a medium distance trail. The board removed the track bed, station buildings, platforms and other features as part of the refurbishment of the route. In 1971, the 13 mile Tissington Trail, named in honour of the village, opened for walkers, cyclists and horse riders.

Formerly, Tissington was reliant on arable farming but post-Industrial Revolution and Woodeaves Mill eras, the focus is on farming livestock. Change has also seen the more traditional agricultural dependency that Tissington Hall had as a key source of income dwindle, with the more recent incumbent of the house and heir to the baronet title, the FitzHerberts are using a variety of activities such as tours of the hall, visitor accommodation, hosting weddings and local events to appeal to tourists, writing articles in media, letting out farms and residences as well as through other means to maintain the substantial costs required for the upkeep of the estate.

== Governance ==
=== Local bodies ===
Tissington and Lea Hall parish is managed at the first level of public administration through a parish council.

At district level, the wider area is overseen by Derbyshire Dales district council. Derbyshire County Council provides the highest level strategic services locally.

=== Electoral representation ===
For electoral purposes, the parish is part of the Dovedale, Parwich and Brassington ward of Derbyshire Dales district, is within the Dovedale electoral division for Derbyshire county elections; and within the Derbyshire Dales parliamentary constituency.

== Demographics ==
=== Population ===
There are 134 residents recorded in total within Tissington and Lea Hall parish for the 2021 census, a decrease from 159 (-16%) of the 2011 census. The population majority in 2011 was mainly working age adults, with the 18-64 years age bracket taking up 63%. Infants to teenage years are a sizeable grouping of around 16%, with elderly residents (65 years and older) making up a slightly larger number (21%) of the parish population.

=== Labour market ===
During 2011, a substantial number of 16 years old locals and above are in some way performing regular work, with 67% classed as economically active. 10% are economically inactive, and 23% are reported as retired. A majority of residents' occupations are in skilled trade, elementary, associate professional, and managers, directors and seniors (59%).

=== Housing and mobility ===
72 residences existed throughout the parish in 2011 of which 6 had no usual occupants. The majority of housing stock is of the detached type (51%), then semi-detached (32%) or terraced (14%) and the remainder being flats, maisonettes or apartments in a shared or converted building (3%). The large majority of these (66%) are private rentals, with the bulk of other tenure being owner occupied (30%). The vast majority of households (91%) report having the use of a car or van.

== Community ==
=== Amenities and local economy ===
The parish has a number of publicly accessible facilities and commercial business activities, primarily based around the settlements and farms, predominantly in Tissington village. As well as agriculture prevalent throughout the rural areas, other business interests include a number of accommodation sites to cater to the local tourist scene. There are craft shops, a confectioners and a village butchers at Tissington which was a former slaughterhouse. A garden centre is to the immediate south of the village. There is a cafe is situated next to the Tissington Trail car park. The village hall is alongside the church. A motorhomes and caravan site is to the north of Tissington.

=== Events ===
These include annual festivals such as:

- Well dressing activities at six local wells, this runs for a week from Ascension Day in May-June
- Village open gardens in June
- Church fete in July
- National gardens scheme in August

A craft fair is held in the village hall every few weeks during the spring and summer months.

== Education ==
There is a kindergarten level school in Tissington, offering pre-school early learning opportunities and activities for 2 to 4 year olds, such as an outdoor-focused forest school, ballet & gymnastics.

== Landmarks ==
=== Conservation ===
==== Structural protections ====
===== Listed buildings =====
There are 41 items of national architectural merit throughout the parish, the vast majority of items at Grade II designation including much of the local building stock, but with Tissington Hall and St. Mary's Church at the next higher Grade II*.

===== Scheduled monuments =====
There are six ancient scheduled locations within the parish, including

- A number of barrows, including Basset Wood, Boars Low (also known as Bowers or Rose Low), Cromwell Low and Sharp Low
- The civil war redoubt in Tissington village
- A depopulated area around Lea Hall

==== Environmental designations ====
===== Conservation area =====
These are areas (usually urban or the core of a village) of special architectural or historic interest, the character of which is considered worthy of preservation or enhancement. It creates a precautionary approach to the loss or alteration of buildings and/or trees. There is one such local area defined in the parish, covering much of Tissington village up to the A515 road.

=== National park and tourism ===
The parish is completely within the southern reaches of the Peak District National Park, which is a well-regarded tourist region. The River Dove and the surrounding Dovedale makes up the western edge of the parish, and is a highly-visited area of the park. Further inland, an old railway route in the later 20th century was converted into the UK's first of its kind ramblers path named for the village Tissington Trail, which gets many users throughout the year. Attractive portions of the parish include the surrounding Bletch/Bradbourne/Bentley brooks along with landscaped fields and associated vistas. Tissington village is a feature in its own right, home to the 17th century Tissington Hall, which allows visitors on several open days, along with an inviting local area with scenic and wide views attracting a number of activities and events throughout the year. The Limestone Way long distance walking route enters the parish from Thorpe, runs along Washbrook Lane and The Avenue into the heart of Tissington, before exiting to the north east over fields across Chapel Lane, the Tissington Trail and Bletch Brook towards Parwich.

== Transport ==
=== Bus and community services ===
The parish is accessible by public transport, services travel between Ashbourne and Buxton. The 441 and 442 bus routes operated by High Peak Buses run along the A515 within the parish, but divert away to stops in Tissington. These are scheduled routes, with buses on hour intervals for some of the day, along with longer early evenings services throughout the week and on Saturdays.

== Religious sites ==
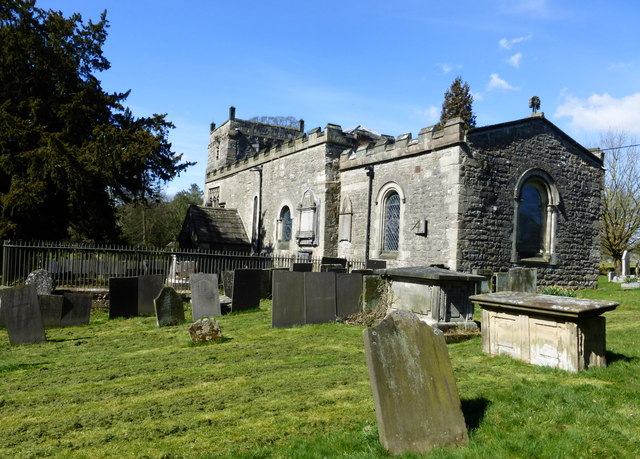
St Mary's, Tissington

St Mary's lies alongside the central road triangle of Tissington, and is directly across from Tissington Hall. It is aligned to the Anglican denomination, and was built during the Norman era. It maintains a doorway, tower and font from the period. There is a Methodist church hall on Chapel Lane which dates from the middle 20th century.

== Notable people ==
- Richard Graves, English minister and writer (1715–1804)
- Sir Richard Ranulph FitzHerbert, 9th Baronet, of Tissington Hall (born 1963) and ancestors
