= Listed buildings in Tissington and Lea Hall =

Tissington and Lea Hall is a civil parish in the Derbyshire Dales district of Derbyshire, England. The parish contains 41 listed buildings that are recorded in the National Heritage List for England. Of these, two are listed at Grade II*, the middle of the three grades, and the others are at Grade II, the lowest grade. The parish contains the village of Tissington and the surrounding countryside. Most of the listed buildings are houses, cottages and associated structures, farmhouses and farm buildings. The other listed buildings include four wells in the village, a church, a milestone, and a telephone kiosk.

== Key ==
Grade	Criteria
II*	Particularly important buildings of more than special interest
II	Buildings of national importance and special interest

== Buildings ==
Name and location	Photograph	Date	Notes	Grade
St Mary's Church; 53.06742°N 1.73805°W		12th century	The church has been altered and extended through the centuries, particularly in 1854 when the north aisle and clerestory were added. The church is built in limestone with gritstone dressings, the aisle roof is in lead, and the other roofs are slated. It consists of a nave with a clerestory, a north aisle, a south porch, a chancel and a west tower. The tower is Norman and has four stages, stepped buttresses, square bell openings in the top stage, a gargoyle, dentilled corbels, and a plain parapet. The south doorway is also Norman, and the south side of the church is embattled.	II*
Stable block, Tissington Hall; 53.06777°N 1.74051°W		16th century (probable)	The stable block, which was altered in the 18th century, is in limestone with gritstone dressings, and a stone slate roof with coped gables and a bellcote with open sides and a weathervane by Robert Bakewell. There are two storeys, four bays, and a gabled cross-wing on the left. On the east front are two doorways with moulded surrounds, and four oculi with moulded surrounds and keystones. In the upper floor are five four-light mullioned windows, and over the middle two bays is a pediment containing a clock face in moulded surround. The cross-wing contains a large round-arched carriage entrance with imposts and a keystone.	II
Gate piers, walls, gateway and gates, Tissington Hall; 53.06815°N 1.74018°W		c. 1625	The gate piers, walls, and gateway are in limestone and sandstone. The gateway has a single round-headed arch with keystones and quoins, and is surmounted by a balustrade on a chamfered parapet with three ball finials. The iron gates dating from the early 18th century are by Robert Bakewell. The gate piers have a square plan and ball finials, and the walls are coped and stepped.	II
Tissington Hall; 53.06810°N 1.74078°W		Early 17th century	A large house that was refronted in about 1795 and extended in 1906, it is in limestone with sandstone dressings. The east front has two storeys and five bays, string courses and a parapet. In the centre is a porch with a round-arched doorway, and the windows are mullioned and transomed. Recessed to the southwest are two three-storey bays, recessed to the north are four bays, linking with the 1906 block that has two storeys, four bays, and two full height canted bay windows.	II*
Lea Hall Farmhouse; 53.06330°N 1.71111°W		17th century	The farmhouse is in limestone with gritstone dressings, quoins, a coved eaves band, and a hipped roof mainly in tile with some stone slate. There are two storeys, and an L-shaped plan with a front range of three bays. The central doorway has a quoined surround, a four-centred arch and a chamfered lintel. The windows either have a single light, or are mullioned.	II
Bent Farmhouse and barn 53.06706°N 1.72390°W		Late 17th century	The farmhouse and attached barn are in limestone with gritstone dressings, and a tile roof with stone coped gables, and two storeys. The farmhouse contains mullioned windows with casements, and a doorway with a quoined surround and a bracketed hood. To the right is a conservatory and the barn, which dates from the 19th century. The barn contains three doorways with quoined surrounds, a larger doorway and a circular window, and in the upper floor are three square openings.	II
Church House and wall 53.06695°N 1.73806°W		Late 17th century	The house is in limestone with gritstone dressings, and a tile roof with stone coped gables and kneelers. There are two storeys and attics, and three bays. On the front is a doorway, most of the windows are mullioned with casements, and there is a sash window. At the front of the garden is a dry stone wall.	II
Town Head Farmhouse, wall and railings 53.06959°N 1.74257°W		Late 17th century	The house, which was extended in the 18th century, is in limestone with gritstone dressings, chamfered quoins, a moulded eaves cornice, and a tile roof with stone coped gables and plain kneelers. There are two storeys and attics, and a front of five bays. The doorway has a fanlight and a flat bracketed hood. The windows in the earlier part either have single lights or are mullioned, and in the later part they are sashes with moulded surrounds. At the front of the garden is a dry stone wall with metal railings.	II
Fern Cottage and Jasmine Cottage; 53.06671°N 1.73908°W		Early 18th century	A pair of cottages in limestone with gritstone dressings, a tile roof, and two storeys. Each cottage has a doorway with a plain lintel, and the windows are mullioned.	II
Barn, Lea Hall Farm; 53.06409°N 1.71118°W		Early 18th century	The barn is in limestone with gritstone dressings, quoins, and a tile roof with stone coped gables, moulded kneelers, and finials. There are two storeys, and the west front contains three stable doors, three square windows, and a square opening in the upper floor with a quoined surround and a chamfered lintel. To the east and west are brick extensions.	II
Hands Well; 53.06937°N 1.74136°W		18th century	The well is in gritstone and consists of an oval basin sete into a wall. The pedestal tapers in the middle and widens at the base.	II
Old Vicarage and wall 53.06699°N 1.73924°W		Mid-18th century	The vicarage, which was extended in the 19th century, is in limestone with gritstone dressings, a moulded eaves cornice, and a tile roof. There are two storeys and attics, and a front of three bays, with a two-bay extension to the right. In the centre of the original part is a doorway with a bracketed pediment. The extension contains a canted bay window, and the other windows are sashes with moulded surrounds. In the roof are two gabled dormers, and the garden is enclosed by a dry stone wall with curved copings.	II
Town Well; 53.06683°N 1.73670°W		18th century (possible)	The well in The Green is a stone structure that has limestone side slabs and a gabled gritstone slab roof.	II
Wibbern Hill Farmhouse and wall 53.06707°N 1.73694°W		18th century	The farmhouse is in limestone with gritstone dressings, and a tile roof with stone coped gables and plain kneelers. There are two storeys, a double pile plan, and four bays. The doorway has a massive quoined surround and a lintel. Above the doorway is a Gothic window with two pointed lancets in a pointed arch. The other windows are mullioned with two lights, and along the road is a dry stone garden wall.	II
Yew Tree Well; 53.06678°N 1.73934°W		18th century (possible)	The well in The Avenue is in limestone. It is a low structure with two stone piers and a flat stone slab roof.	II
Hall Cottages; 53.06917°N 1.74091°W		Late 18th century	A pair of cottages in limestone with a tile roof. There are two storeys and four bays. Each cottage has a central doorway with a flat hood on gritstone brackets, and the windows are horizontally-sliding sashes.	II
Hall Well; 53.06787°N 1.73939°W		Late 18th century (probable)	The well is in limestone with gritstone dressings. It consists of a semicircular arch with plain imposts and raised outer moulding, and behind is a half dome. Inside there is a flat plinth, and the well has a small semicircular arch, the water passing into a broad bowl.	II
Lees Farmhouse; 53.05175°N 1.72838°W		Late 18th century	The farmhouse is in limestone with gritstone dressings and a tile roof. There are two storeys and two bays. The doorway has a chamfered surround and a bracketed hood, and the windows are mullioned with two casements.	II
Overfield Farmhouse; 53.06944°N 1.74151°W		Late 18th century	The farmhouse is in limestone with gritstone dressings, and a tile roof with stone coped gables and kneelers. There are two storeys and an asymmetrical front. The doorway has a quoined surround and a rectangular fanlight. The windows are mullioned, in the upper floor are gabled dormers, and all the windows are casements.	II
Sharplow Farmhouse and outbuildings 53.07022°N 1.75349°W		Late 18th century	The farmhouse is in limestone with gritstone dressings, quoins and a tile roof. There are two storeys and attics, and five bays. In the centre is a gabled porch, and the windows either have a single light or are mullioned. To the right is a lower outbuilding with a gabled porch.	II
Shaws Farmhouse; 53.07780°N 1.73221°W		Late 18th century	The farmhouse is in limestone with dressings in gritstone and Staffordshire sandstone, and a tile roof with stone coped gables and kneelers. There are two storeys and attics, and on the front are doorways with quoined surrounds and lintels, one of which is blocked. Most of the windows are mullioned, some with hood moulds, there is one single-light window, and a circular window.	II
The Old School House; 53.06670°N 1.73818°W		Late 18th century (probable)	A school and master's house, later used for other purposes, it is in limestone with gritstone dressings, and a tile roof with stone coped gables and kneelers. There is a single storey at the north end, two storeys as the ground slopes to the south, and an L-shaped plan. Facing the road is a Tudor-style canted bay window. The porch in the left return has rusticated pilasters and a parapet, the middle section of which is raised with a coat of arms. The doorway has a chamfered surround and a hood mould, and above it is a datestone. On the roof is a lead-covered bellcote.	II
Gate piers, Buxton to Ashbourne Road; 53.06319°N 1.74608°W		1813	The gate piers at the entrance to The Avenue from the Buxton to Ashbourne Road (A515 road) are in stone with a square plan. There are four piers, two flanking the carriageway, and two lower outer ones with a pedestrian way between. The piers are rusticated, with entablatures and concave pyramidal caps.	II
Dilcroft and wall 53.06716°N 1.73662°W		Early 19th century	The house is in limestone with gritstone dressings and a tile roof. There are two storeys, five bays, and a single-storey lean-to on the left. The doorway is in the centre, the windows are mullioned, and there is a gabled dormer. The front garden is enclosed by a dry stone wall with curved copings.	II
Outbuildings southeast of Bent Farmhouse; 53.06694°N 1.72359°W	—	Early 19th century	The outbuildings are in limestone with gritstone dressings and hipped tile roofs. Mainly in a single storey, there is a two-storey block at the south end, and a single-storey lean-to. The openings are irregular, and there is a circular window in the south front.	II
Slaughter House; 53.06779°N 1.73585°W		Early 19th century	A shop in limestone with gritstone dressings, and a tile roof with stone coped gables and moulded kneelers. There is a single storey, and it contains a central doorway with a lintel and jambs. To its left is a rectangular shop window, and to the right is a louvred opening and a doorway.	II
Darfield House and wall 53.06788°N 1.73570°W		1834	The house is in limestone with gritstone dressings, and a tile roof with stone coped gables and kneelers. There are two storeys, a double depth plan, and a front of three bays. The central doorway has a bracketed hood, and the windows are mullioned, those in the ground floor with hood moulds. Between the upper floor windows is a date plaque, and the front gardens are enclosed by a dry stone wall with curved copings.	II
House and outbuilding south of slaughter house 53.067605°N 1.735854°W		1836	A house and outbuilding in limestone with sandstone dressings, and a tile rood with coped gables and moulded kneelers. The house has two storeys, with a single-storey outbuilding. The doorway has a stone lintel and jambs, as does the window above. To the right, there are two cart entrances with massive impost slabs and massive lintels. The gable has an 1863 datestone.	II
Darfield Cottages; 53.06612°N 1.73525°W		1840	A terrace of three cottages in limestone with gritstone dressings, a dentilled eaves cornice, and a stone slate roof with stone coped gables, moulded kneelers, and finials. There are two storeys and five bays. At each end is a single-storey porch with a Tudor arched doorway. On the front are a doorway with a Tudor arch and a datestone above, and mullioned windows. The ground floor openings have hood moulds.	II
Sycamore House; 53.06770°N 1.73537°W		1844	The house is in limestone with gritstone dressings, and a stone slate roof with stone coped gables and moulded kneelers. There are two storeys and an L-shaped plan with three bays, the left bay projecting and gabled. The doorway has a bracketed segmental-arched hood, and above it is a datestone. The windows are mullioned with casements.	II
Highway Close; 53.06945°N 1.74103°W		1846	The house is in limestone with gritstone dressings, and a stone slate roof with stone coped gables and moulded kneelers. There are two storeys, two bays, and a single-storey wing on the left. The central doorway has a quoined surround and a lintel with a four-centred arch. The windows are mullioned, those in the ground floor with hood moulds, and between the upper floor windows is a dated plaque.	II
1–3 The Green; 53.06711°N 1.73726°W		Mid-19th century	A terrace of three cottages in limestone with tile roofs, stone coped gables and plain kneelers. There are two storeys and a symmetrical front of four bays. Each doorway has a bracketed hood, and the windows are casements, those in the ground floor with segmental heads.	II
Barn north east of the old Vicarage; 53.06736°N 1.73918°W		Mid-19th century	The barn is in limestone with gritstone dressings, and a tile roof with stone coped gables. In the centre is a doorway with a quoined surround, to its left is a circular opening with a square opening above, to its right is a cart shed entrance with a segmental head, and further to the right are two cart sheds with flat lintels.	II
Lime kiln 53.07004°N 1.76910°W		Mid-19th century	The lime kiln is in limestone with brick dressings. It is 11 feet (3.4 m) high and 15 feet (4.6 m) deep, and has a U-shaped plan. The front is concave with broad pilasters and a string course. The draw hole is 9 feet (2.7 m) wide and has a segmental arch.	II
Rose Cottage; 53.06804°N 1.73573°W		Mid-19th century	The cottage is in limestone with gritstone dressings and a tile roof. There are two storeys, two bays, and a single-storey extension to the north. The central doorway has a rectangular fanlight, and the windows are mullioned with two casements.	II
Lodge, The Avenue; 53.06345°N 1.74607°W		Mid-19th century	The lodge is in limestone with gritstone dressings, quoins, an eaves band with a dentil-like motif and low crenellations, and a tile roof with stone coped gables and moulded kneelers. There are two storeys, and the windows are mullioned with hood moulds.	II
Yew Tree Cottage; 53.06668°N 1.73927°W		1861	The cottage is in limestone with gritstone dressings, and a tile roof with plain and stone coped gables and kneelers. There are two storeys and a T-shaped plan, with a front range of two bays. In the centre is a doorway, and the windows are mullioned with diamond and octagonal patterned glazing bars. Between the upper floor windows is a datestone.	II
Garden terraces, walls and piers, Tissington Hall; 53.06799°N 1.74114°W		Late 19th century	The terraces, walls and piers are in limestone with gritstone dressings. The walls have flat copings, and, with steps, enclose a formal garden. The piers are square, and have ball finials.	II
Staff quarters and outbuilding, Tissington Hall; 53.06750°N 1.74013°W		c. 1905	The building, which has Arts and Crafts features, is in limestone with gritstone dressings, and has a tile roof on which are two domed cupolas with wooden columns and finials. There is a single storey and attics, with ranges around three sides of a courtyard. On the east front are two projecting gabled bays, the left bay with a canted bay window. The other windows are mullioned.	II
Telephone kiosk 53.06743°N 1.73581°W		1935	The K6 type telephone kiosk in Chapel Lane was designed by Giles Gilbert Scott. Constructed in cast iron with a square plan and a dome, it has three unperforated crowns in the top panels.	II
Milestone; 53.06609°N 1.71919°W		Undated	The milestone is in gritstone, it has a square plan, and is about 3 feet (0.91 m) high. It is inscribed with the distances to London, Tissington, Hopton and Matlock Bath, and on the south side are Roman numerals.	II
