= Sir William FitzHerbert, 1st Baronet =

Sir William Fitzherbert Bt
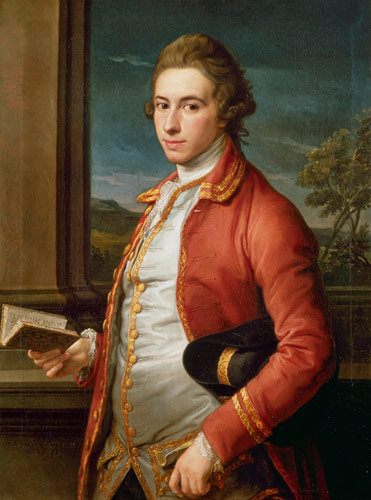
- Portrait by Pompeo Batoni, c.1768, Tissington Hall, Derbyshire
- Born: 1748; Derbyshire
- Died: 1791; England
- Education: St John's College, Cambridge
- Occupation: Lawyer
- Spouse: Sarah Perrin (m. 1778)
- Children: 2
- Parent(s): William Fitzherbert; Mary Fitzherbert

Sir William FitzHerbert, 1st Baronet (27 May 1748 - 30 July 1791) was an English lawyer and courtier. Born in Derbyshire, he served as Gentleman Usher to George III and was granted a baronetcy. FitzHerbert also owned a number of slave plantations in the British colony of Jamaica which he inherited via his marriage with Jamaican heiress Sarah Perrin.

== Biography ==
Fitzherbert was born 27 May 1748 to William Fitzherbert, Member of Parliament for Derby, and Mary Fitzherbert of Tissington Hall. He attended Westminster School and St John's College, Cambridge, graduating M.A. in 1770. He toured Europe with his neighbour William Cavendish, later fifth Duke of Devonshire, when they were both about twenty. After leaving Paris they visited the major cities of Italy, including Rome and Florence, where Fitzherbert commissioned portraits of himself and his companion from Thomas Patch and Pompeo Batoni respectively.

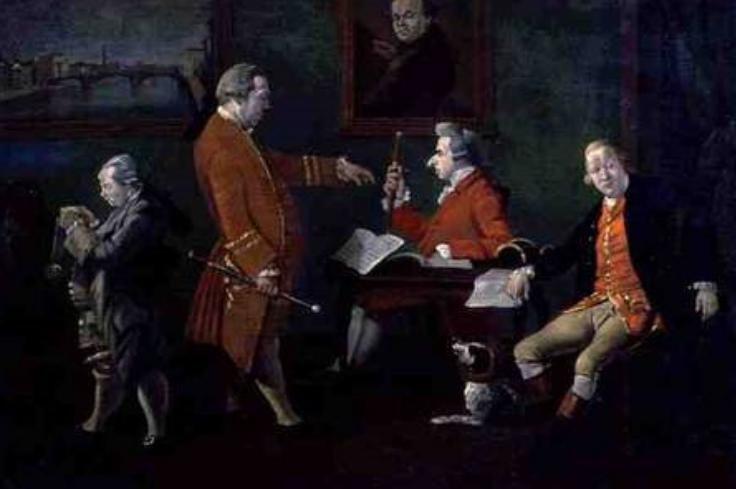
Fitzherbert with the 5th Duke of Devonshire ca. 1780, by Thomas Patch

He served as Gentleman Usher to George III and was rewarded with portraits of the king and queen. Fitzherbert became a baronet on 22 January 1784 and retired to the family seat of Tissington Hall. On his death in 1791 he was buried at Tissington and was succeeded by Anthony Perrin Fitzherbert his son with Sarah, his wife. William's younger brother Alleyne FitzHerbert was a diplomat who became Baron St Helens in 1791.

Anthony Fitzherbert, the second Baronet, died suddenly on 2 April 1798 of a "sudden consumption" at the age of nineteen. He was succeeded by Henry, his brother, second son of the first Baronet.

== Family ==
On 14 October 1777 he married Sarah Perrin in London and through her inherited five slave plantations in Jamaica. These were four sugar plantations of Blue Mountain, Forest, Grange Hill and Vere and the coffee plantation of Retrieve Mountain. They had two children:

- Sir Anthony Perrin FitzHerbert 2nd Bt (21 Jul 1779 - 2 Apr 1798). Died unmarried.
- Sir Henry FitzHerbert 3rd Bt (4 Aug 1783 - 1 Jun 1858). Married Agnes Beresford, daughter of Rev William Beresford on 27 December 1805. Had issue.

Coat of arms of Sir William FitzHerbert, 1st Baronet
Crest A dexter hand erect in an open gauntlet all Proper. Motto Ung Je Serviray (One Will I Serve)

== Major works ==
- Maxims and Reflections (1784)
- Short Enquiry into showing the origin and ancient privileges of Knights Banneret (1779)

Baronetage of Great Britain
New creation	Baronet (of Tissington); 1784–1791	Succeeded by Anthony FitzHerbert
