= Tissington =

Village in Derbyshire, England

Coordinates: 53.07°N 1.74°W

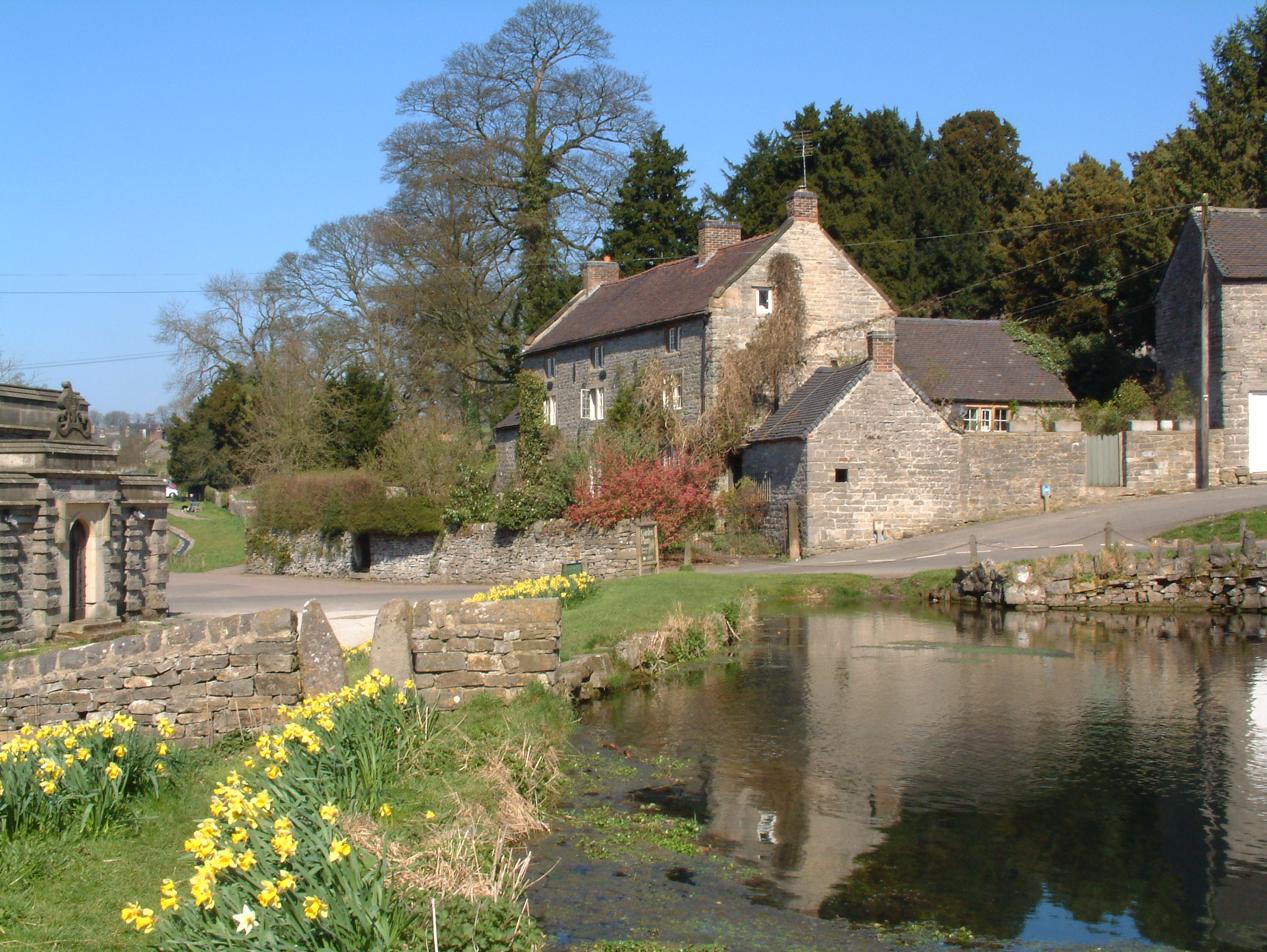
- Tissington Pond

- Location within Derbyshire
- Population: 158 (2001)
- OS grid reference: SK176523
- Civil parish: Tissington and Lea Hall
- District: Derbyshire Dales
- Shire county: Derbyshire
- Region: East Midlands
- Country: England
- Sovereign state: United Kingdom
- Post town: ASHBOURNE
- Postcode district: DE6
- Dialling code: 01335
- Police: Derbyshire
- Fire: Derbyshire
- Ambulance: East Midlands
- UK Parliament: Derbyshire Dales

Tissington is a village and former civil parish, now in the parish of Tissington and Lea Hall, in the Derbyshire Dales district of Derbyshire, England. In 2001 the parish had a population of 158. The population "Tissington and Lea Hall" at the 2011 census was 159. It is part of the estate of Tissington Hall, owned by the FitzHerbert family since 1465. It is a popular tourist attraction, particularly during its well dressing week. It also gives its name to the Tissington Trail, a 13-mile (21 km) walk and cycle path which passes nearby. The Limestone Way, another long-distance path and bridleway, passes through the village itself.

== History ==
Tissington (Old English "Tidsige's farm/settlement") is recorded in the Domesday Book of 1086 as Tizinctun, having been given to Henry de Ferrers by the king, William the Conqueror:

"In Tizinctun Ulchel, Edric, Ganel, Uluiet, Wictric, Leuric, Godwin had 4 carucates of land for geld. Land for 4 ploughs. Now in the demesne there [are] 3 ploughs: and 12 villanes, and 8 bordars having 4 ploughs, and 1 mill of 3 shillings [value]; and 30 acres (12 ha) of meadow. Underwood 1-mile (1.6 km) in length and 4 furlongs (800 m) in breadth. In the time of King Edward it was worth £4, now 40 shillings"

During the reign of Henry I the estate passed to the Savage family. After the death of the last male heir, William le Savage in 1259 it was split between the families of the joint heiresses, the Meynells and Edensors. The Meynell's part of the estate was acquired in marriage by Nicholas FitzHerbert in the 1460s. During the reign of Elizabeth I, Francis, the great-grandson of Nicholas, purchased the remainder from the heirs of Edensors. From then the village and estate has been wholly in the ownership of the FitzHerbert family.

During the Civil War a redoubt or siegework was constructed on the hill north of the church. The buried and earthwork remains are protected as a Scheduled Monument. Tissington Hall was garrisoned for the King by its owner, Colonel Fitzherbert in December 1643.

As of March 2021, and since 1989, the owner of the village was Sir Richard FitzHerbert, 9th Baronet who resides at Tissington Hall. In an interview, he said that 45 of the properties were rented out and that tenants farmed the 2,000 acres around the Hall which operates some corporate events and weddings.

On 1 April 2009 the parish was abolished and merged with Lea Hall to form "Tissington & Lea Hall".

== Notable buildings ==
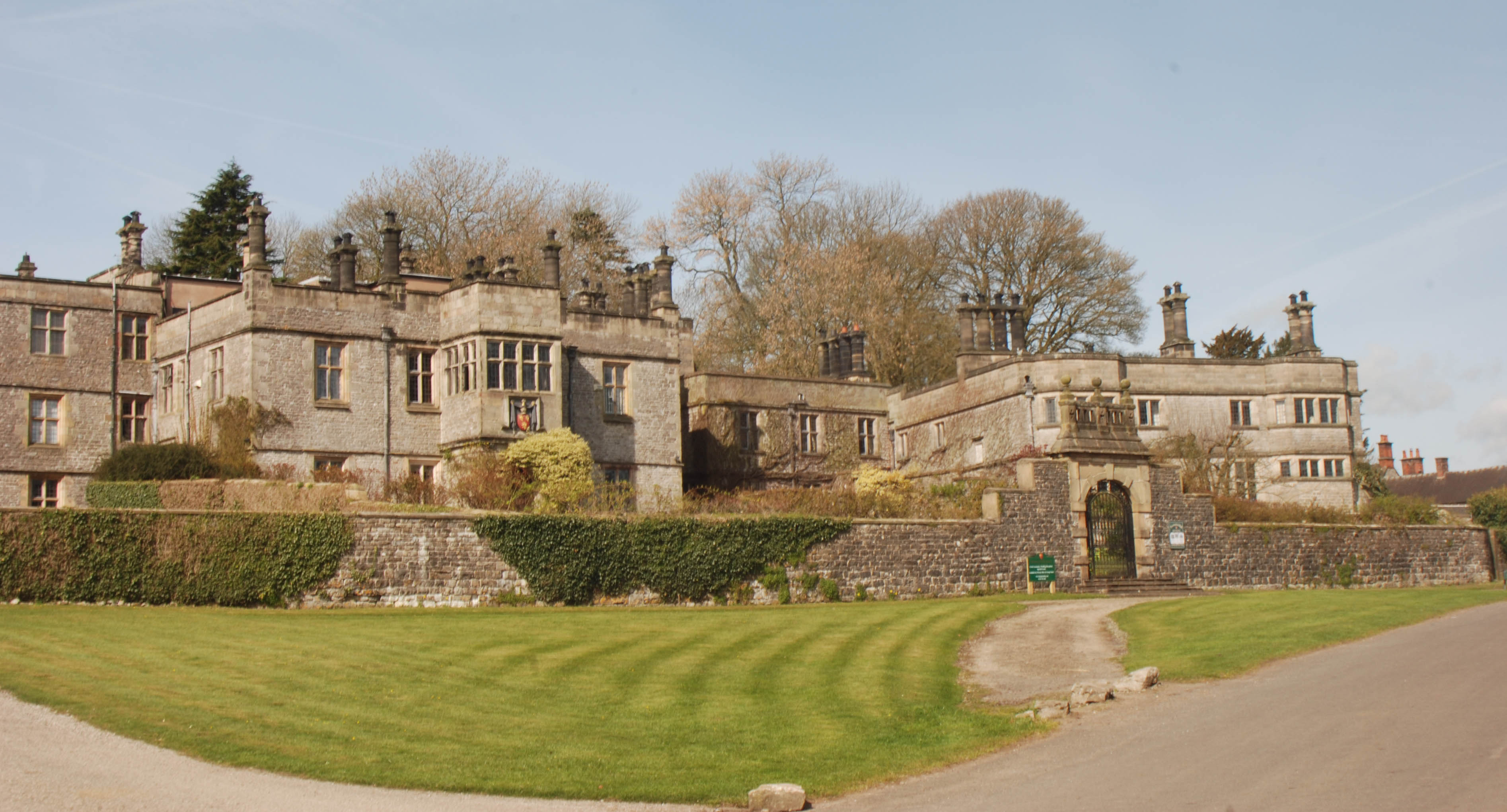
The Hall

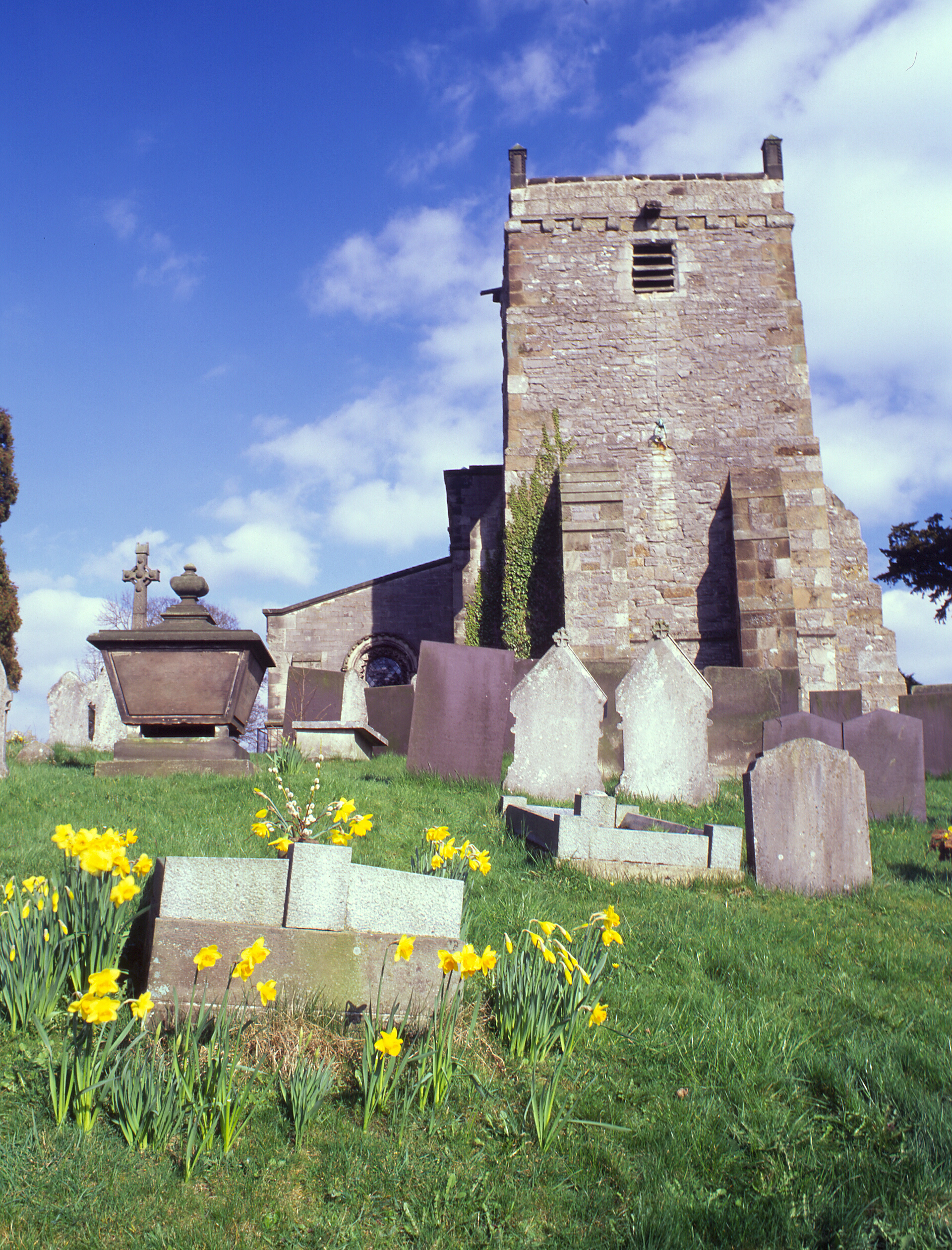
The Church

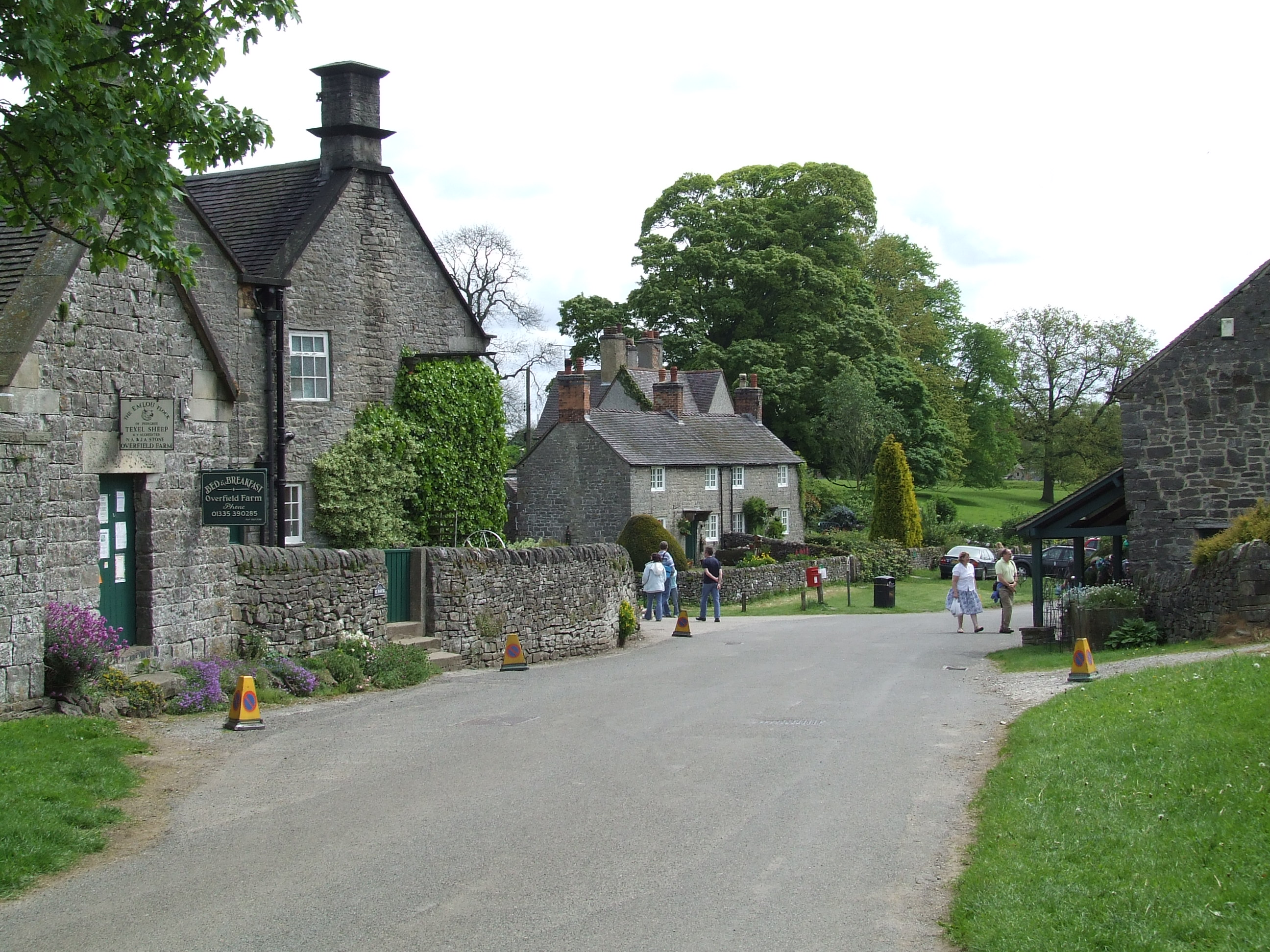
Typical cottages

In the centre of the village is Tissington Hall, the seat of the FitzHerberts. A Jacobean building built in 1609 by Francis FitzHerbert, replacing an earlier moated manor house, it is a Grade II* listed building. The owner was awarded the Bledisloe Gold Medal "for estate management by the Royal Agricultural Society" in 2006.

The parish church of St Mary opposite the hall has a Norman tower and font. The font is thought to depict a scene from the legend of Saint Beorhthelm of Stafford.

The majority of the other buildings in the village are built in the local vernacular style, of which around 70% are listed buildings.

== Well dressings ==
An estimated 50,000 people visit the village to view its well dressings each year. Six wells (Children's Well, Coffin Well, Hall Well, Hands Well, Town Well and Yew Tree Well) are decorated during the week of Ascension Sunday with pictures formed by pressing flower petals and other organic materials into a clay substrate. The pictures are usually on a Biblical theme reflecting current events or anniversaries. This tradition is often cited to date back at least to 1348, following the village’s escape from the Black Death, which the villagers attributed to the purity of the water in its wells.

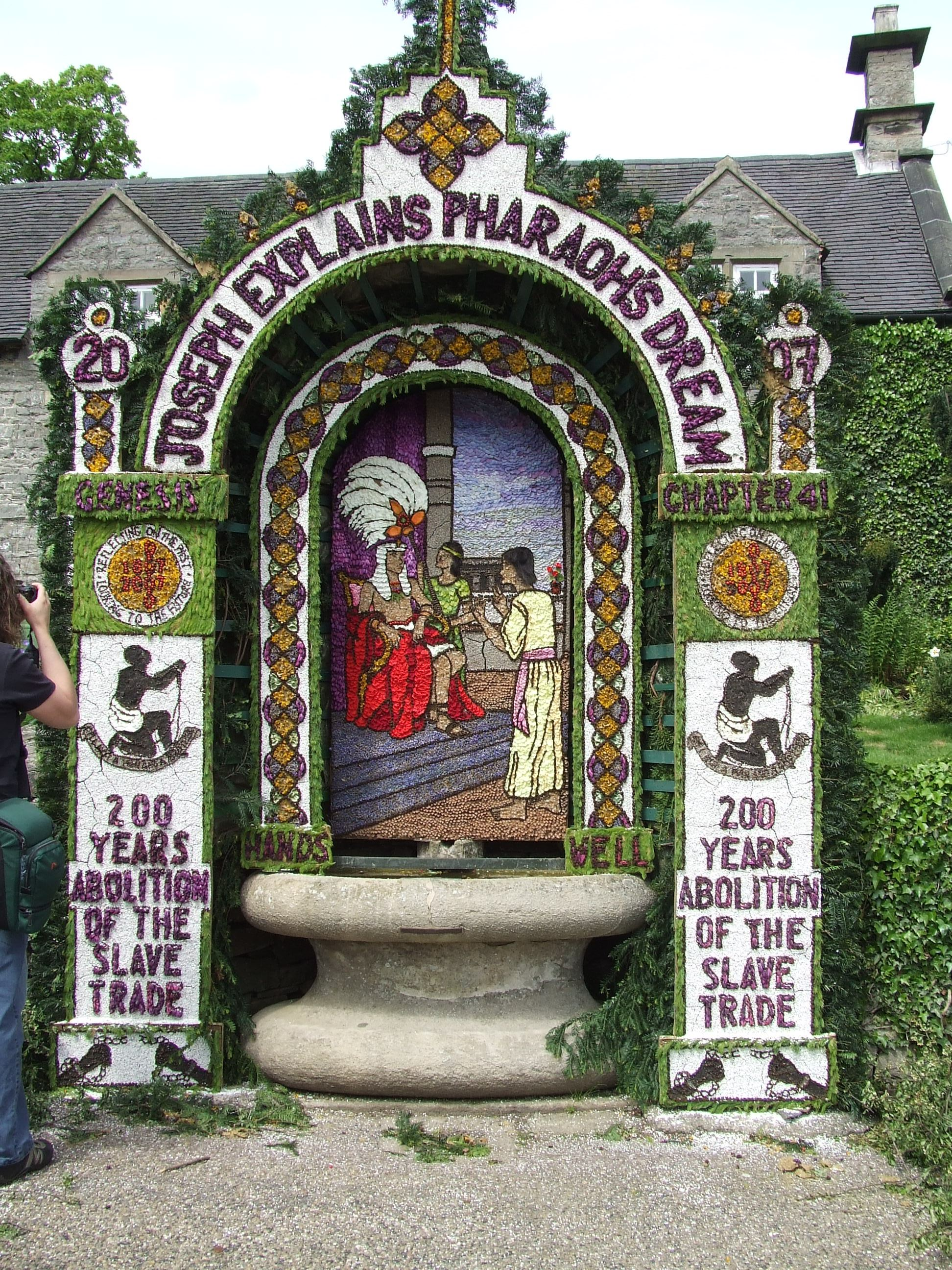
A dressed well in 2007

== Literary connections ==
Richard Graves wrote some of his novel The Spiritual Quixote whilst staying in Tissington.

== See also ==
- Listed buildings in Tissington and Lea Hall
