= St Mary's Church, Tissington =

St Mary’s Church, Tissington
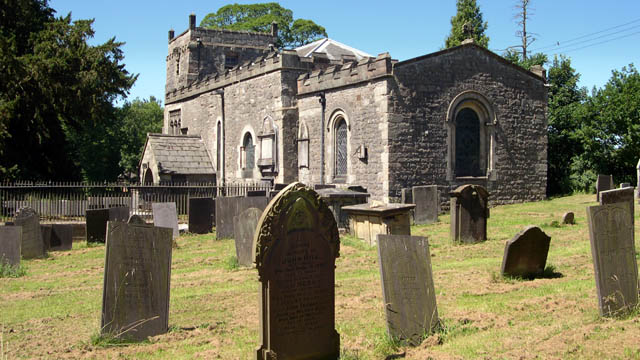
- St Mary’s Church, Tissington
- St Mary’s Church, Tissington
- 53°04′2.9″N 1°44′15.36″W
- Location: Tissington
- Country: England
- Denomination: Church of England
- Website: Peak Seven

History
- Dedication: St Mary

Architecture
- Heritage designation: Grade II* listed

Administration
- Diocese: Diocese of Derby
- Archdeaconry: Derby
- Deanery: Ashbourne
- Parish: Tissington

St Mary’s Church, Tissington is a Grade II* listed parish church in the Church of England in Tissington, Derbyshire.

== History ==
The church dates from the 12th century, and the chancel and south porch still date from this time. The doorway has a Norman tympanum with two standing sculpted figures. The church was restored in 1854 when a new aisle was added on the north side.

== Parish status ==
The church is a member of the Peak Seven group of churches along with:

- St Michael and All Angels’ Church, Alsop-en-le-Dale
- St Thomas's Church, Biggin
- St Edmund’s Church, Fenny Bentley
- St Giles Church, Hartington
- St Peter's Church, Parwich
- St Leonard’s Church, Thorpe

== Memorials ==
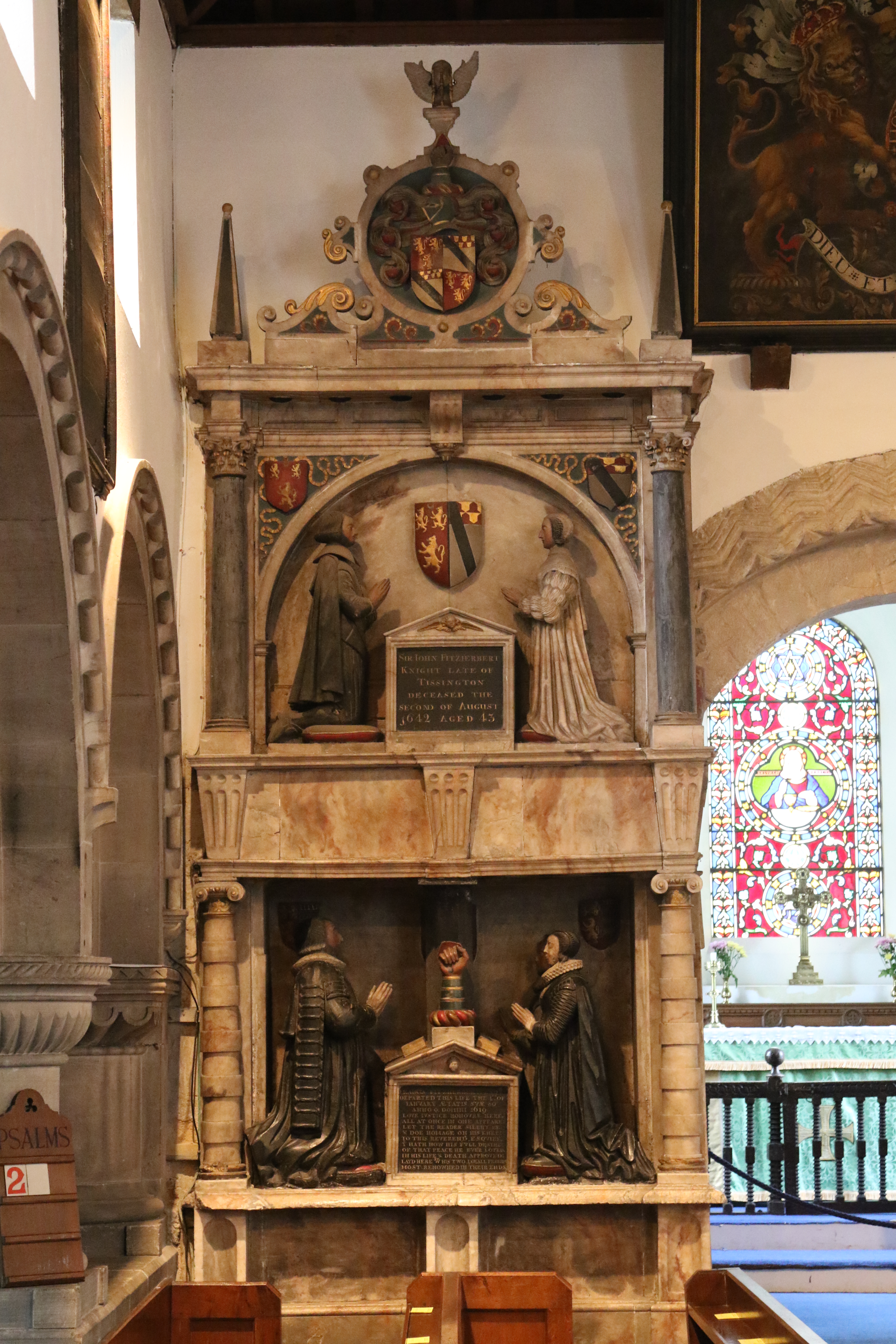
Memorial to Francis FitzHerbert and Sir John FitzHerbert

- Francis FitzHerbert (d. 1619)
- Sir John FitzHerbert (d.1643)
- Frank Richard Allsop (d.1912), died on Titanic.

== Organ ==
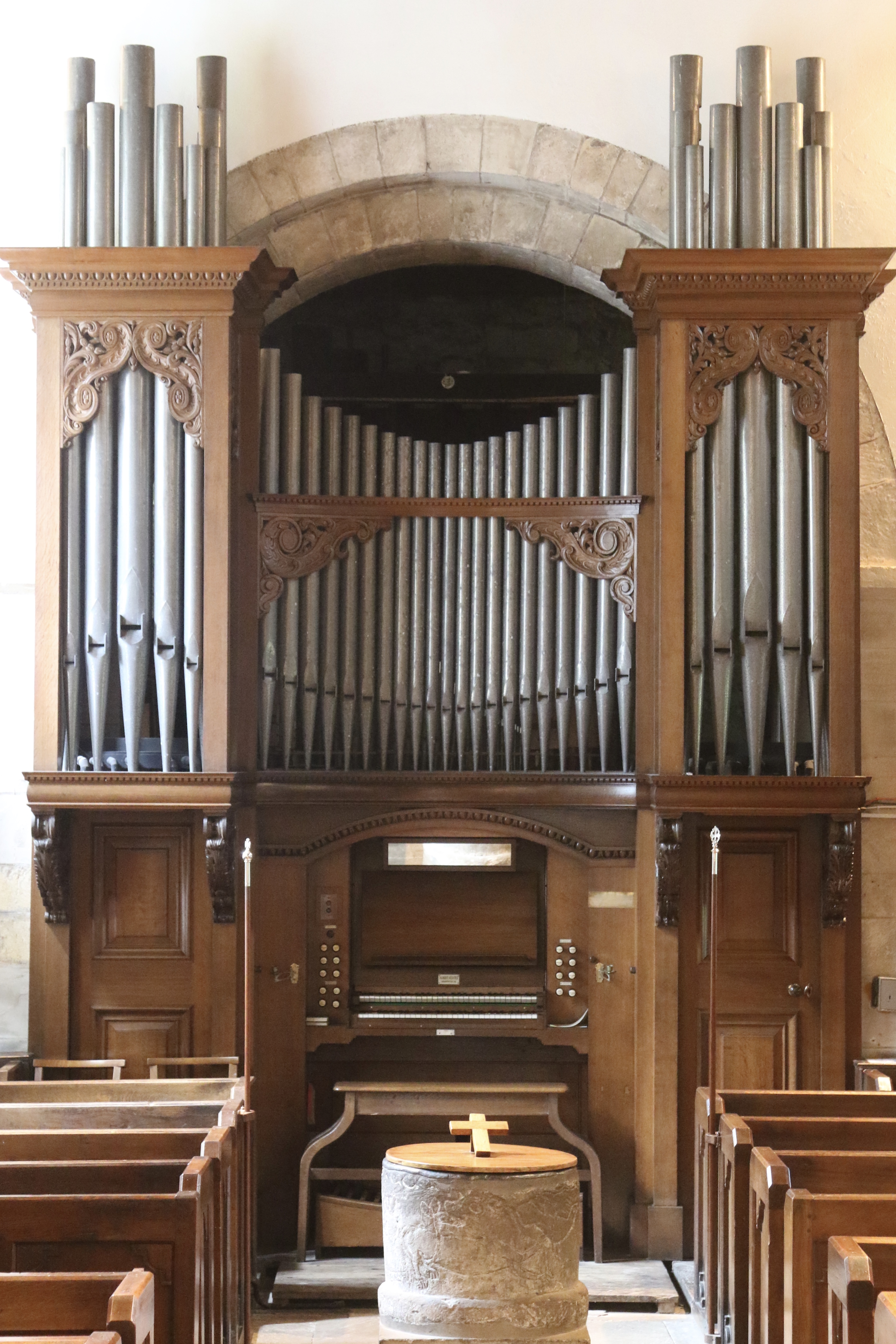
The organ

The church contains a pipe organ by Albert Keates of Sheffield. A specification of the organ can be found on the National Pipe Organ Register.

== See also ==
- Grade II* listed buildings in Derbyshire Dales
- Listed buildings in Tissington and Lea Hall
