= FitzHerbert baronets =

Title in the Baronetage of Great Britain

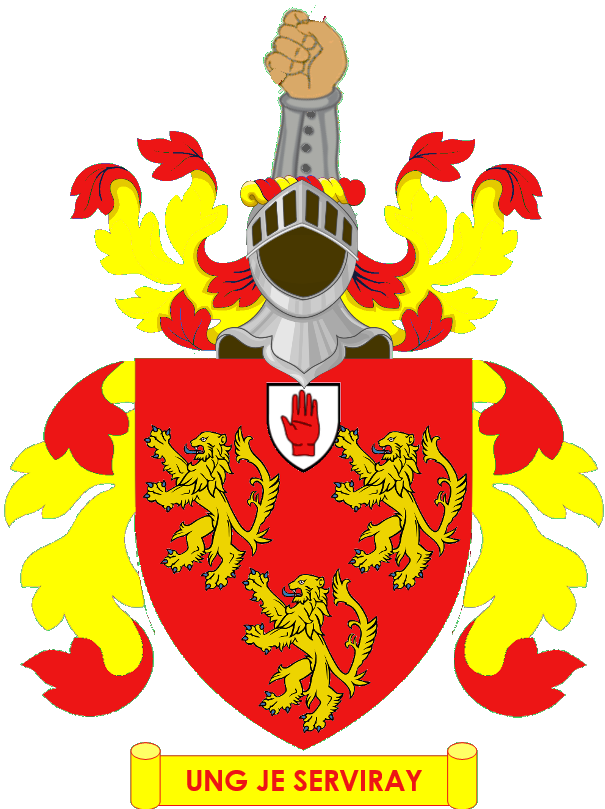
- Crest: A dexter hand erect in an open gauntlet all Proper.
- Shield: Gules three lions rampant Or.
- Motto: Ung Je Serviray (One Will I Serve)

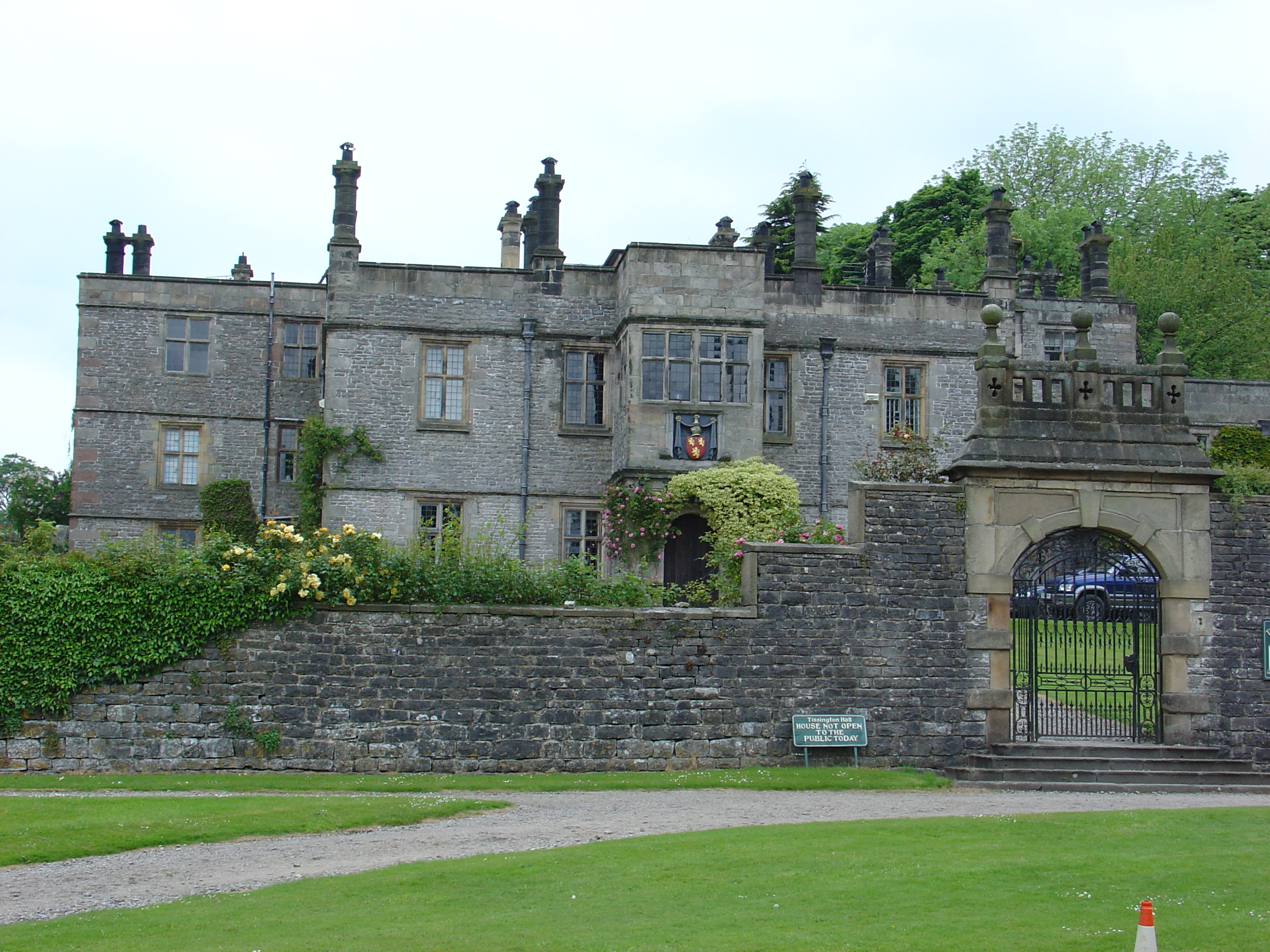
Tissington Hall, seat of the Tissington FitzHerberts since the 15th century

The FitzHerbert baronetcy, of Tissington in the County of Derby, is a title in the Baronetage of Great Britain. It was created on 22 January 1784 for William FitzHerbert, of Tissington Hall, Derbyshire.

Successive baronets served as High Sheriff of Derbyshire in 1815, 1865, 1866 and 1940.

== Fitzherbert family history ==
The FitzHerberts descend from a Norman knight, Herbert, whose son was known by the patronymic filius Herberti in Latin and fils de Herbert in Norman French. They are related to the FitzHerberts of Swynnerton Hall, Staffordshire (see Baron Stafford).

In 1125, William Fitz-Herbert was granted the tenancy of Norbury Manor in Norbury, Derbyshire. Nicholas FitzHerbert and his son Ralph purchased it from the priory in 1444. The senior male line of the family held the manor until selling it in 1881. The original charter from King Henry III of England in 1125 has survived.

== FitzHerbert baronets, of Tissington (1784) ==
- Sir William FitzHerbert, 1st Baronet (1748–1791)
- Sir Anthony Perrin FitzHerbert, 2nd Baronet (1779–1798)
- Sir Henry FitzHerbert, 3rd Baronet (1783–1858)
- Sir William FitzHerbert, 4th Baronet (1808–1896)
- Sir Richard FitzHerbert, 5th Baronet (1846–1906)
- Sir Hugo Meynell FitzHerbert, 6th Baronet (1872–1934)
- Sir William FitzHerbert, 7th Baronet (1874–1963)
- Sir John Richard Frederick FitzHerbert, 8th Baronet (1913–1989), son of Henry FitzHerbert, Archdeacon of Derby, a younger son of the 5th Baronet
- Sir Richard Ranulph FitzHerbert, 9th Baronet (born 1963)

The heir to the baronetcy is the present holder's son, Frederick David FitzHerbert (born 1995).

The document collection of the FitzHerbert family of Tissington is held by the Derbyshire Record Office.

== Extended family ==
Alleyne, a younger brother of the 1st Baronet, was created Baron St Helens in 1791 (Peerage of Ireland) and in 1801 (Peerage of the United Kingdom).

Baronetage of Great Britain
Preceded by Wood baronets	FitzHerbert baronets of Tissington; 22 January 1784	Succeeded by Beevor baronets
