= Geology of the Peak District National Park =

The geology of the Peak District National Park in England is dominated by a thick succession of faulted and folded sedimentary rocks of Carboniferous age. The Peak District is often divided into a southerly White Peak where Carboniferous Limestone outcrops and a northerly Dark Peak where the overlying succession of sandstones and mudstones dominate the landscape. The scarp and dip slope landscape which characterises the Dark Peak also extends along the eastern and western margins of the park. Although older rocks are present at depth, the oldest rocks which are to be found at the surface in the national park are dolomitic limestones of the Woo Dale Limestone Formation seen where Woo Dale enters Wye Dale east of Buxton.

There has been extensive mineralization of faults associated with volcanism during Visean times; working of the veins concerned has been a significant industry within the White Peak and has left an often prominent legacy in the landscape. Quarrying of limestone for aggregate and for the chemical industry has also caused considerable landscape change, not least around Buxton and resulting in a sizeable area being excluded from the national park on its designation in 1951. There are areas in the west and along the eastern margins of the Park where Coal Measures rocks are found at the surface and some limited mining for coals has taken place historically.

Within the Dark Peak are innumerable landslips. Some remain active such as the famous Mam Tor slip whilst those at Alport Castles have resulted in dramatic landforms. Valleys incised into the Dark Peak succession have proved attractive sites for reservoir construction.

== Pre-Carboniferous ==
Boreholes have revealed the presence of rocks beneath the Peak District which are significantly older than anything seen at the surface. The Woo Dale borehole penetrated volcanic rocks of possible Precambrian age at a depth of 273m whilst boreholes at Eyam and at Caldon Low proved sedimentary rocks of Ordovician and Devonian age respectively.

== Carboniferous ==
A succession of early Carboniferous limestones, grouped together as the Peak Limestone Group, outcrop across the White Peak. These strata are overlain by Craven Group rocks which are in turn overlain by those of the Millstone Grit. Coal Measures rocks of the late Carboniferous are found overlying the Millstone Grit sequence in parts of both the eastern and western margins of the national park.

=== Carboniferous Limestone ===
During the early Carboniferous, northern England was characterised by a series of shallow ‘shelf’ seas and intervening deeper water basins owing their existence to movement on deep-seated faults such as, within the area of the modern Peak District, the Mackworth and Bakewell faults. Different suites of limestone accumulated in the basin and shelf areas with a third depositional environment characterised by reefs at the margins of the two. Together all of these formations comprise the Peak Limestone Group.

On the shelf area, the following sequence developed (youngest/uppermost first);

- Eyam Limestone Formation
- Monsal Dale Limestone Formation
- Bee Low Limestone Formation
- Woo Dale Limestone Formation

The oldest of these, the Woo Dale limestones are seen in a restricted number of small outcrops, notably Wye Dale and adjacent Woo Dale and also in the Peak Forest and Alstonefield areas. At the small outcrop where Woo Dale joins Wye Dale, east of Buxton, the lowermost part of the formation is dolomitised; this was the site of the drilling of a deep borehole which reached the base of the formation which is otherwise unseen and showed them to lie unconformably on earlier Palaeozoic rocks. The overlying succession characterises the larger part of the limestone outcrop which gives rise to the White Peak stretching south from Winnats Pass.

The south-eastern salient of the limestone outcrop represents the basinal (or ‘off-shelf’) sequence (again youngest/uppermost first):

- Hopedale Limestone Formation
- Milldale Limestone Formation

=== Craven Group ===
The Craven Group strata are a mix of sandstones, mudstones and limestones with lesser amounts of other lithologies. They range from the Chadian to the Yeadonian substage in age. They include:

- Bowland Shale Formation
- Hurdlow Sandstones
- Minn Sandstones
- Widmerpool Formation (former Mixon Limestone-Shales)
  - Onecote Sandstones Member
- Ecton Limestone Formation / Hopedale Limestone Formation
- Milldale Limestone Formation
- Rue Hill Dolomite Formation (borehole only?)

Knoll-reefs occur along the northern margin of the limestone outcrop from Barmoor northeast to Winnats Pass and east from there towards Bradwell, continuing south from that village. Further such knolls contribute to the present day topography around Eyam and Stoney Middleton. Apron-reefs occur in association with the Bee Low Limestones along the western margin of the limestone outcrop giving rise to the Chrome Hill, Parkhouse Hill, Hitter Hill and Aldery Cliff amongst others.

The gorge sections of the Hamps and Manifold valleys incise the Ecton Limestone Formation and associated knoll-reefs to a point just downstream of their confluence. The Dove does similarly with the prominent tors and spires in the lower reaches of its gorge provided by knoll-reef limestones.

The Wye and its tributary gorges are cut into the Bee Low Limestones. This sequence was traditionally divided into an upper ‘Miller’s Dale Limestone’ and a lower ‘Chee Tor Rock’ where the Lower Miller’s Dale Lava was identifiable

=== Millstone Grit Group ===
The Millstone Grit Group strata are predominantly sandstones, siltstones and mudstones with lesser amounts of other lithologies. They correspond to the Namurian stage. They include:

- Rossendale Formation
- Rough Rock
- Marsden Formation
- Chatsworth Grit
- Ashover Grit (in east) and Roaches Grit (in west)
- Clouds Sandstones - not part of Marsden Formation? (in west)
- Hebden Formation
- Longnor Sandstone
- Corbar Grit
- Kinderscout Grit
- Shale Grit
- Mam Tor Beds

Note also the Sheen Sandstones, Morridge Formation and Ipstones Edge Sandstones.

=== Coal Measures ===
The Pennine Coal Measures Group comprise alternating sandstones, siltstones and mudstones and the occasional coal seam, all forming a part of the Coal Measures Supergroup. They include:

- Pennine Lower Coal Measures Formation
- Woodhead Hill Rock
- Milnrow Sandstone
- Lawrence Rock or Old Lawrence Rock

Note also (in E) the Greenmoor Rock, Loxley Edge Rock, Middle Band Rock and Crawshaw Sandstone.

== Geological structures affecting Carboniferous rocks ==
The Carboniferous strata of the southwest of the National Park was more intensely affected by folding during the Variscan orogeny than strata elsewhere. A boundary between the two structural styles roughly follows the line of Asbian reef knolls from southeast to northwest, defining a 'mobile area' in the west characterised by broadly north-south oriented anticlines and synclines and a 'stable area' in the east. A major fold with a north-south axis within the 'mobile area' is the Goyt Syncline. Also formerly referred to as the 'Goyt Trough' it reaches from Rowarth southwards to the vicinity of Leek just outside of the park. To its west are the Macclesfield Forest and Todd Brook anticlines and the separate Gun Hill Anticline, whilst to its east are the major Mixon-Morridge Anticline and the smaller scale Countess Cliff and Edgeworth/Longhill anticlines. The Ecton Anticline is flanked by the Fernyford Syncline to its west and the Archford Moor Syncline to its east. The larger folds have amplitudes of several hundred metres with axes in excess of 10km in length.

Rather gentler folding affects strata to the east and the orientation is more random. The east-west oriented Longstone Edge Anticline and Stanton Syncline are identified as are the broad northwest-southeast oriented Taddington Anticline with the Priestcliffe Syncline and Monyash Syncline to its northeast and southwest respectively.

A series of east-west oriented folds affect strata in the north of the park and include from north to south, the Fagney Syncline, Alport Anticline, Kinderscout Syncline, Edale and Hope Valley anticlines and the Abney Syncline. The northern part of the White Peak is affected by the NNW-SSE aligned Peak Forest Anticline.

== Triassic ==
No rocks of Permian age are recorded in the National Park but a very small area in the south of the Park around Mapleton on the Dove is underlain by the Triassic sandstones and conglomerates of the Chester Formation, formerly the Hawksmoor Formation within the Sherwood Sandstone Group.

== Neogene ==
No rocks of Jurassic, Cretaceous or Palaeogene age have been recorded in the district but a number of scattered 'pocket deposits' of Neogene age are recognised in the area between Monyash and Parwich (and around Brassington just to the southeast of the park boundary). These sand, silt and clay deposits have been largely assigned to the Brassington Formation. The deposits which occur within solution cavities in the limestone, and particularly dolomite outcrop, have been divided into three 'members'; an uppermost Kenslow Member consisting of grey clays, an underlying Bees Nest Member consisting of coloured clays and a lowermost Kirkham Member formed from sands and gravels.

== Quaternary ==
Glacial till of mid Pleistocene age is recorded across numerous slopes but the district was not glaciated during the last ice age. Numerous areas of head, a mass movement deposit, are mapped across the district, composed of clay, silt, sand and gravel. There are extensive areas of peat across moorlands in the Dark Peak such as Kinder Scout and Bleaklow. The floors of major valleys are characterised by alluvium and river terrace deposits, notably those of the Derwent, Wye, Dove and Manifold.

== Economic geology ==
The limestones have been widely quarried around the Peak District. Most quarries work the Bee Low Limestones as to the east and south of Buxton; the boundary of the national park has excluded these areas since its designation in 1951. Others such as those at Stoney Middleton and at Bradwell are within its boundaries. Major quarries work the Milldale Limestone at Caldon Low. In contrast, the former quarry at Calton Hill worked an intrusive dolerite mass.

The Millstone Grit derives its name from the use of this rock to provide millstones. It has also found widespread use as a building material and, where it can be suitably split, as a roofing and paving material.

Lead has been obtained from the lead ore galena present in the rakes, veins, scrins, pipes and flats which have been widely exploited across much of the White Peak. Also present are barytes and fluorspar which have been used in the paper and paint industries and the chemical industry respectively. Calcite has been worked from the same veins for certain specialist uses e.g. (as Iceland Spar), in Victorian optical equipment. The copper ore, chalcopyrite was formerly mined at Ecton in Staffordshire whilst zinc-bearing sphalerite was worked elsewhere

The Neogene pocket deposits described above have been exploited for the production of fire bricks.

== See also ==
- Geology of Cheshire
- Geology of Yorkshire
