= Baron St Helens =

Extant barony in the Peerage of the United Kingdom

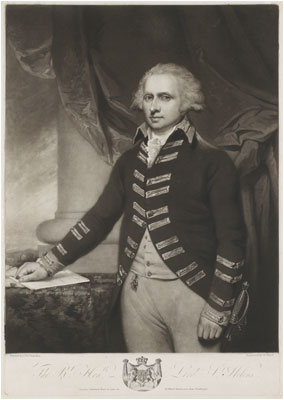
Alleyne FitzHerbert, 1st Baron St Helens

Baron St Helens is a title that has been created three times, once in the Peerage of Ireland and twice in the Peerage of the United Kingdom.

== History ==
The first two creations were both in favour of the same person but are now extinct. The first creation came in the Peerage of Ireland on 26 January 1791 when the Chief Secretary for Ireland Alleyne FitzHerbert was created Baron St Helens. On 31 July 1801, he was further honoured when he was created Baron St Helens, of St Helens on the Isle of Wight in the County of Southampton, in the Peerage of the United Kingdom, allowing him to sit in the House of Lords. On his death in 1839, both baronies became extinct. Lord St Helens was the son of William FitzHerbert, Member of Parliament for Derby, and a younger brother of Sir William FitzHerbert, 1st Baronet.

The third creation came on 31 December 1964 when the Conservative politician Michael Hughes-Young was created Baron St Helens, of St Helens in the County Palatine of Lancaster. He had earlier represented Wandsworth Central in the House of Commons. It was one of the last hereditary baronies ever created in the Peerage of the United Kingdom. As of 2025, the title is held by his grandson, the third Baron, who succeeded his father following his death in that year. Henry George Young, father of the first Baron, was a Brigadier-General in the British Army.

== Baron St Helens, first and second creations (1791, 1801) ==
- Alleyne FitzHerbert, 1st Baron St Helens (1753–1839)

== Baron St Helens, third creation (1964) ==
- Michael Henry Colin Hughes-Young, 1st Baron St Helens (1912–1980)
- Richard Francis Hughes-Young, 2nd Baron St Helens (1945–2025)
- Henry Thomas Hughes-Young, 3rd Baron St Helens (born 1986)

There is no heir.

Coat of arms of Baron St Helens
Crest A dexter cubit arm Proper charged with a fountain a hand grasping an arrow fesswise Proper. Escutcheon Or three piles Sable each charged with a fountain. Supporters Dexter a wolf Gules sinister a griffin Sable each charged on the shoulder with a portcullis Or. Motto Press Through
