= Well dressing =

English tradition of decorating wells

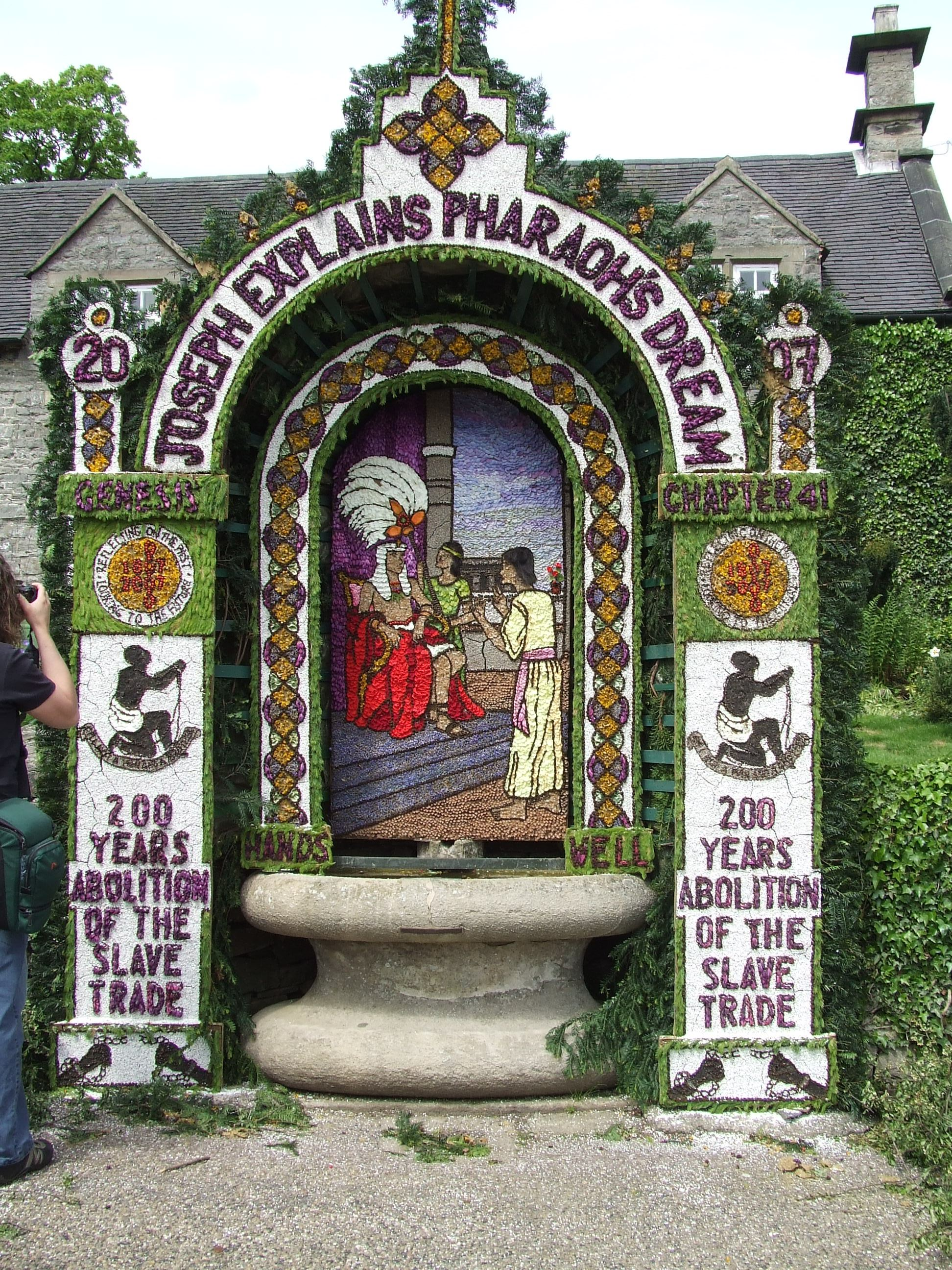
Well dressing in Tissington in the Derbyshire Dales, 2007

Well dressing, also known as well flowering, is a tradition practised in some parts of rural England in which wells, springs and other water sources (especially holy wells or sacred springs) are decorated with designs created from materials such as flower petals. The custom is most closely associated with the Peak District of Derbyshire and Staffordshire. James Murray Mackinlay, writing in 1893, noted that the tradition was not observed in Scotland; W. S. Cordner, in 1946, similarly noted its absence in Ireland. Both Scotland and Ireland do have a long history of the veneration of wells, however, dating from at least the 6th century.

The custom of well dressing in its present form probably began in the late 18th century, and evolved from "the more widespread, but less picturesque" decoration of wells with ribbons and simple floral garlands.

== History ==
Well dressing was celebrated in at least 12 villages in Derbyshire by the late 19th century, and was introduced in Buxton in 1840, "to commemorate the beneficence of the Duke of Devonshire who, at his own expense, made arrangements for supplying the Upper Town, which had been much inconvenienced by the distance to St Anne's well on the Wye, with a fountain of excellent water within easy reach of all". Similarly, well dressing was revived at this time in Youlgreave, to celebrate the supplying of water to the village "from a hill at some distance, by means of pipes laid under the stream of an intervening valley.". With the arrival of piped water the tradition was adapted to include public taps, although the resulting creations were still described as well dressings.

The custom waxed and waned over the years, but has seen revivals in Derbyshire, Staffordshire, South Yorkshire, Cheshire, Shropshire, Worcestershire and Kent.

In Tissington, Derbyshire, well dressing may have begun as a pagan custom of offering thanks to gods for a reliable water supply; other suggested explanations include villagers celebrating the purity of their water supply after surviving the Black Death in 1348, or alternatively celebrating their water's constancy during a prolonged drought in 1615. The practice of well dressing using clay boards at Tissington is not recorded before 1818, however, and the earliest record for the wells being adorned by simple garlands occurs in 1758.

Tissington well dressing

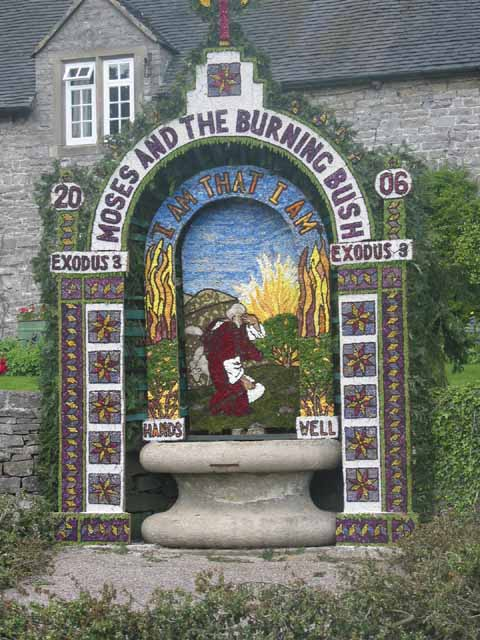
Hands Well, 2006

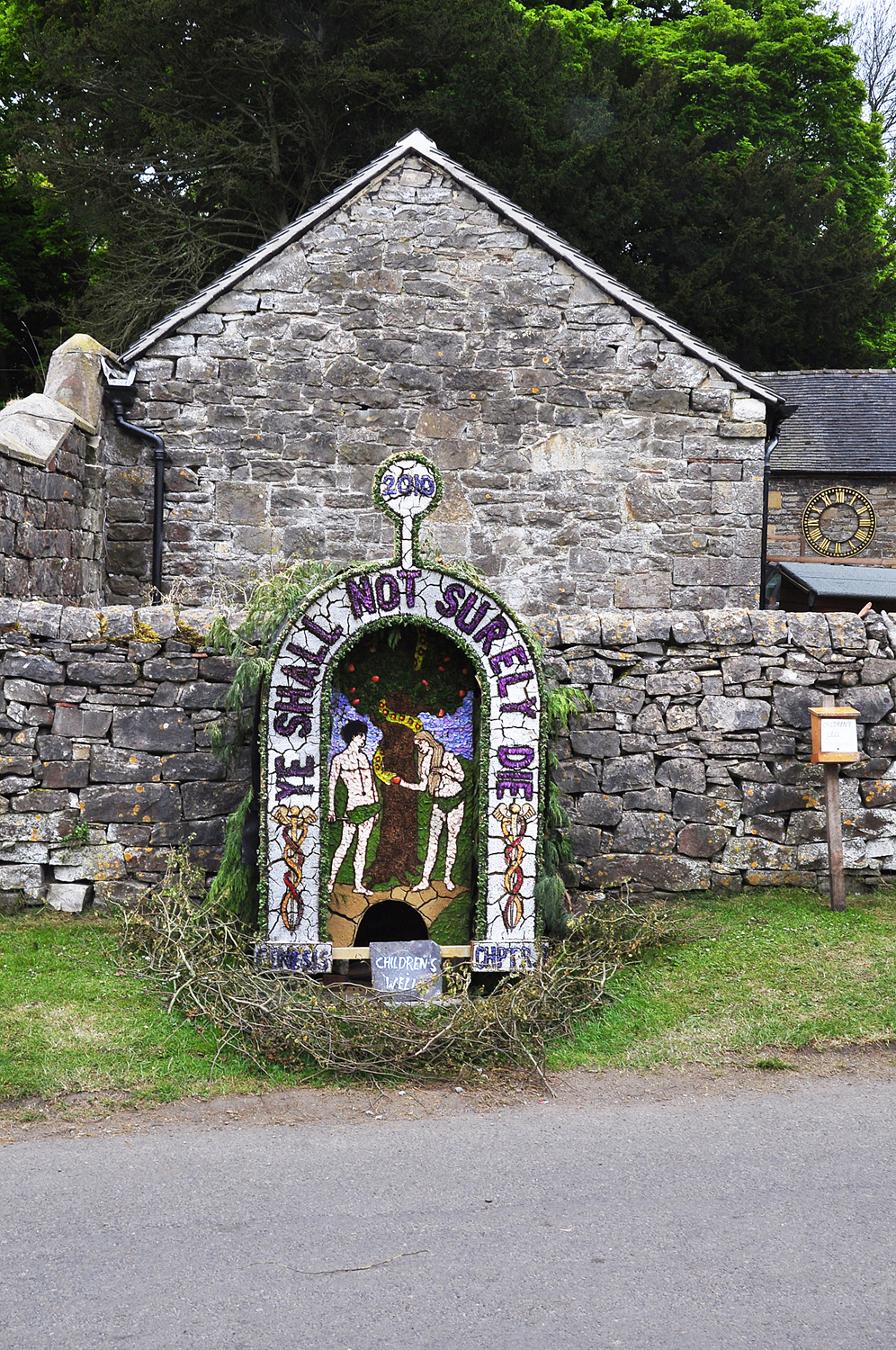
Children's Well, 2010

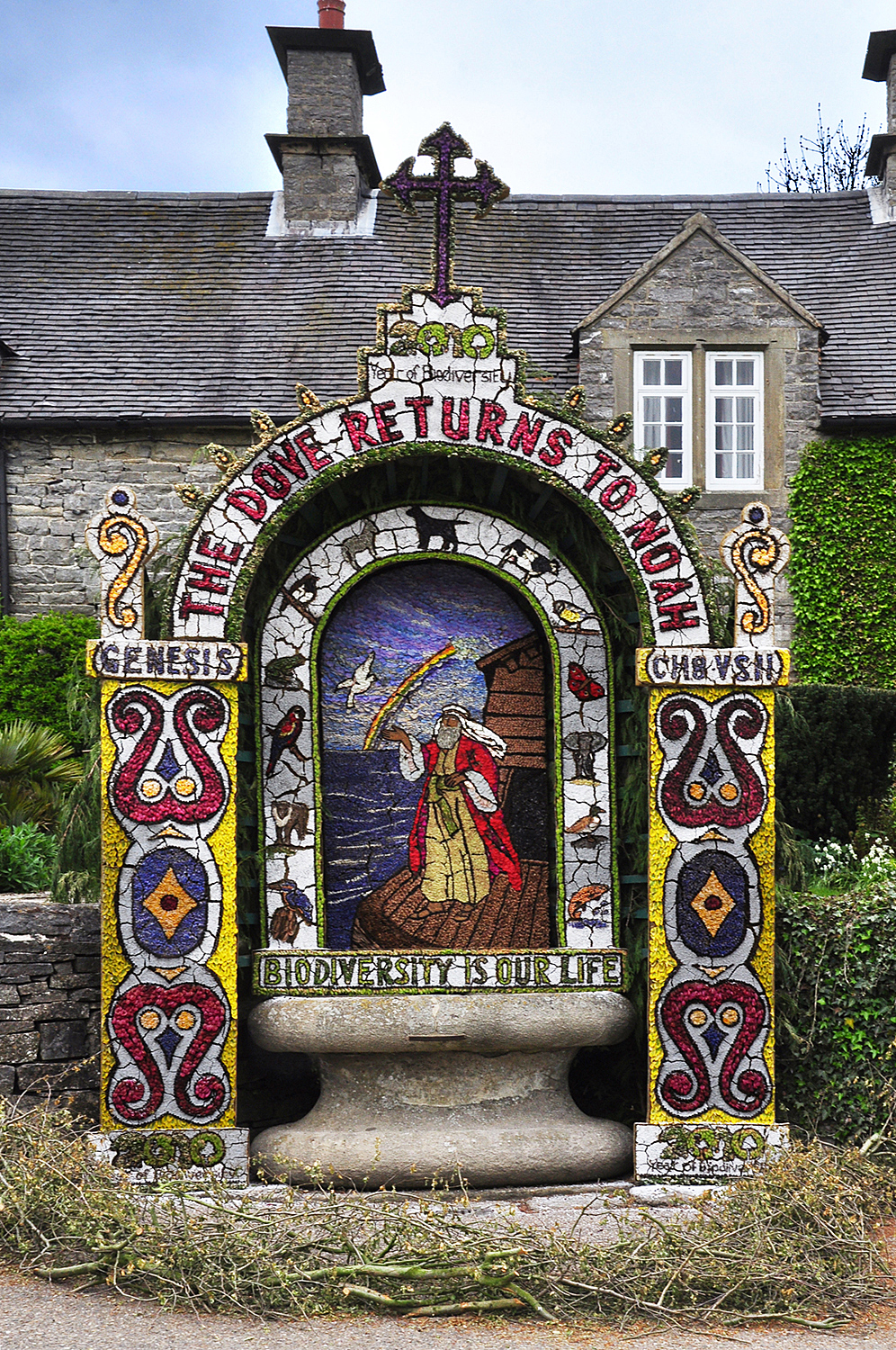
Fitzherbert School Well, 2010

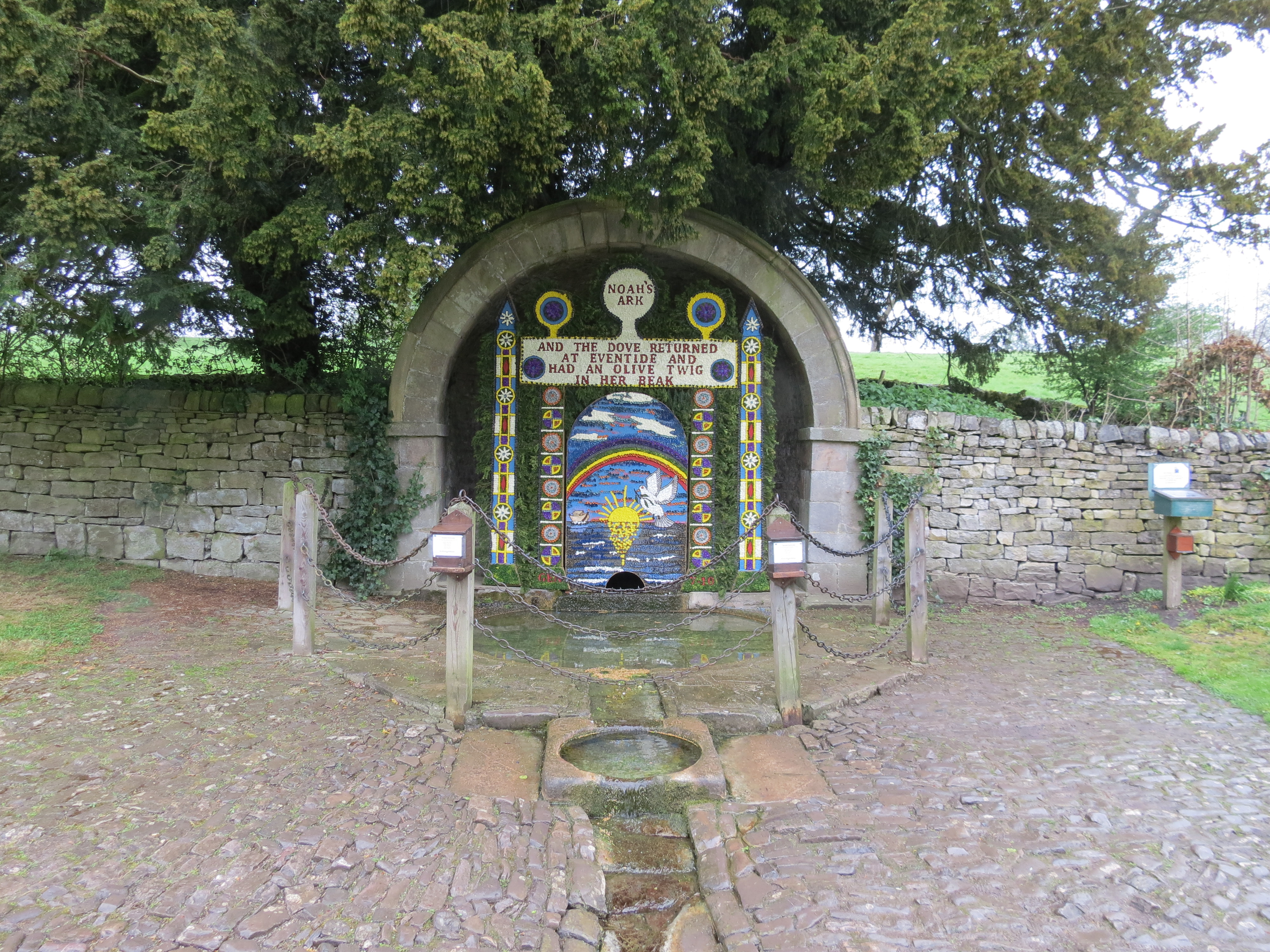
Hall Well, 2013

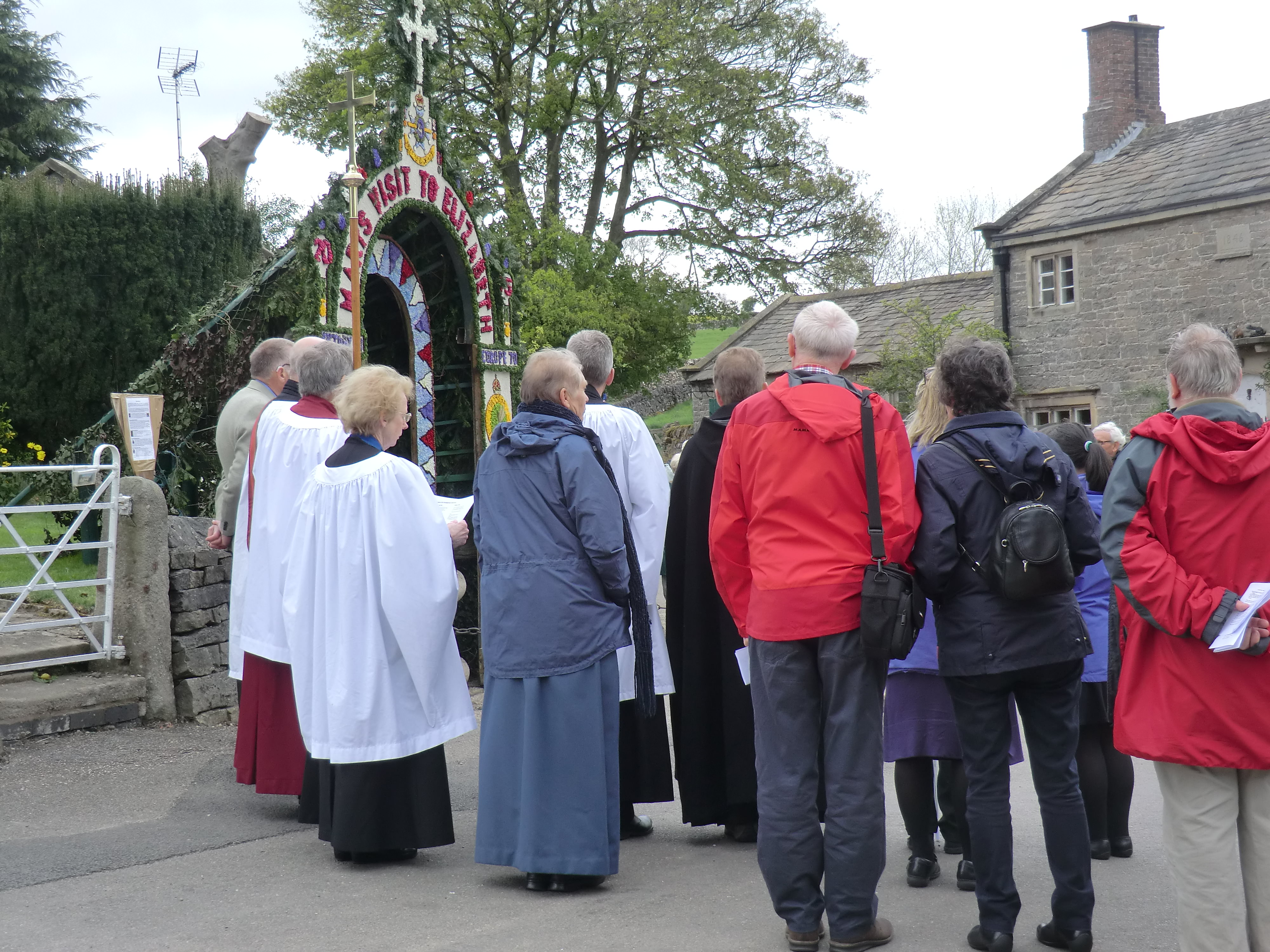
Blessing of Hands Well, 2015

== Process ==
Wooden frames are constructed and covered with clay, mixed with water and salt. A design is sketched on paper, often of a religious theme, and this is traced onto the clay. The picture is then filled in with natural materials, predominantly flower petals and mosses, but also beans, seeds and small cones. Each group uses its own technique, with some areas mandating that only natural materials be used while others feel free to use modern materials to simplify production. The completed image is then put on public display for about a week to ten days. This period is often marked by religious services, parades, flower festivals, fetes and other celebrations within the community.

Well dressings in counties around England

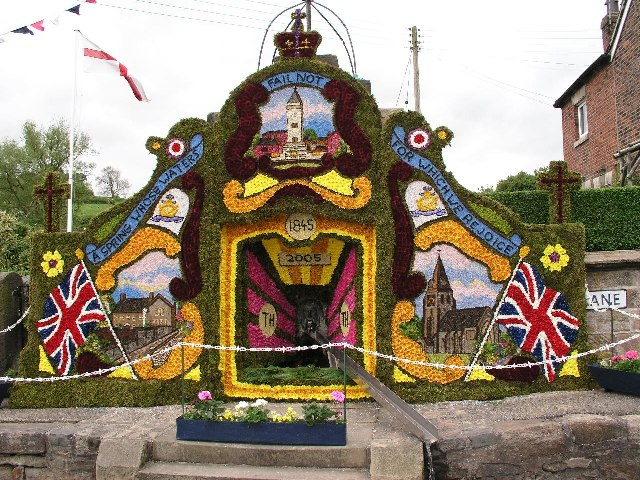
Endon, Staffordshire, 2005

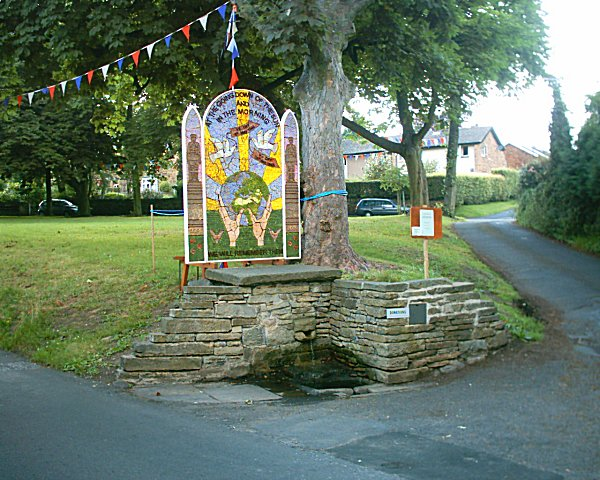
Dore, South Yorkshire, 2005

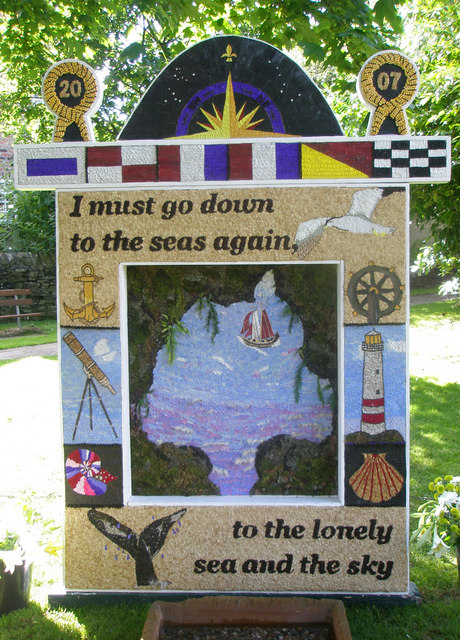
Sutton, Cheshire, 2007

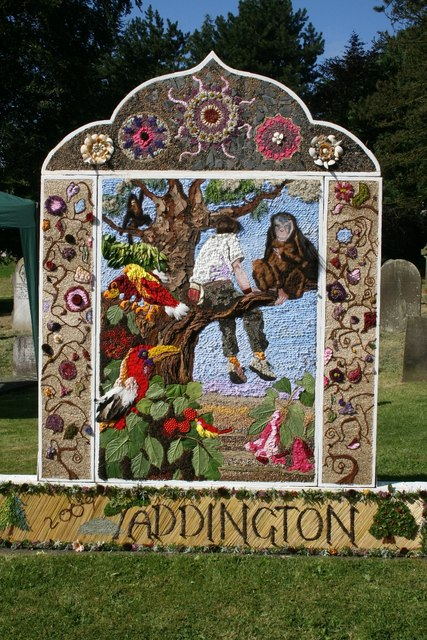
Taddington, Derbyshire, 2009

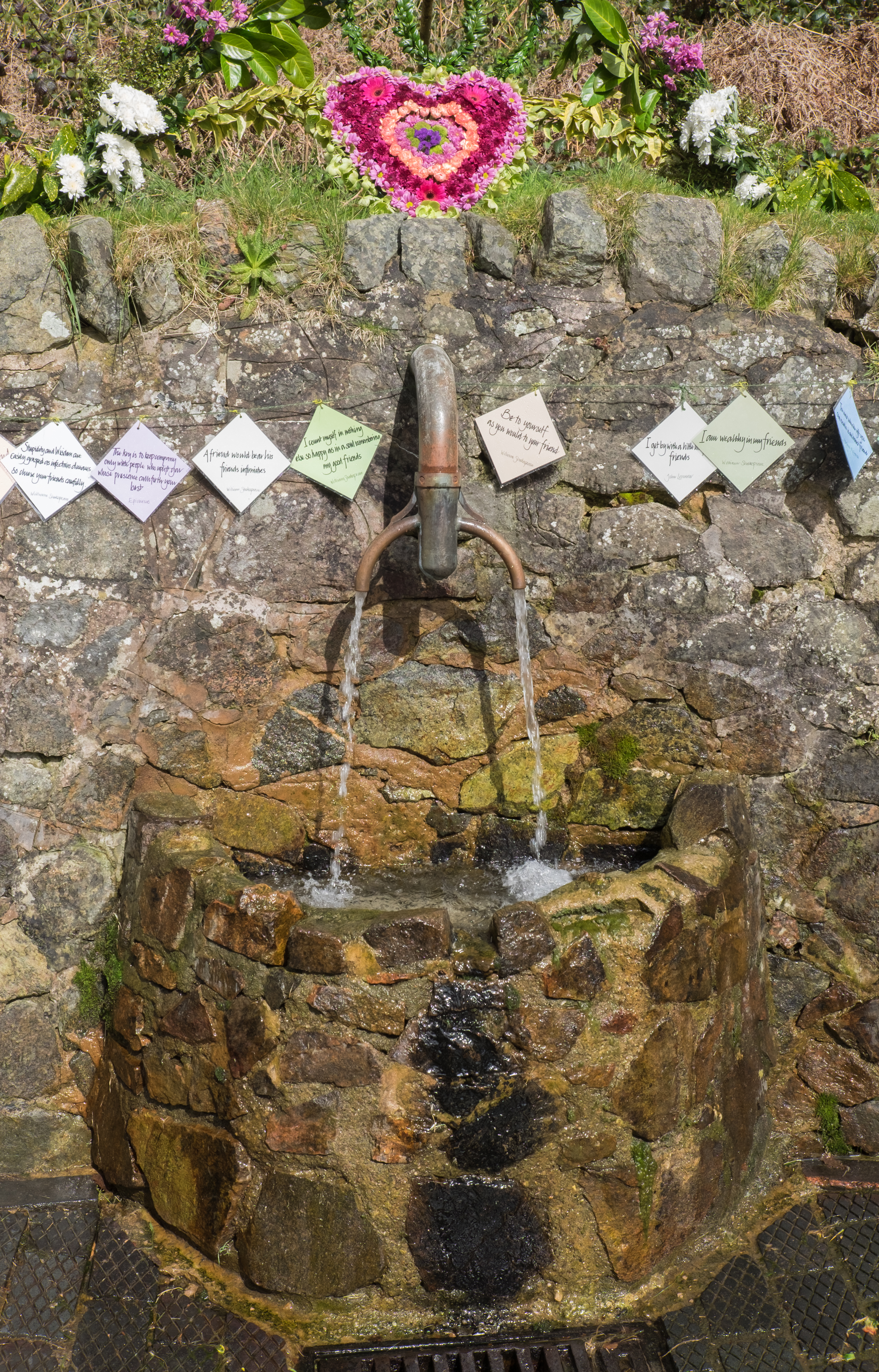
Hayslad Spout, West Malvern, Worcestershire, 2016

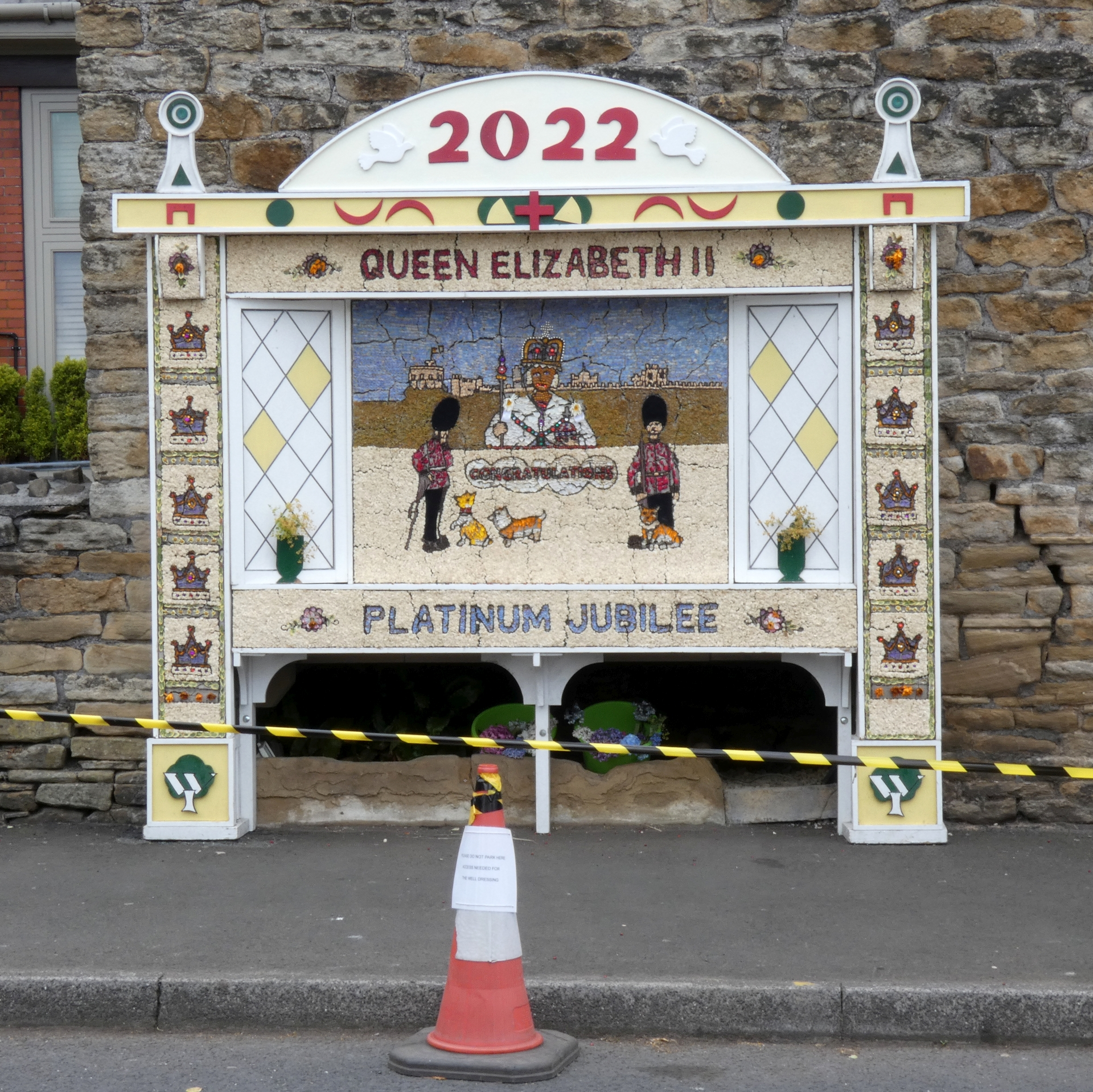
Booths Well, Greater Manchester, 2022

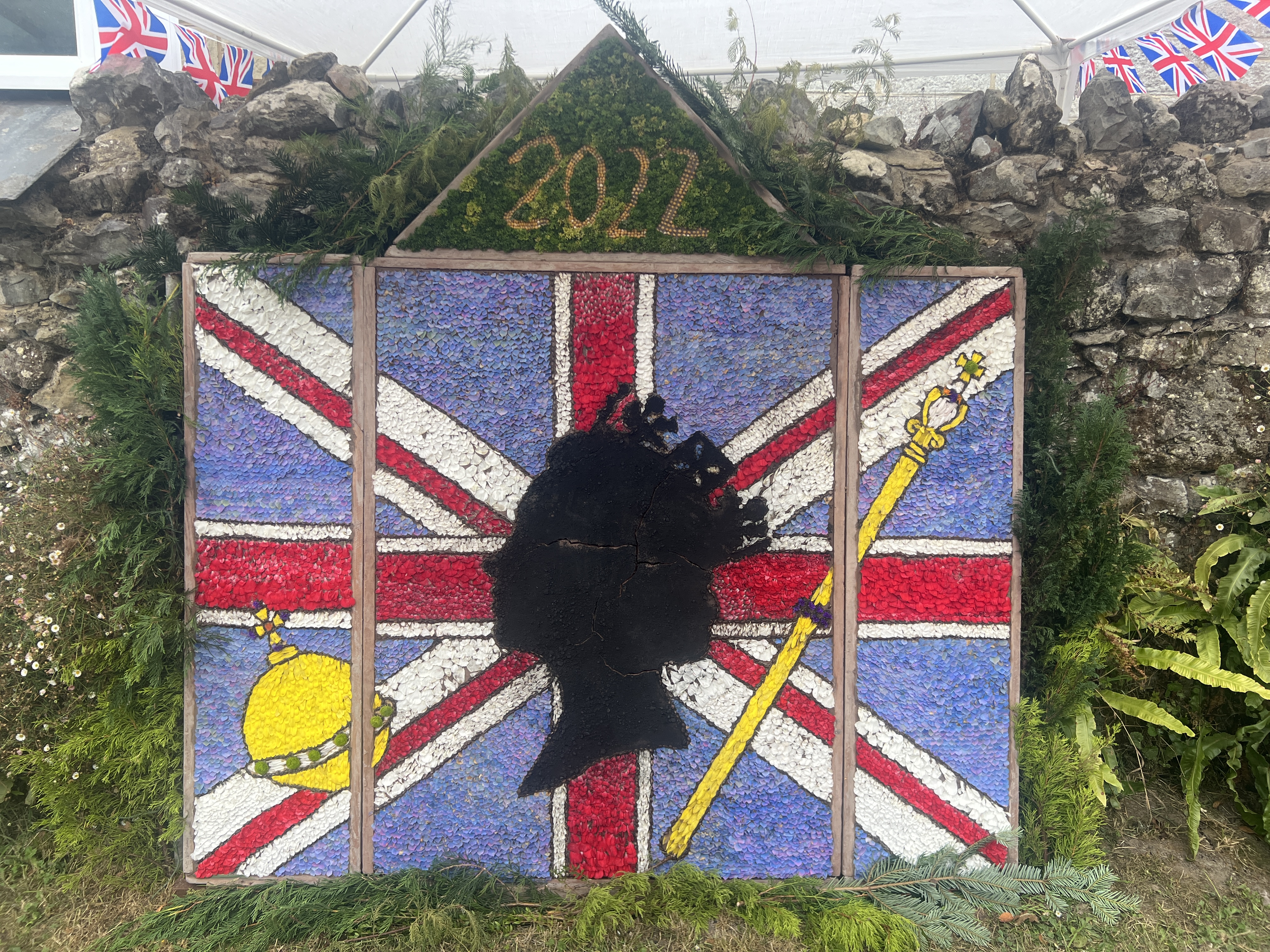
Whitwell, Isle of Wight, 2022

Amongst the natural materials, lichens play a role in well dressing due to their durability. Unlike flower petals that fade quickly, lichens maintain their colour and structure throughout the week-long display period. Parmelia saxatilis, collected from gritstone walls, is commonly used in two ways: either with its undersurface exposed to create a velvety black effect, or with its upper surface visible to produce a dull grey tone for backgrounds and lettering. Xanthoria parietina, gathered from limestone walls, is sorted to provide a range of colours from bright orange through yellow to green. Well dressers often have their own nomenclature for these materials; in some villages Xanthoria is known as "golden lichen" or "bronze moss", while Parmelia saxatilis is referred to as "grey lichen" or "silvery lichen". In villages such as Wormhill and Eyam, lichens have been recorded as a component in depicting buildings and architectural details in the decorative scenes.

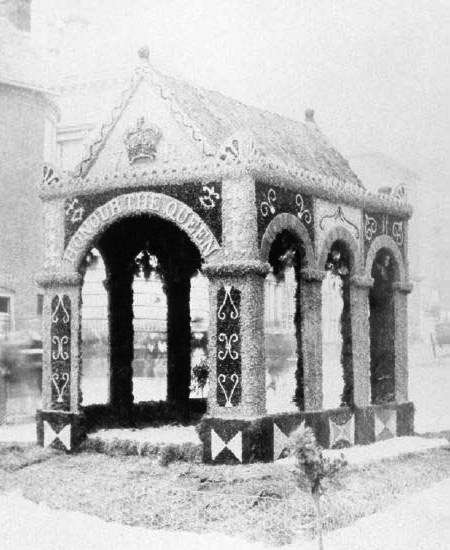
Well or tap dressing in Wirksworth in the 1860s.

Wirksworth and Barlow, both in Derbyshire, are two of the very few village well dressings where the strict use of only natural materials is still observed. In Wirksworth, the dressings use "only natural materials, e.g. flower petals, moss, lichen, fruit skins, [and] seeds", with no "manufactured" decorations. In Barlow, three wells (the main well around the village pump, the small or children's well, and the commonside well) are dressed, with scenes "made up of flowers, seeds, grasses (anything that grows really!)".

== In literature ==
John Brunner's story "In the Season of the Dressing of the Wells" describes the revival of the custom in an English village of the West Country after World War I, and its connection to the Goddess.

Jon McGregor's novel Reservoir 13 is set in a village where well dressing is an annual event.

== See also ==
- Clootie well
- Osterbrunnen
