= Tissington Hall =

Coordinates: 53.0681°N 1.7406°W

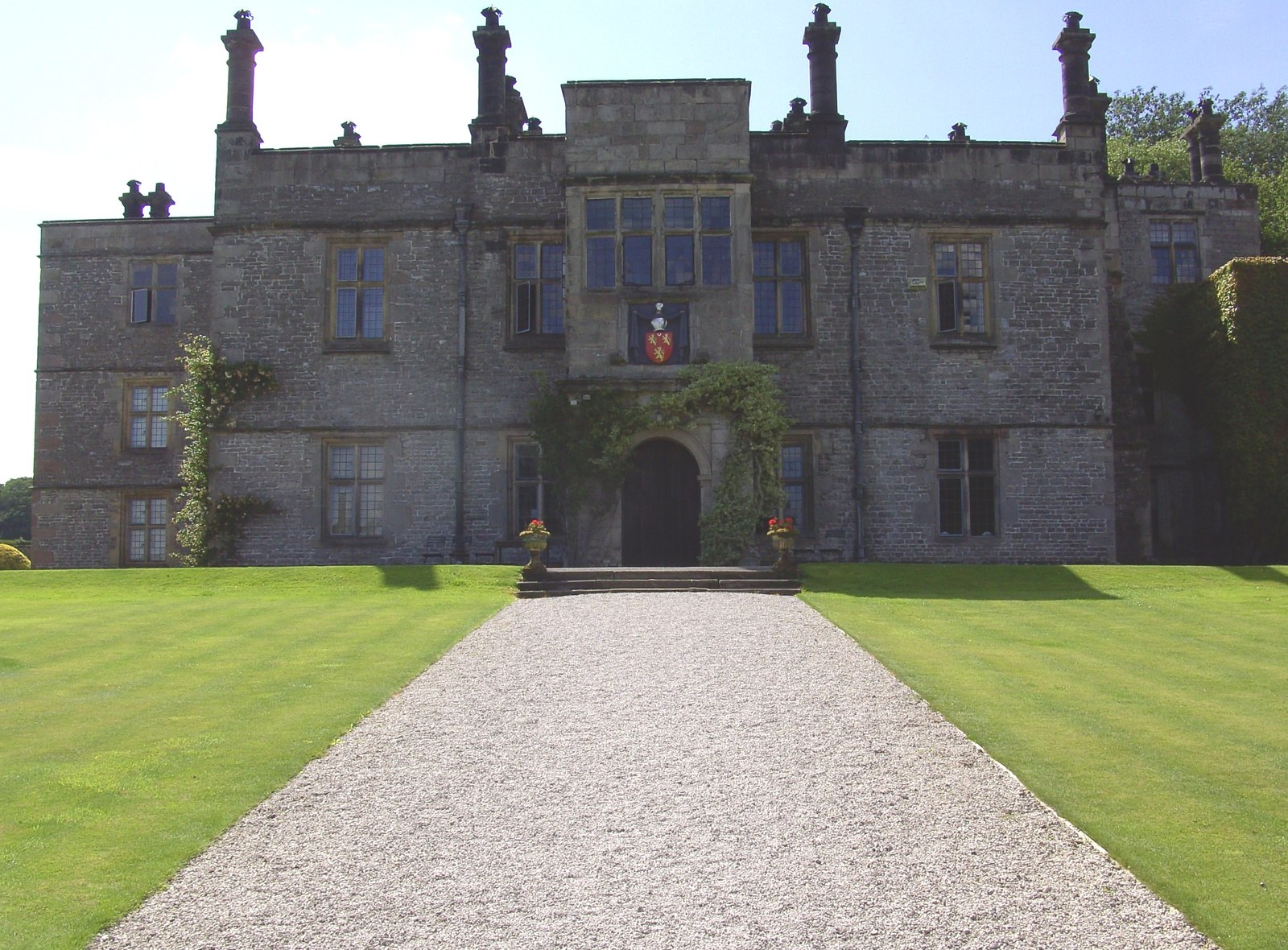

- Location within Derbyshire
- Location: Tissington, England
- OS grid reference: SK1746352347

History
- Built: 1609

Site notes
- Architectural style: Jacobean architecture
- Owner: Sir Richard FitzHerbert, 9th Baronet

Listed Building – Grade II*
- Official name: Tissington Hall
- Designated: 5 February 1952
- Reference no.: 1335283

Tissington Hall is an early 17th-century Jacobean mansion house in Tissington, near Ashbourne, Derbyshire. It is a Grade II* listed building.

The FitzHerberts, descended from the Norman family of Norbury Hall, acquired Tissington by the marriage of Nicholas FitzHerbert (the second son of John FitzHerbert of Somersal Herbert) to Ciceley Frauncis, heiress of Tissington, in 1465.

The old moated manor at Tissington was replaced with the new mansion in 1609 by Francis FitzHerbert and remains the home of the FitzHerbert family. The current occupant is Sir Richard FitzHerbert, 9th Baronet. Both Francis FitzHerbert and his son (Sir) John served as High Sheriff of Derbyshire, a post that circulated among the county families. Tissington Hall is often noted for being unusual for its more progressive design aspects. It is one of a small group of compact Derbyshire gentry houses in which a central hall runs through the house from front to back. the unusual, progressive character may be due to the influence of lodges (Nicholas Cooper counted some fifty emparked estates in Saxton's map of the shire, of 1570) and the grand example of a through-hall at Hardwick. Behind a two-storey enclosed entrance porch, the hall is entered at the centre of one end. On the left are two parlours separated by a stairhall, on the right a kitchen and buttery. Corner towers on the garden front, now linked by the additional upper floor above the gallery range, provide further rooms.

A rococo gothic fireplace in the house follows a published design by Batty Langley. The Hall is open to the public at specified times of the year and is available for commercial and private functions.

The Hall is Grade II* listed, the second-highest designation. The garden terraces and walls, stable block, staff quarters and outbuildings, and entrance gates are separately listed, all at Grade II.

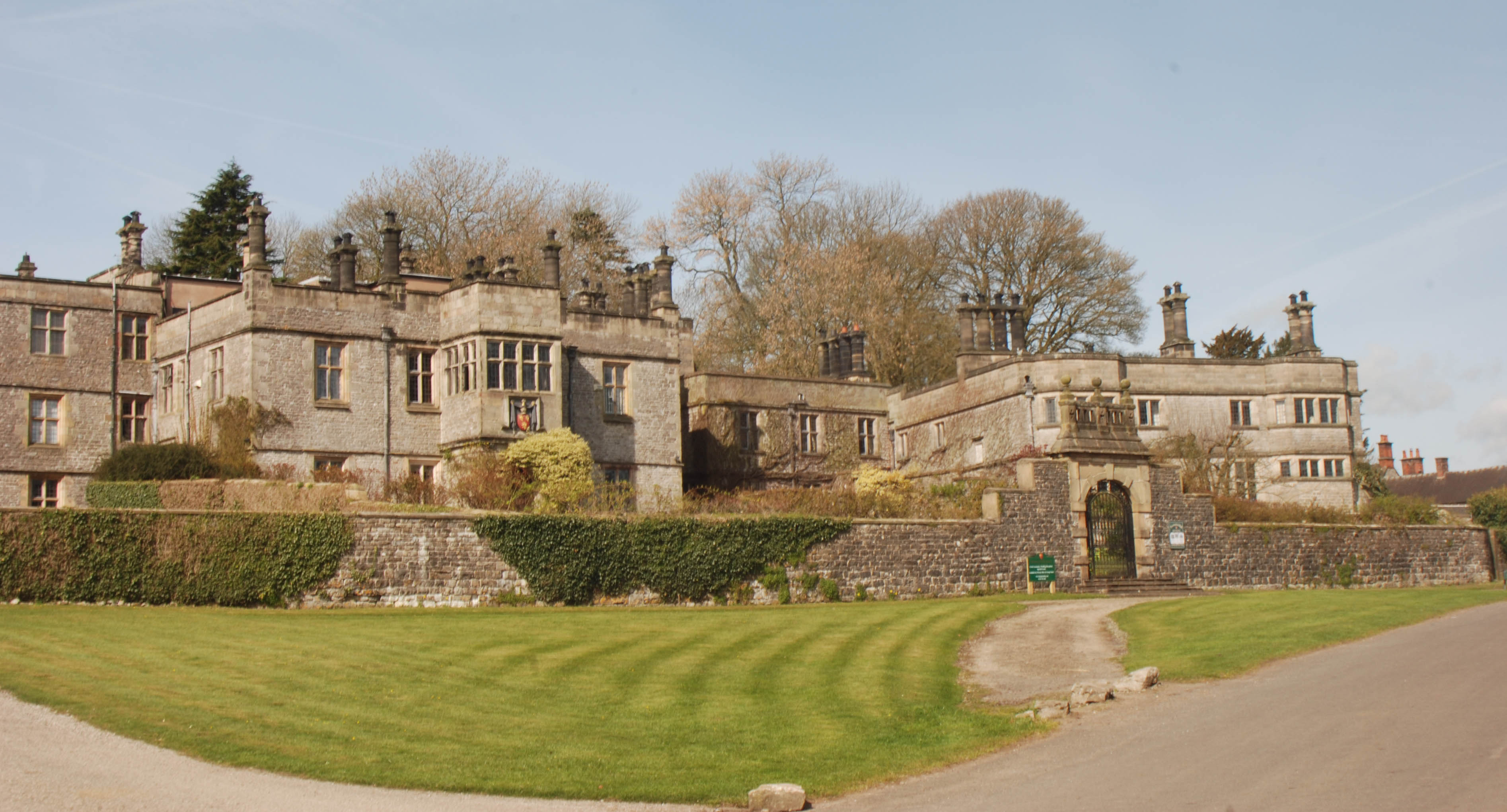
Tissington Hall

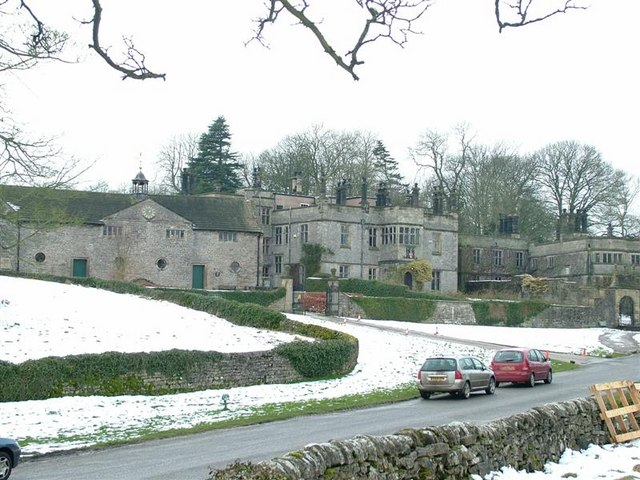
Tissington Hall: the stable block is on the left

== See also ==
- Grade II* listed buildings in Derbyshire Dales
- Listed buildings in Tissington and Lea Hall
- Tissington Trail

== Notes ==
- Jackson-Stops, Jervase, "Tissington Hall, Derbyshire", Country Life 160 (1976), pp. 158–61; 2114–17; 286–89.
