= Sir Richard FitzHerbert, 9th Baronet =

British politician (born 1963)

Sir Richard FitzHerbert Bt
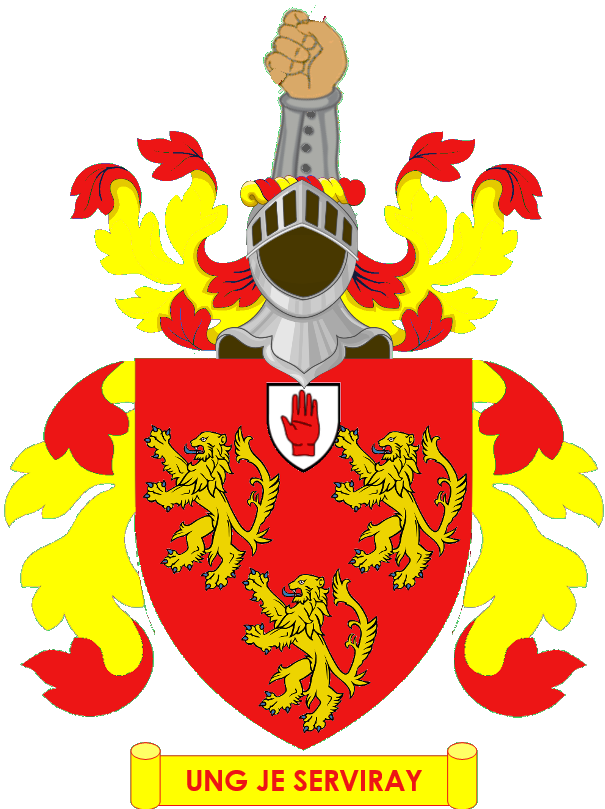
- Born: 2 November 1963 (age 62)
- Education: Eton College
- Occupations: Businessman; Conservative councillor
- Relatives: Sir John FitzHerbert (uncle)

Sir Richard Ranulph FitzHerbert, 9th Baronet (born 2 November 1963), is a British landowner and holds the FitzHerbert baronetcy, which he inherited in 1989 along with the family home, Tissington Hall, on the death of his uncle, Sir John FitzHerbert, 8th Baronet, eldest son of his grandfather Henry FitzHerbert, Archdeacon of Derby. At the time of his inheritance, he was working as a wine merchant.

He is the son of Major the Rev. David Henry FitzHerbert MC by his marriage to Charmian Hyacinthe Allsopp. Educated at Eton, he is an elected Conservative district councillor for the Parwich and Dovedale ward on Derbyshire Dales District Council. and is Chief Executive of Tissington Hall and estate.

He was appointed High Sheriff of Derbyshire for 2025-26.

FitzHerbert married Caroline Louise Shuter in 1993. They had two children, but later divorced. He married secondly Fiona, now Lady FitzHerbert, at Tissington Hall in October 2011, becoming stepfather to her two children.

Sir Richard appeared on the Weakest Link (Series 10, Episode 66), broadcast on 6 November 2008. He was voted off in Round 2, receiving 6 votes. Just 6 days earlier, He appeared as a contestant on ITV gameshow Golden Balls (series 4), broadcast on 31 October 2008.

Coat of arms of Sir Richard FitzHerbert, 9th Baronet

Crest
A dexter hand erect in an open gauntlet all Proper.
Escutcheon
Gules three lions rampant Or.
Motto
Ung Je Serviray (One Will I Serve)

Baronetage of Great Britain
Preceded by John FitzHerbert	Baronet (of Tissington); 1989–present	Incumbent
