= St Oswald's Church, Ashbourne =

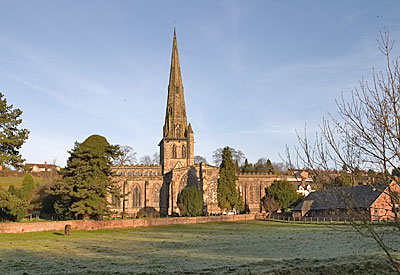
- St Oswald's Church, Ashbourne
- 53.014996°N 1.73869°W
- OS grid reference: SK 17628 46439
- Country: England
- Denomination: Church of England
- Churchmanship: Broad Church/Central
- Website: Ashbourne Church

History
- Dedication: Oswald of Northumbria
- Dedicated: 24 April 1241

Architecture
- Heritage designation: Grade I listed building
- Designated: 1240
- Architectural type: Perpendicular Gothic

Administration
- Province: Canterbury
- Diocese: Diocese of Derby
- Parish: Ashbourne

St Oswald's Church is a Church of England parish church located in Ashbourne, in the county of Derbyshire, England.

== Background ==
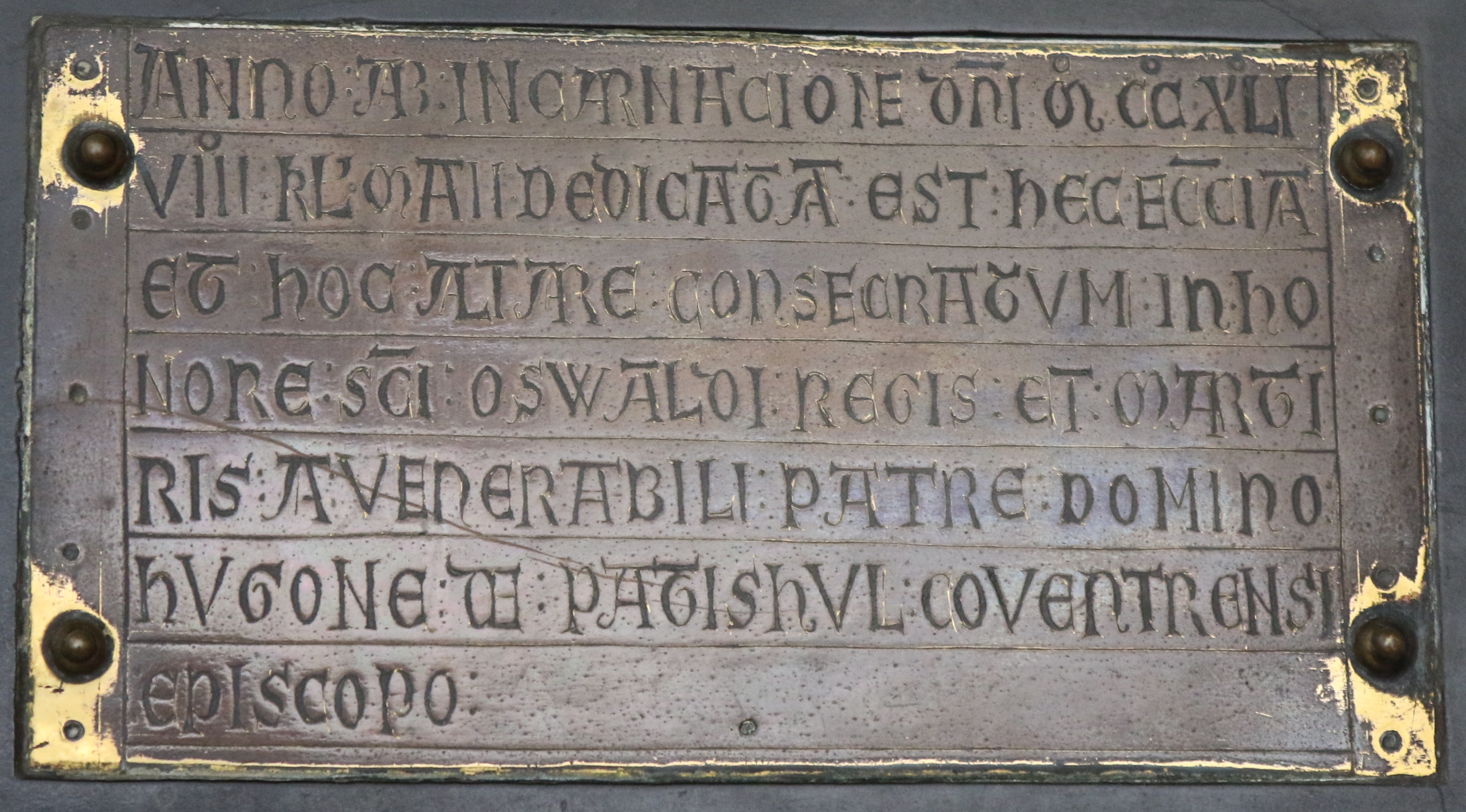
Brass plate commemorating the dedication of St Oswald's Church, Ashbourne on 24 April 1241 by Hugh de Pateshull, Bishop of Coventry and Lichfield

The church dates from c. 1220 and is named after Oswald of Northumbria. A brass plaque in the chapel on the south side of the church commemorates its dedication on 24 April 1241 by Hugh de Pateshull, Bishop of Coventry and Lichfield. The church is a Grade I listed building.

Architecturally, it dominates the small town with its 212-foot (65 m) spire which was referred to by George Eliot as the "finest single spire in England". It is said to have been started in 1240 Construction probably lasted until the early 14th century. It replaced an earlier Saxon church, and possibly a second Norman one. (A Norman crypt was discovered during excavations in 1913.)

From 1837 to 1840, it was restored by Lewis Nockalls Cottingham, and then in the 1870s by George Gilbert Scott, who added the battlements to the chancel.

Until Ashbourne Hall was partially demolished, it and St Oswald's were the town's major monuments, standing at either end of the main street. The entrance to the hall's grounds continued the main street through high gates. What remains of the hall houses a retail unit and some unrelated offices. As they were before the 18th century when the Boothby's rebuilt and refurbished their home, St Oswald's and its tower are once again the major landmark, and the church is the town's main attraction.

== Stained glass ==
There is much stained glass in the church and these include a Christopher Whall window dated 1905. It was given to the church by Mr and Mrs Peveril Turnbull of Sandybrook Hall and it commemorates their daughters who died in a local fire. The window consists of three lights and contains representations of the Martyr Saints, St Cecilia, St Monica and St Dorothea. St Cecilia is seen falling asleep to the sounds of celestial music; an exquisite symbol of death. Girls play the organ dressed in medieval clothes with flowers and crowns in their hair and the celestial city is visible in one panel, viewed through a thicket of thorns. Whall's signature on this stained glass was his own thumbprint.

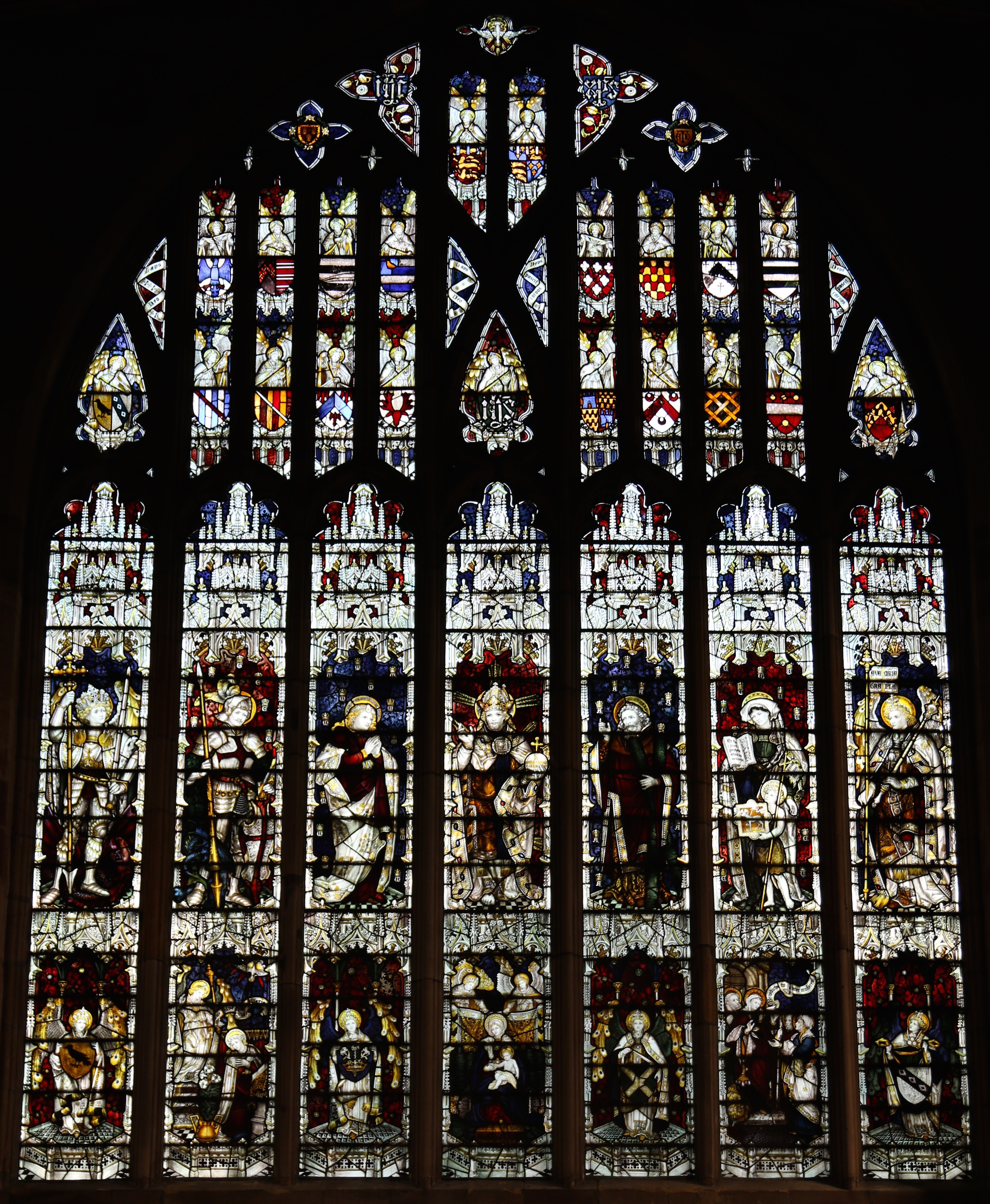
East window by Charles Eamer Kempe

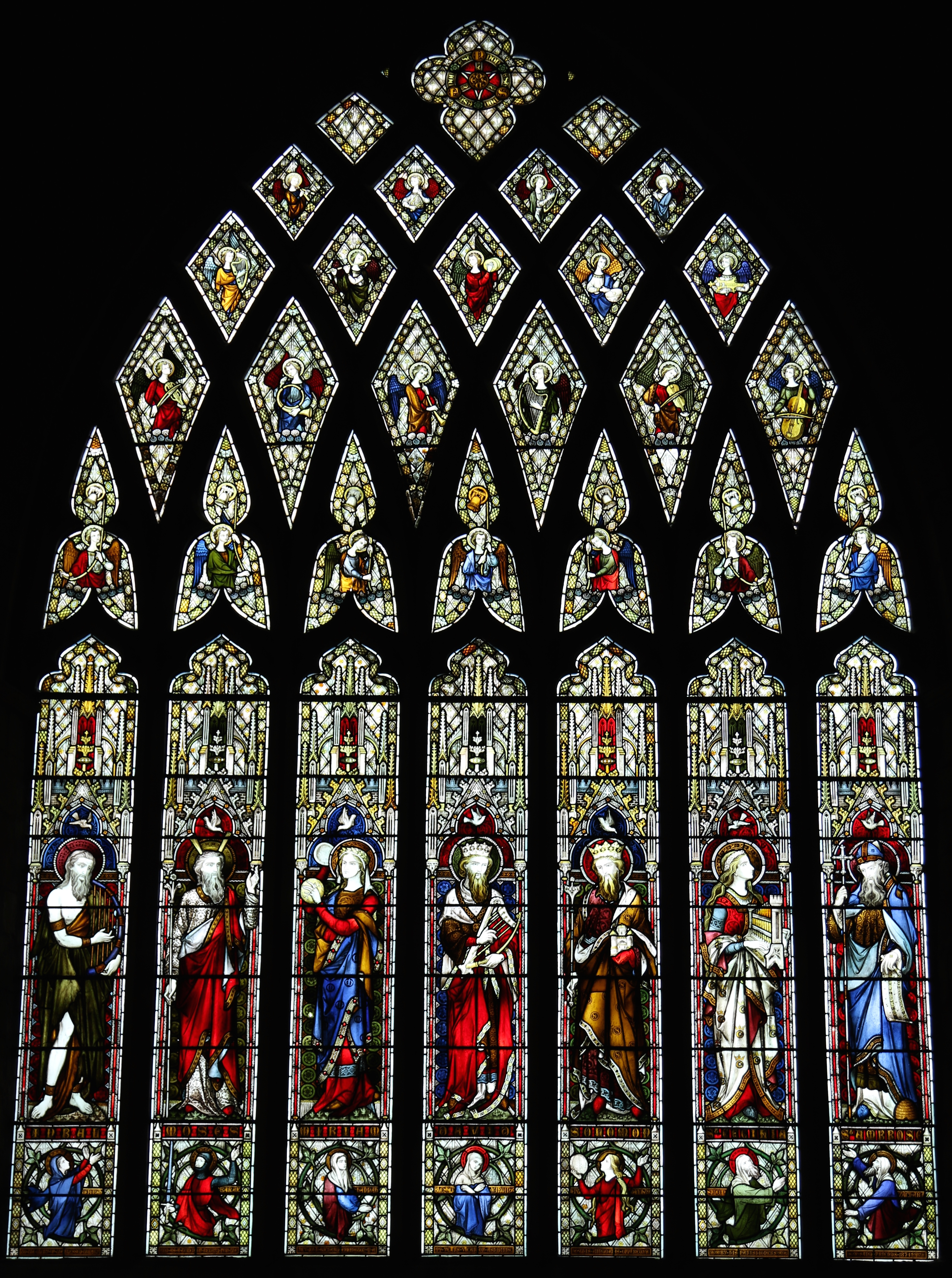
South transept window by Hardman and Co

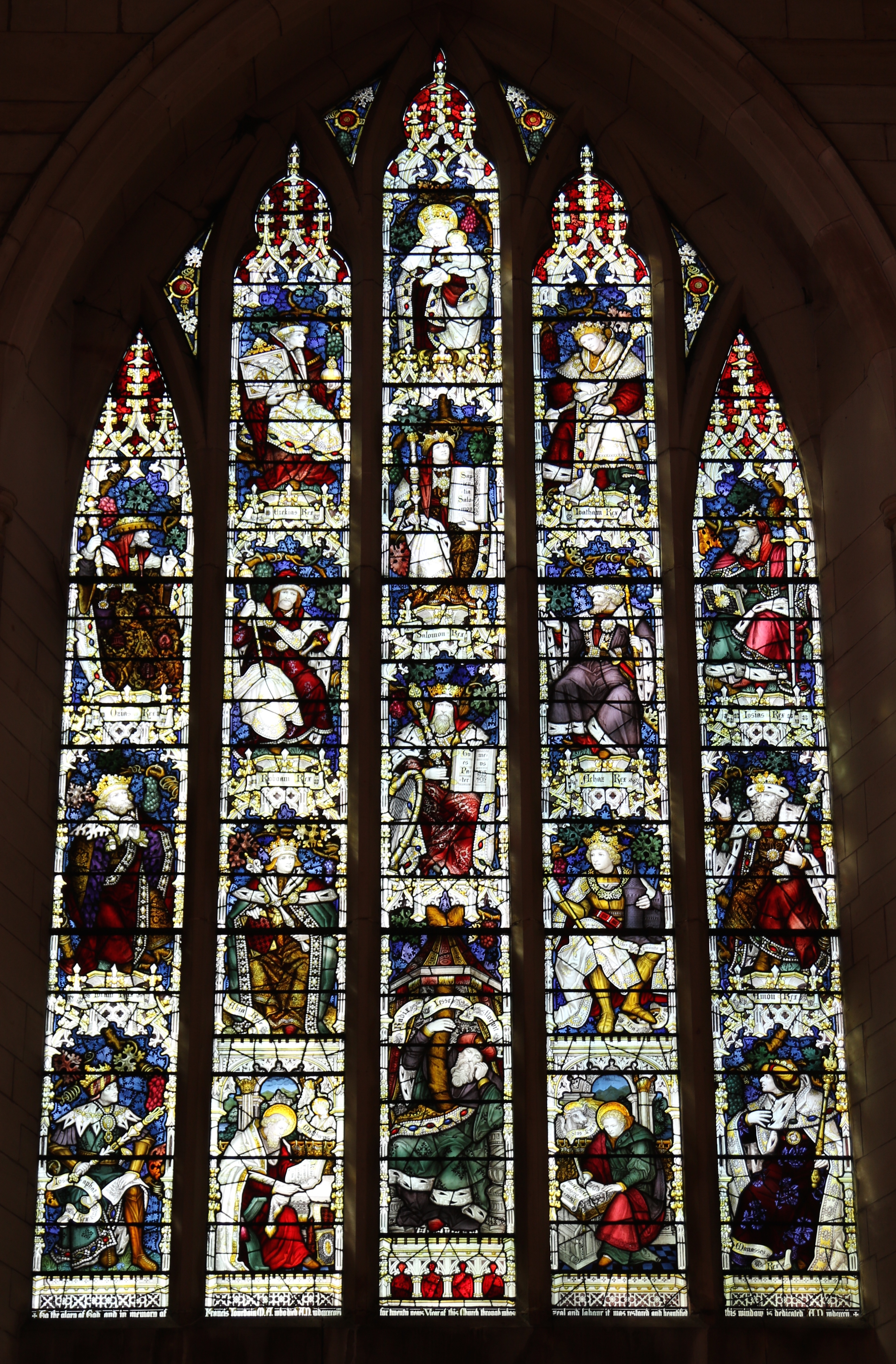
West window by Charles Eamer Kempe

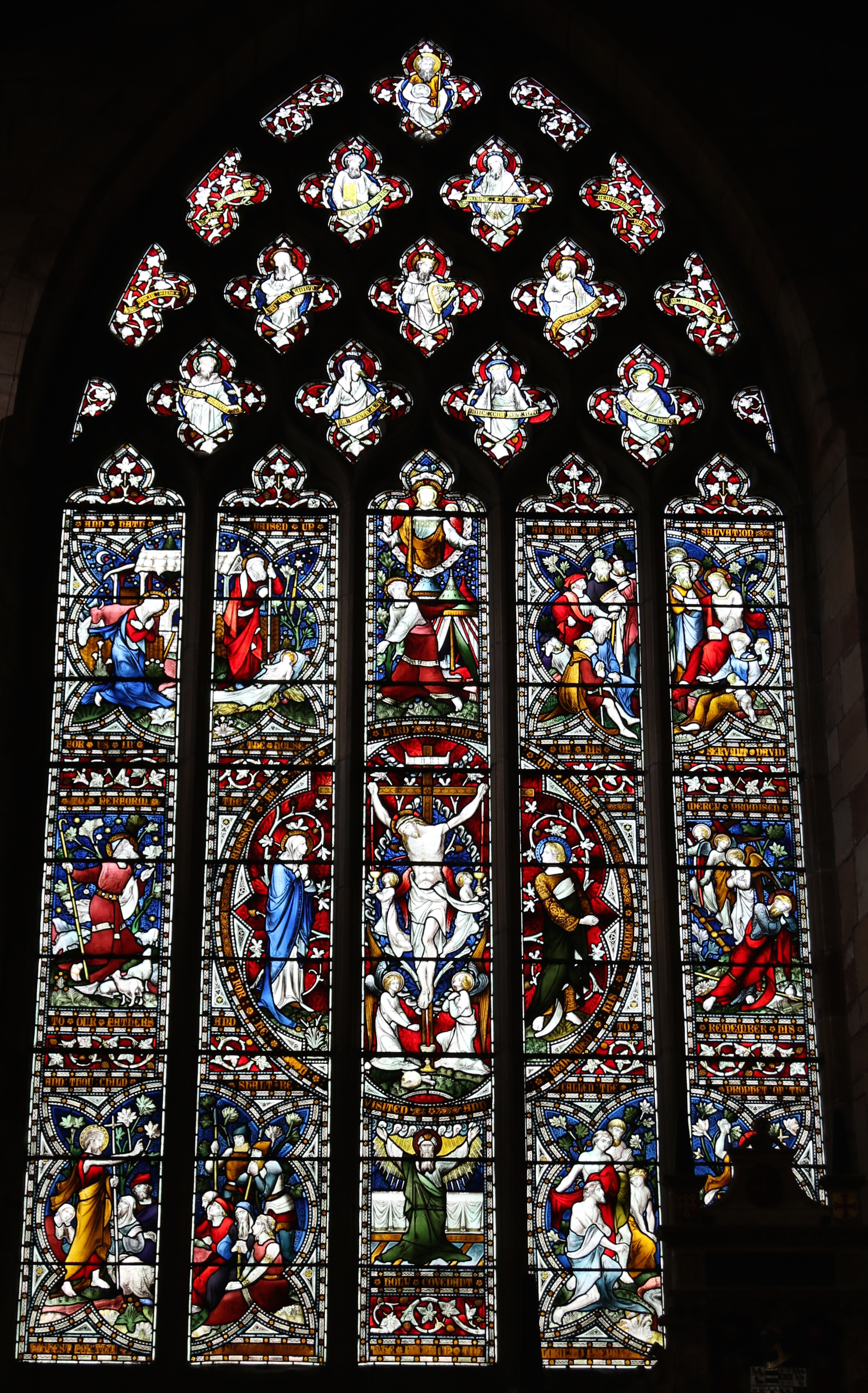
North transept window showing the Benedictus by Hardman and Co.

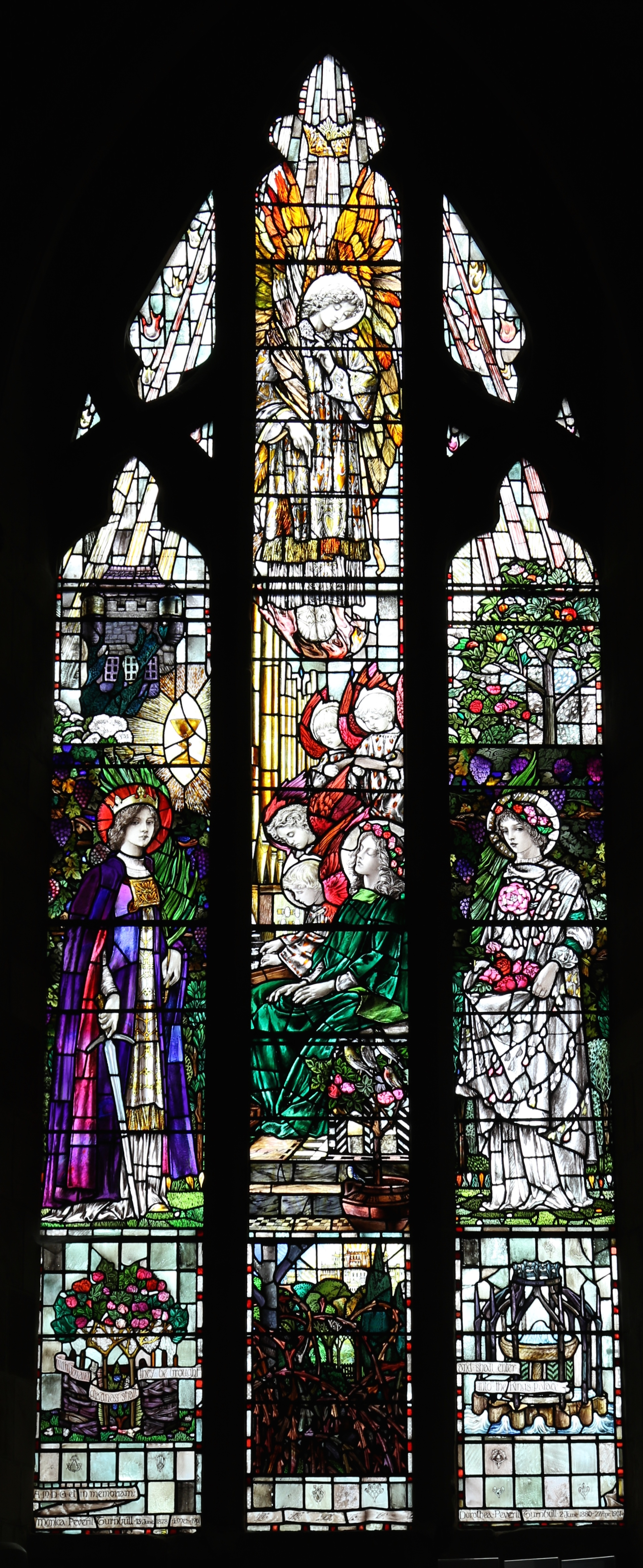
Memorial to the Turnbull daughters by Christopher Whall

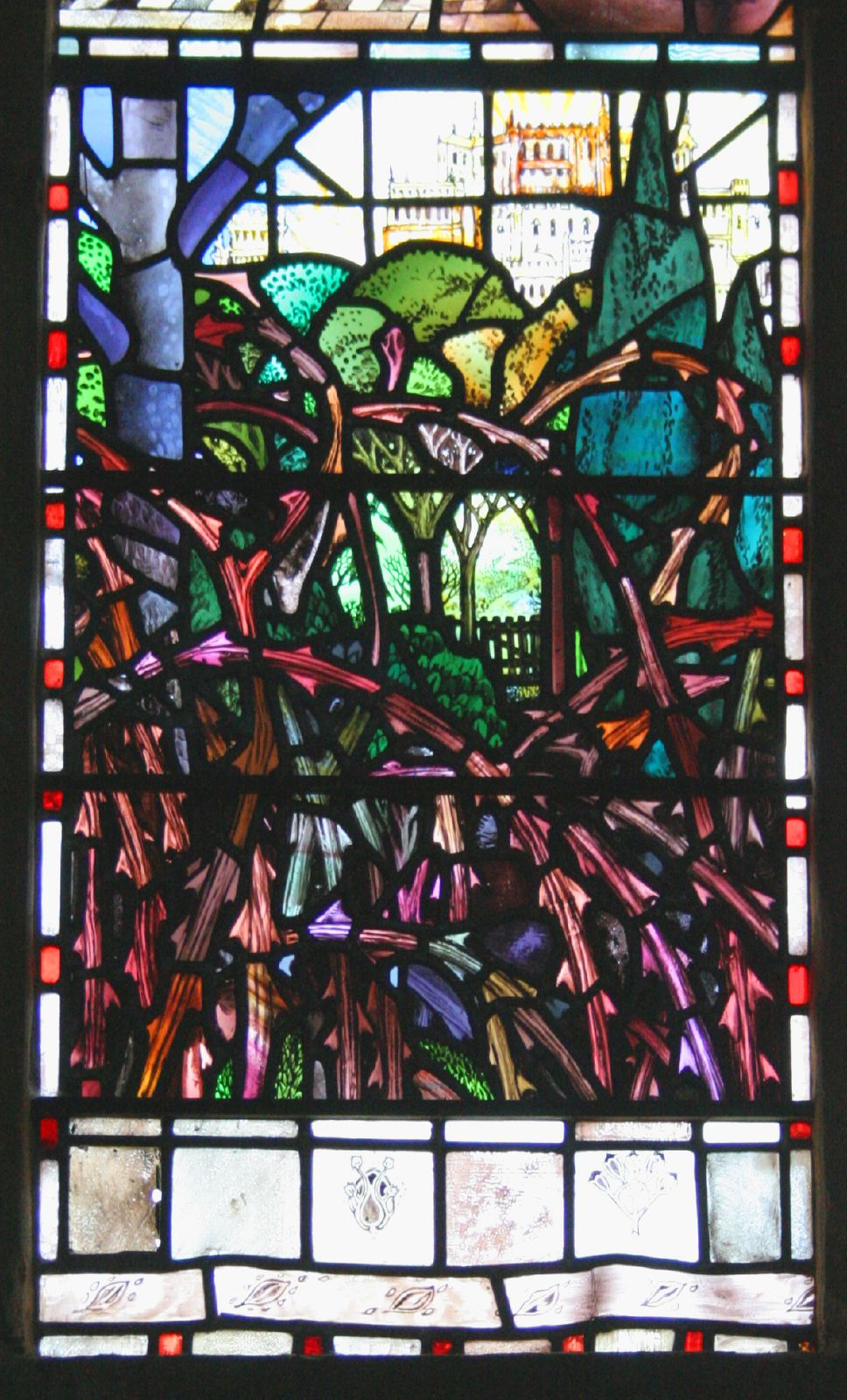
Detail of the Christopher Whall window

== Memorials ==
Each of its transepts houses a chapel dedicated to leading local families. In the north transept, the Cockaynes, and the Boothbys (who bought their home Ashbourne Hall in the early 18th century). In the south transept is the Bradbourne's chapel. These chapels contain funerary monuments which have contributed greatly to the church's renown.

One in particular stands out; the Boothby monument to Penelope Boothby, daughter of Sir Brooke Boothby, 6th Baronet. It is an exquisite and highly realistic sculpture made from Carrara marble (Italian) in the form of a sleeping child. It is considered to be the masterpiece of the artist Thomas Banks, and was commissioned by Penelope's father. There is an inscription on the tomb from Dante, one in French, one in Latin. That in English reads "She was in form and intellect most exquisite. The unfortunate Parents ventured their all on this frail Bark. And the wreck was total."

Other monuments and inscriptions in the church recall the generations of Boothbys buried there. Sir Brooke Boothby was a minor poet, now known mainly for the sonnets which he wrote after his daughter's death – "[Sorrows Sacred to the Memory of Penelope", which was illustrated with engravings of pictures by Fuseli and Glover. During his life he published several times on the church's inscriptions. It was said that he never recovered from the loss of his daughter and he died in poverty in Boulogne-sur-Mer in 1824.

The churchyard contains war graves of two soldiers of World War I and an army officer of World War II.

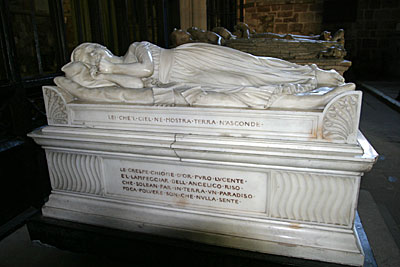
The Boothby Monument

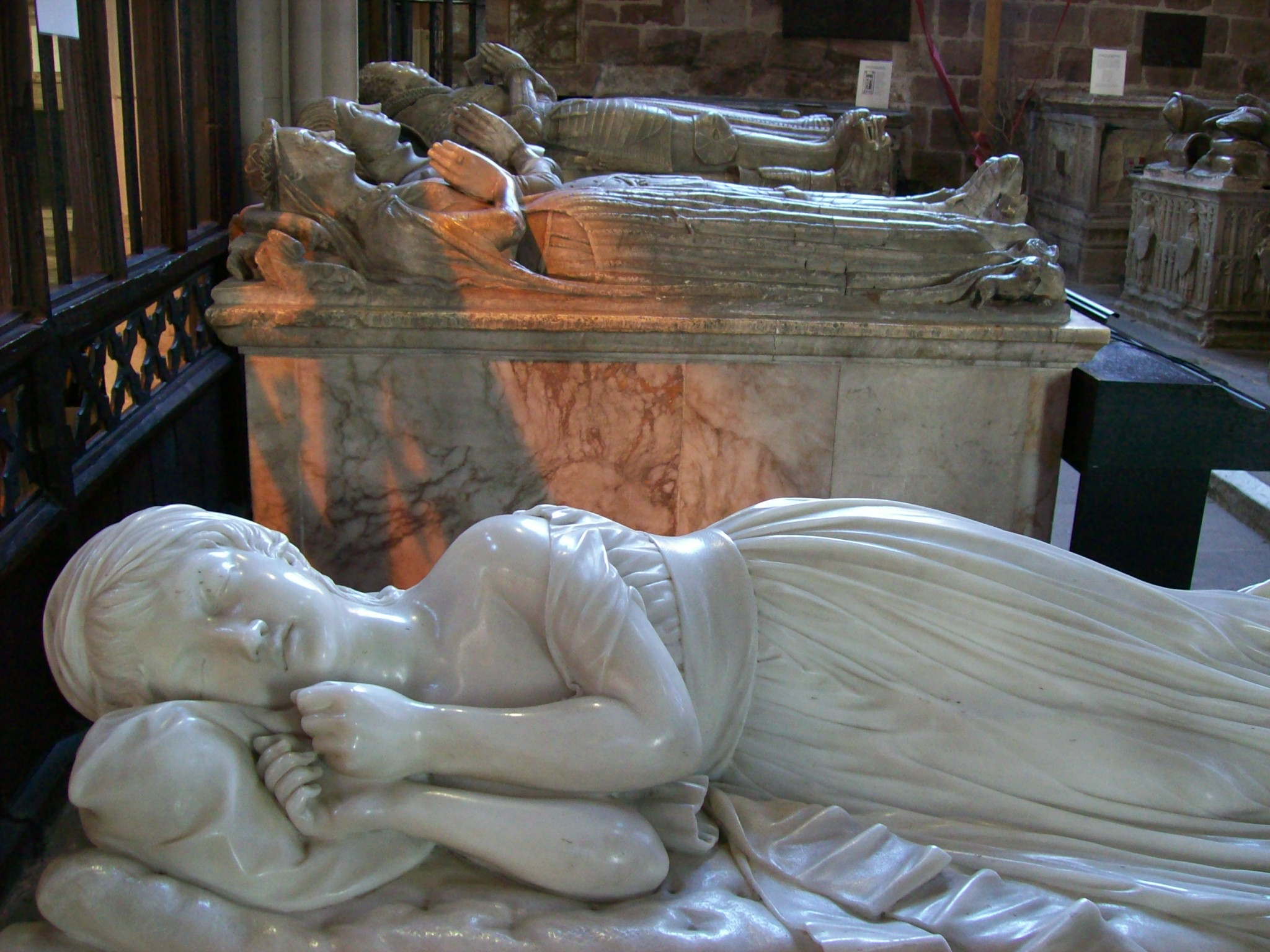
Another view of the tomb of Penelope Boothby

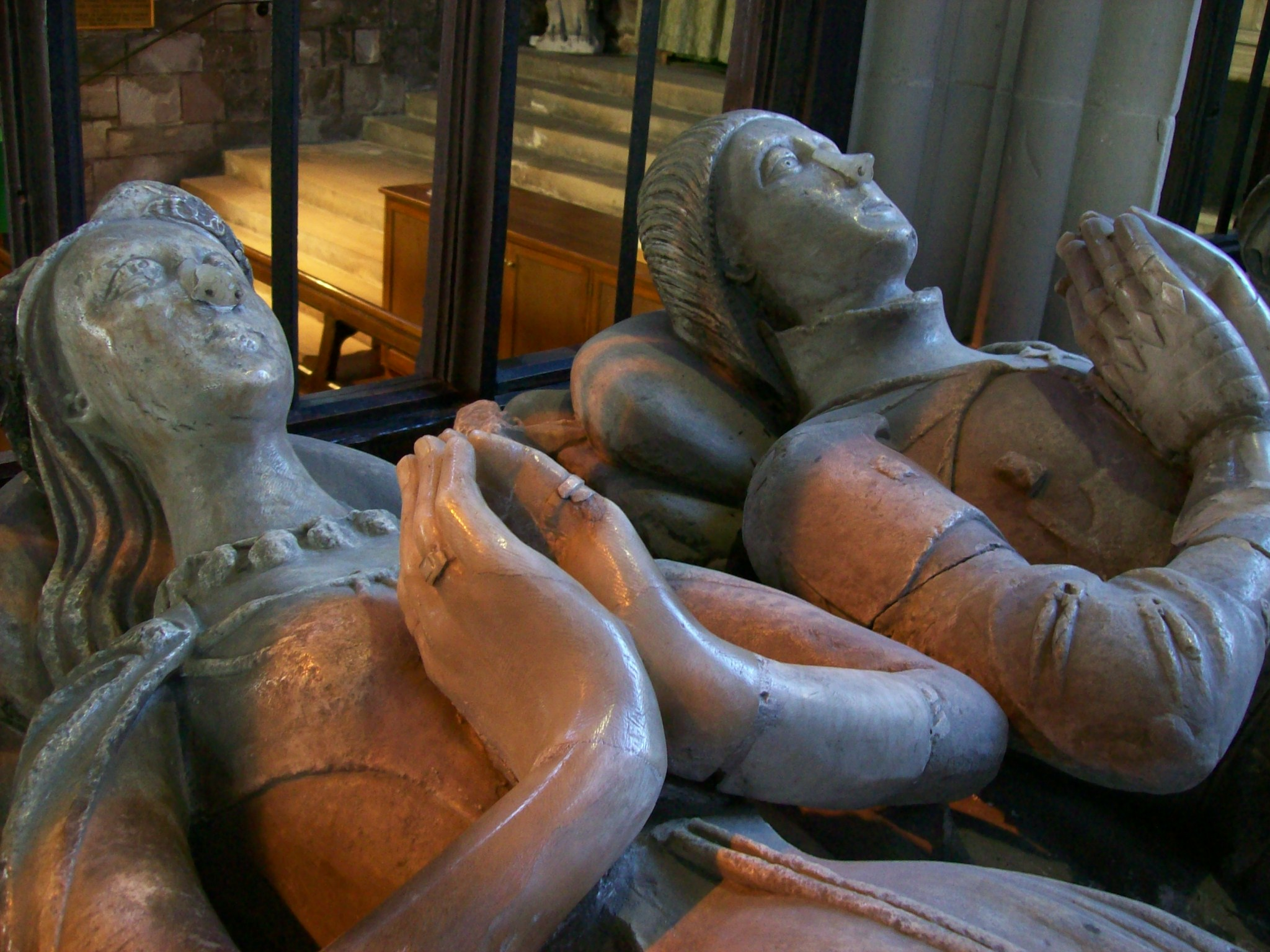
Memorial to John and Anne Bradbourne

== Vicars of Ashbourne ==
- Geoffrey
- Nicholas de Esseburne 1200
- William 1231–1233
- Walter de Keyiam 1241
- John de Brecham
- Peter de WIntonia 1260
- Nicholas 1275
- Hugh de Ashburne 1278
- Robertus 1290
- Thomas de Welleton 1300
- Robert de Stoke 1310
- Robert Ible 1310
- John de Lenton 1333
- Roger de la Dale 1349
- William Rymour de Newenham 1361
- William de Exton 1362
- John de Hylle 1363
- William Newenham 1364
- William Prate (or Poyner)
- Hugh de Montgomery 1371
- Ruchard de Thrumley 1373
- Thomas Brouster (or Brondeston) 1379
- Thomas de Hulton 1380
- William Borgh 1394
- William Melton 1394
- Roger de Knyveton 1408
- William Dalton 1408
- William Newerk 1410
- John Sutton
- Thomas Derby 1433
- Richard Forde
- Adam Wetton 1439
- John Clarke 1453
- John Northampton 1470
- Stephen Surtas 1497
- Henry Hudson 1500
- William Tykhill
- Robert Sacheverel 1526
- Laurence Horobyn 1535
- Christopher Hauke or Hawke
- William Bythinge 1564
- Robert Hurte 1566
- Thomas Peacock 1603
- William Wayne 1643
- Samuel Moore 1653
- Thomas Brown 1660
- Thomas Goodread 1669
- John Manson 1702
- Nathaniel Boothouse 1705
- Abraham Jeacocke 1717
- John Boydell 1719
- Luke Hutchinson 1731
- John Fitzherbert 1749
- William Webb 1772
- Samuel Shipley 1806
- John Richard Errington 1850
- Edward Marsham Moore 1872
- Alfred Olivier 1876
- Francis Jourdain 1878
- Ernest Edwin Morris 1898
- Francis Longsdon Shaw 1924
- Philip Charles Thurlow Crick 1935
- Alfred Ellis Farrow 1937
- Claude Charles W Trendell 1949
- Frederick John Henry Lisemore 1957
- William Gerald Armstrong
- David Henry Sansum 1976
- Michael Smith 1998
- Duncan Ballard

== Organ ==
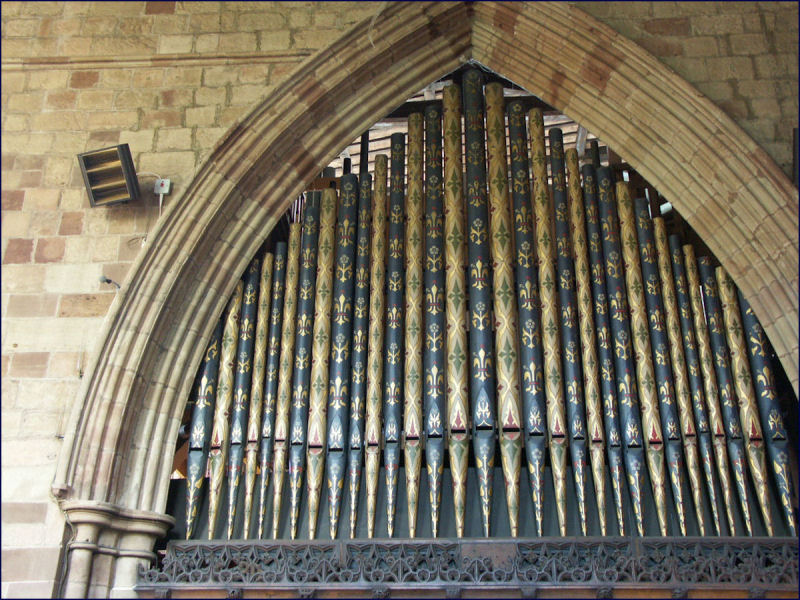
The organ pipes in the chancel

A new organ by Valentine of Leicester was installed in 1710. An organ was obtained in 1826 by the builder Parsons. It was enlarged in 1840. The current organ dates from 1858 when it was installed at a cost of £800 and may contain pipework from an eighteenth-century instrument. It has had several restorations, including by Hill and Son in 1858, Hill again in 1876, Hill, Norman and Beard in 1950–51, 1982 and 2011 by Henry Groves & Son. A specification of the organ can be found on the National Pipe Organ Register.

=== Organists and music directors ===
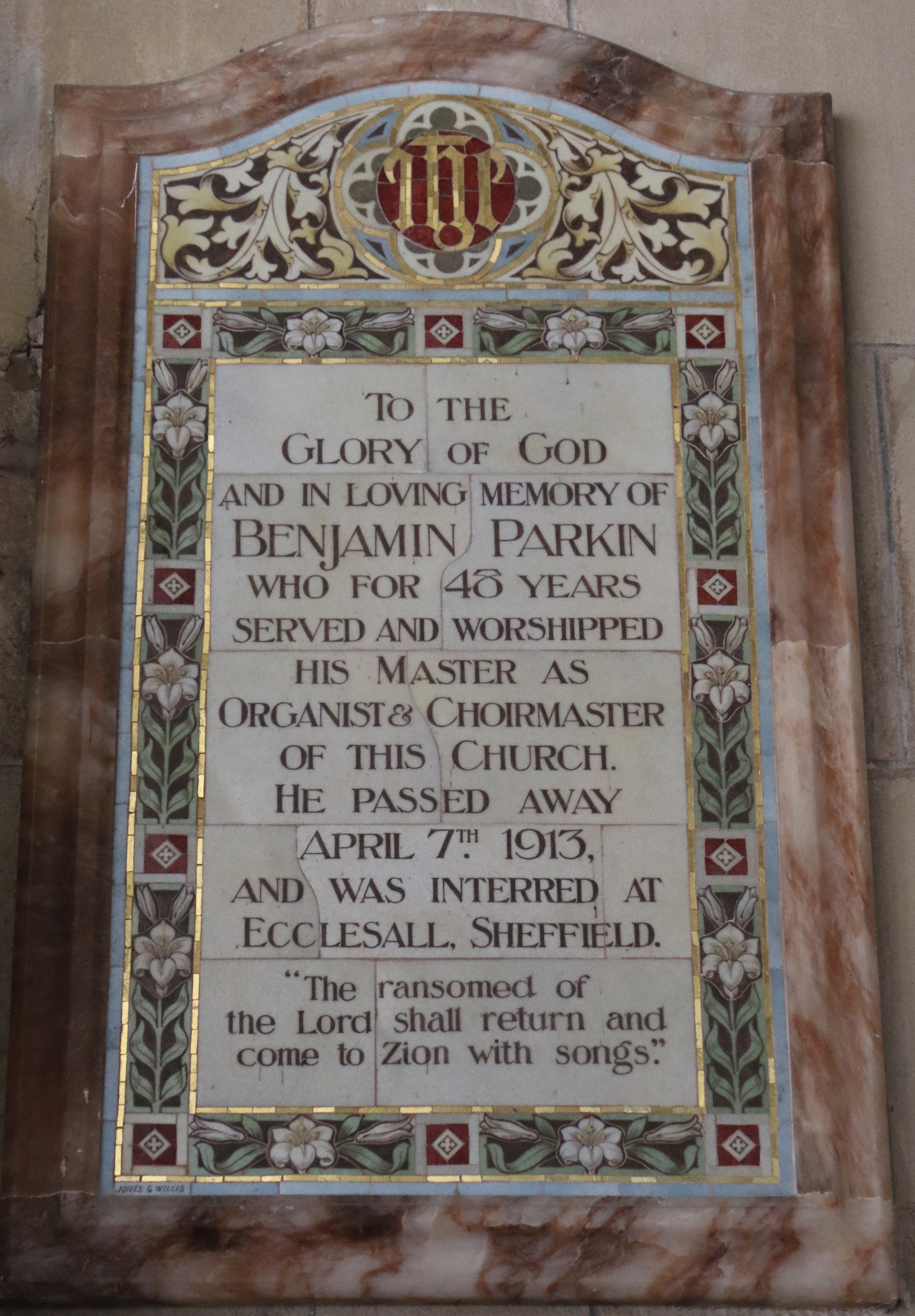
Memorial to Benjamin Parkin

- Mr Binnell (c.1746–unknown)
- Edward Simms (c.1797–1832)
- George Frederick Simms (c.1832–34) (formerly organist of St Mary's Church, Wirksworth)
- Andrew Loder (1834–38) (formerly organist of the Octagon Chapel, Bath)
- Robert William Henry Burrage (1840–44) (formerly assistant organist at Norwich Cathedral)
- Andrew Alleyne Loder (c.1846–1859)
- Benjamin Parkin (c.1856–1904)
- J. Scott Allen (1904) (formerly organist of Disley Parish Church, Stockport)
- George Frederick Handel Kemp (ca. 1906–36)
- Chris Daly Atkinson (c.1944–92)
- Michael Halls (c.1946)

== Cultural associations ==
St Oswald's bells inspired lines in Lalla Rookh by Thomas Moore, who lived in the area for four years:

Those evening bells! Those evening bells!
How many a tale their music tells
Of youth and home and that sweet time
When last I heard their soothing chime.

Those joyous hours are passed away:
And many a heart that then was gay
Within the tomb now darkly dwells
And hears no more those evening bells.

And so 'twill be when I am gone:
That tuneful peal will still ring on
While other bards shall walk these dells,
And sing your praise, sweet evening bells.

== See also ==
- Grade I listed churches in Derbyshire
- Listed buildings in Ashbourne, Derbyshire
