= Penelope Boothby =

British art model and subject of poetry (1785–1791)

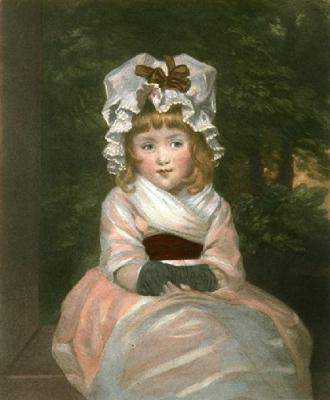
- Penelope Boothby in 1788 in a painting by Joshua Reynolds
- Born: 11 April 1785; Lichfield
- Died: 13 March 1791 (aged 5); Ashbourne, Derbyshire
- Occupation: Model

Penelope Boothby (11 April 1785 – 13 March 1791) was a girl who has become one of the most famous child characters in British art. Her image inspired the paintings by Joshua Reynolds, Henry Fuseli, John Everett Millais, a sculpture by Thomas Banks, photographs of Lewis Carroll, as well as sonnets of Brooke Boothby, her father.

According to art historians and historians, in the art of the 19th–20th centuries Penelope Boothby became a classic child of the Romantic era, the keeper of heavenly innocence, a symbol of "what we have lost and what we are afraid to lose". The image of Penelope was actively exploited by popular culture throughout the 20th century.

== Biography ==
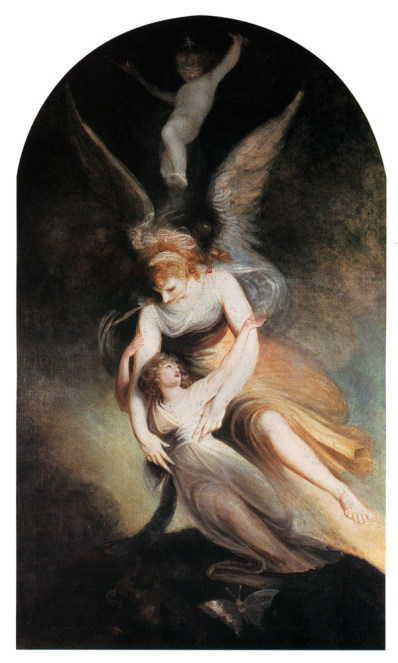
The Apotheosis of Penelope Boothby by Henry Fuseli

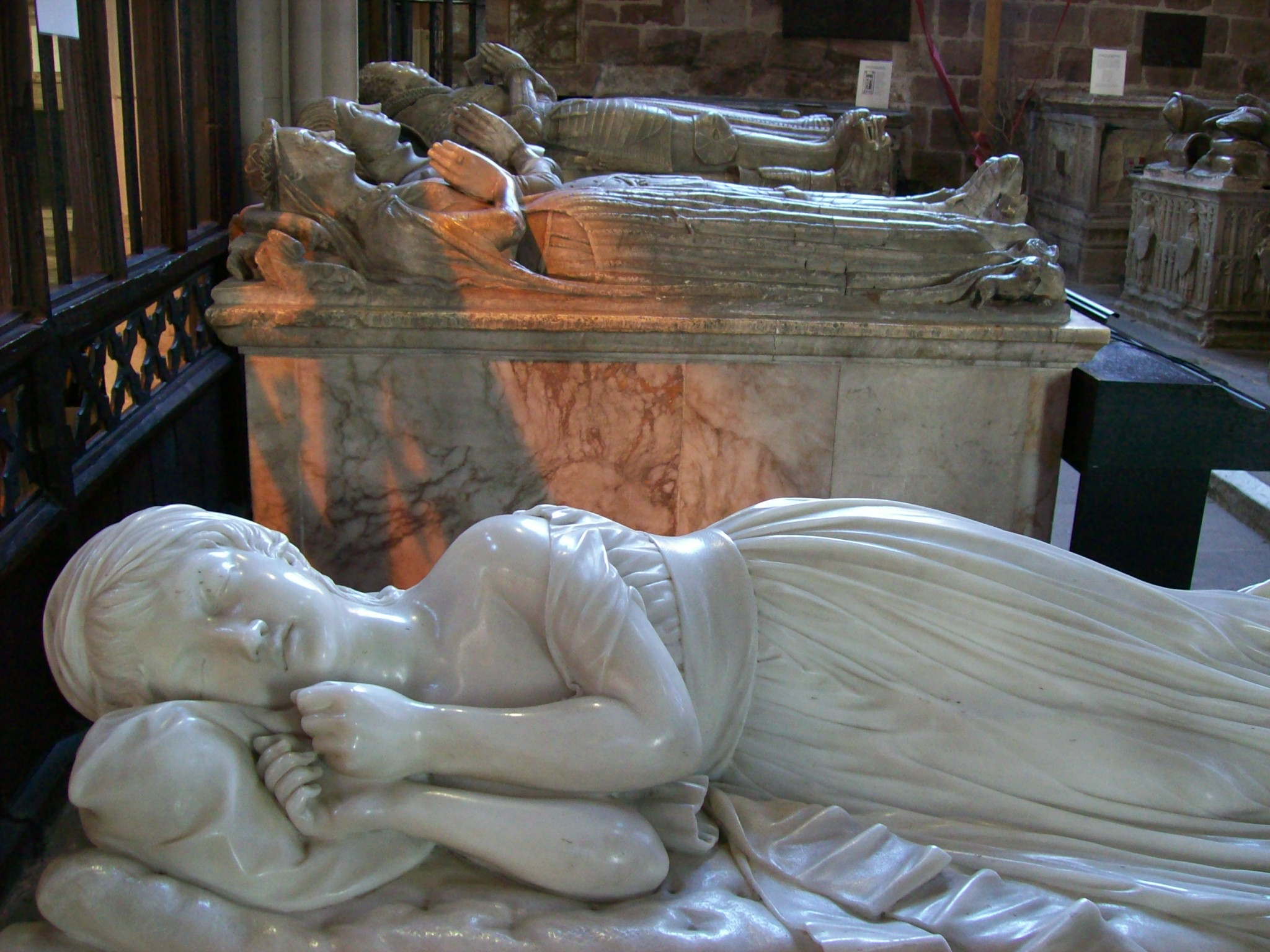
Tomb of Penelope Boothby by Thomas Banks (1793) in St Oswald's Church, Ashbourne

Penelope was the daughter of Sir Brooke Boothby, 6th Baronet (1744–1824), linguist, translator and poet, and his wife, Susanna Bristoe (1755–1822). Boothby highly appreciated the ideas of Jean-Jacques Rousseau and was the translator of his works. Penelope's father inherited the title in 1789, was also an amateur botanist, and collaborated in his research with Erasmus Darwin. He was well acquainted with several activists of the Blue Stockings Society, and was known as a connoisseur of fine arts and philanthropist.

At the age of three (in July 1788), Penelope became a model for the artist Joshua Reynolds in his London studio, for the painting Portrait of Penelope Boothby, or The Mob Cap (now held in the National Gallery).

Shortly after the completion of the portrait, Boothby and his daughter returned to Derbyshire, where his family estate at Ashbourne was located. Penelope probably spent the rest of her short life at Ashbourne Hall. Penelope was a quiet girl who preferred playing with dolls in solitude to any noisy fuss, although she had a cheerful disposition. She loved her father very much and waited at the gates of his return home, and in the evenings sat on his lap. On Sundays in the morning, she accompanied her mother to the Ashbourne parish church and knelt beside her during the service. All this and much more can be learned from the book Sorrows Sacred to the Memory of Penelope, written by her father. The book includes 24 sonnets. She died in 1791 at age 5 years, 11 months, after an illness that lasted about a month. She was unsuccessfully treated by Erasmus Darwin.

Her grieving father memorialised his child with the commission of a painting by Henry Fuseli depicting Penelope taken up to heaven in the arms of an angel; and also a sculpture by Thomas Banks for her tomb in St Oswald's Church, Ashbourne that depicts her asleep.
