= Sir Brooke Boothby, 6th Baronet =

British linguist, translator, poet and landowner (1744–1824)

Sir Brooke Boothby Bt
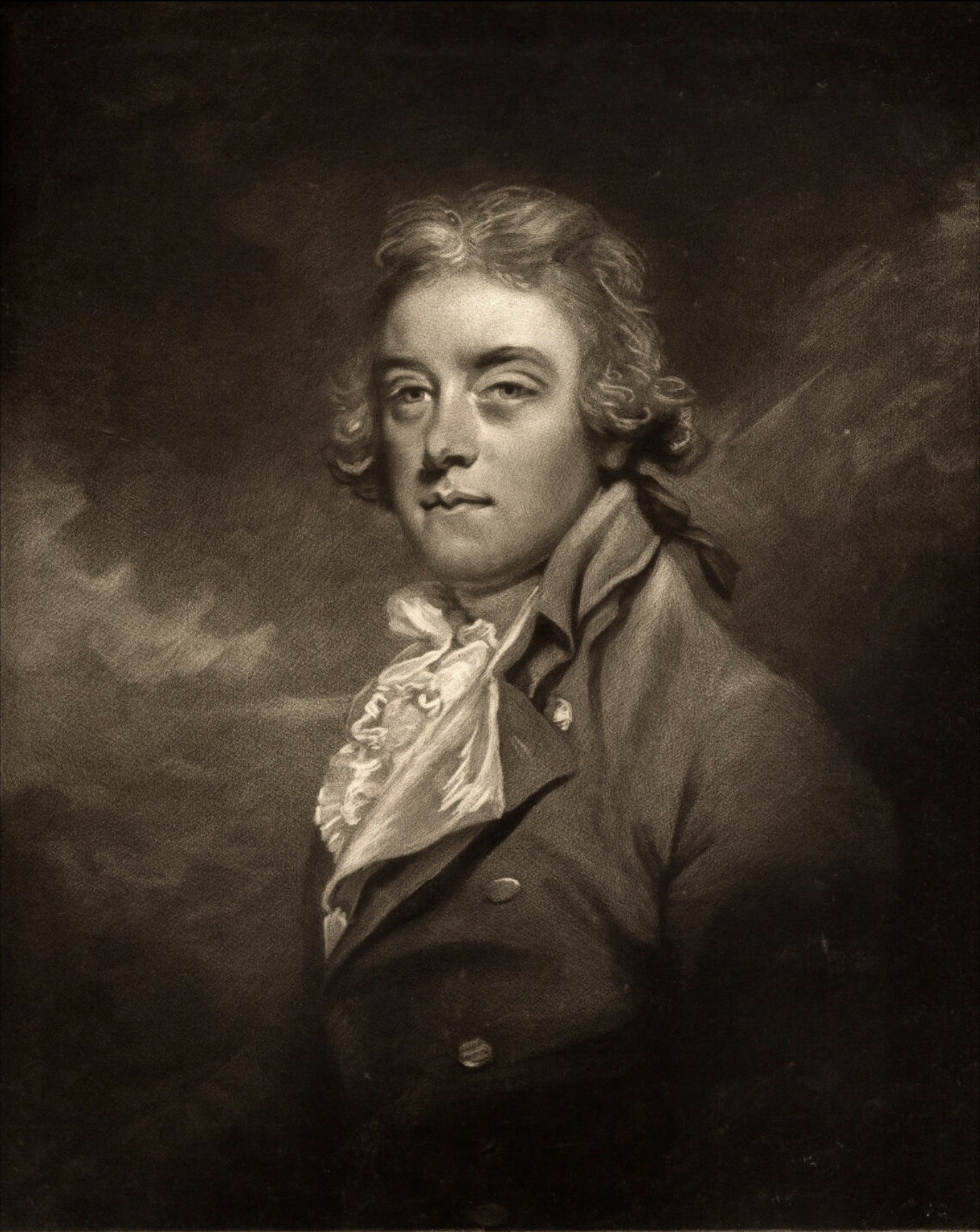
- Engraving by John Raphael Smith after a Sir Joshua Reynolds portrait, 1797
- Born: 3 June 1744; Ashbourne, Derbyshire, England, Great Britain
- Died: 23 January 1824; Boulogne, Paris, France
- Burial place: St Oswald's Church, Ashbourne, Derbyshire, England
- Education: St John's College, Cambridge
- Occupations: Translator, poet, landowner
- Title: 6th Baronet Boothby, of Broadlow Ash
- Spouse: Susanna Bristoe
- Children: Penelope
- Parent(s): Sir Brooke Boothby, 5th Bt. Phoebe Hollins

Sir Brooke Boothby, 6th Baronet (3 June 1744 – 23 January 1824) was a British linguist, translator, poet and landowner, based in Derbyshire, England. He was part of the intellectual and literary circle of Lichfield, which included Anna Seward and Erasmus Darwin. In 1766, he welcomed the philosopher Jean-Jacques Rousseau to Ashbourne circles, after Rousseau's short stay in London with Hume. Ten years later, in 1776, Boothby visited Rousseau in Paris, and he was given the manuscript of the first part of Rousseau's three-part autobiographic Rousseau Judge of Jean-Jacques. Boothby published it in Lichfield in 1780 after the author's death and donated the document to the British Museum in 1781. It is now in the British Library (Add MS 4925).

The well-known portrait of Boothby by Joseph Wright of Derby, from 1781, shows him reclining in a wooded glade with a book carrying on its cover simply the name Rousseau, indicating Boothby's admiration and promotion of the writer and his work generally. Several portraits were also made of Boothby's daughter, Penelope—by Henry Fuseli and Joshua Reynolds and in sculpture by Thomas Banks. She died young and was the subject of a book of poetry by her grieving father.

== Biography ==
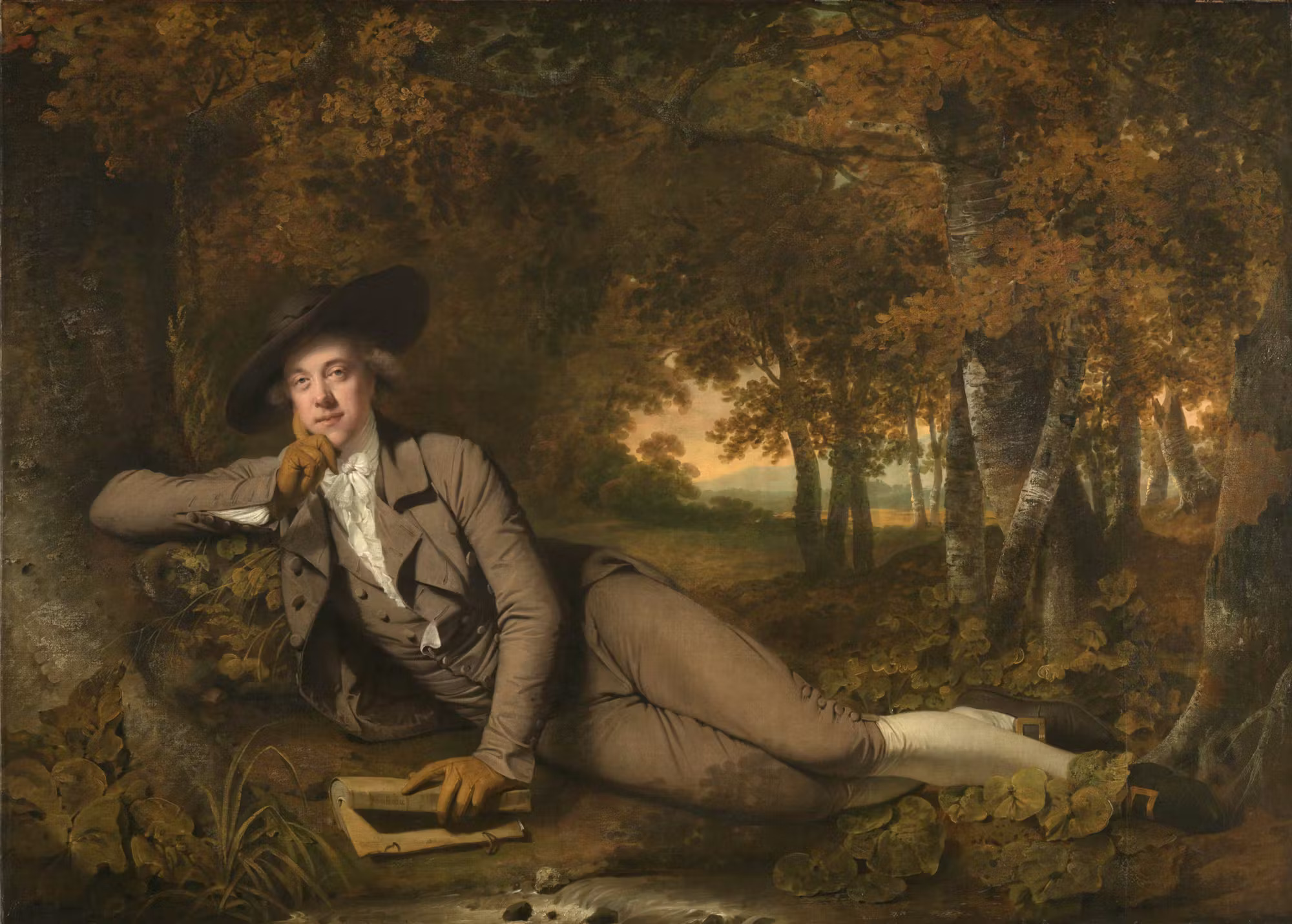
Portrait of Sir Brooke Boothby by Joseph Wright of Derby, 1781

Boothby was born in 1744. He inherited his unusual forename from Hill Brooke, the second wife of the fourth Baronet Boothby, of Broadlow Ash, Sir William. Brooke Boothby is sometimes referred to as the seventh Baronet as there was some confusion over the appointment of the first Baronet. He was educated at St John's College, Cambridge, matriculating in 1761.

Boothby was active in local intellectual life as an associate of the scientific group, the Lunar Society which was interested in the application of the sciences to modern life and its development, and the Lichfield Botanical Society. He, members of the Lunar Society and the intellectual circle of Lichfield, met the free-thinking Jean-Jacques Rousseau who fled from France in 1766–7 and was staying at Wootton, near Boothby's home, Ashbourne Hall.

Boothby later visited Rousseau in Paris and promised him that he would publish his Rousseau Judge of Jean-Jacques. He did so in 1780, Rousseau having died in 1778. This achievement is immortalised in Joseph Wright of Derby's painting. The portrait shows Boothby reclining by a stream in a wooded glade once known as the Twenty Oaks, where he and Rousseau met for discussion and where Rousseau went to write in peace and solitude. He is holding a leather-bound book with the name Rousseau on the spine rather than a specific title, thus referencing Boothby's interest in the philosopher's entire oeuvre. The landscape setting can be interpreted as referring to the Rousseauian idea that all of man's troubles and unhappiness derive from his self-removal from the natural world. According to Andrew Graciano, the plants in the setting refer to Boothby's interest in botany and the botanical aspect of the painting has previously been ignored. Both Boothby and Rousseau were interested in botany and Rousseau studied local flora when he lived at Wootton Hall.

Two other of Wright's paintings of Dovedale were sold to Brooke Boothby who had helped Wright when he put on the first one-man exhibition in London. Boothby also purchased two views of nearby Matlock, two paintings of bridges in Rome as well as the unusual portrait of himself.

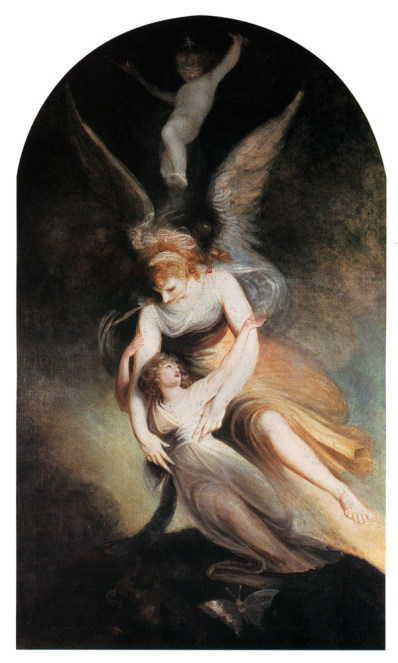
Henry Fuseli, The Apotheosis of Penelope Boothby, 1792

In 1784, Boothby married Susanna Bristoe, daughter of Robert Bristoe and Susanna Philipson, and in that year he leased Ashbourne Hall from his father, whose extravagance had forced him to live elsewhere whilst renting out the family seat. He began the restoration of Ashbourne Hall, using his wife's dowry to renovate the structure, remodel the parkland, purchase rare plants and obtain works of art. Like his father before him, Boothby was extravagant in the extreme. That weakness and his emotional self-indulgence were to be his nemeses. His only daughter, Penelope, was born in the following April. Sir Joshua Reynold's portrait of Penelope, often called "The Mob Cap", is one of the most famous of English child portraits. Reynolds had painted portraits of Boothby and his younger half-sister Anne. His full sister, Maria, was portrayed by Wright a decade before he painted the famous portrait of Brooke Boothby himself.

On 19 March 1791, disaster struck when Boothby's daughter died at the age of five. This sad event permanently affected him and he subsequently published a book of poetry, Sorrows Sacred to the Memory of Penelope. Penelope had a remarkable tomb constructed for her which included a life-size statue of her sleeping. The tomb is in St Oswald's Church in Ashbourne along with many other Boothby memorials and graves.

Boothby's life went into decline after his daughter's death. He commissioned the sculpture illustrated and the painting by Henry Fuseli. After Penelope's funeral, his wife Susanna returned to her parents' home in Hampshire and settled in Dover. Her death was recorded under her maiden name, Bristoe.

Boothby was involved with the substantial purchase of 16th-century stained glass for Lichfield Cathedral in 1801, which he purchased from Herkenrode Abbey which had been dissolved in the Napoleonic wars. He sold the glass to the cathedral on a non-profit basis.

As a result of his extravagance, Boothby met with economic disaster which completely altered the course of his life. Ashbourne Hall was leased in 1814 (parish records show that in 1817, Sir Richard Arkwright's grandson, also Richard, was living there) and he settled in diminished circumstances in Boulogne in 1815 and died there in 1824. He was buried in St Oswald's Church, Ashbourne with his parents, his sister Maria Elizabeth and other Boothby family members.

== Sonnet XII ==
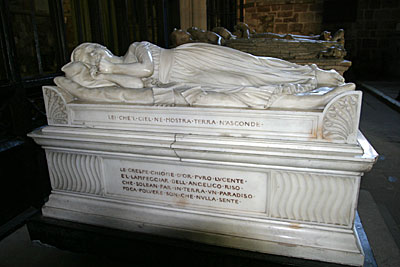
The Boothby Monument, described as being so lifelike that the child could be sleeping, is inscribed with an epitaph to Penelope's honour: "She was in form and intellect most exquisite. The unfortunate Parents ventured their all on this frail Bark. And the wreck was total"

Well has thy classick chisel, Banks, express'd
The graceful lineaments of that fine form,
Which late with conscious, living beauty warm,
Now here beneath does in dread silence rest.
And, oh, while life shall agitate my breast,
Recorded there exists her every charm,
In vivid colours, safe from change or harm,
Till my last sigh unalter'd love attest.
That form, as fair as ever fancy drew,
The marble cold, inanimate, retains;
But of the radiant smile that round her threw
Joys, that beguiled my soul of mortal pains,
And each divine expression's varying hue,
A little senseless dust alone remains

== Major works ==
- Letter to the Right Honourable Edmund Burke, 1790
- Observations on the Appeal from the New to the Old Whigs, 1792
- Sorrows. Sacred to the Memory of Penelope, 1796
- Venality, 1793 and 1802
- Translation of Jean Racine's Britannicus, 1803
- Fables and Satires, 1809, Edinburgh
- Translation of Molière's Le Misanthrope, 1819
- The Fudger Fudged, 1819

== See also ==
- Henry Fuseli's The Nightmare, which was bought by Boothby

Baronetage of England
| Preceded by Brooke Boothby | Baronet (of Broadlow Ash); 1789–1824 | Succeeded by William Boothby |
