= Green Man, Ashbourne =

Hotel and public house in Ashbourne, Derbyshire, England

Coordinates: 53.0172°N 1.733016°W

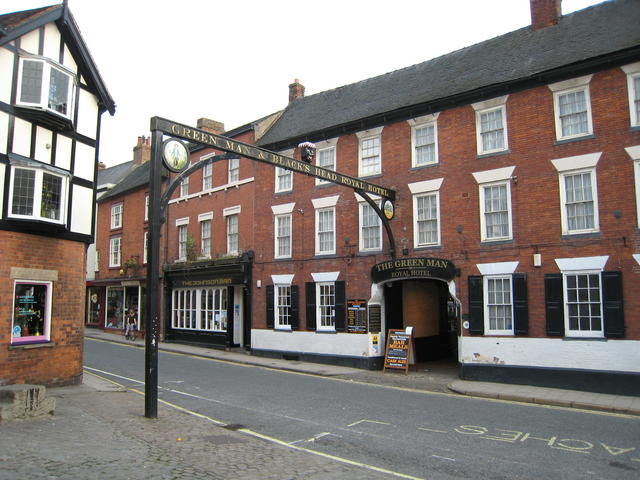
Pub and sign in 2007

The Green Man & Black's Head Royal Hotel (sometimes simply the Green Man) is a public house and hotel on St John Street (the A515) in the town centre of Ashbourne, Derbyshire. The premises is known for its Grade II* listed entrance sign and its association with Royal Shrovetide Football.

== History ==
There has been a pub in this location since the 1750s. James Boswell wrote that he stopped there to eat in 1777 (terming it "a very good inn" and its proprietress "a mighty civil gentlewoman") and Princess Victoria visited in the 1830s.

The pub closed in 2012 following a period of decline. The owner worked with local architects, conservation group Brownhill Hayward Brown, Derbyshire County Council and Historic England to produce a suitable refurbishment plan that would be a sustainable business model while still preserving the building's historic character. It reopened to customers in 2018. It has since been praised for helping to revitalise the town's economy.

== Architecture ==
The sign over the road adjacent to the pub was constructed in 1825 when the Green Man and Blackmoor Inn were joined. There are two pictures on either side of the sign depicting a man dressed in green tweeds and wearing a green hat. On one side, the man is carrying a gun; on the other he is shooting wildfowl. The sign was Grade II listed in 1951, and updated to Grade II* in 1974.

The gallows-type sign is mentioned in the Guinness World Records as being the longest inn sign in the world. It was damaged by a lorry strike in 2006, but subsequently repaired.

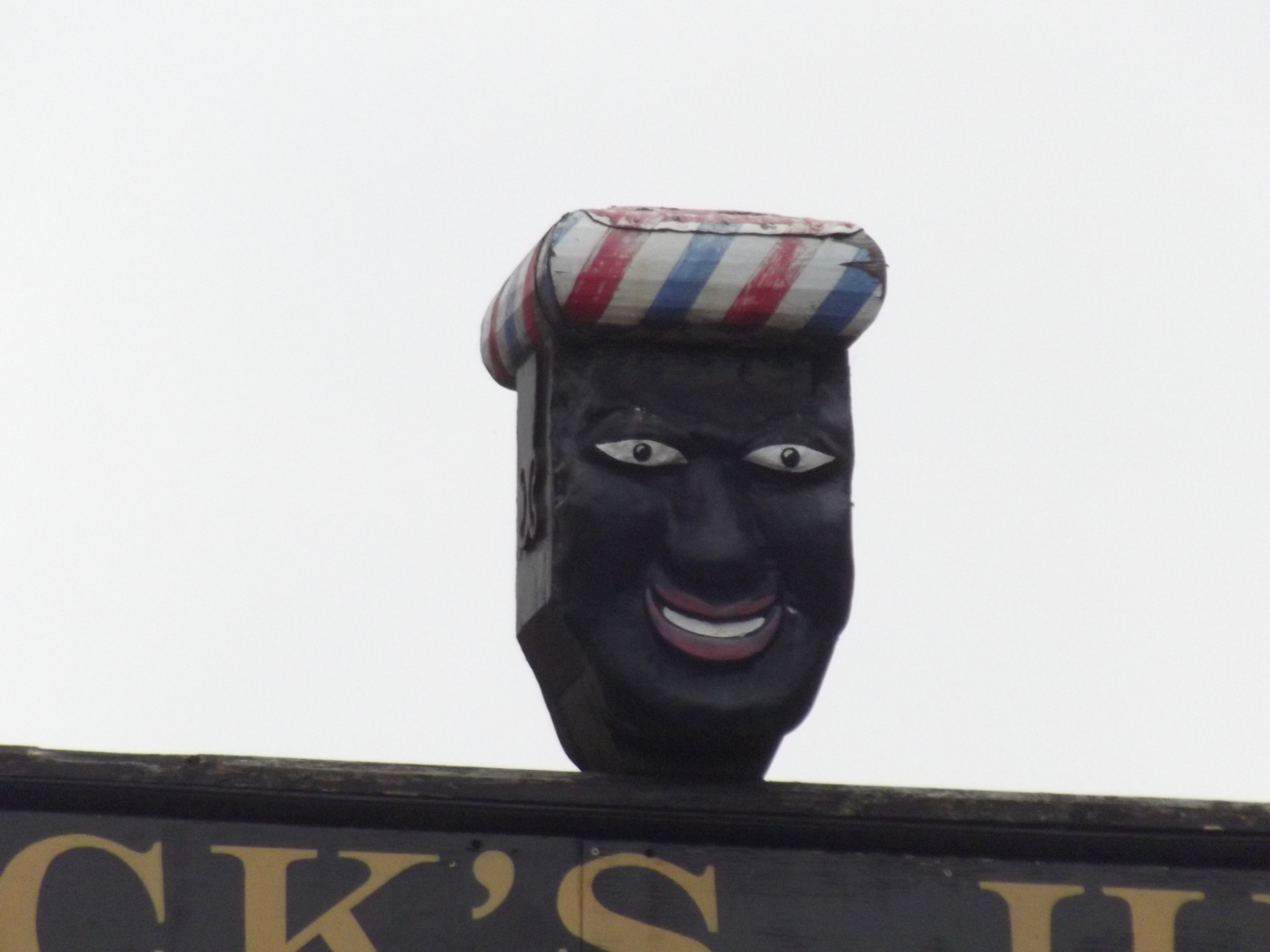
Sculpture on the sign of the Green Man and Black's Head Royal Hotel

The sign features an effigy of a black man's head. In June 2020, during the George Floyd protests in the United Kingdom, a 28,000-signature petition called for it to be taken down, describing it at "disgusting racist imagery". Derbyshire Dales District Council said it would remove the head as soon as possible, but locals removed it the same day, saying they had done so to protect it from vandalism, adding it would be restored with "a lick of black paint" and reinstalled at a later date. The council, however, decided against replacing the controversial head, and its future currently remains undecided.

== Sport ==
The Green Man is well known locally for being a focal point of the annual Royal Shrovetide Football match. A roll of honour, listing throwers and scorers since the late 19th century, is displayed inside the hotel.

The pub sign has also been used as the finishing line for a soap box race in the town.

== See also ==
- Grade II* listed buildings in Derbyshire Dales
- Listed buildings in Ashbourne, Derbyshire
