= Listed buildings in Ashbourne, Derbyshire =

Ashbourne is a civil parish and a town in the Derbyshire Dales district of Derbyshire, England. The parish contains over 160 listed buildings that are recorded in the National Heritage List for England. Of these, three are listed at Grade I, the highest of the three grades, eleven are at Grade II*, the middle grade, and the others are at Grade II, the lowest grade. Ashbourne has been a market town since the 13th century, and it stood on the old road from London to Manchester. Most of the listed buildings are houses, cottages and associated structures, shops and offices. The other listed buildings include churches and chapels, hotels and public houses, schools, almshouses, public buildings, banks, a milestone, a former toll house, a former railway engine house, a war memorial arch, and telephone kiosks.

== Key ==
Grade	Criteria
I	Buildings of exceptional interest, sometimes considered to be internationally important
II*	Particularly important buildings of more than special interest
II	Buildings of national importance and special interest

== Buildings ==
Name and location	Photograph	Date	Notes	Grade
St Oswald's Church; 53.01499°N 1.73862°W		c. 1220	A large church that retains earlier fabric, it has been enlarged and altered through the centuries, including restorations in 1837–40 by L. N. Cottingham, in 1873 and 1876–78 by George Gilbert Scott, and in 1881–82 by G. L. Abbott. The church is built in stone, and consists of a nave, a south aisle, north and south transepts with east aisles, a chancel, and a steeple at the crossing. The steeple is 212 feet (65 m) high, and has a tower with two-light bell openings and a pierced trefoil parapet, and a spire with four tiers of lucarnes, and to the southeast is a stair tower with an octagonal spirelet.	I
7 Market Place; 53.01794°N 1.73237°W	—	1420	The building has a timber framed core, dated by dendrochronology, and the exterior dates from the late 18th century. This is stuccoed, with imitation timber framing, and the roof is tiled. There are two storeys and two bays. In the ground floor is a central gabled porch flanked by projecting extensions, and the upper floor contains casement windows.	II
4 Victoria Square; 53.01756°N 1.73316°W		1493	A timber framed shop, at one time the Tiger Inn, dated by dendrochronology, it is encased in brick on the front, roughcast in the upper part, and with exposed timber framing at the rear. There is one bay and two storeys, the upper storey and the gable jettied. In the ground floor is a modern shop front, and above is a casement window and a bargeboard on the gable.	II
16 Market Place; 53.01818°N 1.73206°W	—	Mid 16th century	A shop with living accommodation above and a timber framed core, later refronted in red brick. There are three storeys and two bays and a parapet. In the ground floor is a 20th-century shop front, the middle floor contains sash windows, and the top floor 20th-century replacements, all with wedge lintels. In the side passage and at the rear is exposed timber framing with brick nogging.	II
Old Grammar School; 53.01580°N 1.73751°W		1586	The former school is in stone, and has two storeys and attics, and a symmetrical front of six bays, all gabled with obelisk finials. The outer bays are wider and each contains a doorway approached by steps, each with fluted pilasters on pedestals, an entablature, and a four-centred arched head with decorative spandrels. Above the left doorway is an armorial panel with a moulded hood. In the outer part of each outer bay is a doorway with a plain surround. The windows in the ground floor are mullioned and transomed, and in the upper floor and attics they are mullioned with arched lights.	I
33 St John's Street; 53.01800°N 1.73126°W	—	c. 1605	A cottage with a timber framed core, and a front of 19th-century stucco, with a sundial and a tile roof. There are two storeys and two bays. The upper floor windows are 19th-century casements, and in the ground floor are modern replacements. Inside there is exposed timber framing.	II
Owlfield's Almshouses; 53.01581°N 1.73662°W		1614–30	The almshouses are in stone and have a tile roof with coped gables. There is a single storey with attics, and five bays. On the front are eight doorways with four-centred arches, two of which have a panel above with a Latin inscription. The windows are mullioned, and there are three later gabled dormers.	II*
24 St John's Street; 53.01745°N 1.73218°W	—	17th century (probable)	A shop with a timber framed core, later refronted in brick. There are two storeys and one bay. In the ground floor is a modern shop front, and above is a two-light window. Inside, a pair of crucks is visible.	II
32 St John's Street; 53.01754°N 1.73201°W	—	17th century	A timber framed shop with a tile roof. There are two storeys, the upper storey jettied, and one bay. In the ground floor is a 19th-century shop front with pilasters, and the upper floor contains a sash window.	II
Ashbourne Gingerbread Shop; 53.01751°N 1.73211°W		17th century	A timber framed shop with a tile roof. There are two storeys, the upper storey jettied, and three bays. In the ground floor are modern shop fronts, and the upper floor contains sash windows. Inside there is exposed timber framing, and on the outside it is false and applied.	II
Hanson Mount; 53.01568°N 1.73801°W	—	17th century	The house, which has been restored, is stuccoed and has a tile roof. There are two storeys and attics, two bays, and a rear outshut. The ground floor contains modern casement windows, in the upper floor are canted oriel windows, and the attics have two gabled dormers.	II
Swiss Cottage; 53.01804°N 1.73117°W		17th century	The cottage is timber framed with a stuccoed exterior and a slate roof. There are two storeys and two bays. On the front is a later shop bow window, to the left of which is a doorway and a passage entry, both with segmental-arched heads. Inside, there is exposed timber framing.	II
Pegg's Almshouses; 53.01586°N 1.73624°W		Soon after 1669	A row of almshouses at right angles to the street, it is in stone with a tile roof. There is a single storey, the doorways have chamfered four-centred arched heads, and the windows are mullioned with two lights. In the gable end facing the street is a panel with armorial carvings and inscriptions. Opposite is a range of outbuildings added in 1848.	II*
The Mansion and wall 53.01564°N 1.73721°W		c. 1685	The façade of the house dates from about 1764, and there were later alterations. The house is in red brick on a plinth, with sill bands, a corbelled eaves cornice, and a parapet with inset balustrades. Thee are three storeys and five bays, the wider middle bay projecting under an open pediment. In the centre is a porch with Tuscan columns and a pediment, above which is a Venetian window and a Diocletian window. The other windows are sashes. At the rear are gables, and an octagonal music room with a Doric porch. To the left of the front is the remaining wall of the coach house and stable. This is in red brick on a plinth, and contains seven round arches and an impost band. The middle arch contains a doorway, and the other arches are blind.	I
20 and 22 Market Place; 53.01835°N 1.73230°W	—	Late 17th to early 18th century	The oldest parts of the building are at the rear, with the stuccoed front dating from the 18th century. The roof is tiled, and there are three storeys and six bays. On the front is a doorcase with a moulded hood on slender fluted pillars, and the door has a fanlight and moulded consoles. To the left is a 19th-century shop front, and an arched passage entry, and the windows are sashes. The rear is in red brick with a three-storey centre, and two-storey wings, and the windows have two lights with Gothic tracery.	II*
24 and 26 Church Street; 53.01654°N 1.73442°W		c. 1700–10	A house to which a shop was added in 1930. It is roughcast, with quoins, moulded plaster eaves, and a tile roof with stone gables and kneelers. There are two storeys and four bays. Flanking the middle two bays are giant fluted pilasters with Ionic caps. The right pilaster passes through the shop front, and the central doorway has pilasters and a cornice. The windows are sashes with moulded architraves and cornices.	II
32 Market Place and 2 King Street; 53.01859°N 1.73276°W	—	1712	A shop and houses in red brick on a plinth, with bands, and a tile roof. There are two storeys, basements and attics, three bays on Market Place, and two on King Street. On the front is a 19th-century shop front with pilasters, an architrave, an entablature, and a cornice, and at the right end is a doorway approached by steps that has a dated lintel. The upper floor contains sash windows, and in the attic are three gabled dormers with casements. On the King Street front is a doorway that has pilasters with lozenge motifs, an entablature, and a decorative cornice.	II
Spalden's Almshouses; 53.01482°N 1.73774°W		1723–24	The almshouses are in red brick with stone dressings, plain eaves, and a hipped tile roof. There are two storeys and three ranges around a courtyard, and at the rear is a single-storey extension. The doorways have surrounds with plinths and pseudo-quoins, and the windows are mullioned with two lights. Above the ground floor is a moulded cornice that steps up over the doorways, where it contains mutules.	II
9 and 11 Church Street; 53.01688°N 1.73418°W	—	Early 18th century	A row of three shops in chequered brick, with floor bands, brick eaves, and a tile roof. There are three storeys and seven bays. In the ground floor, from the left, is a passage entry, a modern shop front, a doorway with a weather hood and two windows and, on the right, a double shop front dating from the 19th century with pilasters, an architrave, an entablature, and a cornice. The upper floors contain sash windows with wedge lintels and keystones.	II
28 Church Street; 53.01644°N 1.73470°W		Early 18th century	A pair of shops in red brick with a panelled parapet. There are three storeys and seven bays. In the centre of the ground floor is a doorway with a shell hood on modillion brackets, and this is flanked by modern shop fronts. The upper floors contain sash windows with wedge lintels and keystones.	II
51 Church Street; 53.01603°N 1.73661°W	—	Early 18th century	A roughcast house whose front was later altered, it has a dentilled plaster cornice under the attic, and a coped tile roof. There are two storeys and an attic, and a symmetrical front of three bays. Steps with railings lead up to the central doorway that has a moulded surround, and a pediment on consoles. The windows are sashes with moulded hood moulds and louvred shutters, and in the attic are two small gables with fretted bargeboards.	II
53–57 Church Street; 53.01599°N 1.73675°W		Early 18th century	A group of houses that have been altered, and at one time were part of a public house. They are in chequered brick with bands, and a tile roof. There are two storeys and attics, and three bays. In the ground floor are three doorways with moulded surrounds and cornices on consoles, and to the left is a passage entry. The windows are sashes with moulded surrounds, and in the attic are three gabled dormers with moulded bargeboards.	II
4 King Street; 53.01872°N 1.73268°W	—	Early 18th century	A house in a terrace, at one time a shop, in red brick with two storeys and attics, and two bays. In the centre is a doorway, to its left is a shop window with a cornice, and to its right a square window. The middle floor contains casement windows with segmental heads, and in the attic are two gabled dormers.	II
12 Market Place; 53.01808°N 1.73190°W	—	Early 18th century	A shop in red brick, with quoins, a floor band, and a tile roof with a gable on the right. There are three storeys and four bays. In the ground floor is a 19th-century shop front with pilasters, and a bracketed cornice, partly dentilled. To the left is a passage entry with a pediment. The upper floors contain sash windows with small keystones, and in the centre are two moulded square panels containing ovals.	II
14 Market Place; 53.01814°N 1.73199°W	—	Early 18th century	A shop in red brick with two bays, and a shop front in the ground floor. The left bay has four storeys and a slate roof, the right bay has three storeys and a tile roof, and between them is stone coping and a stone bracket. The windows are sashes, most with lintels and keystones, and in the right bay is a dormer.	II
14 Victoria Square; 53.01749°N 1.73281°W	—	Early 18th century	The building has a stuccoed front and a slate roof, two storeys and attics. In the ground floor is a modern shop window and a modern shop front. The upper floor contains sash windows, and above are gabled dormers with fretted and curved bargeboards.	II
Dove House; 53.01796°N 1.73502°W	—	Early 18th century	A house in chequered brick with stone dressings, quoins, coved stone eaves and a tile roof. There are two storeys, five bays, and a single-storey single-bay right wing. Semicircular steps lead up to the central stuccoed doorway that has pilasters, an architrave, and a rectangular fanlight with Gothic glazing. The windows are sashes with moulded architraves and keystones, and in the wing is a canted bay window.	II*
The Horns Public House; 53.01745°N 1.73286°W		Early 18th century	The public house is stuccoed, and has two storeys and attics, and three bays, the right bay angled and lower. In the ground floor is a pub front with canted bay windows, and there is a bay window in the upper floor of the right bay. The attics contain gabled dormers with fretted and curved bargeboards.	II
Churchyard gates and gate piers, St Oswald's Church; 53.01546°N 1.73805°W		c. 1730	At the entrance to the churchyard are two pairs of gate piers, the inner pair larger and taller. They are in stone, square and panelled, and surmounted by tall panelled tapering tops resting on a skull at each corner, and surmounted by a flaming urn. Between them are iron gates.	II*
Gazebo, Dove House; 53.01831°N 1.73486°W	—	Early to mid 18th century	The gazebo in the garden of the house is in red brick with a tile roof. There are two storeys, in the ground floor is an arch, and the upper floor contains a sash window.	II
1 Buxton Road; 53.01880°N 1.73286°W	—	18th century	A house on a corner site in red brick with quoins and a hipped slate roof. There are three storeys and one bay. In the ground floor is a shop window and a doorway, both with an architrave, pilasters, an entablature, and a cornice. The middle floor contains a casement window, and the top floor a sash window.	II
2 Buxton Road; 53.01879°N 1.73313°W	—	18th century	A red brick shop with a hipped tile roof, three storeys and two bays. In the ground floor is a 19th-century shop front with an architrave, an entablature, and a dentilled cornice. The upper floors contain sash windows with cambered heads.	II
3 Buxton Road; 53.01885°N 1.73286°W	—	18th century	A red brick house in a terrace, with a slate roof, three storeys and one bay. In the ground floor is a doorway with a reeded architrave and medallions, and a casement window. The upper floors contain sash windows.	II
5 Buxton Road; 53.01889°N 1.73286°W	—	18th century	A red brick house in a terrace, with a slate roof, three storeys and one bay. In the ground floor is a doorway with a reeded architrave and medallions, and a two-light window. The middle floor contains a sash window and in the top is a casement window.	II
7 and 9 Buxton Road; 53.01894°N 1.73287°W	—	18th century	A pair of mirror-image houses in a terrace in red brick with a slate roof. There are three storeys, and each house has one bay. In the ground floor of each house is a doorway with a reeded architrave and medallions, and the windows are sashes.	II
11 Buxton Road; 53.01898°N 1.73288°W	—	18th century	A red brick house in a terrace, with a slate roof, three storeys and one bay. The doorway and the windows, which are sashes, have wedge lintels.	II
12 and 14 Buxton Road; 53.01913°N 1.73323°W	—	18th century	A pair of red brick houses with an eaves cornice and a tile roof. There are two storeys, a basement on the left, and five bays. In the basement are a doorway and a window with segmental heads. On the front, steps lead up to two doorways. The left doorway has steps with rails, and a shallow cornice hood on slender pillars, and the right doorway has a pediment. The windows are sashes.	II
Building behind 12 and 14 Buxton Road; 53.01911°N 1.73338°W	—	18th century	The building at the rear of Buxton Road is in red brick and has a coped gable. There are two storeys, and two bays. In each bay is a doorway, and the windows are casements, those in the upper floor with segmental heads.	II
13 and 15 Buxton Road; 53.01904°N 1.73293°W	—	18th century	A pair of mirror-image houses in a terrace in red brick with a slate roof. There are three storeys, and each house has one bay. The doorways have cambered heads, and the windows are sashes with wedge lintels tooled as voussoirs and keystones.	II
18–22 Buxton Road; 53.01955°N 1.73343°W		18th century	A terrace of three red brick cottages with a double span tile roof. There are two storeys, and each cottage has one bay. The doorways are recessed and have panelled pilasters, an architrave, and an entablature with Greek key motifs. No. 18 has a square bay window, and the other windows are sashes.	II
24 and 26 Buxton Road; 53.01961°N 1.73347°W	—	18th century	A pair of two red brick cottages in a terrace with a tile roof. There are two storeys, and each cottage has one bay. The doorways have panelled pilasters and small flat hoods, and the windows are sashes.	II
3 and 5 Church Street; 53.01699°N 1.73379°W	—	18th century	A pair of red brick shops with a tile roof and three storeys. No. 3 has two bays, and No. 5, to the left, is slightly recessed, and has one bay. No. 3 has a modern shop front, and the shop front of No. 5 dates from the mid to late 19th century, and has panelled pilasters. Between the shop fronts is a passage entry, and the upper floors contain sash windows, most with wedge lintels and keystones.	II
Summer house, 7 Church Street; 53.01726°N 1.73455°W	—	18th century	The summer house is set into a brick wall at the rear of the garden, and is approached by a path with steps. It consists of a moulded stone alcove flanked by plain piers with imposts, and rusticated pilasters.	II
12 and 14 Church Street; 53.01669°N 1.73404°W	—	18th century	A pair of stuccoed shops with an eaves cornice and a tile roof. There are three storeys and four bays. In the ground floor is a carriageway arch, to the left is a 19th-century shop front with a bay window, a recessed doorway, and a decorative frieze and pilasters, and to the right is a smaller, later shop front. The upper floors contain sash windows with lintels grooved as voussoirs and keystones.	II
17 and 19 Church Street; 53.01668°N 1.73466°W	—	18th century	A pair of roughcast shops with a tile roof, two storeys and one bay each. In the ground floor are 19th-century shop fronts, No. 17 with a dentilled cornice and panelled pilasters, and No. 19 with fluted pilasters and a bay window. The upper floor contains sash windows.	II
21 and 23 Church Street; 53.01663°N 1.73477°W	—	18th century	A pair of shops in red brick with a tile roof, three storeys and three bays. In the ground floor is a carriage entrance with an elliptical arch, and to its right are 19th-century shop fronts. No. 21 has a bay window and fluted pilasters, and No. 23 has a double shop front with a dentilled cornice and pilasters. The upper floors contain sash windows with wedge lintels.	II
25 Church Street; 53.01658°N 1.73492°W	—	18th century	A roughcast house on a stuccoed plinth with a tile roof. There are three storeys and two bays. The central doorway has a semicircular moulded architrave, with impost blocks and a keystone. The windows are sashes with moulded frames.	II
33–37 Church Street; 53.01641°N 1.73547°W	—	18th century	Two shops in red brick with tile roofs, three storeys, sash windows, and 19th-century shop fronts. No. 33–35 on the right has three bays, and the windows have wedge lintels grooved as voussoirs and keystones. No. 37 is lower and has an eaves cornice, two storeys, and a passage entry on the left. The windows have plain lintels.	II
38 Church Street; 53.01601°N 1.73599°W	—	18th century	A shop in red brick with a wooden modillion eaves cornice and a tile roof. There are two storeys and three bays. In the ground floor are a doorway and two shop windows, and the upper floor contains sash windows. The doorway and windows have wedge lintels grooved as voussoirs and keystones.	II
45 and 47 Church Street; 53.01615°N 1.73628°W	—	18th century	A pair of small shops in red brick, with a tile roof and two storeys, and each shop has one bay. No. 47 on the left has a 19th-century shop front with pilasters and a cornice on consoles. The shop front of No. 45 is earlier, and steps lead up to a doorway with fluted pilasters and a cornice, and to the right is a shop window.	II
Garden wall, 72 Church Street; 53.01546°N 1.73779°W	—	18th century	The garden wall is in red brick, and partly coped in stone. It is curved, and encloses the garden to the west of the house on Church Street and School Lane.	II
11 Dig Street; 53.01661°N 1.73326°W	—	18th century	A house in painted red brick with an eaves cornice and a tile roof. It has two and three storeys, and three bays. The doorway has pilasters, an entablature and a cornice, and the windows are a mix of sashes and casements. At the northwest end are external stone steps.	II
15 and 17 Dig Street; 53.01669°N 1.73304°W	—	18th century	A pair of shops in red brick with a dentilled eaves cornice and three storeys. No 15 has three bays, and a rear wing with two storeys and two bays. In the ground floor is a shop front, and the upper floors contain sash windows with cambered heads. No. 17 to the left dates from the 19th century, and has one bay, and a gable with wavy bargeboards and a finial. In the ground floor is a shop front on a plinth with a moulded cornice, the middle floor contains a canted oriel window, and in the top floor is a sash window.	II
49 and 51 Green Lane; 53.02173°N 1.72599°W	—	18th century	A pair of houses, the left in red brick, the right roughcast, with a hipped slate roof. There are two storeys and each house has two bays. The doorways have pilasters and cornices, and the windows are sashes with plain lintels and keystones.	II
1 Lovatt's Yard; 53.01842°N 1.73213°W	—	18th century	A house in red brick with sill bands and a tile roof. There are three storeys and four bays, and a later three-storey two-bay extension on the left. The main doorway has a moulded architrave. Most of the windows are sashes, and in the centre of the top floor is a square window with cobweb glazing.	II
3 Market Place; 53.01792°N 1.73213°W	—	18th century	A shop in red brick, the ground floor painted, with a tile roof. There are three storeys and three bays. In the ground floor is a modern shop front flanked by bow windows, and the upper floors contain sash windows.	II
5 Market Place; 53.01800°N 1.73225°W		18th century	A rendered shop with a hipped slate roof. There are three storeys, and each front has two bays. The ground floor contains a modern shop front, in the right return is a doorway with a pediment, and the windows are sashes.	II
35 Market Place; 53.01803°N 1.73303°W	—	18th century	A red brick shop with an eaves cornice and a tile roof. There are three storeys and one bay. In the ground floor is a 19th-century shop window and a round-arched doorway to its right. The upper floors contain sash windows, each with a decorative stuccoed pediment on brackets.	II
37, 39 and 41 Market Place; 53.01816°N 1.73302°W	—	18th century	A pair of shops in red brick with an eaves cornice and a tile roof. There are three storeys, and each shop has three bays. The right shop front dates from the 19th-century, and has steps with railings leading up to a central doorway, and the left shop front is modern. In the upper floor are sash windows with wedge lintels.	II
2 St John's Street and 2 Dig Street; 53.01700°N 1.73337°W	—	18th century	A building on a corner site, at one time a bank, it is in red brick with an eaves cornice and a tile roof. There are three storeys, two bays on St John's Street, two on Dig Street, and a curved bay on the corner. In the ground floor is modern front, and the upper floors contain sash windows with wedge lintels.	II
8 St John's Street; 53.01711°N 1.73311°W	—	18th century	The building, at one time a bank, is in red brick on a plinth, with a moulded eaves cornice and a tile roof. There are three storeys and three bays. In the ground floor is a modern bank front, and the upper floors contain sash windows with wedge lintels.	II
13 St John's Street; 53.01740°N 1.73268°W	—	18th century	The building is in painted brick, and has five bays, the left two bays projecting. The left two bays have three storeys and an attic, and in the ground floor is a shop window. The other bays have three storeys and a dentilled cornice. In the ground floor is a shop front, and to its left is a doorway with a segmental head. The windows in both parts are sashes.	II
22 St John's Street; 53.01742°N 1.73225°W	—	18th century	A rendered shop with a double-span tile roof and gables at the sides. There are three storeys and two bays. In the ground floor is a modern shop front, and the upper floors contain sash windows with segmental-arched heads.	II
25 and 25A St John's Street; 53.01777°N 1.73215°W	—	18th century and earlier	A pair of roughcast shops on a corner site, with a tile roof. There are three storeys, and three bays, the right bay lower. The ground floor contains modern shop fronts, and in the upper floors the windows in the left two bays are sash windows, and in the right bay they are modern replacements.	II
29 St John's Street; 53.01794°N 1.73139°W	—	18th century	A pair of stuccoed shops with a tile roof. There are three storeys and two bays, the right bay lower. The ground floor contains two shop fronts, one dating from the 19th century, and the other modern. In the upper floors are small-pane windows, that in the upper floor of the right bay in a gabled dormer.	II
37–39 St John's Street; 53.01808°N 1.73105°W	—	18th century	A house in red brick on a plinth with a tile roof. There are three storeys, and an L-shaped plan, with a front of two bays, and a long rear range. Semicircular steps lead up to the central doorway that has fluted jambs. The windows are sashes; they and the doorway have lintels with voussoirs and keystones. To the left of the doorway is a canted bay window. Inside the first floor of the house is a room with oil painting on plaster surviving from the 19th century.	II*
38 and 40 St John's Street; 53.01767°N 1.73172°W	—	18th century	A shop in red brick with a tile roof. There are three storeys and six bays. In the ground floor is a modern shop front, and the upper floors contain sash windows with wedge lintels.	II
42 and 44 St John's Street; 53.01773°N 1.73146°W	—	18th century	A house, later shops, in red brick, with a modillion eaves cornice and a tile roof. There are three storeys and seven bays. In the ground floor are modern shop fronts. The central bay in the middle floor contains a Venetian window, and in the top floor is a Diocletian window. The other windows are sashes with wedge lintels and keystones.	II
24 Union Street; 53.01771°N 1.73458°W	—	Mid 18th century	A town house in red brick with dentilled eaves and a roof of Staffordshire blue tile. There are three storeys and three bays, the middle bay slightly projecting, and a projecting stair tower with a hipped roof at the rear. In the centre bay, steps with railings lead up to a doorway with a segmental arch, and above are sash windows, that in the middle floor with wedge lintel and a keystone. The doorway is flanked by sash windows with segmental heads and shutters.	II
1 and 2 Victoria Square; 53.01737°N 1.73326°W		18th century	A pair of shops in red brick, the front of No. 1 stuccoed, with an eaves cornice, and a tile roof. There are three storeys, and each shop has two bays. In the ground floor are modern shop fronts. The middle floor of No. 1 contains a canted bay window, and the other windows are sashes.	II
16 Victoria Square; 53.01737°N 1.73299°W	—	18th century	A shop with a rendered front and possible internal timber framing, an eaves cornice, and a tile roof. There are three storeys and two wide bays. In the ground floor is a shop front and a signboard from the late 18th or early 19th century. The upper floors contain sash windows with moulded architraves.	II
Clergyman's Widows' Almshouses; 53.01658°N 1.73416°W		Mid 18th century	The almshouses are in red brick, with stone dressings, a corbelled stone cornice, and a parapet. There are three storeys, and a U-shaped plan, consisting of a main range of three bays, and projecting two-bay wings. In each range is a doorway with a moulded pediment on consoles, and the windows are sashes in moulded architraves.	II
Garden wall, Dove House; 53.01775°N 1.73511°W	—	18th century	The garden wall is in red brick and is curved, running along Union Street and Dovehouse Green.	II
Gate Farmhouse; 53.01338°N 1.71283°W	—	18th century	The farmhouse is in red brick, with two storeys and two bays, and single-storey outshuts to the east and the west. In the centre is a doorway with pilasters and a simple hood, and the windows are casements with cambered heads.	II
Garden wall, Lloyds Bank; 53.01610°N 1.73285°W	—	18th century	The wall is in red brick, and it encloses the garden to the rear of the bank on the south and north sides, forming a boundary between the garden and Henmore Brook. The southern part is ramped and contains a doorway with a segmental arch.	II
Summer house, Mansion House; 53.01551°N 1.73661°W	—	Mid 18th century	The summer house in the grounds of the house is in brick with a freestone façade, and is in Roman Doric style. It is in the form of a miniature temple, with three open arched bays divided by pilasters with moulded caps carrying a dentilled pediment.	II*
Garden wall, piers and gates, Spalden's Almshouses; 53.01465°N 1.73745°W	—	18th century	The wall running along the east side of the garden is in red brick with stone coping. The gate piers are in red brick or stone with stone caps, and the gates are in iron.	II
The Greenman and sign 53.01716°N 1.73298°W		Mid 18th century	The hotel and public house, former the Green Man and Black Head's Hotel, is in red brick on a plinth, with a tile roof. There are three storeys and seven bays. In the centre is an arched entrance to the courtyard. The windows are sashes with wedge lintels, and at the rear is a bay window with a moulded surround. From the centre of the front of the building, an inn sign in iron and wood bridges the road.	II*
Ye Olde Vaults; 53.01774°N 1.73298°W		18th century	The public house is stuccoed, and has an eaves cornice and a tile roof. There are three storeys and two bays. The central doorway has a moulded architrave and a cornice, and the windows are sashes in moulded architraves. On the eastern front is a wooden gallery.	II
The Grey House; 53.01590°N 1.73712°W		c. 1763–65	A large house in freestone with a corbelled cornice and a parapet with inset balustrades. There are three storeys and cellars, and three bays. The outer bays contain three-storey angular bay windows. In the centre, steps on three sides lead up to a portico with Roman Doric columns, a cornice, and a dentilled pediment. The doorway has pilasters, a semicircular fanlight and side lights. Above, in the middle floor, is a Venetian window, and the top floor contains a Diocletian window, over which is a dentilled pediment.	II*
59 Church Street; 53.01594°N 1.73693°W		Mid to late 18th century	A house, probably originally stables that have been altered, in red brick on a stone plinth, with corbelled plaster eaves and a slate roof. There are two storeys and three bays, each bay containing a full-height round-headed arch. The middle bay contains a recessed entrance, and elsewhere are casement windows.	II
54 St John's Street; 53.01800°N 1.73082°W	—	Mid to late 18th century	A house in red brick with a stuccoed plinth and cornice, a blocking course, and a tile roof. There are three storeys and five bays, the middle projecting slightly. In the centre is a stuccoed doorway with four Tuscan pilasters, side lights, and a moulded pediment. The windows are sashes with gauged flat brick arches and keystones.	II
Lloyds Bank; 53.01602°N 1.73226°W		Late 1760s	A house, later a bank, in stone, with sill bands, and at the top a corbelled cornice and a blocking course. The main block has three storeys and three bays, a two-storey two-bay wing to the left, and a lower three-storey one-bay wing on the right. In the centre is a doorway with a moulded surround, rusticated pilasters, and an open pediment on consoles. Flanking it are Venetian windows, and the other windows are sashes, the three windows in the middle floor of the main block with moulded architraves, set in round-arched recesses.	II
34 Church Street; 53.01628°N 1.73520°W	—	Late 18th century	The house, which was refronted in about 1835, is in red brick, and has a moulded plaster cornice and a parapet. There are three storeys and three bays. The stuccoed central doorway has Roman Doric columns, a frieze with triglyphs, and a dentilled pediment. To the left is a smaller round-arched doorway with an archivolt and impost blocks. The windows are sashes with engraved lintels and moulded keystones.	II
49 Church Street; 53.01610°N 1.73643°W	—	Late 18th century	A red brick house with a sill band in the ground floor, a moulded stone cornice between the two top floors and a coped parapet. There are three storeys and a stone-faced basement, and a symmetrical front of five bays. Steps with railings lead up to the central stuccoed doorway that has a moulded architrave, and a pediment on consoles. In the basement are windows with arched heads, and the other windows are sashes.	II
16 St John's Street; 53.01731°N 1.73254°W	—	Late 18th century	The building is stuccoed with a moulded eaves cornice and a slate roof. There are three storeys and four bays. In the ground floor are shop fronts, and to their left is a round-arched doorway with moulded pilasters, an archivolt, and a fanlight with cobweb tracery. The upper floors contain sash windows.	II
18 and 20 St John's Street; 53.01737°N 1.73241°W	—	Late 18th century	A stuccoed shop with moulded plaster eaves and a tile roof. There are three storeys and three bays. In the ground floor is a modern shop front, and the upper floors contain sash windows.	II
45 St John's Street; 53.01826°N 1.73073°W	—	Late 18th century	A red brick house with coved stuccoed eaves and a tile roof. There are three storeys and three bays. The central doorway has a moulded surround, a rectangular fanlight with Gothic tracery, and a pediment. The outer bays contain two-storey canted bay windows, and the other windows are sashes with keystones. To the left is a passage doorway.	II
47 and 49 John's Street; 53.01833°N 1.73056°W	—	Late 18th century	A pair of red brick houses with a coped tile roof. There are three storeys and five bays. The central doorway has pilasters and a bracketed flat hood, and to its right is a canted bay window. The windows are sashes with engraved lintels and keystones, and at the extreme left is a passage doorway.	II
51 John's Street; 53.01841°N 1.73039°W	—	Late 18th century	A stuccoed house on a plinth, with a top floor sill band, bracketed eaves, and a tile roof. There are three storeys and four bays. In the second bay, steps with railings lead up to a doorway that has a moulded pediment, and the windows are sashes.	II
56 St John's Street; 53.01806°N 1.73068°W	—	Late 18th century	A roughcast house with a coped parapet. There are three storeys and three bays. Steps lead up to the doorway in the left bay that has a rectangular fanlight with Gothic tracery. The windows are sashes.	II
Former malthouse 53.01690°N 1.73513°W	—	Late 18th century	The former malthouse behind No. 23 Church Street is in stone in the lower parts, with brick above and a tile roof. There are three storeys and a part-basement. In the ground floor are two round-headed arches, one blocked, and a doorway with a cambered head, and the other openings include windows, a taking-in area, and a taking-in door.	II
Hulland House; 53.01599°N 1.73613°W	—	Late 18th century	A red brick house with moulded eaves and a blocking course. There are three storeys and four bays, the right bay recessed. The doorway has a stuccoed architrave and a moulded curved pediment. To its right is an elliptical-headed carriage entrance with imposts and a keystone. The windows are sashes with engraved lintels and moulded keystones, those in the ground floor with cast iron guards on stone plinths.	II
Summer house, Belle Vue Road; 53.01659°N 1.73700°W	—	Late 18th century	The summer house is in brick and stone, and has a tile roof. It consists of an arched apsidal alcove with pilasters and moulded stone cornices, and above it is a brick band and a parapet. The apse has corbelled and dog-toothed eaves.	II
Vine House; 53.01673°N 1.73448°W		Late 18th century	The house is in red brick, with bands, moulded eaves, and a tile roof with gables and kneelers. There are three storeys and a basement, and five bays. On the front is a stuccoed porch with Roman Doric columns and a cornice. The windows are sashes with wedge lintels and keystones, and in the basement is a mullioned window.	II
13 Dig Street; 53.01675°N 1.73322°W	—	c. 1800	A house and a shop on a corner site, in stuccoed brick, with a dentilled cornice and a tile roof. There are three storeys and two bays. On the corner is a 19th-century shop front with panelled pilasters and recessed doorway. To its left is a sash window and a wide doorway, the upper floors contain sash windows with moulded surrounds and cambered heads, and at the rear are two-light casement windows.	II
Cooper's Almshouses; 53.01388°N 1.73134°W	—	1800	A row of six almshouses in two ranges, they are in red brick with an eaves cornice and a slate roof. There is one storey, and each house has two bays, a doorway with a fanlight, and a casement window. All the openings have round-arched heads, and between the ranges is a passageway over which is an inscribed plaque.	II
Royal British Legion Headquarters; 53.01795°N 1.73249°W	—	c. 1800	The building is roughcast and has a tile roof, four storeys and four bays. The doorway has a moulded surround. There is a gabled wing at right angles with three storeys, three bays, and coved plaster eaves. The windows in both parts are sashes.	II
4 Dig Street; 53.01693°N 1.73330°W	—	Late 18th to early 19th century	The building, at one time part of a bank, is in red brick with a tile roof. There are three storeys and one bay. In the ground floor is an inserted shop window, and the upper floors contain sash windows with wedge lintels.	II
6 Dig Street; 53.01690°N 1.73321°W	—	Late 18th to early 19th century	A shop in red brick with four storeys and two bays. In the ground floor is a modern shop front, and the upper floors contain sash windows with wedge lintels.	II
8 Dig Street; 53.01688°N 1.73315°W	—	Late 18th to early 19th century	A shop in red brick with a tile roof. There are three storeys and two bays. In the ground floor is a modern shop front, and the upper floors contain sash windows with wedge lintels.	II
10 Dig Street; 53.01685°N 1.73308°W	—	Late 18th to early 19th century	A shop in red brick with a tile roof. There are three storeys and three bays. In the ground floor is an early 20th-century shop front, and an entry to the right. The upper floors contain sash windows with wedge lintels.	II
12 Dig Street; 53.01681°N 1.73298°W		Late 18th to early 19th century	A shop in red brick with a slate roof. There are three storeys and three bays. In the ground floor is an early 20th-century shop front, and an entry to the right. The upper floors contain sash windows with lintels.	II
14 Dig Street; 53.01678°N 1.73291°W		Late 18th to early 19th century	A shop in red brick with three storeys and two bays. In the ground floor is a modern shop front, and the upper floors contain sash windows with wedge lintels tooled to resemble voussoirs and keystones.	II
Boundary wall, Lovatt's Yard; 53.01850°N 1.73226°W	—	Late 18th to early 19th century	The wall is in red brick, and it forms the boundary on the northwestern and the northeastern sides of the yard.	II
11 and 11A Market Place; 53.01793°N 1.73268°W	—	Late 18th to early 19th century	A shop and a house, later a club, it is roughcast and has a tile roof. There are three storeys and two bays. In the ground floor is a 19th-century shop front, and the upper floors contain sash windows.	II
Surface of Market Place; 53.01805°N 1.73278°W	—	Late 18th to early 19th century (or earlier)	The surface of Market Place and the flanking raised pavements to the west and northeast are paved mainly with limestone setts and some flagstones.	II
14 St John's Street; 53.01725°N 1.73269°W	—	Late 18th to early 19th century	A red brick shop with an eaves cornice and a tile roof. There are three storeys and two bays. In the ground floor is a shop front, and the upper floors contain sash windows with margin lights.	II
52 St John's Street; 53.01789°N 1.73108°W	—	Late 18th to early 19th century	The building is in red brick on a plinth, with a coped parapet, and a hipped tile roof. There are three storeys and three bays. In the ground floor are two recessed doorways and a passage entry, and the windows are sashes with wedge lintels.	II
House adjoining 52 St John's Street; 53.01794°N 1.73096°W	—	Late 18th to early 19th century	The house is in red brick with a stuccoed plinth, a sill band and a parapet. There are two storeys and three bays. In the centre of the ground floor is a round-headed doorway with imposts, to its right is an elliptical-headed carriage entrance, and the windows are sashes with wedge lintels.	II
7, 9, 11 and 15 Sturston Road; 53.01415°N 1.73018°W	—	Late 18th to early 19th century	A terrace of cottages in rendered brick with a roof of Staffordshire blue tile. There are two storeys, a double-depth plan, and each cottage has two bays. No. 7 has cross windows, and in the other cottages the windows are sashes.	II
13 Sturston Road; 53.01415°N 1.73007°W	—	Late 18th to early 19th century	The right-hand house of a pair in a terrace, it is roughcast with a tile roof. There are two storeys and one bay. It contains a doorway, and a modern casement window in each floor. Above the doorway is an inscribed plaque stating that the house is the birthplace of Catherine Mumford, who married William Booth, and was the co-founder of The Salvation Army.	II
10 Victoria Square; 53.01757°N 1.73297°W	—	Late 18th to early 19th century	A shop in red brick with a bracketed eaves cornice and a tile roof. There are three storeys and two bays. In the ground floor is a doorway with a shouldered architrave and a pediment, and a modern shop front. The upper floors contain sash windows, and in the middle of the top floor is a sundial.	II
Surface of Victoria Square; 53.01744°N 1.73311°W	—	Late 18th to early 19th century (or earlier)	Victoria Square is paved with limestone setts and flagstones, and a narrow modern surfaced footway passes through the centre.	II
Smith's Tavern; 53.01762°N 1.73182°W		Late 18th to early 19th century	The public house is in red brick with an eaves cornice and a tile roof. There are three storeys and an attic, and two bays. In the ground floor is an original shop front, with barred square bay windows on carved wooden brackets, and double doors in the centre. The upper floors contain sash windows with wedge lintels, and to the left is a doorway with an architrave.	II*
The Corner House; 53.01684°N 1.73371°W		Late 18th to early 19th century	A shop on a corner site, it is roughcast, and has an eaves cornice and a hipped roof. There are three storeys, five bays on Church Street, and one on Dig Street. In the ground floor is a modern shop front, and the upper floors contain sash windows.	II
W. H. Smith; 53.01706°N 1.73325°W	—	Late 18th to early 19th century	A shop in red brick that has brick eaves with projecting headers and a tile roof. There are three storeys and three bays. In the ground floor is a modern shop front, and the upper floors contain sash windows with panelled lintels and keystones.	II
Former Congregational Chapel; 53.01376°N 1.73113°W		1801	The chapel is in red brick with sandstone dressings and a Welsh slate roof. The front has a pediment with a coped gable and an oculus in the tympanum, flanking pilasters, a sill band, and an impost band. In the centre is an open porch with round arches on three sides, moulded keystones and a balustraded balcony. The windows are tall and round-headed and set in recessed arches.	II
17 Buxton Road; 53.01909°N 1.73298°W	—	Early 19th century	A red brick house in a terrace, with a tile roof, three storeys and one bay. The doorway has panelled pilasters, an architrave, and a cornice on brackets. The windows are sashes with wedge lintels tooled as voussoirs and keystones.	II
19 Buxton Road; 53.01911°N 1.73297°W	—	Early 19th century	A red brick house at the end of a terrace, with a tile roof, three storeys and two bays. The doorway has panelled pilasters, an architrave, and a large hood on brackets. The windows are sashes with wedge lintels tooled as voussoirs and keystones.	II
13 Church Street; 53.01680°N 1.73437°W		Early 19th century	A house in red brick with moulded plaster eaves and a tile roof. There are three storeys and three bays. Steps with railings lead up to the doorway in the left bay that has a stuccoed round-arched head with a moulded archivolt. The windows are sashes with moulded lintels and keystones.	II
27 Church Street; 53.01655°N 1.73504°W	—	Early 19th century	A roughcast house, later used for other purposes, on a stucco plinth, with moulded plaster eaves. There are three storeys and three bays. Steps with railings lead up to the doorway in the right bay that has a stuccoed round-arched head. The windows are sashes, those in the ground floor with curved pediments, and in the middle floor with triangular pediments on pilaster brackets. On the middle floor is a cast iron balcony.	II
29 Church Street; 53.01651°N 1.73515°W	—	Early 19th century	A stuccoed shop with a dentilled eaves cornice and a tile roof. There are three storeys and two bays. In the ground floor is a 19th-century shop front, and to its right is a passage entry with an entablature, panelled pilasters, and a dentilled cornice. The upper floors contain sash windows, those in the middle floor with triangular pediments on pilaster brackets.	II
2 Lovatt's Yard; 53.01851°N 1.73201°W	—	Early 19th century	A cottage in red brick with a tile roof, two storeys and three bays. The central doorway has pilasters and a small bracketed hood, and the windows are sliding casements with elliptical heads.	II
3 and 4 Lovatt's Yard; 53.01858°N 1.73191°W	—	Early 19th century	A pair of red brick cottages with tile roofs. Each cottage has two storeys and three bays. The central doorways have pilasters and small bracketed hoods. The windows have slightly pointed heads and contain Gothic glazing.	II
2–6 Market Place; 53.01788°N 1.73166°W		Early 19th century	A row of three stuccoed shops on a corner site, with quoins and a tile roof. There are three storeys and each shop has two bays. In the ground floor are remaining parts of 19th-century shop fronts. Nos. 2 and 6 have dentilled cornices, and No. 2 has iron arched heads to the windows and doorway, and decorative spandrels. In the right return is a small shop front with pilasters, an entablature, and an architrave with a cornice. The upper floors contain sash windows with moulded architraves.	II
13 Market Place; 53.01793°N 1.73264°W	—	Early 19th century	A shop in red brick with moulded stone eaves, three storeys and two bays. In the ground floor is an original shop front with bay windows. The upper floors contain sash windows with engraved lintels and moulded keystones.	II
24 Market Place; 53.01843°N 1.73244°W	—	Early 19th century	A shop in red brick on a stone plinth, with a bracketed stone eaves cornice. There are three storeys and five bays. In the ground floor is a late 19th-century shop front with a dentilled cornice, an architrave, and pedimented pilasters. The windows in the upper floors are sashes, the centre windows with moulded architraves, and the window in the middle floor also with a bracketed ledge above.	II
31 and 33 Market Place; 53.01796°N 1.73305°W	—	Early 19th century	A pair of shops in red brick with a tile roof, three storeys and four bays. In the ground floor are two shop fronts, between which is a round-arched passage entrance with a stuccoed moulded surround, brackets, and a keystone. Above each shop front, in the middle floor, is a canted bay window, and the other windows are sashes.	II
34 St John's Street; 53.01756°N 1.73190°W	—	Early 19th century	A shop in painted brick with an eaves cornice. There are three storeys and three bays. In the centre of the ground floor is a round-arched entrance with a moulded surround, a fanlight, and a keystone. To its right is a 19th-century shop window with engaged pillars, and to the left is a shop front. The upper floors contain sash windows.	II
50 St John's Street; 53.01779°N 1.73116°W	—	Early 19th century	A shop and office in red brick on a plinth, with stone dressings, and an eaves cornice. There are two storeys and three bays. In the ground floor is a 19th-century shop front and doorway with pilasters and a projecting cornice, and to the right is a smaller round-headed doorway. The windows are round-headed with a moulded arch and impost blocks.	II.
16 and 18 Sturston Road; 53.01427°N 1.73096°W		Early 19th century	A pair of red brick houses on a plinth, with a tile roof, three storeys and three bays. In the middle bay is a doorway with a segmental head. To the right are a shop window and a doorway, each with an entablature, a ledged cornice, an architrave, panelled pilasters, and curved brackets as end stops. The windows are sashes, those in the middle floor with wedge lintels.	II.
3 Union Street; 53.01845°N 1.73344°W	—	Early 19th century	A house in a terrace, in red brick, with an eaves cornice, three storeys and two bays. In the ground floor, steps lead up to a doorway, to its left is a carriage entrance with double doors, and the upper floors contain sash windows. The doorway and windows have engraved lintels and keystones.	II
5 Victoria Square; 53.01765°N 1.73318°W	—	Early 19th century	A shop with a stuccoed front on an earlier timber framed core. There are two storeys and two bays. In the ground floor is a modern shop front, and internally there is exposed timber framing.	II
Building behind 24 Derby Road; 53.01378°N 1.72982°W	—	Early 19th century	The building is in red brick with a hipped slate roof, and is in two and three storeys. It is said to have been prison quarters for French officers captured in the Napoleonic Wars, and cells remain in the interior.	II
Pump, Belle Vue Road; 53.01758°N 1.73527°W		Early 19th century	The pump, which was originally in Market Place, is in cast iron and its head is missing. It is octagonal, and has a spout and decorated panels.	II
Railings, gates and gate piers, Belle Vue Road; 53.01670°N 1.73720°W	—	Early 19th century	The iron railings are on a red brick wall with stone coping that runs along the front of the gardens of Nos. 25–29 Belle Vue Road. The gate piers are stuccoed, they have square peaked caps, and some are panelled. At the entrance to the Catholic Church is an overthrow with a lamp.	II
Walton Bank; 53.01361°N 1.72994°W		Early 19th century	A red brick house with a stuccoed eaves cornice and a double-span hipped slate roof. There are two storeys and five bays. In the centre is a round-arched doorway with a coved stuccoed frame and a segmental fanlight. The windows have architraves, those in the centre are sashes. In the outer bays the windows are fixed with central opening casements, those in the ground floor with round-arched heads.	II
31 Church Street; 53.01648°N 1.73527°W		Mid 19th century	The building, at one time a bank, is in stone, with a band, and a dentilled modillion eaves cornice over a band with guilloché decoration. There are two storeys and three bays. In each outer bay is an entrance with a rusticated surround. The windows are sashes with moulded architraves and hood moulds. In the ground floor, the windowsills rest on moulded square piers on a vermiculated plinth, with cast iron screens.	II
29 Market Place; 53.01787°N 1.73309°W	—	Mid 19th century	A shop in red brick with two brick bands and a tile roof. There are three storeys and two bays. In the ground floor are two square bay windows forming shop windows, and the upper floors contain sash windows with small keystones.	II
5 St John's Street; 53.01724°N 1.73326°W	—	Mid 19th century	A stuccoed shop on a corner site, with a sill band, an eaves cornice with a scroll frieze, and a tile roof. There are three storeys, four bays on the front, and one on the right return. In the ground floor is a 19th-century shop front with pilasters and round-headed openings, with slender cast iron pillars between the lights. The windows are sashes in architraves, those in the middle floor with cornices on console brackets.	II
58 St John's Street; 53.01814°N 1.73053°W		Mid 19th century	A red brick house with stone dressings, a plinth, string courses, and a parapet. There are two storeys at the front and five bays. The doorway in the fourth bay has a segmental head, a moulded surround, and a fanlight. The windows are sashes with stone architraves and cornices, the ground floor windows with shutters. At the rear, the house is rendered, and has three storeys and a slate roof.	II
Milestone; 53.01829°N 1.73232°W		19th century	The milepost against the wall of No. 20 Market Square is in cast iron, and has a triangular plan and a rounded top. In the top section are inscribed the distances to London and Manchester, and "ASHBOURNE PARISH", and the lower sections have the distances to Buxton and Derby.	II
Old Tollhouse; 53.00595°N 1.71779°W		Mid 19th century	The former toll house is in red brick with a slate roof. It has a T-shaped plan, the projecting gabled end facing the road, with fretted bargeboards and a finial. The windows are in Tudor style with elaborate glazing. In the gable end is a blank former signboard.	II
The Gables; 53.02382°N 1.73476°W	—	19th century	A house in Jacobean Revival style, in red brick, with a tile roof, and gables with fretted bargeboards. There are two storeys and three bays. On the front is a gabled porch with a finial, and two bay windows, one with two storeys and the other with one. The other windows have hood moulds.	II
Gates, The Laurels; 53.01548°N 1.74063°W	—	19th century	The gates and gate piers are in cast iron. The piers have panels, plinths, quatrefoil motifs, and mace finials.	II
Former railway engine house and goods shed 53.01281°N 1.73873°W		1852	Originally a railway engine house and goods shed built by the North Staffordshire Railway, and later used as a corn mill, it is in white sandstone with a slate roof. There is a single storey and twelve bays. On the front are two wooden canopies with pediments, and the other bays contain recessed panels with pilasters, and a corbelled cornice. The middle four bays also have a blind archivolt, a keystone and a ledge.	II
Town Hall; 53.01828°N 1.73213°W		1861	The town hall is in stone with pilasters, an eaves cornice on elaborate brackets, a parapet, and an elaborate curved pediment containing a clock face. There are two storeys and three bays. In the centre is a porch with an archivolt and a decorated pierced balcony. The windows are sashes, those in the ground floor round-headed. In the upper floor the central window is round-headed with an elaborate keystone, and the outer window have flat heads, architraves curved at the top and containing carving, and aprons with carved panels.	II
Lamp post, Victoria Square; 53.01737°N 1.73316°W		1864	The lamp post in Victoria Square is in cast iron, and is ornate.	II
St John's Church, gates, piers, railings and steps 53.01971°N 1.73272°W		1869–71	The church is in Rundbogenstil style, with many Neo-Norman features. It has an iron frame, and the external walls are in gritstone with freestone dressings and slate roofs. The church consists of a nave, a chancel with an apse, a northeast vestry, and a west tower. The tower has three stages, the lowest stage being the porch. This has a round-headed doorway with two orders of shafts, leaf capitals, and a moulded arch with an inscription in the tympanum. The middle stage contains a two-light west window and circular clock faces. In the top stage are triple round-headed bell openings, above which is a corbel table, and a parapet that has arcading with alternate blind and pierced arches. All the windows have round-arched heads. At the entrance to the churchyard is a dwarf retaining wall with railings, and square gate piers with gabled heads, between which are iron gates. Inside are stone steps, and similar gate piers with cast iron lamp posts.	II*
George and Dragon Public House; 53.01829°N 1.73302°W		Late 19th century	The façade of the public house, which is on a corner site, dates from the late 19th century, and the rest of the building is earlier. It is rendered, with quoins on the corner, and a tile roof. There are three storeys and three bays. Steps with railings and a lamp post lead up to the doorway that has a curved hood with moulding inside and fluted consoles. In the ground floor of the two right bays are bow windows with cornices, and the other windows are sashes. At the top of the middle bay is a half-hipped gable with a recess. The recess has a moulded architrave and a decorated surround, it contains a painted and gilded relief depicting Saint George and the Dragon, and beneath it is a bracketed cornice.	II
National Westminster Bank; 53.01705°N 1.73363°W		Late 19th century	The bank is in red brick, with quoins, a band, an eaves cornice, and a tile roof. There are three storeys and five bays. The doorway is in the right bay, and has a dentilled cornice on consoles. The windows are sashes, in the ground floor with architraves, and in the upper floors with panelled lintels and keystones.	II
Ashbourne Methodist Church; 53.01614°N 1.73523°W		1880	The church, designed by John Wills, is in red-orange brick with dressings in sandstone and terracotta, a chamfered plinth, a full entablature in each storey, and a Welsh slate roof. There are two storeys and a basement, a front of five bays, and eight bays on the right return. Above each floor is a frieze with roundels and a modillion cornice. The outer bays project and have parapets with balustrades and urns. Steps lead up to the central doorway that has Corinthian half-columns, a semicircular fanlight with an archivolt and a keystone with acanthus decoration. In the upper floor are Ionic half-columns. The windows are in round-arched recesses, in the upper floor with two lights, aprons, moulded sills, and keystones. At the top is a pediment with a dated triangular panel in the tympanum.	II
Century Hall, wall and railings 53.01594°N 1.73525°W		c. 1900	A church hall in red brick, partly roughcast, with dressings in sandstone and terracotta, and a hipped roof of red tile and slate with swept eaves. There are two storeys and four bays. In the left bay, steps lead up to a gabled half-timbered porch that has a doorway with a Tudor arch and a brattished tie-beam. The right bay contains a brick porch with tile-hanging on the sides and a swept hipped roof. In the middle bays are circular windows with architraves and keystones in the lower floor, the upper floor contains semicircular windows with voussoirs and keystones, and in the roof are two dormers with swept roofs and pole finials. On the roof is an arcaded cupola with a swept lead roof. In front of the hall is a brick wall, square piers with domed caps, and railings.	II
War Memorial Arch; 53.01832°N 1.73004°W		c. 1920	The arch, commemorating those lost in the First World War, is at the entrance to the park. It has fluted pillars and flanking piers with plaques, and wreaths in relief. On the arch are inscribed the dates of the war, and carving. Flanking the arch are balustrades ending in low pillars with square caps and ball finials. The gates are in wrought and cast iron.	II
Telephone kiosk, Church Street; 53.01679°N 1.73430°W	—	1935	The K6 type telephone kiosk in Church Street was designed by Giles Gilbert Scott. Constructed in cast iron with a square plan and a dome, it has three unperforated crowns in the top panels.	II
Two telephone kiosks, Market Place; 53.01810°N 1.73216°W	—	1935	The two K6 type telephone kiosks in Market Place were designed by Giles Gilbert Scott. Constructed in cast iron with a square plan and a dome, they have three unperforated crowns in the top panels.	II
Bust of Catherine Mumford; 53.01869°N 1.72914°W		Undated	The bust of Catherine Mumford, who married William Booth, and was the co-founder of The Salvation Army is in the War Memorial Park. It depicts her in Salvation Army uniform on a stone pedestal. The original was in bronze, but this was stolen, and has been replaced by a replica in fibreglass.	II
Surface of Tiger Yard; 53.01756°N 1.73342°W	—	Undated	Tiger Yard is paved with cobbles and stone setts.	II
Pavement and step, Old Grammar School; 53.01574°N 1.73751°W	—	Undated	The pavement in front of the Old Grammar School is partly paved and partly cobbled, and running along it is a step down to the roadway.	II
Churchyard walls, St Oswald's Church; 53.01518°N 1.73774°W	—	Undated	The walls run along the boundary of the churchyard on Church Street, to the northeast of the churchyard, and on School Lane, to the east. They are low walls in brick, with stone coping.	II
Cobbled pavement 53.01557°N 1.73759°W		Undated	The cobbled pavement is in front of No. 72 Church Street.	II
