= Ashbourne Town Hall =

Municipal building in Ashbourne, Derbyshire, England

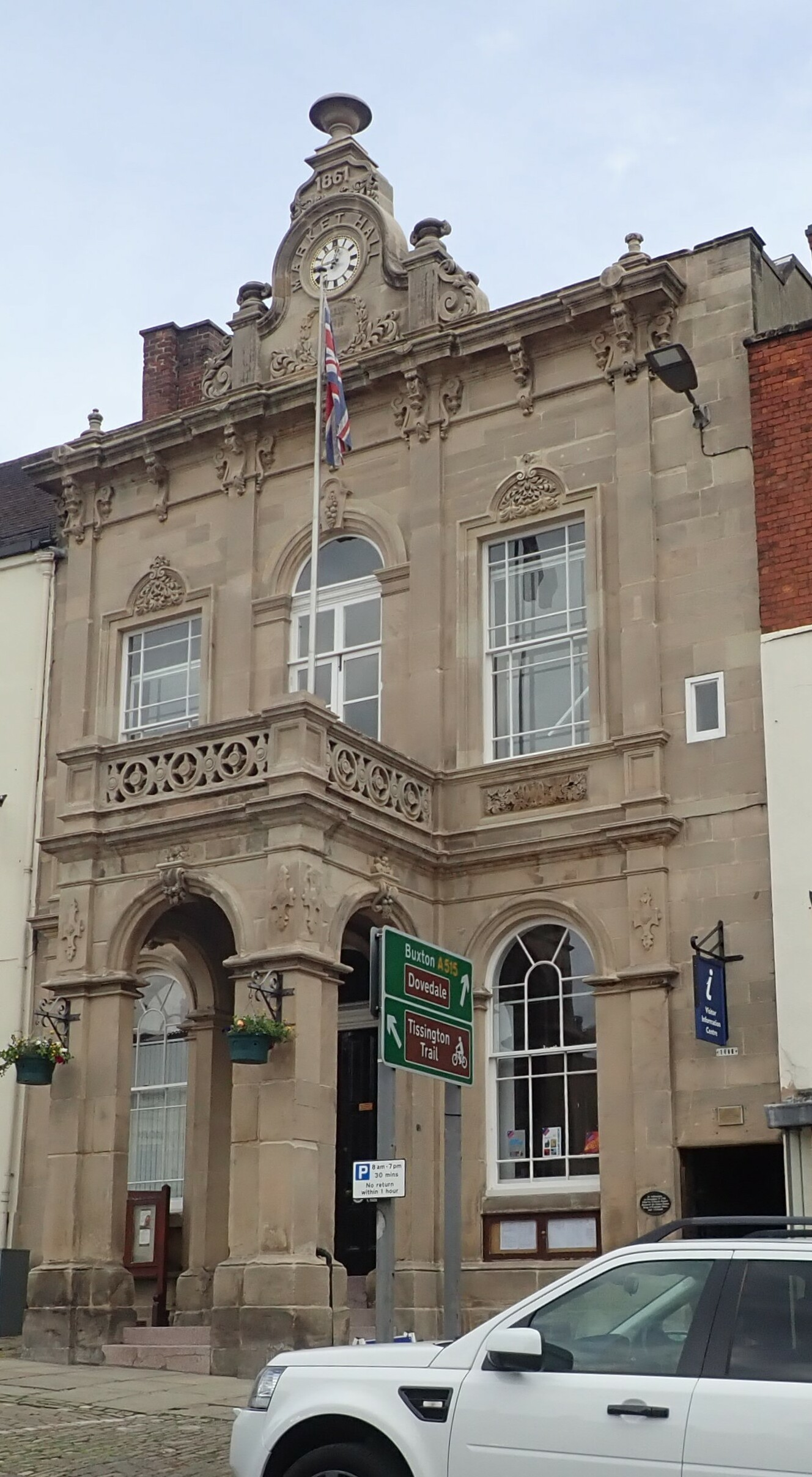
- Ashbourne Town Hall

- Shown in Derbyshire
- 53.0183°N 1.7323°W
- Location: Market Place, Ashbourne

History
- Built: 1861

Site notes
- Architect: Benjamin Wilson
- Architectural style: Italianate style

Listed Building – Grade II
- Official name: The Town Hall
- Designated: 6 May 1970
- Reference no.: 1109530

Ashbourne Town Hall is a municipal building in the Market Place, Ashbourne, Derbyshire, England. The town hall, which is the meeting place of Ashbourne Town Council, is a Grade II listed building.

== History ==
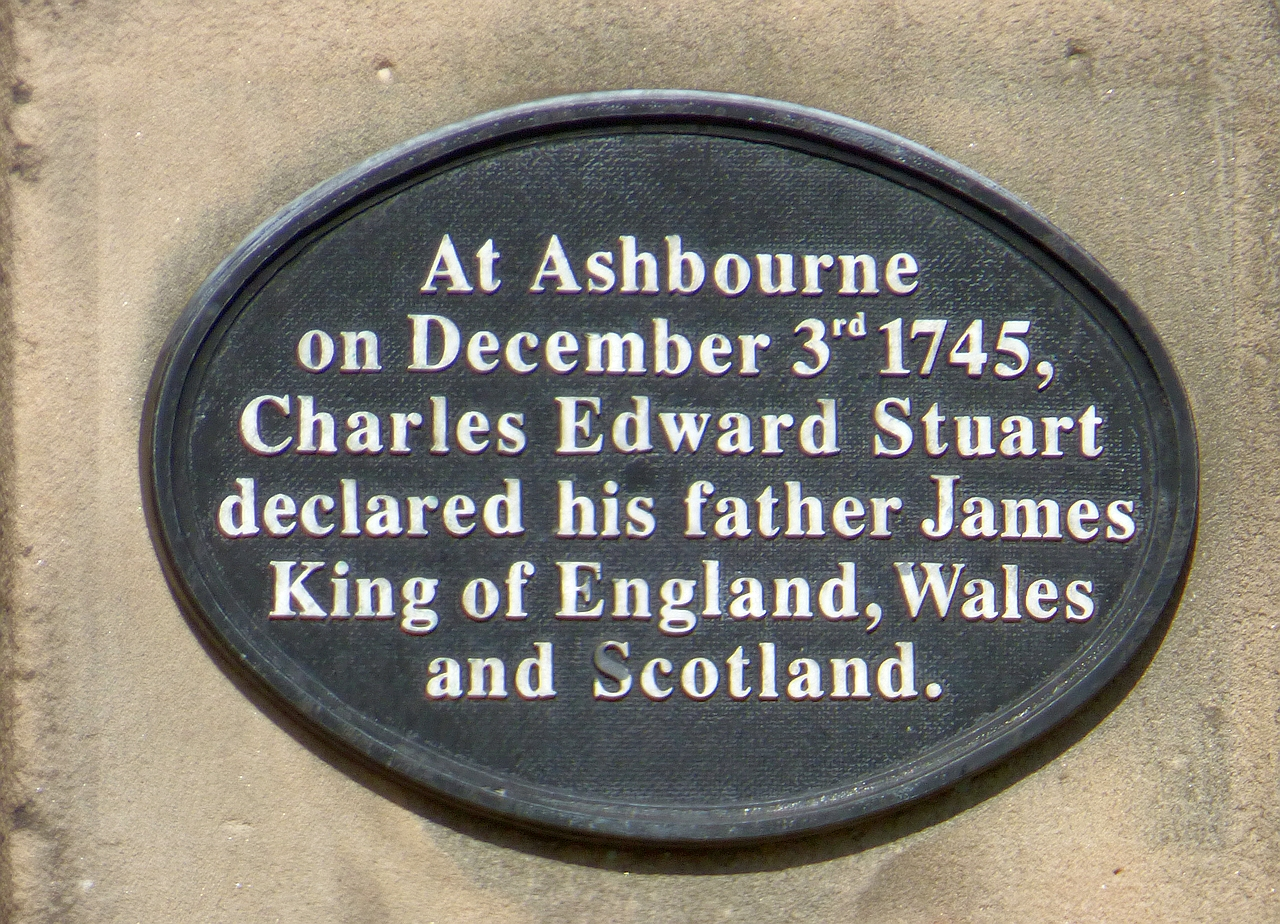
Plaque commemorating the Royal declaration

The site currently occupied by the town hall was previously the location of the Talbot Inn, a public house which dated back at least to the early 17th century. The inn was the venue for the examination of witnesses in a legal case heard in January 1639 in which Sir Andrew Kniveton claimed he had been libelled by William Greaves. A visit by two travellers to the Talbot Inn was described by Izaak Walton in his book The Compleat Angler, first published in 1653, and, it was in the Market Place, outside the inn, that Charles Edward Stuart declared his father, James Francis Edward Stuart, King of England, Wales and Scotland, while passing through Ashbourne in December 1745 during the Jacobite rising.

Although the inn was largely demolished in the mid-19th century, the basement remained in situ when the current building was erected. The new building was designed by Benjamin Wilson in the Italianate style, built in ashlar stone and was completed in 1861. The design involved a symmetrical main frontage with three bays facing onto the Market Place; the central bay featured an elaborate porch with archivolts and a balustrade above. The other bays on the ground floor and the central bay on the first floor were fenestrated by round headed windows while the outer bays on the first floor were fenestrated by square headed windows. At roof level there was an ornate curved pediment with a clock in the tympanum. Internally, the principal room was the main hall.

The building was originally conceived as a market hall, as evidenced by the inscription "Market Hall" carved in stone around the clock: after new market facilities were established elsewhere in the Market Place, the building was re-purposed as an events venue and subsequently referred to as the "Town Hall". When the area became an urban district in 1894, rather than establishing offices in the town hall, civic leaders chose to erect offices for their officers and their departments in Compton Street in 1900.

In November 1930, while a fire bell in the building was being rung to summon the fire engine which was located in a yard on the west side of the Market Place, a heavy bar fell from the bell mechanism killing a member of staff, Tom Fearn. Following local government re-organisation in 1974, the new Ashbourne Town Council established its offices in the building and started to use it as its meeting place. A tourist information centre was also established in the building. An extensive programme of works to restore the crumbling façade of the building was completed to a design by Guy Taylor Associates in October 2018.

== See also ==
- Listed buildings in Ashbourne, Derbyshire
