= Parwich =

Village in Derbyshire, England

Coordinates: 53.088°N 1.719°W

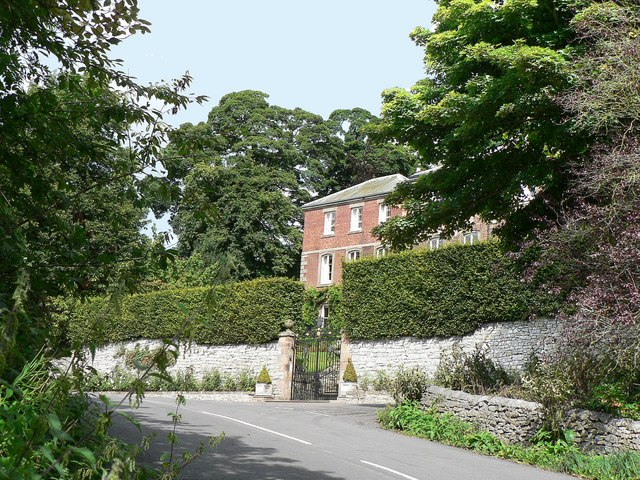
- Parwich Hall

- Location within Derbyshire
- Population: 472 (2011 census)
- OS grid reference: SK188544
- Civil parish: Parwich
- District: Derbyshire Dales
- Shire county: Derbyshire
- Region: East Midlands
- Country: England
- Sovereign state: United Kingdom
- Post town: Ashbourne
- Postcode district: DE6
- Police: Derbyshire
- Fire: Derbyshire
- Ambulance: East Midlands

Parwich is a village and parish in the Derbyshire Dales, 7 miles north of Ashbourne. In the 2011 census the population of the civil parish was 472.

Village facilities include the Anglican church of St Peter's, a primary school, the Sycamore Inn (containing a public house and village shop), the village memorial hall (established in 1962 and rebuilt in 2010), the Royal British Legion club house (established 1951), a hard surfaced play area, a bowling green and a cricket pitch.

== History ==
Parwich is mentioned in the Domesday Book as Pevrewic under Derbyshire in the lands belonging to the king, William the Conqueror. The book, which was written in 1086, said:

In Parwich are 2 carucates of land to the geld. There is land for two ploughs. It is waste. Kolli holds it of the king and he has three villans with two bordars with three ploughs. There are twelve acres of meadow. To this manor belong berewicks of Alsop-en-le-Dale, Hanson Grange and Cold Eaton. There are 2 carucates of land to the geld. There is land for two ploughs. It is waste.

Domesday noted that Parwich together with the manors of Darley, Matlock, Wirksworth and Ashbourne and their berewicks rendered TRE 32 pounds and 6.5 sesters of honey. Now 40 pounds of pure silver.

=== Manor ===
Parwich was part of the ancient Crown lands and after the Conquest was granted to the Ferrers, Earls of Derby. Robert de Ferrers took a prominent part in the Montford Rebellion against the king, and Edward I seized his lands. The king gave the manor to Edmund Crouchback, Earl of Lancaster, and it became part of the Duchy of Lancaster held by the Cokayne family of Ashbourne Hall. In 1603 it was sold to Thomas Levinge and remained in his family until 1814 when it was sold to William Evans. The Levinge family built Parwich Hall in 1747 but were frequently absent. After 1892, the estate was split between the Carrs and the Gisbornes. After World War One, the estate was sold to the Inglefields who sold it in the 1970s.

The school and St Peter's Church, Parwich were erected by Sir Thomas William Evans in 1861 and 1873, although elements of the rebuilt church date back to Norman times and the church tympanum is thought to have pre-Norman origins.

Evans owned Parwich Hall, possibly as a summer retreat from his home in Derby. It was bought in 1814 by William Evans, Thomas's father, who was a Derbyshire MP, but was in use as a vicarage by 1841.

== Governance ==
Historically Parwich was a township, parish and village in the Western division of the county, part of the ancient Wirksworth hundred, and part of the Ashbourne Poor Law Union which came into existence in January 1845.

== Geography ==
Parwich is a village six miles north of Ashbourne. It is surrounded by fields and hills; the nearest main road is the Ashbourne to Bakewell road over a mile away; the Ashbourne to Buxton road is more than two miles away. The houses are built of local limestone and many stand around an open green, through which runs the stream which gave the village its name.

The Peak District Boundary Walk runs north–south through the village, and the Limestone Way long-distance bridleway passes west–east.

== Residents ==
- Joseph Hawley (1603–1690), first member of the Hawley family to arrive to North America, to New England in 1629.

== See also ==
- Listed buildings in Parwich
