= Andrés Vicente Gómez =

Spanish film producer (born 1943)

Andrés Vicente Gómez (born 16 September 1943 in Madrid) is a Spanish film producer, head of Lolafilms, with more than 100 films to his credit.

== Career ==
Gómez is the winner of an Oscar in the category of Best Foreign Language film for Belle Époque. Together with the prizes won at festivals like Berlin, Venice, Montreal and San Sebastian, Gomez´s near annual presence at the Spanish Goya Film Awards make him the Spanish producer with most national and international awards to his name.

Many of Spain´s most successful box-office hits have been produced by Andrés Vicente Gómez, who has worked with directors such as Fernando Trueba, Pedro Almodóvar, Carlos Saura, Bigas Luna, Vicente Aranda, Álex de la Iglesia, Manuel Gutiérrez Aragón, Pilar Miró, Santiago Segura, Jose Luis García Sánchez, John Malkovich, and Ray Loriga, amongst others. In recognition for his work as one of the producers most contributing to cinema, in 1998 the Cannes Film Festival paid tribute to Gómez with a special homage.

As a film distributor from the early 1970s onwards, Andrés Vicente Gómez has brought an eclectic selection of international films to Spanish audiences, with classics from directors like Buster Keaton, Charles Chaplin, Jean-Pierre Melville, and Akira Kurosawa, as well as Oscar scooping titles like "The Last Emperor", "Dances With Wolves", "Driving Miss Daisy" and "Henry V". Gómez has distributed the work of numerous cult directors like Bernardo Bertolucci, Robert Bresson, Claude Chabrol, Peter Greenaway, Shoei Imamura, Krzysztof Kieslovski, Alain Resnais, François Truffaut, Bertrand Tavernier, as well as introducing the independent voices of directors like Hal Hartley, Neil Jordan, Paul Morrisey, Tim Robbins and Alan Rudolph.

=== Alleged embezzlement from Orson Welles ===
Early in his career, Gómez served as a producer on John Hough's 1972 production of Treasure Island, starring Orson Welles. Gómez and Welles hired houses adjacent to one another, and struck up a friendship. Welles was then trying to raise funds for a string of uncompleted films of his own, and Gómez agreed to produce his next film, F for Fake (1973). Gómez recalls, "Treasure Island and [F for] Fake consolidated my relationship with Welles and we signed a three-year agreement of mutual exclusivity through which we expressed our intention to complete all of Orson's unfinished projects. We worked together in 1972 and 1973." Projects worked on as part of this agreement included Don Quixote (filmed intermittently from 1957–72, but released), The Deep (filmed from 1967-9, but unreleased), the TV special Orson's Bag (filmed 1968-71, but never completed), Filming Othello (1978), and the project that Welles considered his major "comeback" film, The Other Side of the Wind (filmed sporadically from 1970-6, but unreleased until 2018). It was this latter project which embroiled Gómez in controversy, after he became the go-between in its complex and unorthodox funding. Barbara Leaming described the situation in her biography of Welles, based on extensive interviews with Welles:

The first of the backers Orson managed to find in Paris was a Spanish acquaintance of his from the international film community [Gómez] who enthusiastically agreed to kick in $350,000, a little less than half of what Orson and Oja had already invested. Shortly thereafter an equivalent sum was pledged by a French-based Iranian group headed by Mehdi B[o]ushehri, the brother-in-law of the Shah ... Dominique Antoine, a Frenchwoman, made the deal with Orson on behalf of the Iranians ... Orson left France with the understanding that the Spanish partner would act as intermediary with the Iranians in Paris ...

But no sooner were Orson and Oja in Spain than trouble started. "We were perfectly all right as long as I was using Oja's money and mine," says Orson, "but the moment we got associates!" The Iranians appeared not to be living up to their end of the deal. Orson heard from the Spaniard who had flown in from Paris, that the Iranians had not given him the money they had promised. There were heavy rains and flooding in Spain, so Orson and Oja were basically cooped up in their hotel, where they worked on a new script together. The Spaniard returned to Paris to try again. "In a minute they're going to have it," he told Orson later. "It looks all right." In lieu of the Iranian funds, he gave them very small sums of money, which he said were part of the investment he had agreed to make. Not until afterward did Orson discover that the Iranians had indeed been giving the Spaniard the promised money, which had come from Iran in cash, and that, instead of bringing it to Spain, the sly fellow was pocketing it. Says Orson: "We just sat, month after month, while he went to Paris, received the money, and came back and told us that they wouldn't give him any money. He was very convincing to us, and very convincing with them in Paris. He kept flying back and forth extracting money from them. We didn't know them, you see. We knew him." The small sums of money he had been giving Orson as if from his own pocket actually came out of the Iranian funds. His constant reassurance to Orson that the Iranians were about to come through was calculated to keep Orson in Spain out of contact with them. On his part, Orson did not want to interfere in what he presumed were his emissary's delicate negotiations with them. It simply never occurred to him that the fellow was lying—and had never any money of his own to invest in the first place...

Meanwhile, due to foul weather, Orson had decided to abandon Spain for Arizona, where John Huston and a host of other faithfuls joined him. ... The swindler continued his game of collecting cash from the Iranians who, having heard only from him, still did not know that anything was wrong. When they received a telex purportedly from John Huston's agent to ask for a $60,000 advance, Dominique Antoine did ask for further verification. But this did not deter the swindler, who sent her a Screen Actor's Guild form with a bogus Social Security number and signature from the States. The Iranians dispatched the $60,000, which was pocketed by the Spaniard rather than Huston, who, out of friendship for Orson, was actually working for much less. After having sent the money, Dominique Antoine had second thoughts about it. Until now she had deliberately left Orson alone because she sensed he preferred it that way. But now something told her there was a problem. "I think I have to go there," she told Boushehri, "even if Orson isn't pleased." Since Orson had yet to receive a penny from the Iranians, their French representative was the last person he expected to see in the Arizona desert. He could not have been happy to see her. When almost instantly he asked her where the money was, she nervously told him that she had been making regular payments to the intermediary, who obviously hadn't passed them on to him, he broke down.

The film's producer Dominique Antoine subsequently endorsed the above account from Barbara Leaming as being "entirely accurate." A July 1986 article in American Cinematographer also corroborates this story, describing Antoine's arrival in Arizona on the set at Southwestern Studios late at night. This story is further corroborated by Peter Bogdanovich, who wrote in November 1997 of the production, "another producer ran back to Europe with $250,000 of Orson's money and never was heard from again (although I recently saw the person on TV accepting an Oscar for coproducing the Best Foreign Film of the year.)" In 2008, film scholars Jean-Pierre Berthomé and François Thomas identified Gómez (who collected a Best Foreign Picture Oscar in 1994) as the alleged embezzler, and they date his withdrawal from the project to 1974. Gómez first met Welles in Spain in 1972, during the making of Treasure Island, in which they were both involved. Gómez then negotiated Welles' deal with the Iranian-owned, Paris-based "Les Films de l'Astrophore", the first product of which was the 1973 film F for Fake, followed by The Other Side of the Wind. As well as the accusation of embezzlement, Welles also had this to say of Gómez: "My Spanish producer never paid my hotel bill for the three months that he kept me waiting in Madrid for the money for The Other Side of the Wind. So I'm scared to death to be in Madrid. I know they're going to come after me with that bill."

Gómez responded to these accusations in a 2001 memoir, subsequently reproduced on his company website:

Regarding the end of my relationship with Orson Welles some lies were told, although he assured me they did not come from him. [A point contradicted by the extensively quoted Leaming account above, which showed the accusations came from an interview with Welles himself; as well as the quote about the hotel bill, which comes from a subsequently emerged (in 2013) audio tape of Welles.] Accordingly, I don't want to go into that matter. I don't deem it relevant to mention the details of our split considering that our relationship was always polite and amicable and we had wonderful moments and experiences together. However, I must make it clear that if I abandoned the project, I didn't do so for financial reasons. My agreement with Welles, written and signed by him, envisaged my work as a producer, not an investor. ... Certain people who were close to Welles and part of his inner circle - the same ones who are spoiling his works and making a living from them—tried to justify his difficulties by linking them to the fact that I pulled out. They have even gone so far as to say that I had pocketed some of the Iranian money which in fact never existed, beyond the funds that were spent appropriately.

Gómez was later interviewed for a 2018 documentary on the making of the film, They'll Love Me When I'm Dead, in which he said, "I read he blamed me because of the finance fiasco, which is totally untrue. I made a settlement with him, there was no complaint, there was no anything. If it was true, why didn't they make any claim from me, you know?"

Josh Karp's 2015 book on the making of the film cited several pieces of documentary proof which support the allegation:

There are two sets of documents that support this version of events. The first is an August 1974 legal agreement dissolving Orson's partnership with everyone but Astrophore which specifies that [Gómez's] company "failed to" provide its own investment of $150,000 and also had failed to open a production account as it had been obligated to do under a 1973 agreement. Additionally, it claims that the producer's company had misappropriated a whole or substantial part of the money received from Astrophore.
In 1976 and 1977, Boushehri had Coopers and Lybrand audit both Astrophore and the production of The Wind. In each report the auditors stated that Avenel [Welles and Kodar's production company] had signed an August 3, 1973, agreement with the producer's company and with Astrophore under which Orson and Oja's interest in the film was $750,000, while the Iranians and the man's production company were each obligated to provide $150,000 toward completion of the movie. The audits repeat the accusation that the producer misappropriated money he was supposed to transmit from Astrophore to Orson.

Karp's 2015 book also reproduces contemporary (May 2, 1974) correspondence from one of the film's creditors Jim Hines to Frank Marshall, in which Hines claims that "The Maricopa County, Arizona prosecutor's office has filed Criminal charges" against Gómez, and that "They have completed their initial investigation and will issue a warrant for his incarceration should he return to the United States. Grand Larceny is an extraditable offense and, as of May 5th (I believe) he will be considered a fugitive by both the State of Arizona and the United States. His Federal Offense will be interstate flight to avoid Prosecution." Gómez's 2001 memoir notes that after leaving the set in Arizona, he travelled to California to get a flight to New Mexico, where he spent three days drinking and smoking marijuana with Dennis Hopper, before returning to Spain, where "an office awaited me in Madrid that served the purpose of a production-distribution company" which kick-started his new career as a distributor of arthouse films in Spain in the mid-1970s. Karp nonetheless notes that Gómez "has never been charged with a crime, nor been the subject to a civil suit in connection with the accusation."

=== Recent work ===
In recent years, Andrés Vicente Gómez has carried producing on a constant stream of Spanish and English language films, such as Rain, co-produced with Martin Scorsese, "The Dance Upstairs" starring Javier Bardem and directed by John Malkovich; "Nearest to Heaven" starring Catherine Deneuve; "Navidad en el Nilo" and "Navidad en Nueva York" in co-production with Aurelio di Laurentiis; "Soldados de Salamina" by David Trueba, and "La Fiesta del Chivo" by Vargas Llosa, starring Isabella Rosellini; "Isi Disi" starring Santiago Segura and "Manolete", starring Adrien Brody and Penélope Cruz; "Lolita´s Club" by Vicente Aranda, and "Io don Giovanni" by Carlos Saura; "El Consul de Sodoma" starring Jordi Mollá; and "La Chispa de la Vida" directed by Álex de la Iglesia.

Gómez also produced the stage musicals "The Last Horseman" and "Ay, Carmela!"

In addition to his extensive work as producer and distributor, Andrés Vicente Gómez is President of the Media Business School, a prestigious development and training centre of the European Union, founded in 1990. He is in possession of the honor of France's Cavalier de les Arts. In 2003, was chosen as President of the FIAPF, a post he held until 2008.

Since 2010 he works in the Middle East, especially in Saudi Arabia, participating in the creation of the country's audiovisual industry and producing in 2014 the first international film shot in the country, Born King (Born a King).

== Filmography ==
- Comanche Blanco (1968) by Gilbert Kay José Briz
- El Hambre en el Mundo (1968) by José Briz
- Belleza Negra (1971) by James Hill Andrea Bianchi
- Diabólica malicia (1972) by James Kelley Andrea Bianchi
- La isla del tesoro (1972) by Andrea Bianchi John Hough
- El complot de los rebeldes (1973) by René Gainville
- La loba y la Paloma (1973) by Gonzalo Suárez
- El asesino no está solo(1973) by Jesús García de Dueñas
- F for Fake,(1973) by Orson Welles
- El cielo se caeLas Flores del Vicio (1975) by Silvio Narizzano
- La querida (1976) by Fernando Fernán Gómez
- Quería dormir en paz (1976) by Emma Cohen(Shortfilm)
- La Raulito en libertad (1977) by Lautaru Murúa
- ¿Por qué perdimos la guerra (1977) by Diego Santillán and Luis Galindo
- La viuda andaluza (1978) by Francesc Betriu
- La verdad sobre el caso Savolta (1979) by Antonio Drove
- Silvia ama a Raquel (1979) by Diego Santillán
- Cocaína (1980) by Julio Wizuete and Jimmy Gimé
- Corridas de alegría (1980) by Gonzalo García Pelayo
- Black Venus (1983) by Claude Mulot
- Los caraduros (1983) by Antonio Ozores
- El pan debajo del brazo (1984) by Mariano Ozores
- Christina y la reconversión sexual (1984) by Francisco Lara Polop
- La flecha negra (1985) by John Hough
- Sé infiel y no mires con quién (1985) by Fernando Trueba
- Matador (1986) by Pedro Almodóvar
- El año de las luces (1986), by Fernando Trueba
- La Intrusa (1987) by Jaime Chávarri
- El pecador impecable (1987) by Augusto Martínez Torres
- Los negros también comen (1987) by Marco Ferreri
- El Dorado (1988) by Carlos Saura
- Remando al viento(1987), by Gonzalo Suárez
- La estanquera de Vallecas(1987), by Eloy de la Iglesia
- Miss Caribe (1988), by Fernando Colomo
- Pasodoble (1988), by José Luis García Sánchez
- La noche oscura (1989) by Carlos Saura
- El sueño del mono loco (1989) by Fernando Trueba
- El regreso de los mosqueteros (1989) de Richard Lester
- ¡Ay, Carmela! (1990) by Carlos Saura
- Las edades de Lulú (1990) by Bigas Luna
- Cómo ser mujer y no morir en el intento (1990) by Ana Belén
- La otra historia de Rosendo Juarez (1990), by Gerardo Vera
- La noche más larga (1991) by José Luis García Sánchez
- Beltenebros (1991) by Pilar Miró
- Una mujer bajo la lluvia (1991) by Gerardo Vera
- El evangelio según San Marcos (1991) by Héctor Oliveira
- La mujer y el pelele (1991) by Mario Camús
- Jamón, jamón (1991) by Bigas Luna
- Una mujer bajo la lluvia (1992) by Gerardo Vera
- La Reina Anónima (1992) by Gonzalo Suárez
- Emma Zunz (1992) by Benoît Jacquot
- Belle Époque (1992) by Fernando Trueba
- Marathon (1993) by Carlos Saura
- La Muerte y la Brújula (1993) by Alex Cox
- El amante bilingüe (1993) by Vicente Aranda
- Huevos de oro (1993) by Bigas Luna
- Tirano Banderas (1993) by José Luis García Sánchez
- Cómo ser infeliz y disfrutarlo (1993) by Enrique Urbizu
- La teta y la luna (1994) by Bigas Luna
- El detective y la muerte (1994) by Gonzalo Suárez
- La pasión turca (1994) by Vicente Aranda
- El rey del río (1994) by Manuel Gutiérrez Aragón
- Cuernos de mujer (1994) by Enrique Urbizu
- Antártida (1995) by Manuel Huerga
- El día de la Bestia (1995) by Álex de la Iglesia
- Two Much (1995) by Fernando Trueba
- Palace (1995) by Joan Gràcia Paco Mir Carles Sans
- Matías, juez de línea (1995) by Santiago Aguilar Paco Mir
- El perro del hortelano (1995) by Pilar Miró
- Libertarias (1996) by Vicente Aranda
- Hollow Reed (1996) by Angela Pope
- La lengua asesina (1996) by Alberto Sciamma
- La Celestina (1996) by Gerardo Vera
- Más allá del jardín(1996) by Pedro Olea
- Sus ojos se cerraron y el mundo sigue andando (1997) by Jaime Chávarri
- Hasta la victoria siempre (1997) by Juan Carlos Desanzo
- Sólo se muere dos veces (1996) by Esteban Ibarretxe
- Tranvía a la Malvarrosa (1996) by José Luis García Sánchez
- En brazos de la mujer madura (1996) by Manuel Lombardero
- La duquesa roja (1996) by Francesc Betriu
- Perdita Durango (1997) by Álex de la Iglesia
- Grandes ocasiones (1997) by Felipe Vega
- La mirada del otro (1997) by Vicente Aranda
- Una pareja perfecta (1997), by Francesc Betriu
- Torrente, el brazo tonto de la ley (1998), by Santiago Segura
- La niña de tus ojos (1998), by Fernando Trueba
- Muertos de risa (1998), by Álex de la Iglesia
- No se lo digas a nadie (1998), de Francisco Lombardi
- Un dulce olor a muerte(1999), de Gabriel Retes
- Goya en Burdeos (1999), by Carlos Saura
- Segunda piel (1999), by Gerardo Vera
- El portero (2000), by Gonzalo Suárez
- La comunidad (2000), by Álex de la Iglesia
- Lázaro de Tormes (2000), by Fernando Fernán Gómez, José Luis García Sánchez
- Torrente 2: Misión en Marbella (2001), by Santiago Segura
- Tardes de Gaudí (2000), by Susan Seidelman
- El paraíso ya no es lo que era (2000), by Francesc Betriu
- La voz de su amo (2000), by Emilio Martínez Lázaro
- Juego de Luna (2001), by Mónica Laguna
- Son de mar (2001), by Bigas Luna
- Girl from Rio (2001), by Christopher Monger
- Tuno negro (2001), by Pedro L. Barbero, Vicente J. Martín
- Rain (2001), by Katherine Lindberg
- Desafinado (2001), by Manuel Gómez Pereira
- Pasos de baile (2001), by John Malkovich
- No somos nadie (2001), by Jordi Mollà
- Ultimas vacaciones (2001), by Neri Parenti
- La marcha verde (2001), by José Luis García Sánchez
- El embrujo de Shanghai (2002), by Fernando Trueba
- Lo más cercano al cielo (2002), by Tonie Marshall
- El robo más grande jamás contado (2002), by Daniel Monzón
- Navidad en el Nilo (2002), by Neri Parenti
- Deseo (2002), by Gerardo Vera
- Los niños de San Judas (2003), by Aisling Walsh
- La hija del caníbal (2003), by Antonio Serrano
- Soldados de Salamina (2003), by David Trueba
- Tiempo de tormenta (2003), by Pedro Olea
- ¡Buen viaje, excelencia! (2003), by Albert Boadella
- El 7º día (2004), by Carlos Saura
- Isi/Disi – Amor a lo bestia (2004), by Chema de la Peña
- Sinfín (2005), by Manuel Sanabria, Carlos Villaverde
- La fiesta del Chivo (2005), by Luis Llosa
- Isi & Disi, alto voltaje (2006), by Miguel Ángel Lamata
- Teresa, el cuerpo de Cristo (2007), by Ray Loriga
- Canciones de amor en Lolita's Club (2007), by Vicente Aranda
- Manolete (2008), by Menno Meyjes
- Io, Don Giovanni (2009), by Carlos Saura
- El cónsul de Sodoma (2009), by Sigfrid Monleón
- La chispa de la vida (2011), by Álex de la Iglesia
- Herederos de la bestia (2016)
- Born a King (2014) by Agustí Villaronga
- Champions (2020) by Manuel Calvo

== TV ==
- Los pazos de Ulloa (1984) by Gonzalo Suárez TV Mini-Series
- La grande collection (1991) TV Series
- Cuentos de Borges (1993) TV Series
- Petra Delicado (1999) TV Series
- Far From Home (2014) TV Series
- To-Day (2014) TV Series

== Musicals ==
- The Last Horseman,(2012) directed by Victor Conde
- ¡Ay Carmela!, (2013) directed by Andrés Lima
