= Cockayne (disambiguation) =

Cockayne is a mythical land of plenty.

Cockayne may refer to:

- Cockayne (surname)
- Cockayne, North Yorkshire, a hamlet and ridge in North Yorkshire, England
- Cockayne baronets
- Cockayne syndrome
- Cockaigne (In London Town), an overture by Edward Elgar

== See also ==
- Land of Cockayne (disambiguation)
- George Cokayne (1825–1911), English officer of arms
- Cocaine (disambiguation)
