= Listed buildings in Eaton and Alsop =

Eaton and Alsop is a civil parish in the Derbyshire Dales district of Derbyshire, England. The parish contains five listed buildings that are recorded in the National Heritage List for England. All the listed buildings are designated at Grade II, the lowest of the three grades, which is applied to "buildings of national importance and special interest". The parish contains the village of Alsop en le Dale and the surrounding area. The listed buildings consist of a church, two farmhouses, a private house, and a milepost.

== Buildings ==
Name and location	Photograph	Date	Notes
St Michael and All Angels' Church; 53.09315°N 1.76229°W		12th century	The church, which has been altered and extended through the centuries, was restored, and the tower was rebuilt in Norman style, in 1882–83. The church is built in limestone with gritstone dressings and has slate roofs. It consists of a nave, a lower chancel and a west tower. The tower has quoins, a west lancet window, square windows on the north and south sides, two-light bell openings in a recessed arch, a string course and a parapet. The south doorway dates from the 12th century, it has two orders, and is much restored.
Alsop Hall; 53.09367°N 1.76322°W		17th century	The house, which has been much altered, is in limestone with gritstone dressings, quoins, and tile roofs. The main block has three storeys and three bays, the outer bays gabled, flanking two-storey wings, a single-storey extension to the right, and a later rear extension with three gables. The doorway has a chamfered surround and a hood mould, and most of the windows are mullioned or mullioned and transomed.
Manor Farmhouse; 53.09361°N 1.76151°W		Late 17th century	The farmhouse is in limestone with gritstone dressings and a tile roof. There are two storeys, and a two-bay range with projecting gabled wings. The doorway has a chamfered surround, and the windows either have a single light, or are mullioned.
Church Farmhouse; 53.09324°N 1.76126°W		Late 18th century	The farmhouse is in limestone with gritstone dressings and a stone slate roof. There are two storeys and an attic, and a symmetrical front of three bays. The central doorway has a semicircular fanlight and a hood mould, and the windows are sashes. At the rear is a blocked tall stair window, mullioned windows and a sash window.
Milepost; 53.10742°N 1.76002°W		Early 19th century	The milepost is on the northwest side of the A515 road. It is in cast iron, with a triangular plan and a sloping top. On the top are inscribed "ALSOP EN LE DALE PARISH" and the distances to London and Derby, and on the sides are the distances to Ashbourne and Buxton.
