= Cockayne (surname) =

Cockayne Coat of Arms

Cockayne is an English surname.

== Etymology ==
The name originates as a joking reference to the Land of Cockaigne, a mythical land of plenty and hedonism which is widely talked of in medieval European literature. It seems that in at least some cases, people acquired the cognomen Cockayne because they were themselves gluttons or daydreamers; the first person in Britain known to have borne the name is William Cokein, mentioned in 1193. However, several real places were also named Cockayne, either directly, as a joking reference to the mythical place (examples may include Cocken in Dalton, Lancashire and Cocking Lane in Clayton, West Yorkshire), or because they were owned by people who had previously acquired the surname Cockayne (as in the case of Cockayne Hatley). Thus some people many have acquired the surname Cockayne not because of their personal characteristics, but because they came from a place called Cockayne.

== Distribution ==
In 1881, 900 people bore the name in Great Britain, mostly in Derbyshire, Staffordshire, Nottinghamshire, and the West Riding of Yorkshire. Around 2016, one person held the surname in Ireland and 1350 in Great Britain.

== People with the surname Cockayne ==
- Aston Cockayne (1608–1684), Cavalier, writer
- Ben Cockayne (born 1983), English rugby player
- David Cockayne (1942–2010), British electron microscopist and university professor
- Edward Alfred Cockayne (1880–1956), English physician
- Elizabeth Cockayne (1894–1988), British Chief Nursing Officer
- Emily Cockayne (born 1973), British historian
- George Edward Cokayne (1825–1911), English genealogist
- Henry Cockayne-Cust (1819–1884), British Conservative Party politician
- Ida Cockayne (1368–1426), Welsh-Norman noblewoman
- Leonard Cockayne (1855–1934), New Zealand botanist
- Oswald Cockayne (1807–1873), churchman and philologist
- William Cockayne (1561–1626), London merchant, alderman, and Lord Mayor

== See also ==
- Cockayne Baronets
