= Alejandro Carrión =

Ecuadorian poet, journalist, and author

- Born: Alejandro Carrión Aguirre; March 11, 1915; Loja, Ecuador
- Died: January 4, 1992 (aged 76); Quito, Ecuador
- Occupation: Writer
- Relatives: Benjamín Carrión (1897–1979), uncle
- Writing career
- Language: Spanish
- Notable awards: Maria Moors Cabot prize (New York, 1961), Premio Eugenio Espejo (Ecuador, 1981), XIV Premio Leopoldo Alas 'Clarin' (Barcelona, 1969)

Alejandro Carrión Aguirre (11 March 1915 – 4 January 1992) was an Ecuadorian poet, novelist and journalist. He wrote the novel La espina (1959), the short story book La manzana dañada (1983), and numerous poetry books. As a journalist he published many of his articles under the pseudonym "Juan Sin Cielo." In 1956 he founded, along with Pedro Jorge Vera, the political magazine La Calle. He directed the literary magazine Letras del Ecuador. He received the Maria Moors Cabot prize (1961) from the Columbia University Graduate School of Journalism as well as the Ecuadorian National Prize Premio Eugenio Espejo (1981) for his body of work. He was the nephew of Benjamín Carrión and Clodoveo Carrión.

== Biography ==
=== The journalist ===
Alejandro Carrión wrote articles and political commentary in the following periodicals and newspapers:

==== Newspapers ====
- El Tiempo, Bogotá, 1947
- La Tierra, Quito 1942–1948
- El Sol, Quito, 1950;
- La Razón, Guayaquil, 1968–1969
- El Universo, Guayaquil, 1948–1968
- Diario Las Américas, Miami, 1970–1979
- Diario El Comercio, Quito 1980–1992

==== Magazines ====
- Revista de la Casa de la Cultura Ecuatoriana, 1945–1950
- Letras del Ecuador, 1945–1950
- Sábado, Bogotá, 1947
- La Calle, Quito 1959–1969
- Vistazo, Guayaquil 1969–1992;
- Américas, Washington, D.C., 1977–1979
- Revista de la Sociedad Jurídico-Literaria, 1981–1982

== Bibliography ==
=== Poetry ===
A selection of Alejandro Carrión's poetry was recorded in Quito for the Library of Congress in Washington; a copy of that recording is housed at Harvard University's "House of the Poetry". Alejandro told of his emotional reaction to hearing his own words when visiting in the company of the poet Archibald McLeish: "small satisfactions that illuminate the life of a poet."

- Poemas de un portero - Poems of a Doorman (1932–1934)
- Luz del nuevo paisaje - Light of the New Landscape (1934–1935)
- Poesía de la soledad y el deseo - Poetry of Solitude and Desire (1934–1939)
- Agonía del árbol y la sangre - Agony of the Tree and the Blood (1934–1944)
- La noche oscura - Dark Night (1934–1954)
- La sangre sobre la tierra - The Blood on the Earth (1946–1957)
- Nunca! Nunca - Never! Never (1955–1957)
- El Tiempo que pasa - "Time that Passes" (1957–1962)
- Poeta y peregrino - "Poet and Traveler" (1960–1965)
- Poesia primera jornadad - "Poetry anthology, the early years" (1932–1957)
- Poesia segunda jornada - "Poetry anthology, the final years" (1957–1984)
- Aquí, España Nuestra!, tres poemas en esperanza y amargura (1938)
- Cuaderno de canciones (1954)
- Canto a la América Española (1954)

=== Novel ===
- 1959 La espina

=== Short Story ===
- 1968 Muerte en su Isla
- 1970 La llave perdida
- 1978 Mala procesión de hormigas
- 1983 La manzana dañada
- 1983 Divino tesoro
- 1983 Una pequeña muerte

=== History ===
- 1954 Primicias de la poesía quiteña
- 1957 Los poetas quiteños de "El Ocioso en Faenza"
- 1978 La otra historia, ensayos
- 1992 Antología General de la Poesía Ecuatoriana durante la Colonia Española
- 1992 El último rincón del mundo

=== Prose ===
- 1948 Los compañeros de Don Quixote
- 1948 Elogio de la novela policíaca
- 1972 Los Colores del Sueño
- 1983 Nuestro Simón Bolívar
- 1983 Galería de retratos
- 1983 Los caminos de Dios
- 1983 Gana de hablar
- 1983 En el país de los Golillas
- 1983 La pavimentación del infierno

=== Journalism ===
- 1983 Esta vida de Quito por Juan sin Cielo
- 1992 Una Cierta Sonrisa
