= St Edmund's Church, Fenny Bentley =

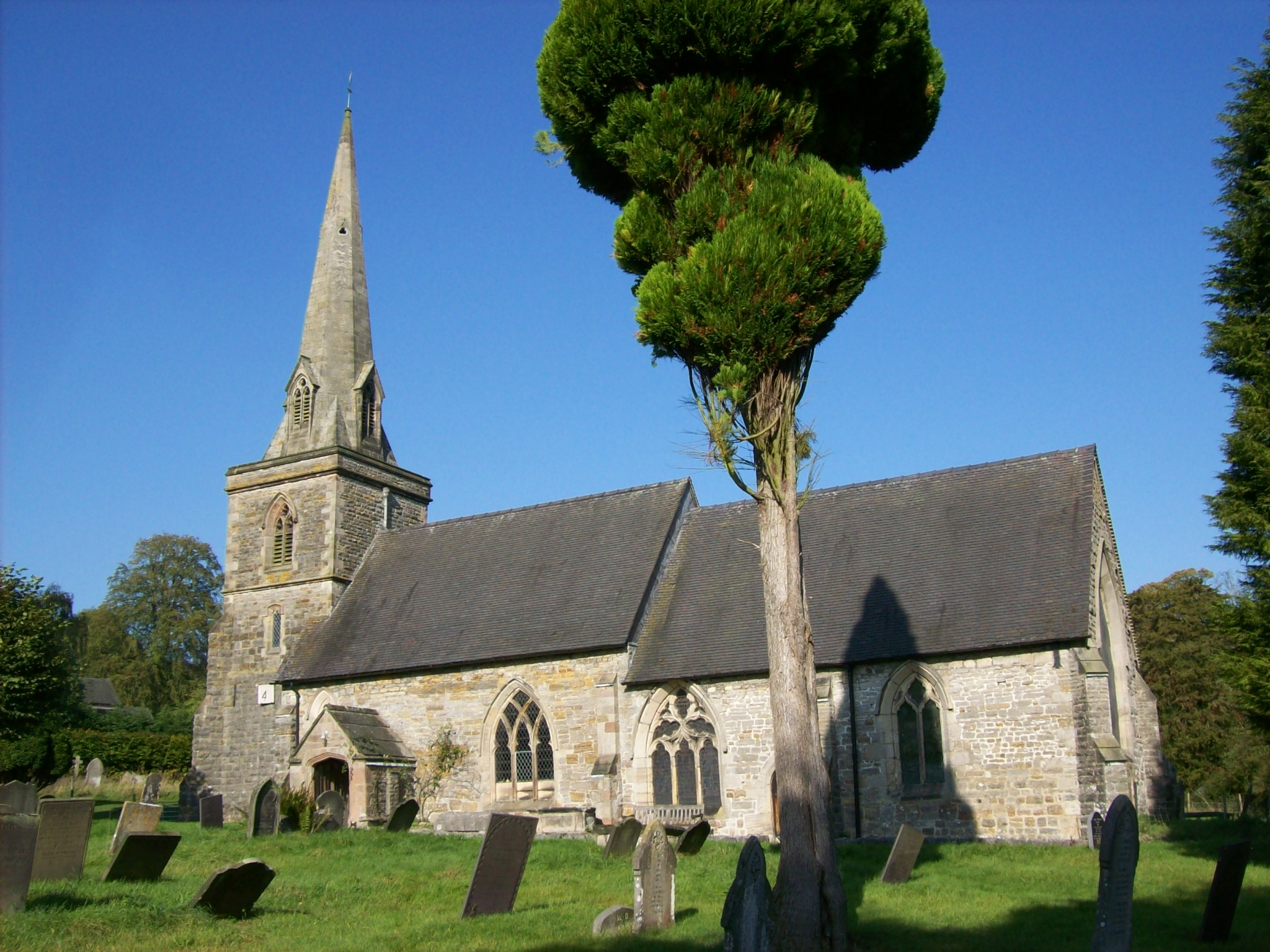
- St Edmund's Church, Fenny Bentley
- St Edmund's Church, Fenny Bentley
- 53°02′55.29″N 1°44′27.59″W
- Location: Fenny Bentley
- Country: England
- Denomination: Church of England
- Website: Peak Seven

History
- Dedication: Edmund the Martyr

Architecture
- Heritage designation: Grade II* listed

Administration
- Diocese: Diocese of Derby
- Archdeaconry: Derby
- Deanery: Ashbourne
- Parish: Fenny Bentley

St Edmund's Church, Fenny Bentley is a Grade II* listed parish church in the Church of England in Fenny Bentley, Derbyshire.

== History ==
The church dates from around 1300. It was restored between 1847 and 1850 by Henry Isaac Stevens and Frederick Josias Robinson. The west tower was rebuilt in 1864. New stained glass windows were installed in 1892 by Edward Reginald Frampton. It contains a 16th-century stone screen and the Elizabethan tombs of Thomas Beresford (died 1473) and his wife, upon which the effigies are shown bundled up in shrouds, possibly because the sculptor had no likeness to work from.

== Parish status ==
The church is a member of the Peak Seven group of churches along with:

- St Michael and All Angels’ Church, Alsop-en-le-Dale
- St Thomas's Church, Biggin
- St Giles Church, Hartington
- St Peter's Church, Parwich
- St Leonard's Church, Thorpe
- St Mary's Church, Tissington

== Memorials ==
- Richard Fitzherbert (d. 1790)
- Thomas Beresford (d. 1473)

== Organ ==
The church contains a pipe organ by Brindley & Foster. A specification of the organ can be found on the National Pipe Organ Register.

== See also ==
- Grade II* listed buildings in Derbyshire Dales
- Listed buildings in Fenny Bentley
