= St Michael and All Angels' Church, Alsop-en-le-Dale =

St Michael and All Angels' Church, Alsop en le Dale
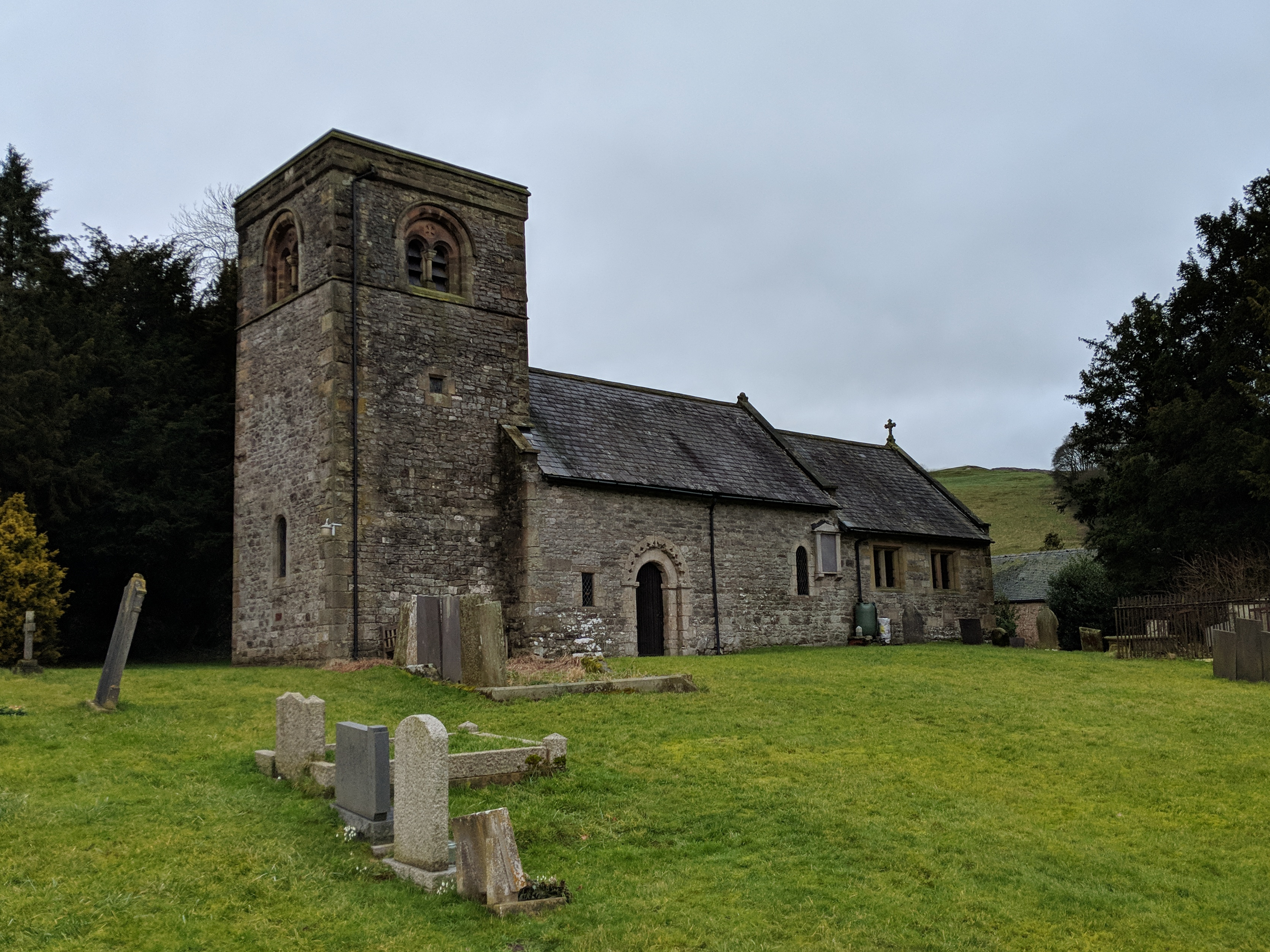
- St Michael and All Angels' Church, Alsop en le Dale
- 53°05′35.31″N 1°45′44.04″W
- Location: Alsop en le Dale
- Country: England
- Denomination: Church of England
- Website: Peak Seven

History
- Dedication: St Michael and all Angels

Architecture
- Heritage designation: Grade II listed

Specifications
- Length: 52.5 feet (16.0 m)
- Width: 13.8 feet (4.2 m)

Administration
- Diocese: Diocese of Derby
- Archdeaconry: Derby
- Deanery: Ashbourne
- Parish: Alsop en le Dale

St Michael and all Angels' Church, Alsop en le Dale is a Grade II listed parish church in the Church of England in Alsop en le Dale, Derbyshire.

== History ==
The church dates from the 12th century and was rebuilt between 1882 and 1883 by Frederick Josias Robinson at a cost of £840. The flat roof was removed and replaced with a pitched roof, and the plaster on the walls was removed. The floors were re-laid, that in the chancel with Minton encaustic tiles, and the rest with wooden blocks. A new stone font replaced the old one. The pulpit, which had formerly been in St Oswald's Church, Ashbourne, was installed. The contractor was J. Knowles of Brassington.

The church has a Norman south doorway with zig-zag carvings, and the imposts of the chancel arch are also Norman, as is a window in the south wall. The Normanesque tower, however, dates from the 19th-century restoration.

== Parish status ==
The church is a member of the Peak Seven group of churches along with:

- St Thomas's Church, Biggin
- St Edmund's Church, Fenny Bentley
- St Giles Church, Hartington
- St Peter's Church, Parwich
- St Leonard's Church, Thorpe
- St Mary's Church, Tissington

== See also ==
- Listed buildings in Eaton and Alsop
