= Second Skin (1999 film) =

- Theatrical release poster
- Spanish: Segunda piel
- Directed by: Gerardo Vera
- Written by: Ángeles González Sinde; Gerardo Vera
- Produced by: Andrés Vicente Gómez
- Starring: Javier Bardem; Jordi Mollà; Ariadna Gil; Cecilia Roth
- Cinematography: Julio Madurga
- Edited by: Nicholas Wentworth
- Music by: Roque Baños
- Production companies: Lolafilms; Vía Digital; Antena 3 de Televisión
- Distributed by: Lolafilms Distribución
- Release dates: December 1999 (Goya Awards screening); 14 January 2000 (Spain)
- Running time: 100 minutes
- Country: Spain
- Language: Spanish

Second Skin (Spanish: Segunda piel) is a 1999 Spanish romantic drama film directed by Gerardo Vera, starring Javier Bardem, Jordi Mollà, Ariadna Gil and Cecilia Roth.

== Premise ==
Elena and Alberto, a couple from Madrid, have a happy marriage, professional success and a loving son. However, Elena later finds a hotel receipt in Alberto's pocket and discovers that he has been unfaithful to her. To her surprise, the one who has been involved is another man, Diego.

== Cast ==
- Javier Bardem as Diego
- Jordi Mollà as Alberto
- Cecilia Roth as Eva
- Ariadna Gil as Elena
- Mercedes Sampietro as María Elena
- Javier Albalá as Rafael
- Adrián Sac as Adrián
- Cristina Espinosa as Ana Mari
- Pilar Castro as Neus
- Ramiro Alonso as Oriol
- Silvia Espigado as Ingeniera
- Carmen Grey as Enfermera

== Production ==
Second Skin is a Antena 3 Televisión, Lolafilms and Vía Digital production. Filming began in March 1999 in Madrid. Shooting locations also included Benicàssim. The screenplay was penned by Gerardo Vera alongside Ángeles González-Sinde. Other production duties were tasked to Julio Madurga (cinematography) and Roque Baños (score).

== Reception ==
Reviewing for Miami New Times, David Ehrenstein compared the film to Making Love (1982), considering that the film "is less sexually skittish than its predecessor, and a lot less reassuring about the marital dissolution in the wake of homosexual self-discovery". The review in Fotogramas scored the film with 3 out of 5 stars, considering the performances by Bardem and Gil to be the best about the film, while citing the "over-emphatic" musical score as a negative point.

== Accolades ==
Year	Award	Category	Nominee(s)	Result	Ref.
2000	14th Goya Awards	Best Actor	Jordi Mollà	Nominated	

== See also ==
- List of Spanish films of 2000
