= Parwich Hall =

Mansion house in Derbyshire, England

Coordinates: 53.0881°N 1.7232°W

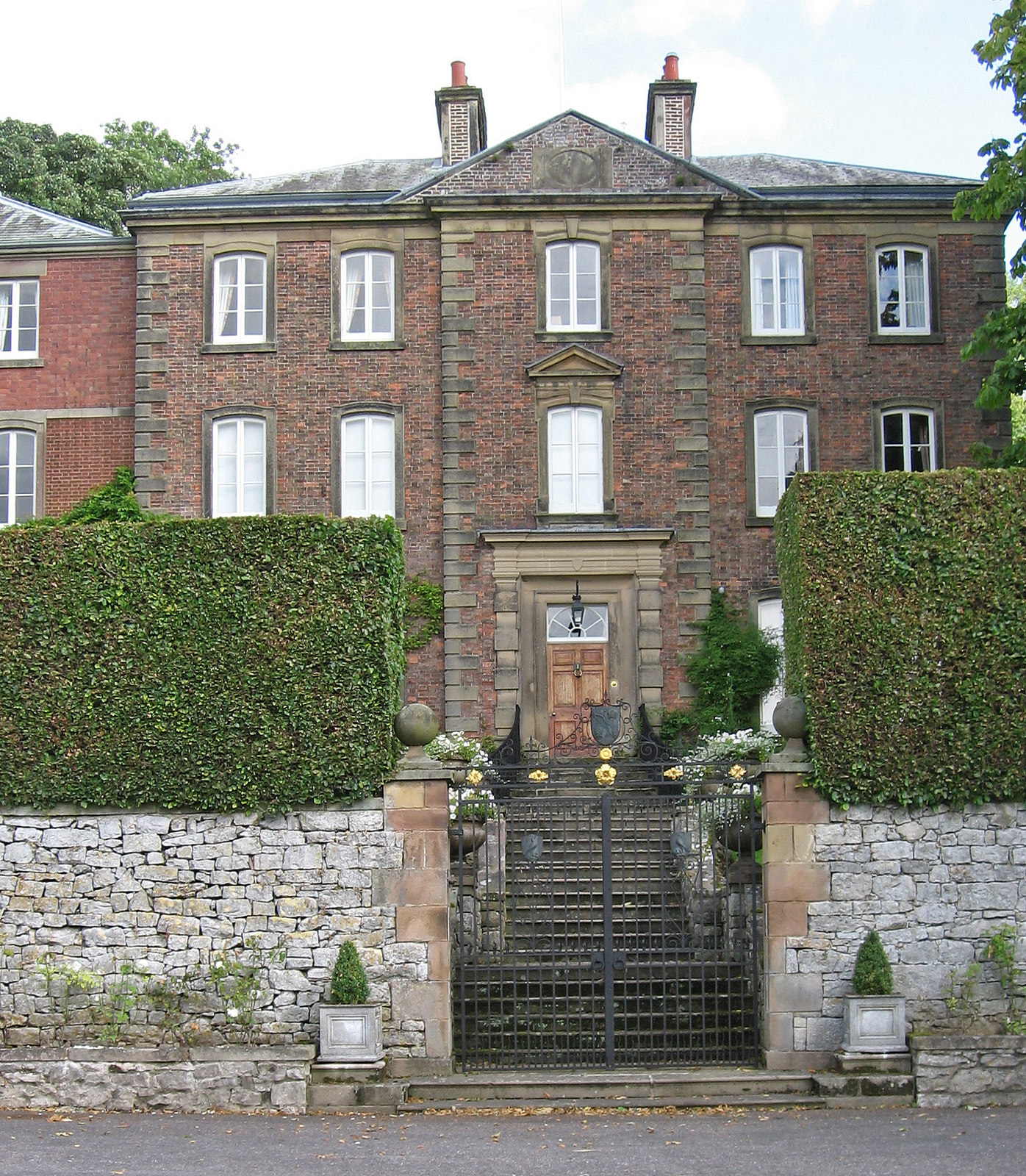

- Location within Derbyshire

General information
- Location: Parwich, England
- Year built: 1747

Design and construction
- Designations

Listed Building – Grade II*
- Official name: The Hall
- Designated: 25 January 1951
- Reference no.: 1281585

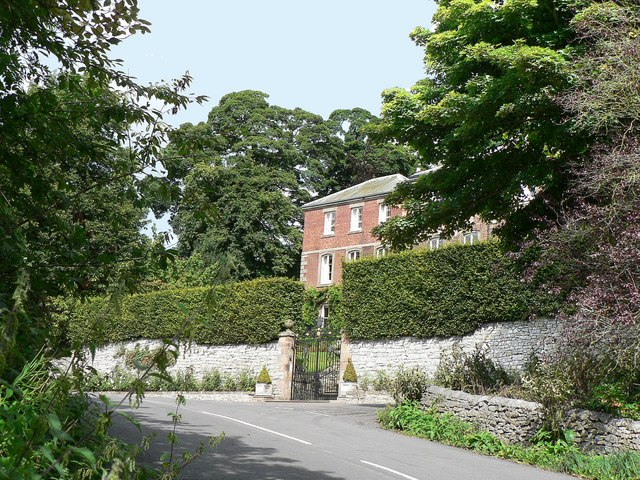
Parwich Hall

Parwich Hall is a privately owned 18th-century mansion house at Parwich, near Ashbourne, Derbyshire Dales. It is a Grade II* listed building.

The Manor of Parwich was owned by the Cockaynes of Ashbourne until they sold it in about 1608 to Thomas Levinge of Norfolk. His great grandson, Richard Levinge, was Speaker of the Irish House of Commons and became the first of the Levinge Baronets.

His son the second Baronet replaced the old manor house with the present brick and limestone mansion house in 1747. The entrance front has three storeys and five bays, symmetrical around the slightly advanced and pedimented central bay. A three-bayed service wing was added to the west in 1905 and raised to three storeys in 1930.

The Levinge family seat was moved to Westmeath in Ireland and the house was let out and in 1814 was sold to William Evans| of Allestree Hall. During part of the time of Evans' ownership the house was occupied by the vicar Rev Carr, a relative of Evans. After the death of Sir Thomas Evans in 1892, another clerical descendant, Rev Claud Lewis, had the use of the house.

The house was sold in 1915 and again in 1931 when it was acquired by the Inglefield (later Crompton-Inglefield) family. John Frederick Crompton-Inglefield was High Sheriff of Derbyshire in 1938.

It later became the home of the Shields family.

== See also ==
- Grade II* listed buildings in Derbyshire Dales
- Listed buildings in Parwich
