= Listed buildings in Newton Grange, Derbyshire =

Newton Grange is a civil parish in the Derbyshire Dales district of Derbyshire, England. The parish contains four listed buildings that are recorded in the National Heritage List for England. All the listed buildings are designated at Grade II, the lowest of the three grades, which is applied to "buildings of national importance and special interest". The parish is almost entirely rural and the listed buildings consist of two farmhouses, a former packhorse bridge and a milepost.

== Buildings ==
Name and location	Photograph	Date	Notes
Hanson Grange; 53.08132°N 1.78148°W		Late 16th century	The farmhouse is in limestone with gritstone dressings, quoins, a string course, and a slate roof, hipped at one end, and elsewhere are two coped gables with moulded kneelers. There are two storeys and a T-shaped plan. The central doorway has a semicircular head with imposts and a keystone. On the front are sash windows, elsewhere are mullioned and transomed windows, some windows are blocked, and some have hood moulds.
Viator's Bridge; 53.08904°N 1.79377°W		17th century (or earlier)	A former packhorse bridge over the River Dove, it is in limestone, and consists of two segmental arches. The bridge has triangular cutwaters, hood moulds, and coped upper walls that are splayed at the ends.
Newton Grange Farmhouse; 53.07850°N 1.75468°W		Mid-18th century	The farmhouse is in limestone with gritstone dressings, quoins and a tile roof. There are two storeys and attics, and a front of five bays, the right bay later and lower. The doorway has a moulded architrave and a bracketed lintel. Some of the windows are sashes, and others are mullioned. The right bay contains a doorway with a quoined surround and a casement window.
Milepost; 53.08430°N 1.76170°W		Early 19th century	The milepost is on the west side of the A515 road. It is in cast iron, with a triangular plan, a sloping top and a curved backplate. On the backplate is the distance to London and "NEWTON GRANGE TOWNSHIP", the sides are inscribed with the distances to Derby, Ashbourne and Buxton, and on the sloping top are the details of the manufacturer.
