= St Peter's Church, Parwich =

St Peter’s Church, Parwich
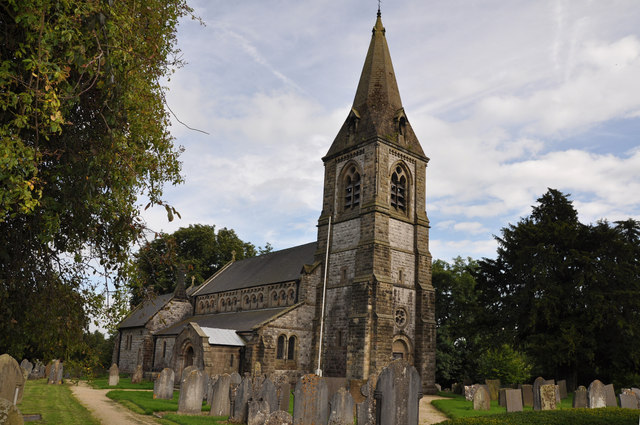
- St Peter’s Church, Parwich
- St Peter’s Church, Parwich
- 53°05′10.38″N 1°43′13.14″W
- Location: Parwich
- Country: England
- Denomination: Church of England
- Website: Peak Seven

History
- Dedication: St Peter

Architecture
- Heritage designation: Grade II* listed
- Architect(s): Henry Isaac Stevens and Frederick J Robinson
- Groundbreaking: 1873
- Completed: 1874

Administration
- Diocese: Diocese of Derby
- Archdeaconry: Derby
- Deanery: Ashbourne
- Parish: Parwich

St Peter’s Church, Parwich is a Grade II* listed parish church in the Church of England in Parwich, Derbyshire.

== History ==
The medieval church was demolished and the current building of Coxbench stone erected between 1872 and 1873 by Henry Isaac Stevens and Frederick Josias Robinson, funded by Sir Thomas William Evans. It was opened on 17 October 1873. The carving was executed by Harry Hems, sculptor of Exeter, and the contractor was W.H. and J. Slater of Derby.

== Parish status ==
The church is a member of the Peak Seven group of churches along with:

- St Michael and All Angels’ Church, Alsop-en-le-Dale
- St Thomas's Church, Biggin
- St Edmund’s Church, Fenny Bentley
- St Giles Church, Hartington
- St Leonard’s Church, Thorpe
- St Mary's Church, Tissington

== Organ ==
The church contains a pipe organ by Abbott and Smith dating from 1873. A specification of the organ can be found on the National Pipe Organ Register.

== See also ==
- Grade II* listed buildings in Derbyshire Dales
- Listed buildings in Parwich
