= Poesía de la soledad y el deseo =

Poetry collection by Alejandro Carrión

Poesía de la soledad y el deseo is a book of poetry by Alejandro Carrión. This collection was published in the Annals of the Central University of Quito as a "separata" with an illustrated cover by Eduardo Kingman, and edited by Alfredo Chávez.

The poem "Dulce niñera rubia de los sueños" began its triumphal chase, eventually included in many anthologies and translated to English by Dudley Fitts. The poem "La espera jubilosa" was transformed into the lyrics of a "Pasillo" which was awarded the first prize of the National Song Competition thanks to the young music teacher Benigno Angel Carrión. Juana de Ibarbourou wrote that Alejandro Carrión "had the innocence of not knowing how great a poet he truly is" and Alberto Hidalgo included him in a list of the greatest poets of America. In this collection Alejandro Carrión distanced himself from the mainstream poetry of the day which dealt heavily on social themes by seeking a new direction re-emphasizing "poetry's eternal themes." The book was heavily criticized by his peers.
