= Cocaine (disambiguation) =

Cocaine is a naturally occurring organic compound, an alkaloid, present in the leaves of the coca plant.

- Cocaine (data page)
- Black cocaine, the disguised smuggled form.
- Crack cocaine, the vaporized freebase.
- Cocaine paste, the crude coca leaf extract.

Cocaine may also refer to:

== Arts and entertainment ==
- Cocaine (1922 film), a British crime film directed by Graham Cutts
- "Cocaine", a 2026 Indian crime thriller film directed by Shravan Tiwari.
- Cocaine: An Unauthorized Biography, a 2002 book by Dominic Streatfeild

=== Music ===
- Cocaine (album), a 2009 album by Z-Ro
- "Cocaine" (song), a 1976 song by J.J. Cale, later recorded by Eric Clapton and Nazareth
- "Cocaine", a poem by Patti Smith in her 1972 book Seventh Heaven
- "Cocaine", a song by Lil Dicky on his 2017 I'm Brain EP
- "Coke'n", a 2002 song by Izzy Stradlin on his album On Down the Road

== Other uses ==
- Cocaine (PaaS), an open source project
- Cocaine (drink), a highly caffeinated energy drink that does not contain the alkaloid cocaine
- List of cocaine analogues, the structurally and functionally analogous chemical molecules derived from or modified to be in accord with the basic form of cocaine
- Tusi (drug), also known as "pink cocaine", which typically does not contain cocaine.

== See also ==
- Cocaína García (1905–1995), Cuban baseball player
- Kokane (born 1969), an American hip hop artist otherwise known as Jerry B. Long Jr.
- Cockayne (disambiguation)
