= Rain (2001 American film) =

2001 film

- Directed by: Katherine Lindberg
- Written by: Katherine Lindberg
- Produced by: Andrés Vicente Gómez; Rainer Kölmel; Jordi Ros
- Starring: Melora Walters; Kris Park; Diane Ladd; Jamey Sheridan
- Cinematography: Vanja Cernjul
- Edited by: Carol Dysinger
- Music by: Clint Mansell
- Release date: 2001
- Language: English

Rain is a 2001 American drama film written and directed by Katherine Lindberg, in her feature film debut. The film premiered at the 58th edition of the Venice Film Festival, in the Venice International Film Critics' Week sidebar.

Principal photography began in October 2000 in Benton County, Iowa. Martin Scorsese served as executive producer.

== Cast ==
- Melora Walters as Ellen Biddle
- Kris Park as Richard Gibson
- Diane Ladd as Audrey Turnquick
- Jamey Sheridan as Sheriff Tom Gibson
- Jo Anderson as Patsy
- Ellen Muth as Jenny
- Adrian Johansson as Eric
- Ezra Buzzington as Officer Ben Patterson
- Tahmus Rounds as Paul Biddle
- Siobhan Fallon Hogan as Clara
