= Desire (2002 film) =

- Theatrical release poster
- Spanish: Deseo
- Directed by: Gerardo Vera
- Screenplay by: Ángeles Caso
- Produced by: Andrés Vicente Gómez
- Starring: Leonor Watling; Leonardo Sbaraglia; Cecilia Roth; Emilio Gutiérrez Caba; Ernesto Alterio; María Vázquez; Jordi Bosch; Gloria Muñoz; Herbert Knaup; Rosa Mª Sardá; Norma Aleandro
- Cinematography: Javier Aguirresarobe
- Edited by: Alejandro Lázaro
- Music by: Stephen Warbeck
- Production company: Lolafilms
- Distributed by: Lolafilms
- Release date: 25 October 2002
- Country: Spain
- Language: Spanish

Desire (Spanish: Deseo), also known as Beyond Desire, is a 2002 Spanish romantic drama film directed by Gerardo Vera from a screenplay by Ángeles Caso which stars Leonor Watling and Leonardo Sbaraglia.

== Plot ==
Set in Madrid in 1945, during the Francoist dictatorship, the plot follows the impossible romance between Elvira and Pablo. Elvira is a humble woman with allegiances to those vanquished in the Spanish Civil War (her father shot dead by the fascists and her husband Julio imprisoned) living with her sister Raquel and her mother. Pablo is an Argentine businessman of German descent and Nazi allegiances who is helping Nazis to flee to Argentina.

== Cast ==
- Leonor Watling as Elvira
- Leonardo Sbaraglia as Pablo
- Cecilia Roth as Alina
- Ernesto Alterio as Julio
- Gloria Muñoz as Lola
- María Vázquez as Raquel
- Jordi Bosch as Velasco
- Emilio Gutiérrez Caba as Rogelio
- Rosa María Sardá as madre de Elvira
- Norma Aleandro as Clarita

== Production ==
The screenplay was penned by novel screenwriter Ángeles Caso. A Lolafilms (Andrés Vicente Gómez) production, the film also had the participation of Antena 3 TV and Vía Digital. The score was authored by Stephen Warbeck, whereas Javier Aguirresarobe worked as cinematographer. The bulk of the footage was shot in Madrid, with some scenes filmed in Galicia.

== Release ==
Distributed by Lolafilms Distribución, the film was theatrically released in Spain on 25 October 2002.

== Reception ==
Jonathan Holland of Variety considered that the "good-looking political romancer" features a "solid script", which "sidesteps the obvious pitfalls, and the luminous screen presence of Leonor Watling suffuses the whole with warmth and tenderness".

Ángel Fernández-Santos of El País considered that despite a good start and a compelling exterior sketch of the characters, the two leads and their romance end up losing steam, "bound by the corset of two inert, empty, dead characters".

== See also ==
- List of Spanish films of 2002
