= Pooley Hall =

Country house in Polesworth, Warwickshire, England

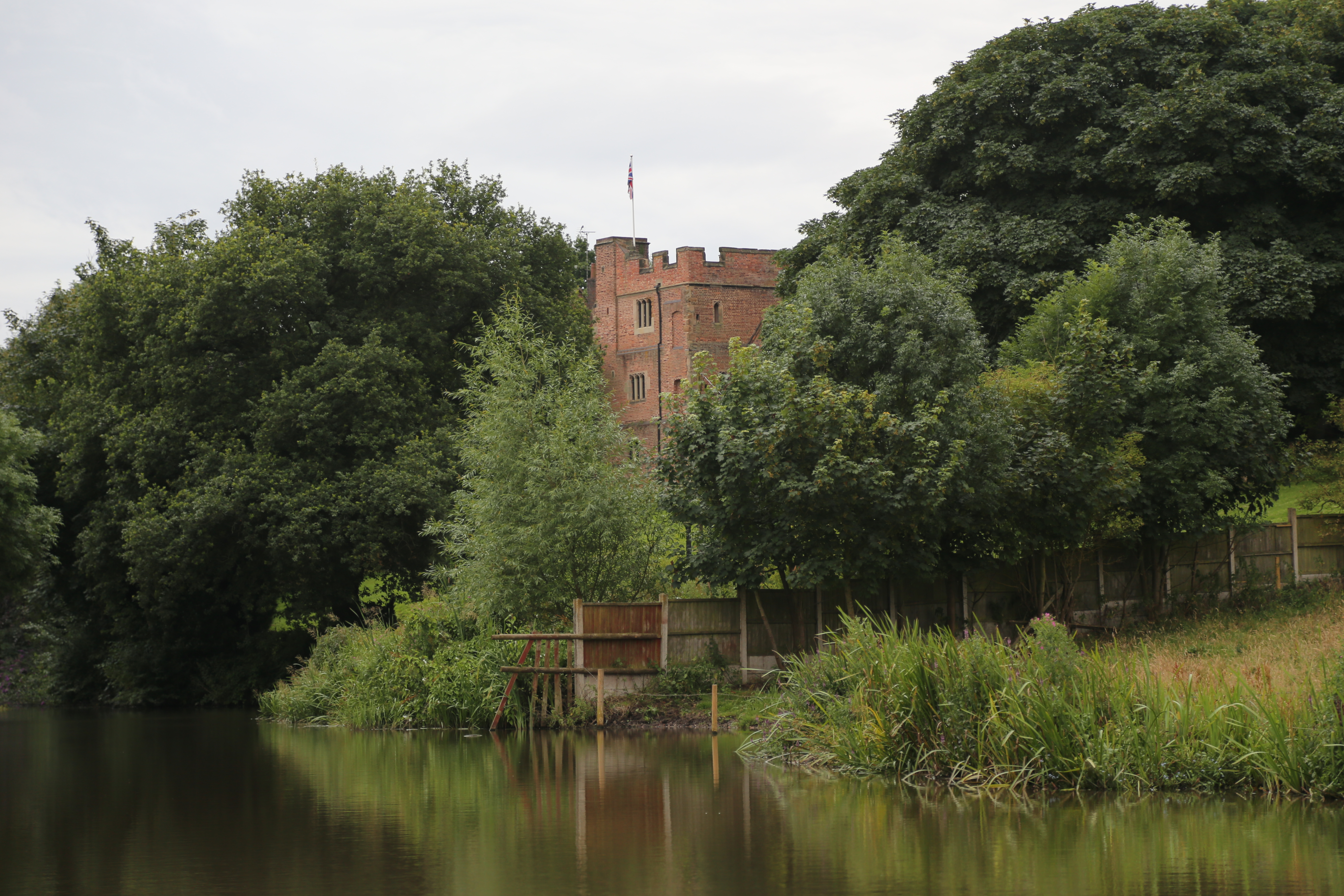
- Pooley Hall seen from the Coventry Canal
- Interactive map of Pooley Hall
- 52.6226°N 1.6190°W
- Location: Polesworth, Warwickshire, England

Listed Building – Grade II*
- Official name: Pooley Hall, attached former chapel and Pooley Hall Farmhouse
- Designated: 23 November 1951
- Reference no.: 1365179

Pooley Hall is a manor house built in 1509 on the outskirts of Polesworth, Warwickshire, England. It is a Grade II* listed building and a private residence.

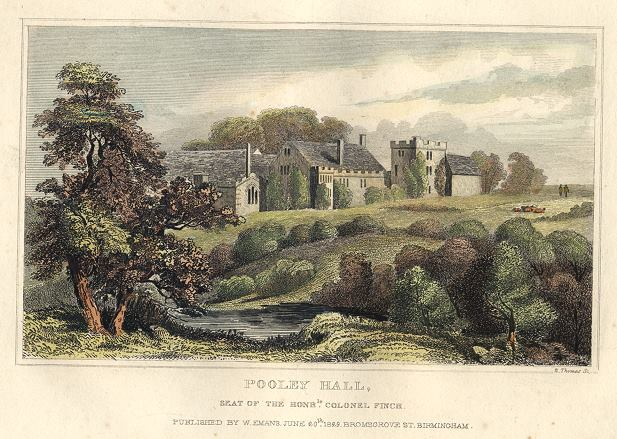
Copper plate engraving of Pooley Hall dated 1829

== The Cockayne family ==
The present hall was built in 1509 by Sir Thomas Cockayne "The Magnificent", who was knighted at the Battle of Tournai by King Henry VIII. It was built on the site of an earlier hall, and was one of the first examples in the country of a castellated brick-built manor house. The house was considerably larger than what it is today and has been repeatedly altered. The original hammer-beam roof of the great hall no longer survives and much of the original house has been demolished.

The Cockayne family split their time between Pooley Hall and their estate at Ashbourne Hall in Derbyshire.

Sir Aston Cockayne, 1st Baronet Cockayne, lived quietly at Pooley Hall for most of the English Interregnum. He was a famous Cavalier and Catholic; during the English Civil War he took the Royalist side, and in 1642 Charles I elevated him to baronet. Sir Aston joined the future Charles II in exile for a time and chose to return to Pooley Hall to "lie low".

Cockayne was responsible for the family's dire financial position. He was famous for his gambling and amassed large debts. Ashbourne Hall was sold within the first baronet's lifetime, and after his death the family were subsequently forced to sell Pooley Hall.

The family moved back to Derbyshire, with several subsequent family members becoming mayors of Derby.

== After the Cockaynes ==
Following the departure of the Cockayne family, Pooley Hall fell into the hands of Charles Jennens of nearby Gopsall Hall and was subsequently inherited by Jennens' god-son The Hon. Charles Finch MP, son of the 3rd Earl of Aylesford.

In 1789, the Coventry Canal was opened. The canal runs through the Pooley Hall estate and passes within 20 metres of the hall, which can be viewed from the tow-path on the opposite side of the canal.

In 1847, a coal mine was sunk on the Pooley Hall estate, not far from the main house. It was completed in 1849 and coal began to be extracted in 1850.

In 1897, the Pooley Hall Colliery was formed. A wharf was constructed on the canal for the colliery, and a branch line was built to connect it to the Trent Valley Line (now part of the West Coast Main Line), that ran through nearby Polesworth.

In 1951, Pooley Hall Colliery joined with nearby Tamworth and Amington collieries to form the North Warwick Colliery.

The colliery eventually closed in 1965, and parts of the house, outbuildings and the colliery buildings had to be demolished due to mining subsidence.

== Today ==
Today 62.5 hectares of the Pooley Hall estate and colliery site has been transformed into the Pooley Country Park, operated by Warwickshire County Council. The park has a visitors' centre and is a popular site for dog walking.

Pooley Hall is once again a private residence. It was for some years the home of the now late Edwin Starr, an American soul and Motown singer who bought the premises in 1985.
