= Aston Cockayne =

English cavalier and writer (1608–1684)

Sir Aston Cockayne
- 1st Baronet Cockayne of Ashbourne
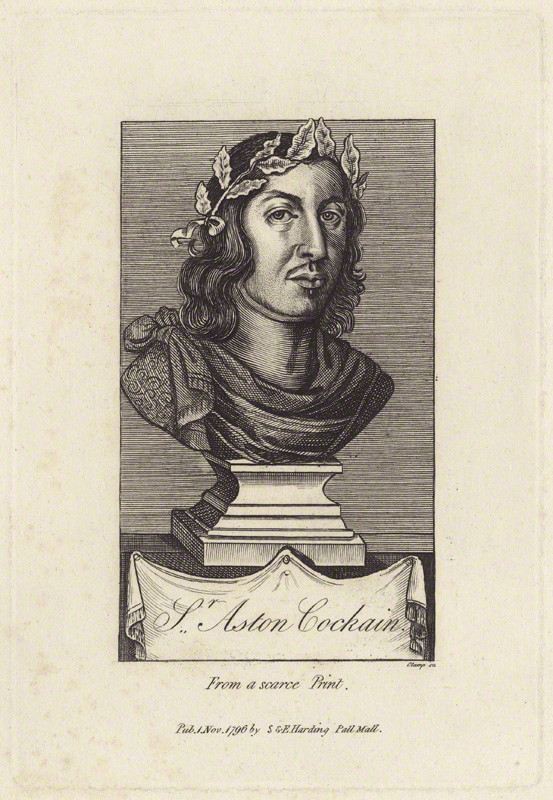
- Engraving
- Baptised: 20 December 1608
- Died: 1684
- Noble family: Cockayne
- Spouse: Mary Kniveton (daughter of Sir Gilbert Kniveton)
- Father: Thomas Cockayne
- Mother: Lady Anne Stanhope (daughter of Sir John Stanhope)
- Occupation: Baronet, Landowner, Cavalier, Poet and Writer.

Sir Aston Cockayne, 1st Baronet (1608–1684) Also spelt Aston Cokaine was, in his day, a well-known Cavalier and a minor literary figure, now best remembered as a friend of Philip Massinger, John Fletcher, Michael Drayton, Richard Brome, Thomas Randolph, and other writers of his generation.

== Biography ==
Cockayne coat of arms

Aston Cockayne was the son of Thomas Cockayne and Ann, the daughter of Sir John Stanhope; Cockayne was born at Elvaston in Derbyshire, and baptised at St Oswalds Church Ashbourne on 20 December 1608. He was educated at Trinity College, Cambridge, the University of Oxford, and at the Inns of Court. Like many other aristocrats of his time, he travelled through Europe in his youth, spending much of 1632 in France and Italy; like a few, he became fluent in their languages, and translated works of literature into English.

Cockayne was a Roman Catholic, and like other Catholics in his country in his era, was active in resistance against the Church of England and the social order that supported it. On 10 January 1641 Charles I elevated him to baronet. During the English Civil War he took the Royalist side. He joined the future Charles II in exile for a time. For much of the English Interregnum he lived on his estate of Pooley Hall, at Polesworth in Warwickshire.

Cockayne was a cousin of the poet Charles Cotton (1630–87), and had connections with Cotton's circle, which included Izaak Walton (1598–1683).

Cockayne held the lands and Lordships of the Manors of Pooley in Warwickshire, and of Ashbourne. But in his later years he suffered financially, He sold Ashbourne Hall to Sir William Boothby (see Boothby baronets), in 1671 to pay creditors, and the family subsequently lost his manor at Pooley Hall in Warwickshire. He died in poverty in Derby .

== Works ==
Cockayne is the author of A Masque at Bretbie, which was performed on Twelfth Night of the Christmas season in 1639, and of Small Poems of Divers Sorts, published in 1658. He also wrote plays: The Obstinate Lady, a comedy (first printed 1657), and Trappolin Suppos'd a Prince, a tragicomedy (printed 1658); and The Tragedy of Ovid (or Ovid's Tragedy) (printed 1662). All three were published in one volume by Francis Kirkman in 1669. His works and his surviving letters constitute still-useful sources of information on the social and cultural affairs of mid-17th-century England.

Cockayne's Small Poems collection of 1658 included verses to Humphrey Moseley, publisher of the 1647 Beaumont and Fletcher folio. In that poem, Cockayne, a friend to both Massinger and Fletcher, noted that Massinger was part-author of many plays in the 1647 Beaumont and Fletcher folio—which eventually inspired a sweeping examination of the authorship problem in the canon of John Fletcher and his various collaborators. He dedicated his tragedy on Ovid, to his cousin Charles Cotton.

== Family ==
He married Mary Kniveton, daughter of Sir Gilbert Kniveton 2nd Baronet, High Sheriff of Derbyshire.

Aston and Mary had 3 children: A son, who died in his father's lifetime, leaving no issue; and two daughters, Mary and Isabella, who were co-heiresses.

Aston's Lordships passed to main Cockayne family line; to Caleb Cockayne the male representative of the family proceeding from the sons of Sir Edward Cockayne, Sir Aston's grandfather.

== Ancestry ==
Ancestors of Aston Cockayne

16. Sir Francis Cockayne, Lord of Ashbourne and Pooley
8. Sir Thomas Cockayne, Lord of Ashbourne and Pooley
17. Lady Dorothy Marrow
4. Sir Edward Cockayne, Lord of Ashbourne and Pooley
18. Sir Humphrey Ferrers, Lord of Tamworth Castle
9. Lady Dorothy Ferrers
19. Lady Margaret Pigot
2. Thomas Cockayne, Lord of Ashbourne and Pooley
20. -
10. Sir Nicholas Ashby, Lord of Willoughby
21. -
5. Lady Jane Ashby
22. –
11. Mary Gedney
23. –
1. Sir Aston Cockayne
24. Sir Michael Stanhope, Lord of Shelford Manor
12. Sir Thomas Stanhope MP, Lord of Shelford Manor
25. Lady Anna Rawson
6. Sir John Stanhope, Lord of Shelford Manor
26. Sir John Port "The Younger", Knight of the Bath
13. Lady Margaret Port
27. Lady Elizabeth De Giffard
3. Lady Anne Stanhope
28. Sir Richard Trentham
14. Sir Thomas Trentham
29. Lady Marie Ireland
7. Lady Katherine Dorothy Trentham
30. Sir William Sneyd
15. Lady Jane Sneyd
31. Lady Margaret Colclough

== Notes ==
Honorary titles
Preceded by Thomas Cockayne	Lord of Ashbourne Hall; 1638–1684	Succeeded by Sir Caleb Cockayne
Preceded by Sir Thomas Cockayne	Lord of Pooley Hall; 1638–1684	Succeeded by Sir Caleb Cockayne
Baronetage of England
Preceded by New Creation	Baronet Cockayne of Ashbourne; 1642–1684	Extinct
