= Listed buildings in Parwich =

Parwich is a civil parish in the Derbyshire Dales district of Derbyshire, England. The parish contains 38 listed buildings that are recorded in the National Heritage List for England. Of these, two are listed at Grade II*, the middle of the three grades, and the others are at Grade II, the lowest grade. The parish contains the village of Parwich and the surrounding countryside. Most of the listed buildings are houses, cottages and associated structures, farmhouses and farm buildings, and the rest consist of a church, a chapel, a school and a telephone kiosk.

== Key ==
Grade	Criteria
II*	Particularly important buildings of more than special interest
II	Buildings of national importance and special interest

== Buildings ==
Name and location	Photograph	Date	Notes	Grade
Knob Hall; 53.08832°N 1.71913°W	—	Mid 17th century	The house, which was restored in 1925, is in limestone with sandstone dressings, quoins, and a tile roof with stone coped gables, moulded kneelers and ball finials. There are two storeys, a double pile plan, and three bays. The central doorway has a chamfered surround, a massive lintel and a hood mould. Above the doorway is a single-light window, the other windows are mullioned with two lights, and all the windows have hood moulds.	II
Shaw House and outbuildings 53.08694°N 1.72246°W		17th century	A low cottage with outbuildings in limestone with sandstone dressings, a tile roof, and two storeys. The doorway has a wooden lintel, and the windows are mullioned. Attached on the left are outbuildings that contain two doorways, one with a massive lintel and jambs, the other with a quoined surround and a lintel, and between them is a small opening with a stone lintel. Above is a square opening with a quoined surround.	II
Shaw Lane Cottage; 53.08699°N 1.72233°W		17th century	The cottage is in limestone with sandstone dressings, a tile roof, and two low storeys. The doorway to the left has a wooden lintel, and most of the windows have chamfered surrounds.	II
Slate House; 53.08970°N 1.72442°W	—	17th century	The house is in limestone with sandstone dressings, a tile roof, and two storeys. The doorway has a segmental arch, some windows are mullioned, and other are casements, some with segmental heads. On the front is an outshut containing a casement window and with a gabled dormer above. aIn the north gable end are two small square windows with chamfered surrounds, one with a date and the other with initials.	II
Outbuilding north of The Fold; 53.08651°N 1.72242°W	—	17th century	A pair of cottages, later used as an outbuilding, it is in limestone with sandstone dressings, quoins, and a stone slate roof with stone coped gables and moulded kneelers. There are two storeys, in the centre are mullioned windows, and outside these are doorways with quoined surrounds and stone lintels.	II
Parwich Hall; 53.08833°N 1.72323°W		c. 1747	A large house in limestone and red brick with sandstone dressings, hipped slate roofs, three storeys and a basement. The main block has a front of five bays, the middle bay projecting under a pedimented gable, quoins, and a moulded eaves cornice. In the centre, steps with wrought iron railings lead up to a doorway with a moulded surround, coving, rusticated pilasters, a traceried fanlight, and a cornice. The basement contains mullioned windows, and the windows in the upper floors have segmental heads, the window over the doorway with a pediment. To the left is a three-bay service wing with sash windows in the ground floor and casements above. At the rear are two gables, and irregular windows, including a tall round-arched sash window with a moulded surround.	II*
Church Gate House and Church Cottage; 53.08621°N 1.72100°W		Mid 18th century	A house and outbuildings converted into a house and a cottage, in limestone with sandstone dressings, and a tile roof with stone coped gables. The house on the right has three storeys, two bays, a central doorway and two-light mullioned windows. To the left is a cottage with two storeys and two bays, and a single-storey bay to the left, containing a doorway and single-light windows.	II
Fernlea; 53.08751°N 1.72259°W	—	18th century	The house is in limestone with sandstone dressings, quoins, and a tile roof with stone coped gables. There are three storeys and three bays. The central doorway has a quoined surround, the outer bays contain two-light mullioned windows with casements, and above the doorway is a three-light window with a single-light window below, forming a T-shape.	II
House and wall southwest of Fernlea; 53.08745°N 1.72277°W		Mid 18th century	The house is in limestone with sandstone dressings, and a tile roof with stone coped gables and kneelers. There are three storeys and two bays. In the centre is a gabled porch, the lower two floors contain two-light mullioned windows, and in the top floor is a three-light mullioned window. The front garden is enclosed by a limestone wall.	II
Stabling and cottage opposite Parwich Hall; 53.08795°N 1.72374°W	—	Mid 18th century	The stables and attached cottage are in limestone with sandstone dressings, quoins, and a tile roof. There are two storeys and eight bays. The middle two bays have a gable, and contain two carriage arches with casement windows above, and pilasters rising to a cornice. To the right is a full height carriage arch, and elsewhere are doorways, and windows, some mullioned.	II
The Fold; 53.08639°N 1.72249°W	—	Mid 18th century	The house is in limestone with sandstone dressings, quoins, and a tile roof with stone coped gables and moulded kneelers. There is an irregular L-shaped plan, consisting of a three-storey main range and a two-storey rear wing. The south front has three bays, and contains a central staircase window with a pointed head and two transoms, to its left is a French window, and the other windows have two lights. In the east front is a doorway with a moulded surround, and sash windows, those in the ground floor with hood moulds.	II
Townhead House; 53.09104°N 1.72521°W	—	Mid 18th century	The house is in limestone with sandstone dressings, quoins, and a roof of tile and slate with stone coped gables and plain kneelers. There are three storeys, and an L-shaped plan, with a front of three bays. The central doorway has a stone lintel and jambs, above it is a staircase window with two transoms, and the other windows are mullioned.	II
Wheatsheaf Cottage and Hallgates Cottage; 53.08821°N 1.72369°W	—	Mid 18th century	A pair of cottages in limestone with sandstone dressings, a tile roof, and two storeys. Hallgates Cottage has three bays and a string course. The central doorway has a stone lintel, above it is a blocked single-light window with a chamfered surround, and in the outer bays are three-light mullioned windows. Wheatsheaf Cottage on the left is lower, it has one bay, and contains a doorway and two-light mullioned windows.	II
Flaxdale House, outbuildings, wall and gate piers 53.08680°N 1.72158°W		1756	The house is in limestone with sandstone dressings, chamfered quoins, a concave eaves band, and a tile roof with stone coped gables and moulded kneelers. There are three storeys and two bays. The central doorway has a quoined surround and a bracketed hood, and the windows are mullioned with two lights and moulded surrounds. At the top of the house is a panel with an incised oval, initials and the date. Single-storey outbuildings are attached to the east, and the front garden is enclosedd by walls with sandstone gate piers.	II
Cottage Farmhouse; 53.12812°N 1.71519°W	—	1759	The farmhouse is in limestone with sandstone dressings, rusticated quoins, and a tile roof with stone coped gables and moulded kneelers. There are two storeys and two bays. The central doorway has a tall lintel with a keystone and a hood mould, above which is a moulded dated and initialled panel. The windows are mullioned and contain casements.	II
Brook House and Brook Cottage; 53.08571°N 1.71997°W	—	Late 18th century	A house and a cottage under a continuous roof, in limestone with sandstone dressings and a tile roof. There are two storeys, the house on the left with four bays, incorporating a former outbuilding on the left, and the cottage to the right with two bays. The house has a doorway with a massive quoined surround and a deep lintel, and the windows are mullioned with two casements. The cottage has a doorway with a segmental head and voussoirs, and the windows have shallow brick arched heads.	II
Church Farmhouse; 53.08773°N 1.71834°W	—	Late 18th century	The farmhouse is in limestone with sandstone dressings and a roof of tile and stone slate. There are two storeys and three bays. The central doorway has a massive lintel and a hood mould, and the windows are mullioned with two lights.	II
Creamery Lane Cottages; 53.08780°N 1.71878°W	—	Late 18th century	Two cottages in limestone with sandstone dressings, a tile roof and two storeys. On the front are doorways with lintels, and windows, some of which have single lights, and the others are mullioned with two lights.	II
Crown House and outbuilding 53.08954°N 1.72412°W	—	Late 18th century	The house is in limestone with sandstone dressings and a tile roof. There are two storeys and three bays. The central doorway has a quoined surround, above it is a single-light window, and the other windows are mullioned with two lights. To the left is a single-storey outbuilding containing a garage door.	II
Flatts Stile Farmhouse; 53.08590°N 1.72302°W		Late 18th century	The farmhouse is in limestone with sandstone dressings, quoins, and a tile roof with stone coped gables and plain kneelers. There is an L-shaped plan, consisting of a main range of three storeys and three bays, and a lower rear wing with two storeys. The central doorway has a quoined surround and a rectangular fanlight, in the floors above it are single-light windows, and the other windows are mullioned with two lights.	II
Barn north of Flatts Stile Farmhouse; 53.08604°N 1.72290°W	—	Late 18th century	The barn is in limestone with sandstone dressings, a tile roof with stone coped gables and plain kneelers, and two storeys. The gable ends contain arrow slit vents and irregular projecting stones.	II
Gardeners Cottage; 53.08868°N 1.71990°W	—	Late 18th century	The cottage is in limestone with sandstone dressings, a tile roof, and two storeys. The central doorway has a quoined surround and a lintel, and the windows are mullioned with two lights.	II
Jasmine Cottage and The Cottage; 53.08672°N 1.72127°W		Late 18th century	A pair of cottages in limestone with gritstone dressings, quoins, and a tile roof with stone coped gables and plain kneelers. There are two storeys, and on the front is a doorway with pediment-shaped moulding. The windows are mullioned, and contain small-paned casements.	II
Lower Gotham Farmhouse, barns, wall and railings 53.12327°N 1.71695°W	—	Late 18th century	The farmhouse is in limestone, partly rendered, with gritstone dressings and a tile roof. There are two storeys and five bays. On the front are three doorways and mullioned windows. On each side are barns, and the house has a garden wall with railings.	II
Orchard View; 53.08662°N 1.71809°W	—	Late 18th century	A house in limestone with sandstone dressings and a tile roof. There are two storeys and three bays. On the front is a gabled porch, and the windows are mullioned with two lights.	II
The Rookery; 53.08923°N 1.72386°W	—	Late 18th century	The house is in limestone with sandstone dressings and a tile roof. There are two storeys and three bays. On the front is a lattice work porch and a doorway, the windows in the left two bays are mullioned, and in the later right bay are casement windows.	II
Willow Cottage and wall 53.08669°N 1.72106°W	—	Late 18th century	The house is limestone with gritstone dressings, quoins, a tile roof, and two storeys. The central doorway has stone jambs and a lintel, and the windows are mullioned with two casements. The front garden is enclosed by a drystone wall.	II
Hallcliff House and wall 53.08667°N 1.72097°W	—	1776	A house in limestone with sandstone dressings, quoins, and a tile roof with stone coped gables and moulded kneelers. It is in two and three storeys. The doorway has a hood mould, in the top floor is a Venetian window, and the other windows are mullioned. The front garden is enclosed by a stone wall.	II
Brentwood; 53.08688°N 1.72220°W		Early 19th century	A house in limestone with sandstone dressings, quoins, and a tile roof with stone coped gables and plain kneelers. There are two storeys and two bays, and a single-storey extension to the left under a catslide roof. The extension contains a shop window and a doorway on the side. To its right is a doorway and a timber openwork gabled porch, and the windows are mullioned with two lights.	II
Parwich Lees; 53.08821°N 1.74573°W		Early 19th century	A house in limestone with gritstone dressings, quoins, a roof of tile and slate, two storeys and attics. The south front is rendered, and has three bays, and a central doorway with pilasters and an entablature. This is flanked by canted bay windows, and above are sash windows with moulded architraves, the outer windows with keystones, and the sills linked by a band. The east front contains mullioned and transomed windows with moulded keystones, and to the north is a bellcote dated 1858.	II
Former Post Office, wall, gate piers and railings 53.08731°N 1.72244°W		Early 19th century	A house in limestone with sandstone dressings, and a tile roof. There are two storeys, three bays, and a single-storey single-bay extension on the right. The central doorway has stone jambs, a lintel and a hood mould, and the windows are sashes. In front of the garden is a low wall with gate piers and iron railings.	II
Methodist Chapel, wall and railings 53.08642°N 1.72426°W		1847	The chapel is in limestone with sandstone dressings, quoins, and a slate roof with stone coped gables and plain kneelers. The entrance front has a gabled porch and a doorway with a segmental arch, flanked by round-arched windows with keystones containing Gothic glazing. Above the doorway is an inscribed and dated foundation stone. The front area is enclosed by a stone retaining wall with flat copings and iron railings.	II
Foufinside Farmhouse; 53.09178°N 1.72792°W	—	Mid 19th century	The farmhouse is in limestone with gritstone dressings, and a tile roof with stone coped gables and kneelers. There are two storeys and attics. The central doorway has a massive quoined surround and lintel. The windows in the lower two floors are mullioned and contain two top-hung casements, and in the attic is a four-light mullioned window.	II
School, house and wall 53.08753°N 1.72383°W		1861	The school and the former master's house, now incorporated in the school, are in limestone with sandstone dressings, and a tile roof with stone coped gables. There is a V-shaped plan, the school in the west wing has a single storey and a cross-wing, the former house in the north wing has one storey and an attic, and in the angle is a gabled porch over which is a bell and clock turret with a pyramidal roof. Enclosing the area at the front of the school is a stone retaining wall with railings, and steps in the angle.	II
St Peter's Church; 53.08605°N 1.72033°W		1872–73	The church, designed by Stevens and Robinson in Norman style incorporating 12th-century material, is built in limestone with sandstone dressings and slate roofs. It consists of a nave with a clerestory, north and south aisles, a north porch, a chancel with a south aisle and a north vestry, and a west steeple. The steeple has a tower with four stages and angle buttresses linked at the top by arched corbel tables. On the west front is a re-used round-arched 12th-century doorway that has nook shafts with beakhead decoration, a single order of chevrons, and a tympanum carved with animal motifs. Above it is a hood mould and a wheel window, the bell openings have two lights, and the tower is surmounted by a broach spire with two tiers of lucarnes.	II*
Garden terraces, walls and gates, Parwich Hall; 53.08874°N 1.72195°W	—	c. 1905	The garden features were designed by Walter Tapper, and are in limestone with gritstone dressings. Along the terraces and the road are drystone walls with flat copings, the gate piers have ball finials, and the gates are in wrought iron.	II
Summerhouse, Parwich Hall; 53.08899°N 1.72203°W	—	c. 1905	The summerhouse in the grounds of the hall was designed by Walter Tapper. It is in limestone with gritstone dressings, and has a pyramidal tile roof. There is a single storey, and on the west front is a doorway and a mullioned window.	II
Telephone kiosk 53.08709°N 1.72218°W		1935	The K6 type telephone kiosk was designed by Giles Gilbert Scott. Constructed in cast iron with a square plan and a dome, it has three unperforated crowns in the top panels.	II
