= Fenny Bentley =

Village in Derbyshire, England

Coordinates: 53.04783°N 1.73465°W

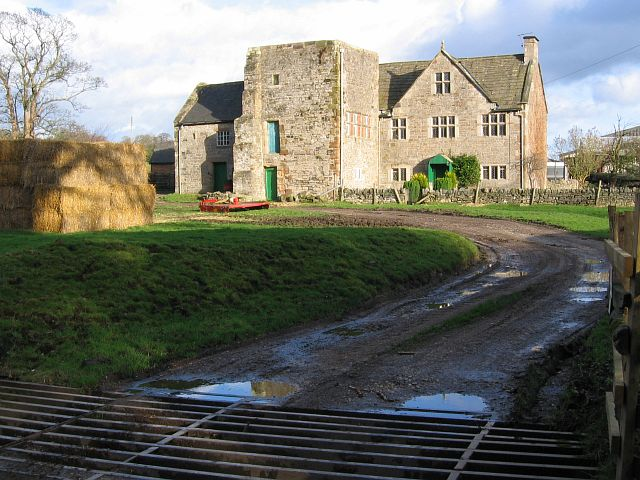
- Cherry Orchard Farm was once the family home of the Beresfords and known as Bentley Hall. The tower is 15th century.

- Location within Derbyshire
- Population: 305 (2009)
- OS grid reference: SK178501
  - London: 145 miles.
- Civil parish: Fenny Bentley
- District: Derbyshire Dales
- Shire county: Derbyshire
- Region: East Midlands
- Country: England
- Sovereign state: United Kingdom
- Post town: Ashbourne
- Postcode district: DE6
- Dialling code: 01335
- Police: Derbyshire
- Fire: Derbyshire
- Ambulance: East Midlands
- UK Parliament: Derbyshire Dales

Fenny Bentley is a small village and civil parish located close to Dovedale in the Derbyshire Dales district of Derbyshire, England. The population in 2009 was 305 reducing to 183 at the 2011 Census. It lies two miles north of Ashbourne, on the A515 Buxton to Ashbourne Road. It is one of the most southerly villages in the Peak District.

== History ==
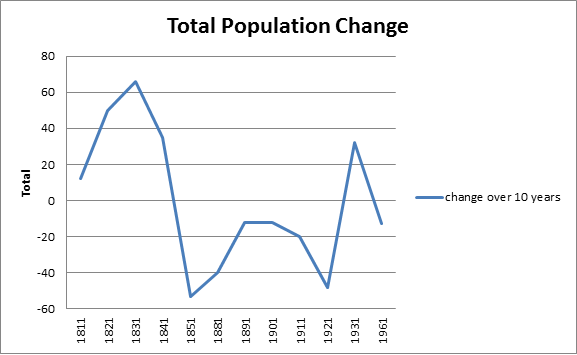
Population change in Fenny Bentley

Records show that a settlement has existed at Fenny Bentley since being mentioned in The Domesday Book in 1086, when it was known as Benedlege. Early records of The Church of St. Edmund date back as far as 1240, with much of the available historical data that provides information on the village being associated with the church and the information recorded here. The introduction of the census in the United Kingdom in 1801 means that more consistent information on the parish and how it has developed over time is now available. The population of the village has fluctuated slightly since the 19th century, with a peak in 1841 of 343 people living there.

=== St Edmund's Church ===
Located in the centre of the village, St Edmunds is an Anglican church that has been heavily restored since being built. Early records of The Church of St. Edmund date back as far as 1240, which show that Fenny Bentley was one of six chapelries attached to St Oswald's Church, Ashbourne The north aisle was added in 1850, and in 1864, the spire was added to the original tower. It has seating for around 200 people. Some interesting features of the building are its 16th-century traceried screens as well as the alabaster Beresford tomb located there, which holds the bodies of Sir Thomas Beresford, his wife Agnes and their 21 children, all shrouded.

=== Beresford family name ===
Sir Thomas Beresford, who died in 1473, is buried with his family in St Edmunds Church in the village. They were from a prolific family who lived in the area for generations, and owned much of the property and land there. It is suggested that everyone with the surname Beresford is descended from them and there are still reunions held in Fenny Bentley every spring as it is now the meeting place for the Beresford Family Society.

==== Cherry Orchard Farm ====
Cherry Orchard farm is located opposite St Edmunds Church. Previously known as Bentley Hall, it was once the home of the Beresford Family and at the end of the 14th and beginning of the 15th century it was the home of Thomas Beresford as well as his wife and children.

=== Tattersall Cotton Mill ===
Many of the residents of Fenny Bentley in the past worked at Tattersell Cotton Mill, which was located in Woodeaves, a nearby hamlet approximately 1 mile from Fenny Bentley. The mill was built in 1784 by John Cooper, and was originally powered by the Bentley Brook. Around 100 people were employed there, mainly for the Nottingham lace and cotton trade. In 1886, the mill was brought by Manchester cotton merchant Cornelius Tattersell, father of John Lincoln Tattersall who was also employed there; he established a home in nearby village Thorpe, Derbyshire with his wife Lizzie Harland in 1893. In 1908, the mill ceased production but the warehouse was taken over in 1910 by William Nuttall. Originally from Melton Mowbray, he was the brother of John Nuttall, who was the owner of the Harlington Cheese Factory. Stilton cheese was produced there until 1930.

On the outskirts of the village is the Bentley Brook Inn, a traditional busy country Inn with a popular wedding function room and garden.

== Geography ==
Fenny Bentley lies on the southern edge of the Peak District, within the Derbyshire Dales, East Midlands. Footpaths lead directly to the Tissington trail and through Thorpe to Dovedale. It lies approximately 3 miles from Dovedale, a Dale that features riverside paths accessible for walkers. Dovedale is centred on the River Dove in a Limestone valley. The site is owned by the National Trust, and the area is very popular with tourists, with the Peak District claiming to be the second most visited National Park in the world with 22 million visitors per year, behind Mount Fuji National Park in Japan. Tourism plays an important role for the few businesses that have been established in Fenny Bentley, such as the Coach and Horses inn which lies on the main route through the village, appealing to visitors to the area who may pass through on the A515 Buxton to Ashbourne Road.

Much of the agricultural land around Fenny Bentley is pasture, the growing of crops being rare. It is suggested that arable farming was never widely practised in the area although this has suggestion has been challenged, with fossilised traces of ridge and furrow being discovered beneath grass covered meadows, in fields around Fenny Bentley, Thorpe and Tissington.

The Peak District Boundary Walk runs through the village, which lies just inside the Peak District National Park.

=== Demography ===
Early census reports show that many of the people living in Fenny Bentley in the past worked locally. The majority of males worked in agricultural professions in the area, whilst the majority of females were distributed between having no known profession or being employed in the textiles industry, most likely to be the Tattersall Cotton Mill and other similar locations within the region.

More recently, the population of Fenny Bentley is seen as generally a little older, with a mix of families with older children and retired households. The income in this area is generally above average and residents typically work in managerial positions, are well educated and are likely to have paid off their mortgages. The average house price in the area has decreased more recently, with the average price for a detached house in 2010 being £344,290, compared to an average in the first quarter of 2012 of just £267,833.

=== Transport ===
Fenny Bentley has a bus service to Ashbourne and Buxton where onward connections can be made to meet rail services from Derby and Manchester. Connections in Ashbourne are available to Matlock, Bakewell, Uttoxeter and Lichfield. The village is within easy reach by road, of cities such as Derby and Sheffield. There are alternative transport connections at Matlock Bath railway station is located 8.98 miles away, whilst East Midlands Airport is 22.98 miles from the village. The nearest port is located in Liverpool, approximately 57 miles from Fenny Bentley.

== See also ==
- Listed buildings in Fenny Bentley
