= Listed buildings in Fenny Bentley =

Fenny Bentley is a civil parish in the Derbyshire Dales district of Derbyshire, England. The parish contains four listed buildings that are recorded in the National Heritage List for England. Of these, two are listed at Grade II*, the middle of the three grades, and the others are at Grade II, the lowest grade. The parish contains the village of Fenny Bentley and the surrounding area, and the listed buildings consist of a church, a farmhouse with a former pele tower, and two mile posts.

== Key ==
Grade	Criteria
II*	Particularly important buildings of more than special interest
II	Buildings of national importance and special interest

== Buildings ==
Name and location	Photograph	Date	Notes	Grade
St Edmund's Church; 53.04871°N 1.74103°W		c. 1300	The church has been altered and extended through the centuries, including the north aisle and roof in 1846–49, the tower was rebuilt in 1865, and a northeast chapel was added in 1882–83. The church is built in limestone with sandstone dressings and tile roofs, and consists of a nave, a north aisle, a south porch, a chancel with a north aisle, and a west steeple. The steeple has a tower with three stages, angle buttresses, the bottom stage with a two-light window in the west front, an arrow slit window and a sundial on the south front and a lean-to on the north. Above is a string course, two-light bell openings, a plain parapet, and a recessed broach spire with two tiers of lucarnes.	II*
Cherry Orchard Farmhouse and outbuildings 53.04866°N 1.73893°W		15th century (probable)	A pele tower, which was extended in the 17th century and converted into a farmhouse, in limestone with sandstone dressings. The tower is square with three storeys, quoins, and a large buttress with six set-offs at the northwest corner. On the south front are doorways in the ground and middle floors, and on the west front is a two-light mullioned window, and a partly blocked seven-light mullioned and transomed window. The farmhouse has a tile roof with coped gables and plain kneelers. There are two storeys and an attic, and three bays. On the front is a gable, a central porch and windows that are mullioned or mullioned and transomed. Two-storey outbuildings are attached to the north.	II*
Mile post opposite Bentley Brook Hotel; 53.04396°N 1.73754°W		Early 19th century	The milepost on the west side of the A515 road is in cast iron. It has a triangular plan, and a sloping top rising to a straight back with curved top. The sloping top is inscribed "BENTLEY PARISH", The distances to London and Derby are inscribed on the back, and on the sides are the distances to Ashbourne and Buxton.	II
Mile post north of old railway bridge 53.05780°N 1.74310°W		Early 19th century	The milepost on the west side of the A515 road is in cast iron. It has a triangular plan, and a sloping top rising to a straight back with curved top. The sloping top is inscribed "BENTLEY PARISH", The distances to London and Derby are inscribed on the back, and on the sides are the distances to Ashbourne and Buxton.	II
