= Cocaine (drink) =

American brand of energy drink

Cocaine Energy Supplement
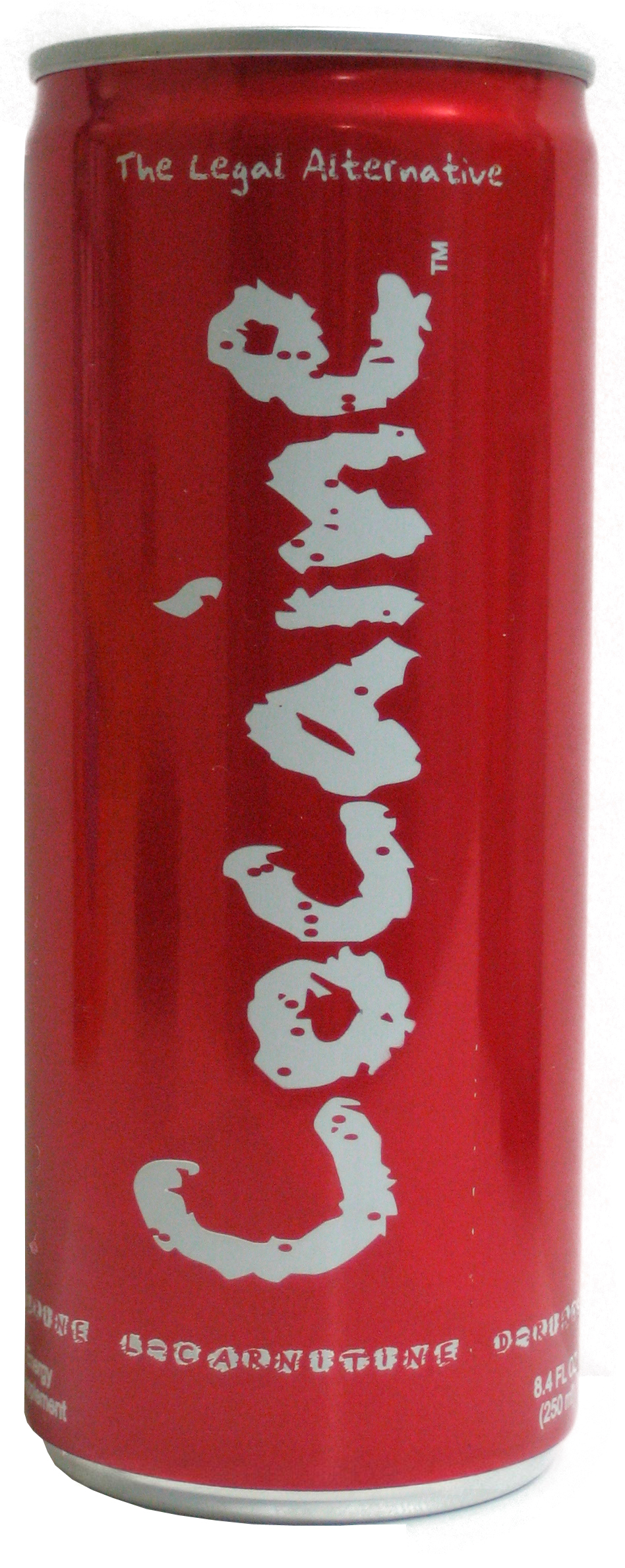
- Type: Energy drink
- Manufacturer: Hype Beverages
- Origin: United States
- Introduced: September 2006
- Flavor: Spicy; Mixed Berry; Black Cinnamon Kola; Peach Mango; Watermelon Ice; Pina Colada; Citrus

Cocaine Energy Supplement, also known as "Cocaine Energy Drink", is a highly caffeinated energy drink distributed by Hype Beverages. The label claims it contains more caffeine than rival energy drinks such as Red Bull and Rockstar, symbolized by three and a half steer heads on the label. Aside from caffeine, it purportedly contains 750 milligrams of taurine, a dietary supplement found in many energy drinks, although it is not known to have any health benefits.

== History ==
Cocaine was created by Jamey Kirby, who used to work as a software executive. Originally, the drink was going to be named "Reboot", but the name was already taken. Instead, the name "Cocaine" was chosen for its potential to be controversial. Kirby founded Redux Beverages in 2006 with his wife Hannah, and launched Cocaine in autumn of that year. According to Jamey Kirby, initial marketing costs merely consisted of sending a case of energy drinks to the New York Post offices. According to the Las Vegas Sun, Kirby made over $1.5 million in sales three months after Cocaine's debut.

== Name controversy ==
While the drink contained no actual cocaine, the product launch attracted criticism from lawmakers and anti-drug organizations, who felt that Cocaine glamorized drug usage to children. That same month, 7-Eleven publicly asked its franchisees to stop selling the energy drink.

In 2007, Cocaine was temporarily pulled from shelves in the United States, after the Food and Drug Administration published a warning letter stating that Cocaine "was illegally marketing the drink as both a street drug alternative and a dietary supplement". The FDA cited statements made on Cocaine's packaging and website as evidence for their claims. In response, Redux Beverages removed the statements from their website, and began working on a new name for the product immediately. At the end of May, 2007, the Redux team decided to change the name to No Name. On 17 June 2007, the drink was redistributed in the U.S. under the new labeling. The Las Vegas Sun reported that online sales of Cocaine had quadrupled two weeks after the FDA's warning letter. In December 2007, the United States District Court for the District of Minnesota ruled against Redux Beverages in a copyright infringement lawsuit pertaining to the No Name branding. Beginning in February 2008, the old Cocaine name was used again.

In addition to the FDA, Cocaine also faced trouble from specific U.S. states that same year. In April 2007, hundreds of cases of Cocaine were seized by the Department of Consumer Protection in Connecticut, which stated that the company had not registered with them, and that drink's labels did not comply with state laws requiring companies to label their drink's water source. That year, attorneys general in Connecticut and Illinois announced that Redux Beverages complied to not market Cocaine in their respective states. In May 2007, the Texas Attorney General filed a lawsuit against Redux Beverages, stating that the drink was being marketed as a legal substitute to actual cocaine.

In 2011, the Coca-Cola Company filed an opposition to Redux Beverages' trademark of Cocaine in Chile, claiming that "the referenced trademark would infringe fair competition". That same year, Redux Beverages released an energy shot called the Cocaine Energy Shot.

The drink is available online and in local beverage stores around the U.S. The beverage is also available in Europe, where it has always been sold as Cocaine Energy Drink rather than "No Name" (as it was briefly sold in the U.S).

== New management and ownership ==
In 2022, Cocaine underwent changes in ownership and management, becoming operated by Hype Beverages. The company introduced sugar-free flavor options such as Citrus, Watermelon Ice, and Pina Colada. These additions reflect an effort to adapt to trends within the energy drink market, particularly the demand for reduced-sugar alternatives.

== Ingredients ==
The ingredients are carbonated water, dextrose, citric acid, taurine, caffeine, natural flavors, sodium citrate, D-ribose, salt, sodium benzoate, inositol, ascorbic acid (vitamin C), sucralose, L-carnitine, potassium sorbate, guarana seed extract, pyridoxine hydrochloride (vitamin B_{6}), cyanocobalamin (vitamin B_{12}), and Red 40.

According to the label, the drink contains 280 milligrams of caffeine.
