= Ashbourne Hall =

Manor house in Ashbourne, Derbyshire, England

Coordinates: 53.0197°N 1.7282°W

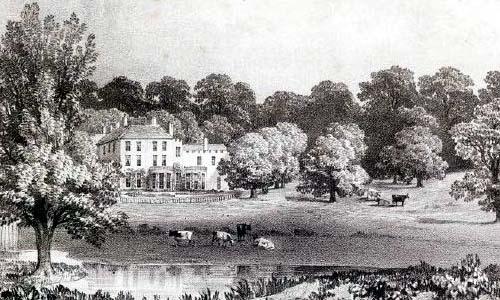
- Ashbourne Hall from its Park (c. 1800)

- Location within Derbyshire

General information
- Architectural style: Georgian
- Location: Ashbourne, Derbyshire, England
- Year built: 18th century
- Owner: Claire Woodroffe and Michael Cottrell

Ashbourne Hall is a Manor house originally built by the Cockayne family in the 13th century in Ashbourne, Derbyshire. The present building is part of a largely repurposed, Georgian-styled hall built in the 18th century.

== The Cockayne family ==
The Cockayne family settled in Ashbourne in the 12th Century as lords of the manor. The Cockayne family's Ashbourne Hall was rebuilt during the reign of Henry VIII in the 15th century. Ashbourne Hall served as their family seat and most of the family were buried in the Cockayne Chapel at nearby Ashbourne Parish Church. The family also owned the nearby manors of Sturston Hall, Bradley and of Pooley hall in Polesworth, Warwickshire. Sir Aston Cockayne, First Baronet Cockayne of Ashbourne, was a cavalier, author and poet. He was friends with Charles I from whom he received his baronetcy for support during the civil war. Sir Aston used the hall as a dower house for his mother, Anne. He lived at his manor of Pooley hall for most of the English Interregnum, joining Charles II in exile for a short time. In 1645 King Charles I stayed at Ashbourne Hall with Lady Cockayne - the Royalist Army of 3000 men camped in the park. Sir Aston gained enormous debts and sold Ashbourne Hall in 1671 to Sir William Boothby in order to pay his creditors.

== The Boothby family ==
Sir William Boothby bought the hall in 1671 and his family lived there until the mid-19th century. The hall was modified when additional land was included for Brooke Boothby which was the same year as the Scots arrived. In 1745 on 3 December, Bonnie Prince Charlie stayed at Ashbourne Hall for the night, proclaiming his father as James III in Ashbourne Market.

Sir Brooke Boothby, 6th Baronet married in 1784 and leased the hall from his father. He began the restoration of Ashbourne Hall using his wife's dowry to renovate the structure, remodel the parkland, purchase rare plants and obtain works of art. Boothby, like his father before him, was extravagant. He purchased from Joseph Wright of Derby two paintings of Dovedale, two views of nearby Matlock, two paintings of bridges in Rome as well as an unusual portrait of himself.

The original hall was partly demolished during the Boothby's time and extended and refaced by the present Georgian structure. The land that Brookby incorporated into the hall's lands meant that a road called Cockayne Avenue had to be closed. It was long after the 6th baronet Sir Brooke Boothby lost his young daughter and died broken hearted, that the road was returned to public use (in 1922).

== Later ==
In 1846, on the death of Sir William Boothby, 9th baronet, the hall was put up for auction in London. Although bidding finished at £27,950 (£1,232,595 today) this was not enough to persuade the owners to sell.

The Hall was sold to Robert Hayston Frank, a solicitor, in 1861. He later became a magistrate and lived there with his family until his death in 1883. His widow sold the property for £48,000. Documented by probate documents for Derbyshire in 1883. Death date is 1 May 1883.

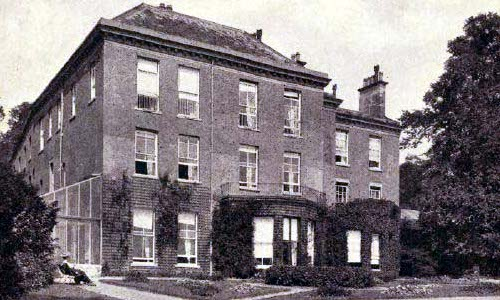
Ashbourne Hall was a hotel around 1900

The House was bought by a solicitor from Ashbourne, John Fox, who within two months had sold the estate off in 46 separate lots. After being briefly owned by a Roman Catholic priest from Ashbourne, the Hall itself was bought by Captain Holland who sold it in 1858.

The hall was used as a hotel around 1902.

It was occupied during the First World War by German prisoners of War. The Ashbourne Red Cross also used it. By 1920 the hall was converted into flats and during the Second World War, evacuees were living in a part of it. Around the year 1947 the west block was reduced from three stories to two and the building split into two.

== Today ==
The hall is owned by Claire Woodroffe and Michael Cottrell, Ashbourne based family who are property investors and have tourism businesses in the area. A section of the hall is now home to the Ashbourne Freemasons and to Betty's Sewing Box and Tea rooms. The parkland opposite Ashbourne Hall was created for the Cockayne Family in the early Tudor period, for hunting. It was developed in the late 18th century by the Boothbys into an ornamental park of around 40 acres. Today, what little remains of the Park land is used as a public park, recreation fields and the site of the Ashbourne War Memorial Gates.

== See also ==
Media related to Ashbourne Hall at Wikimedia Commons

- Boothby baronets
- Cockayne baronets
