= Alsop en le Dale =

Village in Derbyshire, England

Coordinates: 53.0933°N 1.7618°W

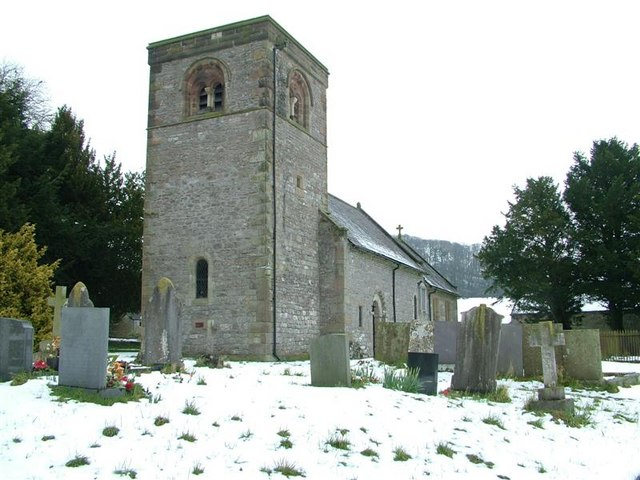
- The church at Alsop en le Dale

- Location within Derbyshire
- OS grid reference: SK160551
- Civil parish: Eaton and Alsop
- District: Derbyshire Dales
- Shire county: Derbyshire
- Region: East Midlands
- Country: England
- Sovereign state: United Kingdom
- Post town: Ashbourne
- Postcode district: DE6
- Police: Derbyshire
- Fire: Derbyshire
- Ambulance: East Midlands
- UK Parliament: Derbyshire Dales

Alsop en le Dale is a village in Derbyshire, England about 5 miles (8.0 km) north of Ashbourne close to the Staffordshire border, and a mile from Dovedale, a popular tourist location within the Peak District national park. It is within the civil parish of Eaton and Alsop.

== Toponymy ==
The derivation of “Alsop en le Dale” is the product of a two-stage process: “Alsop” originates from “Ælli’s little valley” (Old English hop), whilst en le Dale is from the Old French for “in the” and the Old English dœl (valley).

== History ==
Comprising a few cottages and scattered farms, the village was mentioned in the Domesday Book under Derbyshire in the lands belonging to the king. The book, which was written in 1086, said:

In Parwich are two carucates of land to the geld. There is land for two ploughs. It is waste. Kolli holds it of the king and he has three villans with two bordars with three ploughs. There are twelve acres of meadow. To this manor belong berewicks of Alsop-en-le-Dale, Hanson Grange and Cold Eaton. There are 2 carucates of land to the geld. There is land for two ploughs. It is waste.

After the Norman Conquest, Henry de Ferrers, one of William the Conqueror's generals, was granted land in Derbyshire. He in turn offered the township of Alsop-le-Dale to one of his officers Gamellus who became known as Gamellus de Alsop. The Alsop family owned the estate of Alsop-en-le-Dale from the 12th century to the late 17th century, when Anthony Alsop's creditors forced the sale of the estate to meet his debts, some of which was passed to Sir Phillip Gell. During the 18th century, the Allsopps of Derby and Worcester were proprietors of Samuel Allsopp & Sons, a Burton-based brewery, and Henry Allsopp, 1st Baron Hindlip, claimed that they were descended from the Alsops. While a connection between Anthony Alsop (c.1618–91) of Alsop-en-le-Dale and Samuel Allsopp (d. 1728/9) of Derby is yet to be proven, a family relation is plausible.

In the last decade of the 19th century, according to directories and gazetteers of the time, Alsop Hall was the residence of John Hall (J.P.) and principal landowners were the Duke of Rutland, Baron Hindlip (who was lord of the manor). and W. Dean.

== Community and leisure ==
Alsop Hall, opposite the church, was built in the late 16th century for the Alsop family.

The village formerly had a station on the railway line connecting Ashbourne and Buxton. Located to the west and above the village, the station is a now a car park and access point for the Tissington Trail, a 13-mile (21 km) bridleway and walk/cycle path that utilises this section of the line. Opened in 1971, it is part of the National Cycle Network.

The village is a convenient starting point for walks into Wolfscote Dale, which lies on the River Dove between Dovedale and Hartington village.

== Religious sites ==
The Church of St. Michael and All Angels is of Norman origin, but was restored in the 19th century. The church serves the hamlets of Alsop Moor, Cold Eaton and Newton Grange.

== See also ==
- Listed buildings in Eaton and Alsop
