= La noche oscura =

Poetry collection by Alejandro Carrión

La noche oscura is a poetry book by Alejandro Carrión first published by the Casa de la Cultura Ecuatoriana at the urging of the poet Jorge Carrera Andrade, then vice-president. This book includes a complete version of the poem Tiniebla first published by the National University of Colombia thanks to the poet and novelist Jaime Ibáñez. Also included is the poem "Jonás" which Luis Cardoza y Aragón claimed to be one of his favorites. "Invitación a la fiesta de la tristeza" was first published in Ecuador 0.0.0, the poetry magazine of Alexander Finisterre. This book deserved an extensive critique by Matilde Elena Lopez.
