= Land of Cockayne =

Land of Cockayne may refer to:

- Cockayne or Cockaigne, a fantastic land of plenty in popular medieval literature
- Land of Cockayne (poem), part of the 14th-century Irish English Kildare poems
- The Land of Cockaigne (Bruegel), a painting by Pieter Bruegel the Elder
- Land of Cockayne (album), an album by Soft Machine
