= Gerardo Vera =

Spanish film director

- Born: Gerardo Vera Perales; 10 March 1947; Miraflores de la Sierra, Madrid, Spain
- Died: 20 September 2020 (aged 73); Miraflores de la Sierra, Madrid, Spain
- Occupations: Set designer; opera director; actor; film director; theatre director

Gerardo Vera Perales (10 March 1947 – 20 September 2020) was a Spanish costume and set designer, opera director, actor, and film and theatre director.

== Life ==
Vera was born in Miraflores de la Sierra on 10 March 1947. He studied English language and literature in the Universidad Complutense de Madrid, and theatre in the University of Exeter. He was the director of the Centro Dramático Nacional (national theatre of Spain) from June 2004 to December 2011.

He directed these films:

- La otra historia de Rosendo Juárez (1990)
- Una mujer bajo la lluvia (1992)
- La Celestina (1994)
- Second Skin (2000)
- Deseo (2003)

His staging of the play Divinas Palabras, by Ramón María del Valle-Inclán, was performed at the Lincoln Center Festival 2007, in New York.

He won a Goya Award for Costume Design in 1986 for the film El amor brujo, by Carlos Saura, and a Goya Award for Best Art Direction for The Girl of Your Dreams, directed by Fernando Trueba. In 1988, he was awarded the Spanish National Theater Prize.

Vera died from COVID-19 on 20 September 2020, at the age of 73 during the COVID-19 pandemic in Spain.
