= Elvaston =

Elvaston may refer to:

- Elvaston, Derbyshire, U.K.
  - Elvaston Castle
- Elvaston Place, London, U.K.
- Elvaston, Illinois, U.S.
