= Newton Grange, Derbyshire =

Coordinates: 53.0792°N 1.7589°W

Newton Grange
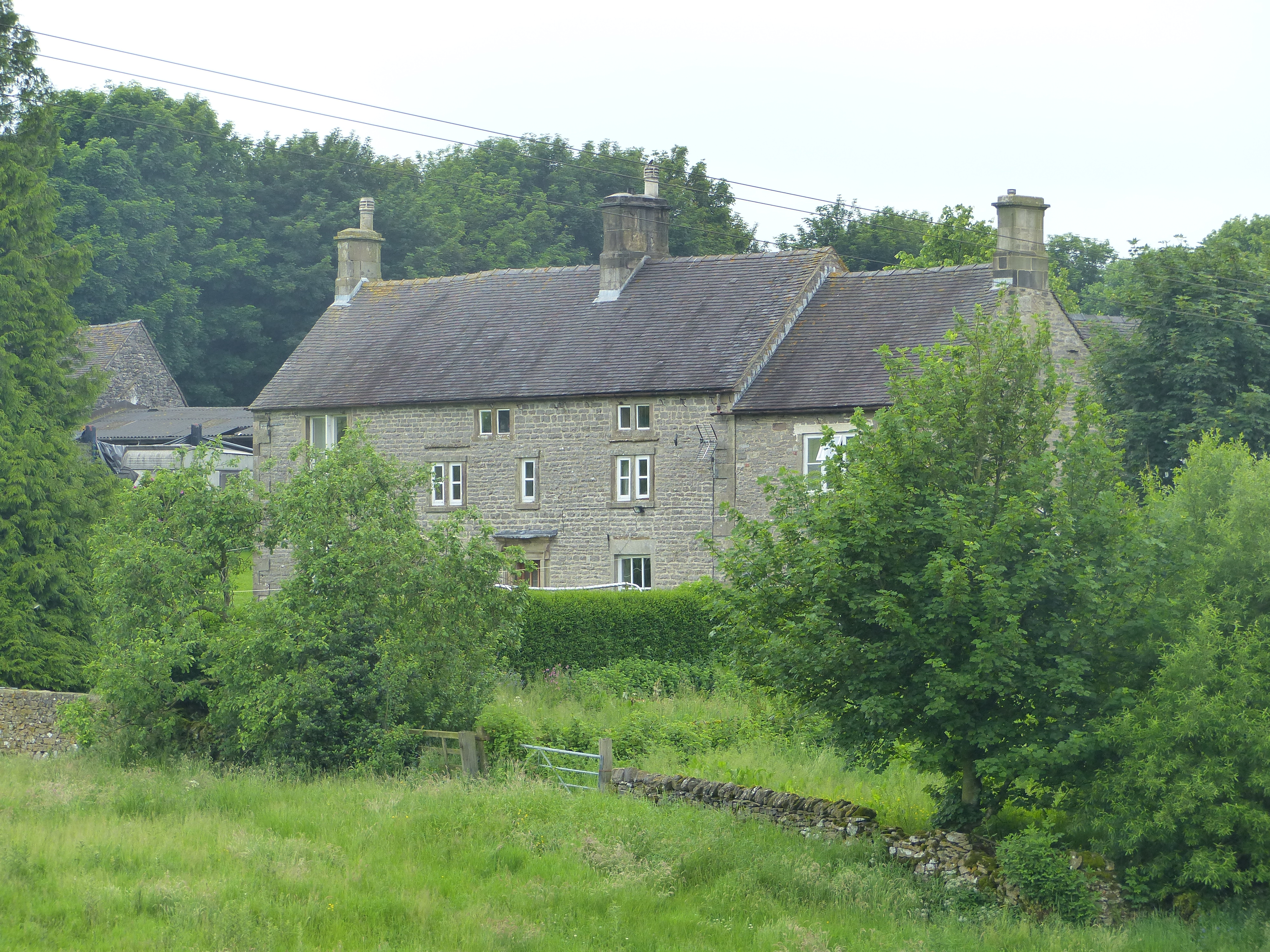
- Newton Grange Farm

- Location within Derbyshire
- OS grid reference: SK1653
- District: Derbyshire Dales
- Shire county: Derbyshire
- Region: East Midlands
- Country: England
- Sovereign state: United Kingdom
- Post town: Bakewell
- Postcode district: DE6
- Police: Derbyshire
- Fire: Derbyshire
- Ambulance: East Midlands
- UK Parliament: Derbyshire Dales

Newton Grange is a civil parish in the Derbyshire Dales district of central Derbyshire. For administrative purposes it shares a parish council with the neighbouring parish of Eaton and Alsop. When the parish council was instituted in its present form in 1974, the parish contained eight farms (one of which gives the parish its name) and four dwellings. The western boundary of the parish is the River Dove, including the eastern side of part of Dovedale.

The A515 road between Buxton and Ashbourne, and the Tissington Trail, a cycleway and footpath following a former railway between the same two towns, run north–south through the parish. The tree-covered bowl barrow of Moat Low, a scheduled monument, is a prominent hilltop landmark to the west of the main road.

== See also ==
- Listed buildings in Newton Grange, Derbyshire
