= Eaton and Alsop =

Civil parish in Derbyshire, England

Coordinates: 53.101°N 1.769°W

- Civil parish
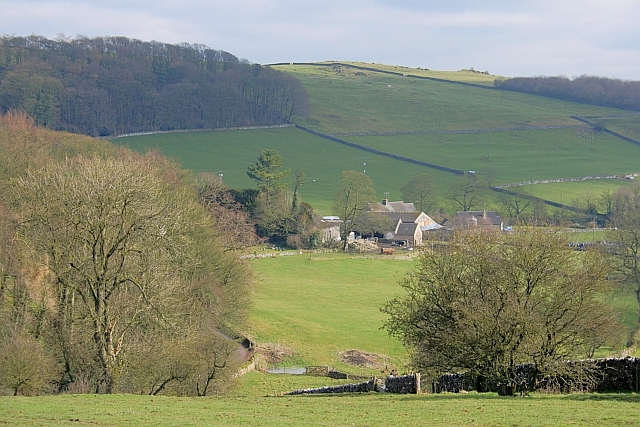
- Alsop en le Dale

- Location within Derbyshire
- Interactive map of Eaton and Alsop
- Area: 4.6 sq mi (12 km^{2})
- Population: 80 (2021)
  - Density: 17/sq mi (6.6/km^{2})
- OS grid reference: SK 157564
  - London: 130 mi (210 km) SE
- District: Derbyshire Dales
- Shire county: Derbyshire
- Region: East Midlands
- Country: England
- Sovereign state: United Kingdom
- Settlements: Alsop en le Dale; Eaton
- Post town: ASHBOURNE
- Postcode district: DE6
- Dialling code: 01335
- Police: Derbyshire
- Fire: Derbyshire
- Ambulance: East Midlands
- UK Parliament: Derbyshire Dales

Eaton and Alsop Civil Parish

Eaton and Alsop is a civil parish within the Derbyshire Dales district, in the county of Derbyshire, England. Largely rural, in 2021 Eaton and Alsop had a population of only 80 residents. It is 130 miles (210 km) north west of London, 17 miles (27 km) north west of the county city of Derby, and 6 miles (9.7 km) north of the market town of Ashbourne. Eaton and Alsop is wholly within the Peak District national park, and touches the parishes of Alstonefield, Hartington Nether Quarter, Newton Grange and Parwich. There are five listed buildings in Eaton and Alsop.

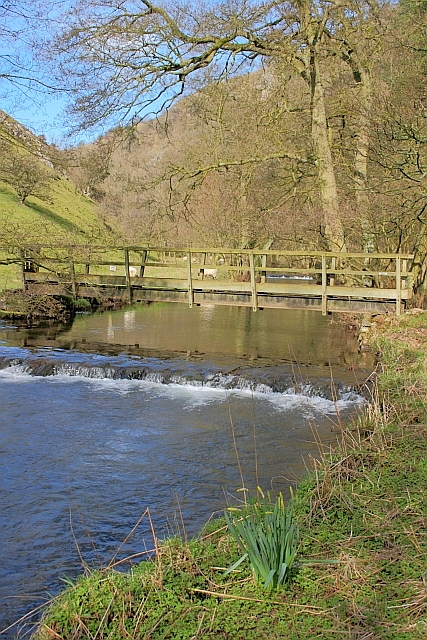
Coldeaton bridge - one of several foot crossings over the River Dove

== Geography ==
=== Location ===
Eaton and Alsop is surrounded by the following local areas:

- Biggin to the north
- Newton Grange to the south
- Parwich to the east
- Alstonefield to the west.

The parish is roughly bounded by the River Dove to the west. The Liffs round barrow feature is to the north, Alsop Moor and Cross Low tumulus in the east, with Alsop village and The Pinch lane to the south.

Eaton and Alsop is completely within the Peak District National Park.

=== Settlements ===
There are only two places within the parish:

- Alsop en le Dale, close to the south east boundary
- Eaton, this is 1 mile (1.6 km) north west.

These are on opposing sides of the A515 Ashbourne to Buxton road. The only village of size is Alsop en le Dale, which is wholly situated along Dam Lane. Eaton is accessed via a single track road off Liffs Road. Despite being part of the parish name, Eaton is a hamlet considered to be a deserted medieval village, with only two farms in the locality.

=== Environment ===
==== Landscape and geology ====
Primarily farm and pasture land throughout the parish outside the populated areas, there are some small forestry plots throughout, with a stretch alongside the Dove Valley called Fishpond Bank and further north, Iron Tors and Biggin Dale. The soil is light, while the subsoil is mainly limestone.

==== Watercourse ====
The River Dove forms the boundary to the west, with features including weirs, footbridges and stepping stones.

==== Land elevation ====
The parish can be hilly and undulating in places. The lowest point is in the south west boundary along the River Dove at ~180 metres (590 ft), Alsop village is 220–230 metres (720–750 ft), Eaton is higher at 300–310 metres (980–1,020 ft), while the parish peak is along the north east boundary near Hawks Low round barrow at 382 metres (1,253 ft).

== History ==
=== Toponymy ===
Alsop: It was reported in Domesday as Elleshope. The full modern name of this place is Alsop en le Dale, meaning 'Ælli's/Ella's valley', the 'en la Dale' suffix being a later addition. The initial element is from the name of the Anglo Saxon King Ella, and the later syllable is from the Celtic 'hwpp' meaning 'a sloping place between hills' - the sloping place of Ella between the hills.

Eaton: Short for Coldeaton or Cold Eaton, it was known as Eitune as reported in Domesday in 1086 which means 'island farm'. It is above the steeply-rising bank of the River Dove, situated on a spur and overlooking a small island in the river. It is prefixed 'Cold' due to its exposed location.

Eaton and Alsop, as an ecclesiastical and subsequent political entity, were together first constituted as a township and chapelry within the parish of Ashbourne, and subsequently separated out as an independent civil parish, before 1883.

=== Eaton ===
Eaton and Alsop was originally separate townships and manors in times past, with the first ever Derbyshire map by Christopher Saxton in 1579 indicating both as discrete settlements, but these were later merged as a township within the ancient parish of Ashbourne, latterly becoming a standalone parish before 1883, with many others being created in 1866 and councils being formed in 1894.

It is thought the field between the only remaining two farms at Eaton may have been occupied in medieval times, with more recent aerial photography lending weight to this with evidence of possible crofts. Eaton was regularly appearing in the records known as King's Remembrancer, which was an account and other records relating to lay and clerical taxation in England and Wales, until the 17th century.

=== Railway and station ===
The Ashbourne line formerly ran through the parish from Ashbourne to Buxton. It was built in 1899 and after network cuts, closed in 1963/4. There was a railway station by the A515 and Oxclose Lane road junction, it is now a car park for the Tissington Trail, which reuses the trackbed.

== Industry ==
As well as the regularised agricultural roles because of its rural location, primarily for pasture farming, the area has also supported limestone mining and lime burning for many centuries which have provided stone for building and road making, with several pits and kilns previously recorded in the vicinity.

== Governance and demography ==
=== Population ===
There are 80 residents recorded within Eaton and Alsop for the 2021 census. Previously, there were 155 residents recorded within Eaton and Alsop (with Newton Grange) for the 2011 census, increasing from 145 in 2001.

=== Council administration ===
The two settlements Eaton and Alsop and surrounding rural areas form a parish.

However, a parish council is formed with neighbouring Newton Grange parish, and is managed at the first level of public administration by Eaton and Alsop and Newton Grange Parish Council.

At district level, the wider area is overseen by Derbyshire Dales district council. Derbyshire County Council provides the highest level strategic services locally.

== Community and leisure ==
=== Tourism ===
There are a number of holiday lodges and campsites throughout catering particularly to Peak District visitors. The medium distance Peak District walking route Tissington Trail and route 68 of the National Cycle Network follows the now unused Ashbourne railway line, which routes from north to south within the parish. There is a car park for trail users at the former train station. There is another trail alongside the River Dove within the parish that is partway between the scenic areas of Dovedale and Wolfscote Dale via Fishpond Bank, Iron Tors and Biggin Dale.

== Landmarks ==
=== Listed buildings ===
There are five listed structures within the parish, all at Grade II designation. These are:

- Church of St Michael
- Alsop Hall
- Two farmhouses
- A milepost along the A515 road

All except the milepost are in Alsop village. There are presently no listed features at Eaton.

=== Local monuments ===
A number of tumulus is spread across the wider region. Eaton and Alsop parish has several of some note:

- Nettly Knowe, in the middle of the parish
- Lifts Low straddles the northern boundary
- Hawks Low is primarily in the adjacent Parwich parish, but the highest point of the hill is in Eaton and Alsop
- Cross Low, to the south east
- Stoney Lew, by Eaton.

== Religious sites ==
=== Church of St Michael and All Angels ===
A standout feature of Alsop village, the church of St Michaels and All Angels dates to the 12th century but was largely rebuilt in the 19th century.

== Notable people ==
- Anthony Alsop (c.1618-1691), Lord of the manor of Alsop-en-le-Dale
- Henry Allsopp, 1st Baron Hindlip (1811–1887), later Lord of the manor and industrialist
