= Cockayne baronets =

Extinct baronetcy in the Baronetage of England

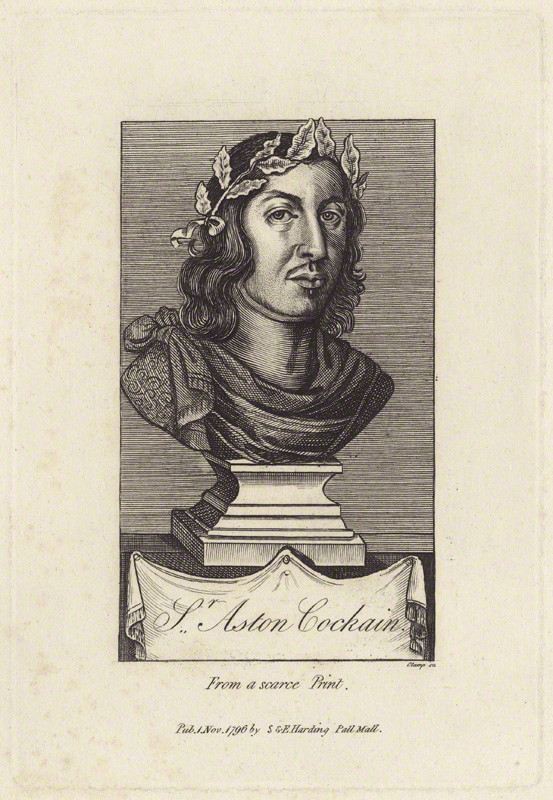
Engraving of Sir Aston Cockayne, 1st Baronet (1608–1684)

The baronetcy of Cockayne of Ashbourne was created in the Baronetage of England on 10 January 1642 for Aston Cockayne, Lord of Ashbourne Hall, Derbyshire and Pooley Hall, Polesworth, Warwickshire.

Sir Aston Cockayne was a cavalier and author. He was a friend of King Charles I and received the title Baronet Cockayne of Ashbourne in return for his support during the English Civil War.

== Cockayne family ==
Cockayne coat of arms

The Cockayne (or Cokayne) family settled at Ashbourne in the twelfth century. Ancestors of the baronet included Sir John Cockayne, steward to John of Gaunt, Sir Edmund Cockayne, slain at the Battle of Shrewsbury in 1403, and Sir John Cokayne, a turbulent Lancastrian knight who represented Derbyshire nine times in Parliament.

The Cockayne family owned the manors of Ashbourne Hall and Pooley Hall.

Sir Aston Cockayne was the first and last baronet.

== Cockayne of Ashbourne (1642) ==
- Sir Aston Cockayne, 1st Baronet

== Homes ==
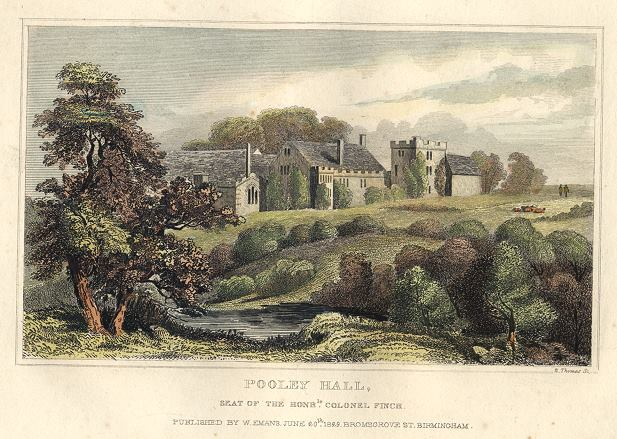
Copper plate engraving of Pooley Hall dated 1829

- Ashbourne Hall in Derbyshire served as the Cockayne family seat until its sale in 1671.
- Pooley Hall, near Polesworth, Warwickshire was the family's country retreat until its sale at the end of the 17th century.
- The Cockayne family bought the lease of Sturston Hall, near Ashbourne, Derbyshire from their relations, the Kniveton family, in 1650. It was sold to Francis Meynell.

== See also ==
- For the Rushton, Northamptonshire branch of the Cockayne Family, see Viscount Cullen and Baron Cullen of Ashbourne.
