= Bradbourne Hall =

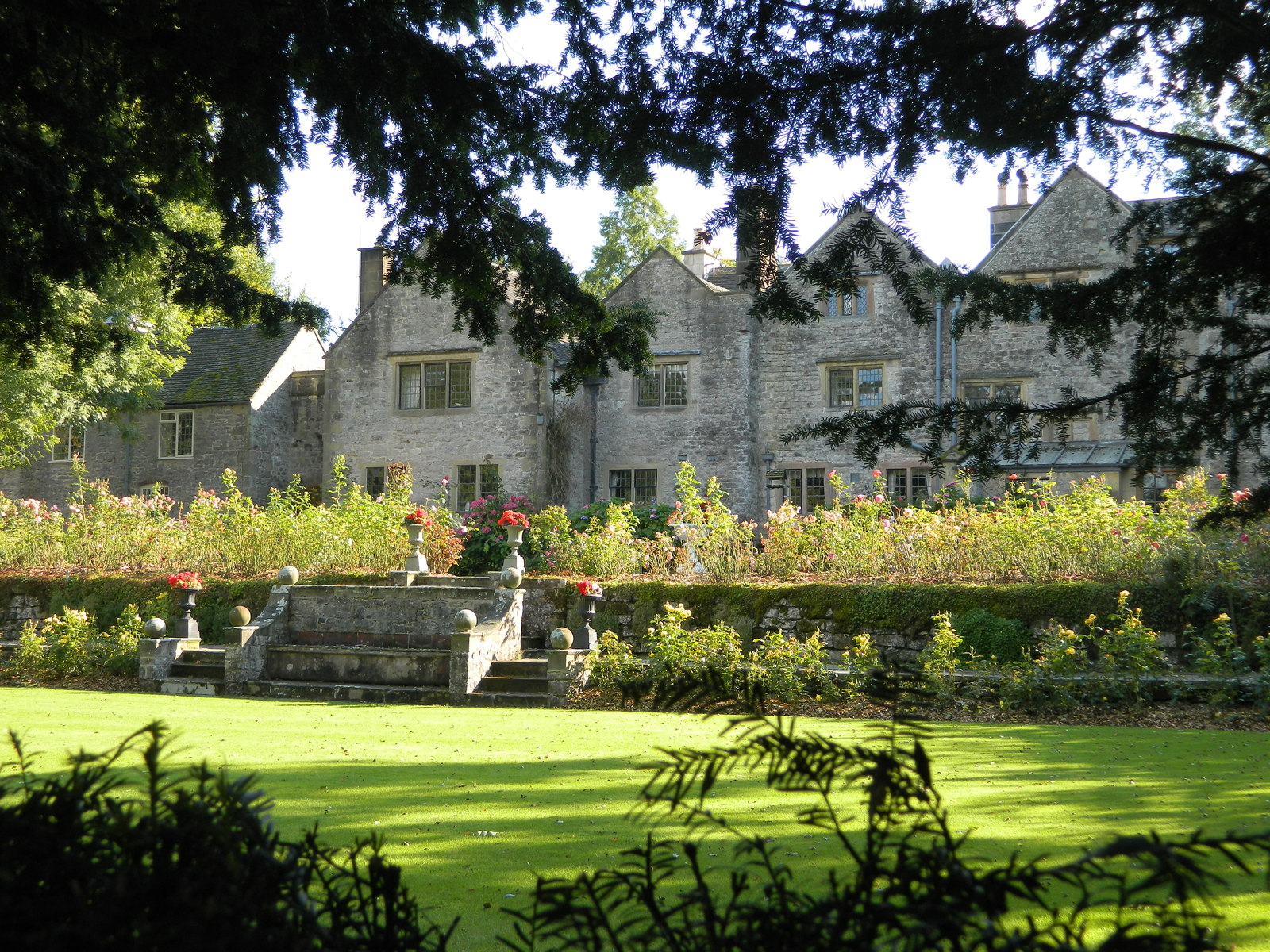
- Bradbourne Hall, as seen from the garden in 2012

- Location within Derbyshire
- 53°04′17.8″N 1°41′25.1″W
- OS grid reference: SK 20848 52752

History
- Built: c.1610
- Built for: George Buxton

Listed Building – Grade II*
- Official name: Bradbourne Hall
- Designated: 11 October 1983
- Reference no.: 1109477

Bradbourne Hall is a country house near All Saint's Church, within the civil parish of Bradbourne, near Ashbourne, Derbyshire. It is a privately owned Grade II* listed building, and is not open to the public.

Bradbourne Hall was built by the Buxtons/Buckstons on the site of an earlier rectory for All Saint's Church. It was tenanted to Colonel David Wilkie, and the archaeologist, author and essayist Albert Hartshorne.

== History ==
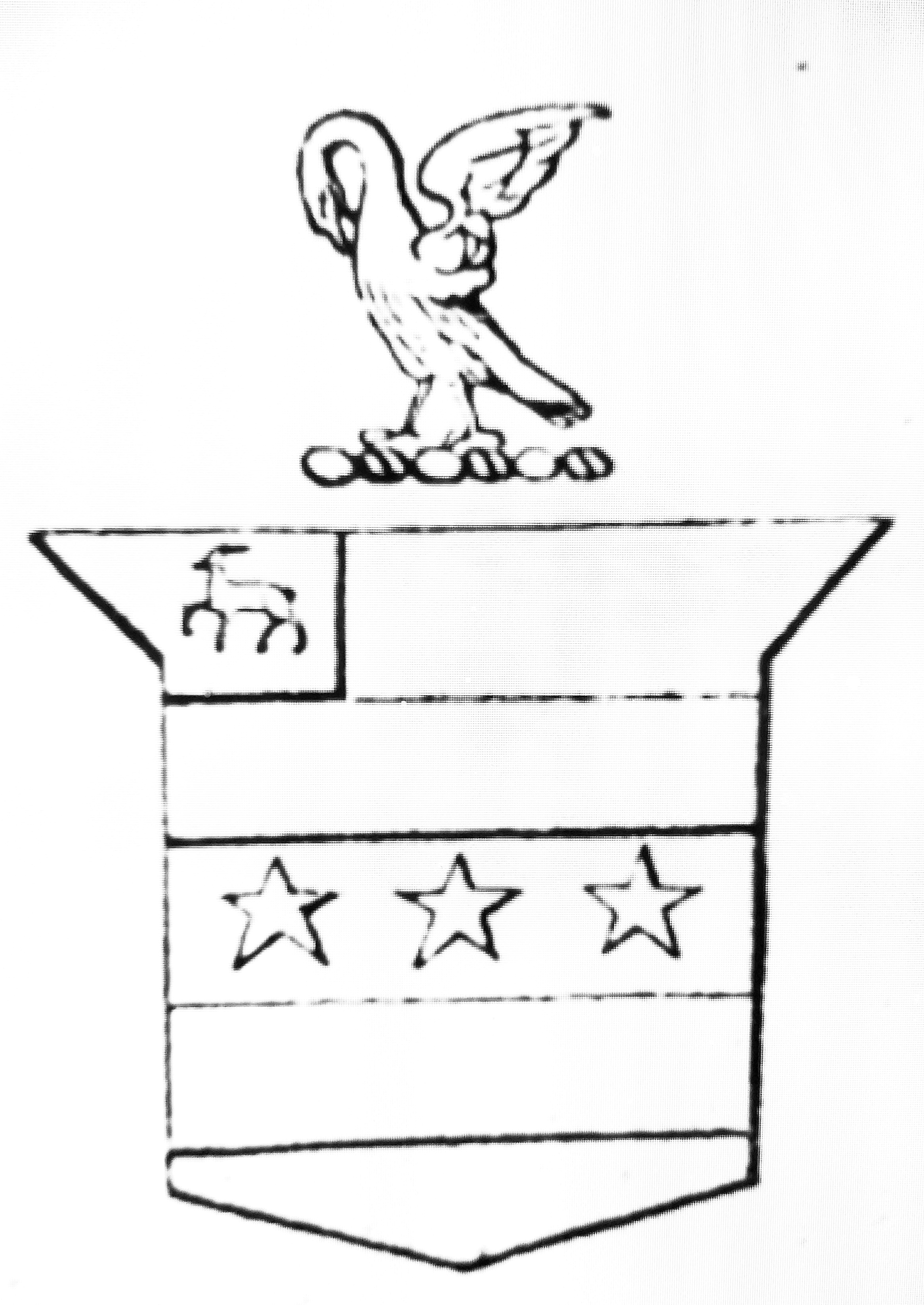
The escutcheon of the Buxton family.

=== 1086–1609 ===
The estate that surrounds Bradbourne Hall has always been attached to the nearby Bradbourne Priory (the remaining building of which is now All Saint's Church). The church itself was recorded in the Domesday Book of 1086, though it and its surrounding buildings were rebuilt and extended throughout the 12th century, with a large-scale reconstruction work taking place at the beginning of the 13th century.

Bradbourne Hall stands upon the site of the rectory for the church. Although the year in which the rectory was built was unknown, it is known to have existed by 1278. It is also possible that it either replaced or incorporated earlier priory buildings. It is known that at one point, three canons from Dunstable Priory resided at this rectory, and served the parishes of Bradbourne, Brassington, Tissington, Ballidon and Atlow.

Geffrey de Cauceis, who held the land, gave it to the Dunstable Priory in 1205. However, during the dissolution of the monasteries (1536–1541), it was forfeited to the estate of Crown.

=== 1609–1834 ===
Following the dissolution of the monasteries, George Buxton purchased the former glebe lands of All Saint's Church, which consisted of some 260 acres in 1609. Within the glebe was the old rectory, which he demolished. Buxton then constructed Bradbourne Hall in c.1610, for his own occupation. With the purchase came the advowson, which as a consequence meant that the family held cleric positions within the parish for the following centuries.

A later relative of the Buxton that built the house – George Buckston (died 1810) – changed the spelling of the family surname. His son Rev. George Buckston was vicar of Bradbourne 1803–1826, and his grandson Rev. German Buckston succeeded to the position and held it until 1861. Rev. German Buxton married Ellen Ward, who was the daughter of the vicar of Sutton on the Hill.

The Buxtons left Bradbourne when Ellen Buxton's father died in 1834, and so Rev. German Buxton moved to Sutton on the Hill to take his position. Bradbourne Hall was then let out to a series of tenants.

=== 1834–1910 ===
The dates and details of all the tenants that lived at Bradbourne throughout the mid- to late 19th century are not recorded in detail. At one point during the mid-19th century, Colonel David Wilkie – who was involved in the 1859 Indian Mutiny (4th Bengal Native Infantry) – was a resident at Bradbourne Hall.

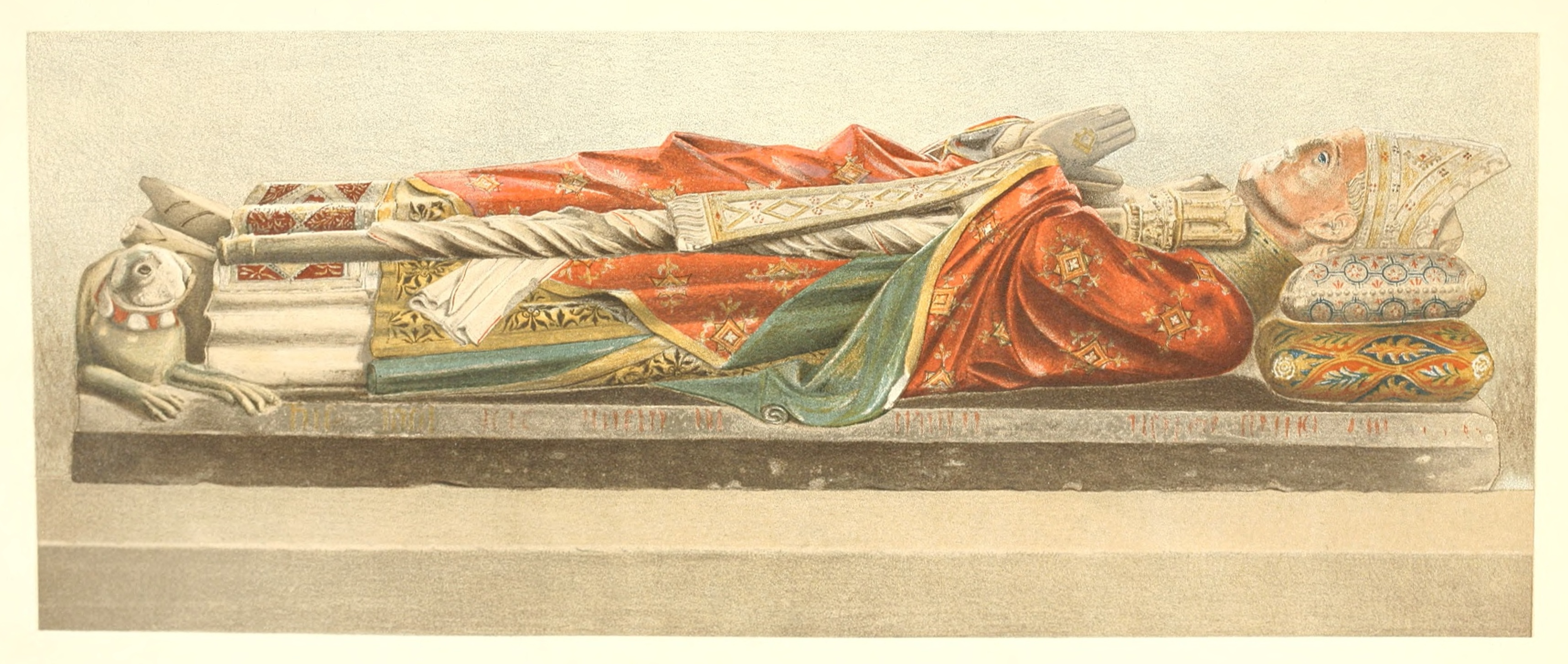
An archaeological illustration by Hartshorne of John de Sheppey's effigy, drawn by him whilst he was living at Bradbourne Hall in 1893.

The archaeologist, author and essayist Albert Hartshorne and his wife Constance Hartshorne were residents at Bradbourne Hall during the late 19th and early 20th century. Though the year in which they moved in remains unknown, Kelly's Directory (which recorded a history of the house) notes Hartshorne as the resident of Bradbourne Hall in 1891. Constance died there in 1901, and Albert would live at Bradbourne Hall until his death in 1910.

=== 1910– ===
The house was sold L. W. Hodson in the 1920s, and altered and extended in 1929. It remains as a private house, and is not open to the public.

== Architecture ==
The entry for the Grade II* listing from Historic England reads:

House. Late C16/early C17, with later alterations. Coursed squared limestone with gritstone dressings and quoins. Slate roof with stone ridge. Various stone stacks. Three gabled front with stone copings. Three storeys, four bays, one to east recessed. Original two bays with central chamfered doorcase with hoodmould...interior much altered but has C17 turned baluster stairs with rounded finials and moulded handrail. Attached garden wall with large stone piers surmounted by banded ball finials.

== See also ==
- Grade II* listed buildings in Derbyshire Dales
- Listed buildings in Bradbourne
- Bradbourne Priory
- Albert Hartshorne
