= Listed buildings in Ballidon =

Ballidon is a civil parish in the Derbyshire Dales district of Derbyshire, England. The parish contains 15 listed buildings that are recorded in the National Heritage List for England. All the listed buildings are designated at Grade II, the lowest of the three grades, which is applied to "buildings of national importance and special interest". The parish contains the villages of Ballidon and Pikehall, and Ballidon Quarry, and is otherwise entirely rural. Most of the listed buildings are farmhouses and farm buildings, two of which has been converted for other uses by the quarry. The other listed buildings are a church, a milestone, a lime kiln, and an embankment and bridge, originally carrying a railway, and later part of the High Peak Trail.

== Buildings ==
Name and location	Photograph	Date	Notes
All Saints' Church; 53.08676°N 1.69703°W		12th century	The church, which was almost completely rebuilt in 1882, is in limestone with gritstone dressings, and stone slate roofs with a coped west gable. It consists of a nave, a south porch, a chancel and a north vestry, with a bellcote on the west gable. The church has retained some Norman features.
Ballidonhall Farmhouse; 53.08939°N 1.69863°W		17th century	The farmhouse is in limestone with gritstone dressings, quoins, and tile roofs with coped gables. It is in two and three storeys, and has a T-shaped plan, with a three-bay main range and a lower rear wing. In the centre is a round-arched doorway with a fanlight, projecting imposts, and a keystone. Some of the windows are sashes, and others are mullioned.
Cowclose Farmhouse; 53.08847°N 1.69695°W		Late 17th century	The farmhouse, which was extended in the early 19th century, is in limestone with gritstone dressings, tile roofs with coped gables and kneelers, and two storeys. The earlier north wing is rendered on three sides, and contains mullioned or single-light windows. The south wing has a front with three gables, a central doorway with a pediment, and sash windows.
Holly Bush Farmhouse; 53.12866°N 1.71297°W	—	18th century	The farmhouse is in rendered limestone with gritstone dressings, quoins, a coved eaves band, and a slate roof with coped gables and moulded kneelers. There are three storeys and three bays. The doorway has a quoined surround and a lintel, and the windows are mullioned with two lights.
The Cottage; 53.09046°N 1.69920°W		18th century	A pair of cottages combined into a house, in limestone with sandstone dressings, a tile roof, and two storeys. There are two doorways with lintels, one blocked, and a later inserted doorway. Some windows are mullioned with casements, and others have horizontally-sliding sashes.
Tilcon Laboratory and outbuilding 53.09172°N 1.69960°W		18th century	A farmhouse and outbuildings converted for other uses, the building is in limestone with gritstone dressings and a tile roof. There are two storeys, and the former farmhouse has three bays. The doorway has a lintel, one window has a single lights, and the others are mullioned. The lower outbuildings on the right contain three round-arched doorways and three windows.
Tilcon Offices, Ballidon Quarry; 53.09299°N 1.70155°W		Mid-18th century	A farmhouse, later used as offices, it is in limestone with gritstone dressings, quoins, and a tile roof with coped gables and kneelers. There are three storeys and three bays, and later two-storey extensions on the left. The central doorway has a quoined surround and a lintel, and the windows are mullioned with two lights. At the rear is a five-tier stair window.
Ballidonmoor Farmhouse and outbuildings 53.09761°N 1.68392°W	—	Late 18th century	The farmhouse is in limestone with sandstone dressings and a tile roof. There are three storeys and four bays, the left bay gabled. The two doorways have quoined surrounds and lintels, and the windows are mullioned The outbuildings project at the south.
Milestone; 53.08207°N 1.69230°W		Late 18th century	The milestone on the northwest side of the B5056 road is in gritstone, and has a semicircular top. It is inscribed with the distances to Ashbourne and Bakewell.
Oldfields Farmhouse; 53.08890°N 1.69612°W		Late 18th century	The farmhouse is in limestone with gritstone dressings, quoins, and a tile roof with coped gables and kneelers. There are two storeys, and an L-shaped plan, with a front of three bays. The central doorway has a quoined surround and a lintel, to its right is a bow window, and the other windows are mullioned.
Roystone Grange Farmhouse and barn 53.10782°N 1.70214°W		Late 18th century	The farmhouse and barn are in limestone, partly pebbledashed, with gritstone dressings and tile roofs. The house has three storeys and three bays. In the centre is a doorway, above is a single-light window, and the other windows are mullioned with two lights. The barn, attached on the right, is lower and has two storeys. It contains three doorways with chamfered quoined surrounds, and an opening in the upper floor with a chamfered surround.
Minninglow embankment and bridge 53.12096°N 1.70682°W		c. 1825	The embankment and bridge were built by the Cromford and High Peak Railway, and it is now part of the High Peak Trail. It is in limestone, about one-sixth of a mile long, and between 40 feet (12 m) and 50 feet (15 m) high. The embankment has dry stone retaining walls rising to form parapets, and it contains a round-arched bridge.
Barns southwest of Ballidonmoor Farmhouse; 53.09750°N 1.68437°W	—	Early 19th century	The barns are in limestone with sandstone dressings, quoins, and corrugated asbestos roofs with gables, some coped with kneelers. There are two storeys, and in the south range are a segmental-arched opening and two circular openings above. The north range contains a large semicircular opening.
Lime kiln 53.11316°N 1.69418°W		Early 19th century	The lime kiln by the High Peak Trail is in limestone, and set into a hillside. It is about 15 feet (4.6 m) high, with a U-shaped plan, and it has a semicircular opening.
Barn southeast of Oldfields Farmhouse; 53.08876°N 1.69564°W		Mid-19th century	The barn is in limestone, with dressings in gritstone and brick, and tile roofs. There are two storeys and an L-shaped plan. In the centre of the west front is a circular window with blue brick surround, and a gabled dormer above.
