= Bradbourne Priory =

Priory in Derbyshire, England

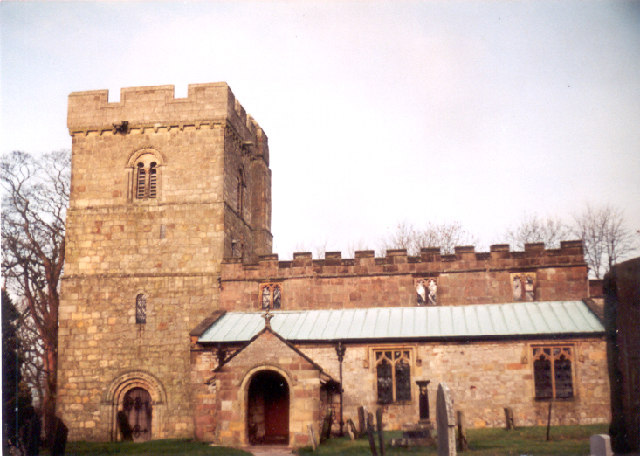
- All Saints Parish Church, Bradbourne

- Location within Derbyshire

Monastery information
- Other names: Later, All Saints Parish Church
- Order: Presumed Augustinian
- Mother house: Dunstable Priory
- Diocese: Diocese of Lichfield
- Controlled churches: Tissington, Brassington and Ballidon

People
- Founder: Unknown

Site
- Location: Bradbourne, Derbyshire, England, United Kingdom.
- Coordinates: 53°4′17″N 1°41′27″W
- Visible remains: Part of present Parish Church

Bradbourne Priory was a priory in Bradbourne, Derbyshire, England.

The Priory at Bradbourne consisted of the main priory church and community at Bradbourne, and three chapelries at Tissington, Brassington and Ballidon.

The priory church at Bradbourne exists today as All Saints Parish Church, which is currently Grade I Listed.

== Architectural history ==
There has been a church on the site since Saxon times; The present churchyard is home to the Bradbourne Cross, an 8th-century depiction of the crucifixion, which was at some-point smashed but has now been partially reconstructed.

A church is listed as being on the site in the Domesday Book of 1086, but a new church appears to have been constructed at the beginning of the 12th century. This Norman church is deemed to have been of "considerable size" as the tower was larger and taller than those normally expected at the time. No part of the church listed in the Domesday Book is thought to still exist; however, of the Norman church, both the tower and the south porch remain mostly unaltered. Architectural remains suggest the church would have been partially rebuilt or altered at the beginning of the 13th century. The chancel is thought to be slight later; the design of the east window suggesting it was constructed circa 1320. The church, which is dedicated to All Saints, consists of nave, with south aisle and porch, chancel and tower at the west end.

Adjacent to the church sits Bradbourne Hall, which is believed to be built upon the foundations of the previous priory buildings or rectory.

== History ==
=== Early history ===
The site has been of religious significance since at least Saxon times. New churches are known to have been built before the Domesday Book of 1086, again at the beginning of the 12th century, and then large-scale reconstruction work at the beginning of the 13th century. The status of these early churches—whether they served as priories or as parish churches—is not known.

=== 13th century ===
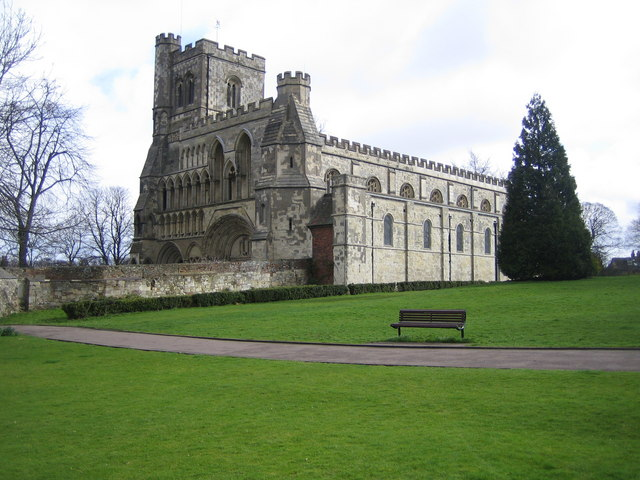
Dunstable Priory

In 1205, Sir Geoffrey de Cauceis sold the Manor of Bradbourne to Godard de Bradbourn; he, however, did not allow the church to go with the manor house, gifting the advowson of Bradbourne Priory (along with all of its lands and chapels) to Dunstable Priory in Bedfordshire; Bradbourne would then act as a "cell" to Dunstable. The priory's income provided finance for three canons.

In 1214, the prior had a suit in court at the Vatican, in Rome: his suit was against the priory's vicars and rector, with the aim of removing them. The prior alleged that the rector, Robert, was the son of the former rector, Godfrey; and that one of the vicars, Henry, was the son of his predecessor, John. Allegations were also made against the other vicar, William, accusing him of keeping "a concubine publicly, and went a hunting, forsaking his tonsure and clerical duties".

In 1243 over 800 sheep belonging to the priory died; however, in 1284 the priory is recorded as owning 1,200 cattle and sheep.

In 1278, in return for a fee of two hundred marks (which was raised from the chapelries of Atlow and Brassington), Roger de Meyland, Bishop of Coventry and Lichfield confirmed and recognised Bradbourne Priory and its chapelries.

In 1291 the priory was valued as worth 60 marks; however, by 1295 Bradbourne Priory had fallen into poverty. To help alleviate this, all the wool produced at the priory was granted to the support of the three brethren who served the church and chapels.

=== 14th century ===
In 1305 the prior took Roger Bradbourn, lord of the manor of Bradbourne, to court, accusing him (and five others) of mining lead ore worth 100 shillings from the priory's lands. Roger's defence that this was of "the invariable custom of the Peak". The prior's argument was that Sir Geoffrey de Cauceis had not only given the Bradbourne church, but also all the village's lands. The court decided in favour of the prior; Roger de Bradbourn and his heirs were thereby banned from ever disturbing the soil on the church's lands.

Around 1330, Dunstable Priory wrote to Roger Northburgh, Bishop of Coventry and Lichfield, asking for him to provide a secular vicar to serve at the church of Bradbourne (instead of them keeping two of their monks or canons there). The bishop agreed and so the Priory gave two "bovates" of land, tithe free, to for the new vicar, at Tissington; they then constructed a new hall for the vicar to live in. The vicar was endowed with the tithes of corn, hay, and lambs from Tissington, and with the mills throughout the parish; he was also granted the tithes, mortuaries and altar dues from the parish and chapelries in return for conducting the services, at his own expense, in the Priory and all of its chapels. This arrangement effectively ended Bradbourne's time as a traditional priory, and established it as a parish church. It remained under the control of Dunstable Priory, however, who would often provide one of their own to be vicar.

=== 16th century ===
The Valor Ecclesiasticus in 1535 estimated the annual value of the vicarage at £8 3s 4d.; this sum included a pension from the Abbot of Dale of 6s. 8d., and an annual payment of £4 from the Prior of Dunstable. At the time "Dns Johes Barret" held the vicarage. The annual value of the rectorial manor held by the priory was estimated at £24 10s. 0d.

On 30 September 1554, Bradbourne was visited by the Commissioners of King Edward VI who performed an inventory of church goods with a view of selling those with superstitious uses. The following things were appropriated:

"Vestments with all things, aulter clothes, towels, coope, surpleses, cruets pewter, senser off bras, crosse off wodd, bucket of bras, caudelstyke off iron, pyxe of bras, cannabe (canopy) covering, corperas case, bells, sanctus bell, hand bells, sakeryng bells, chalice with a paten parcel gilte."

The curate at the time was listed as "Thos Swetnam". Following the Dissolution of the Monasteries, the vicarage passed to the Cavendish family, later Dukes of Devonshire.

=== 17th century ===
In 1609, the former glebe lands, of some 260 acres (1.1 km^{2}), and the advowson of All Saints were purchased by George Buxton; He replaced the old vicarage with the present Bradbourne Hall, which was for his own occupation.

By 1627 the church at Bradbourne was in need of serious repairs, with a greatly decayed roof and decaying timbers, lead, windows and bells, all estimated as costing around £46 to repair or replace (almost 3 years' average craftsman's wages). On 10 February 1629, Thomas Buxton and Vincent Sexton, churchwardens of Bradbourne, took a suit to the Chancery against William Cokayne, Valentine Jackson and four others living at the nearby village of Atlow, declaring it an ancient custom for all the parishioners of Atlow to pay for the repair of the parish church at Bradbourne, but that they had not been paying it. The following year the court decided that the inhabitants of Atlow were to pay annually 5s. 6d. per oxgang (15 acres) to Bradbourne for repairs; but they were not to be charged for any previous arrears.
