= Listed buildings in Bradbourne =

Bradbourne is a civil parish in the Derbyshire Dales district of Derbyshire, England. The parish contains 16 listed buildings that are recorded in the National Heritage List for England. Of these, one is listed at Grade I, the highest of the three grades, one is at Grade II*, the middle grade, and the others are at Grade II, the lowest grade. The parish contains the village of Bradbourne and the surrounding countryside. The listed buildings consist of houses, cottages and associated structures, farmhouses and farm buildings, a church and items in the churchyard, and a former watermill and associated buildings.

== Key ==
Grade	Criteria
I	Buildings of exceptional interest, sometimes considered to be internationally important
II*	Particularly important buildings of more than special interest
II	Buildings of national importance and special interest

== Buildings ==
Name and location	Photograph	Date	Notes	Grade
Cross, All Saints' Church; 53.07140°N 1.69088°W		Late 8th or early 9th century	The cross shaft in the churchyard has been reconstructed from fragments, and has elaborate carved decoration. On the west and east sides are scrolls and intertwined beasts, on the north face are figures, and on the south side is a depiction of the Crucifixion.	II
All Saints' Church; 53.07169°N 1.69091°W		12th century	The church has been altered and extended through the centuries, and was restored in 1846. It is built in gritstone and has a copper roof on the south aisle, and a stone slate roof on the south porch. The church consists of a nave with a clerestory, a south aisle, a south porch, a chancel with a north vestry, and a west tower. The tower has three stages, a west doorway with a round head and a keystone, and in the south wall is an elaborate 12th-century doorcase with two bands of voussoirs carved with beasts, and an outer band with beakhead motifs. There is a projecting staircase to the northeast, a string course on carved heads, twin bell openings with zigzag arches, and an embattled parapet. There is also an embattled parapet on the nave.	I
Bradbourne Hall; 53.07161°N 1.69022°W		Late 15th or early 16th century	A further gabled bay was added to the house in 1929. The house is in limestone with gritstone dressings, quoins, and a slate roof with a stone ridge and coped gables. There are three storeys, three gabled bays, the left bay later, and a recessed right bay. The doorway has a chamfered surround and a hood mould, and on the left bay is a two-storey canted bay window. Most of the other windows are mullioned with hood moulds, and the attached garden wall contains stone piers with banded ball finials.	II*
Netherton Hall; 53.06787°N 1.67182°W		1684	A farmhouse in limestone with gritstone dressings, quoins, a tile roof, and bargeboards to the end gables. There are three storeys, a front of three bays, and a rear wing. On the front, the original doorway has a dated lintel, and has been infilled with a window, and to its left is a later doorway. The windows are mullioned, and there is a continuous hood mould over the openings in the lower two floors, stepped over the dated lintel. Above the original doorway is a sundial with a blocked stair window above.	II
The Bank; 53.06859°N 1.67540°W	—	1703	A pair of cottages in limestone with gritstone dressings, quoins, a projecting eaves band, and a tile roof with coped gables and moulded kneelers. There are two storeys and three bays, and a single-storey outshut to the south. On the front is a doorway with a moulded surround and a segmental hood, and a later inserted doorway. The windows are mullioned with small-pane casements, and above the ground floor openings is a moulded string course.	II
Bradbourne Mill; 53.06637°N 1.70126°W		1726	The watermill, later used for other purposes, is in limestone with a tile roof. There is a T-shaped plan, with a three-bay main range, and a two-storey range to the south. Much of the machinery remains, including two backshot waterwheels.	II
Sundial, All Saints' Church; 53.07154°N 1.69090°W		18th century	The sundial in the churchyard is in gritstone. It has a two-step circular base, a tapering column on a moulded base, with shell decoration and a moulded capital. On the top is an octagonal copper dial with a decorative triangular gnomon.	II
Sundial, Bradbourne Hall; 53.07148°N 1.69025°W	—	18th century	The sundial in the lawn at the front of the house is in gritstone. It has a two-step circular base, a tapering column on a moulded base, with shell decoration and a moulded capital. On the top is an octagonal copper dial with a decorative triangular gnomon.	II
Bradbourne Mill House; 53.06647°N 1.70090°W		18th century	The house is in limestone, and has a tile roof with coped gables and moulded kneelers. There are two storeys and two bays, and the windows are mullioned with small-pane casements. To the west is a single-storey outshut that has a stone slate roof with moulded gable copings and kneelers.	II
Crowtrees Farmhouse and outbuildings 53.06971°N 1.67508°W		18th century	The farmhouse, which has an earlier core, and the outbuildings are in limestone with a tile roof. The farmhouse has two storeys and three bays, and to the left is a single-storey outshut. On the front is a doorway with a plain lintel, and the windows are mullioned. To the right are stepped outbuildings, consisting of a two-storey building with various openings, and a single-storey piggery with two walled enclosures and feeding troughs.	II
Park Farmhouse; 53.06823°N 1.67313°W		18th century	The farmhouse is in limestone with gritstone dressings, quoins, a moulded eaves cornice, and a hipped slate roof with lead ridges. There are three storeys and three bays. In the centre is a round-headed doorway with imposts, a semicircular fanlight, and a stepped keystone. The windows are sashes, and in front of the house, a wall encloses a square garden.	II
Whitemeadow Farmhouse; 53.07452°N 1.70456°W	—	Late 18th century	The farmhouse was extended in the 19th century. The original part is in limestone, the extensions are in brick, and the roof is tiled. There are two storeys, a range of five bays, a projecting gabled extension, and a single-bay extension to the northwest. The windows in the original part are mullioned, and in the extensions they are casements with arched heads.	II
The Old Parsonage; 53.07108°N 1.69062°W		Late 18th century	The parsonage, later a private house, is in limestone with gritstone dressings, an extension in brick, and a tile roof. There are two storeys and five bays. In the centre is a two-storey rectangular bay window with five-light mullioned windows, and to the west is a doorway with a bracketed canopy. The windows in the original part are sashes, and in the extension they are mullioned.	II
Outbuilding east of Whitemeadow Farmhouse; 53.07441°N 1.70428°W	—	Early 19th century	The outbuilding is in limestone with gritstone dressings, the gable wall is in brick, and the roof is tiled. There are two storeys and a long range. It contains stable doors with large lintels, doorways, and a ventilation grill. In the upper floor are two pairs of double doors with quoined surrounds. There is a brick extension to the south, and the outbuilding is linked to the house by a lower stone addition.	II
Stables, Bradbourne Hall; 53.07166°N 1.68981°W	—	19th century	The former stables are in limestone with gritstone dressings and a tile roof. There are two storeys, four bays, and a single-storey range to the east. The openings have brick arches, in the ground floor are two garage doors, and on the roof is a pyramidal louvred vent.	II
Outbuildings, Bradbourne Mill; 53.06615°N 1.70124°W		19th century	The outbuildings are in limestone with gritstone dressings, and a tile roof with a stone ridge, moulded gable copings and kneelers. The central block has two storeys and steps leading to a central doorway, to the north is a single-storey range of stables with two doors, and to the south is a three-bay single-storey cartshed with square piers.	II
