= Albert Hartshorne =

English archaeologist (1839–1910)

Albert Hartshorne (15 November 1839 – 8 December 1910) was an English archaeologist.

== Early life and education ==
Hartshorne was born in 1839 in Cogenhoe, Northamptonshire, the son of rector and antiquarian Charles Henry Hartshorne and Frances Margaretta, daughter of clergyman Thomas Kerrich. He was educated initially at Westminster School, before undertaking further study in France and Germany.

== Career ==
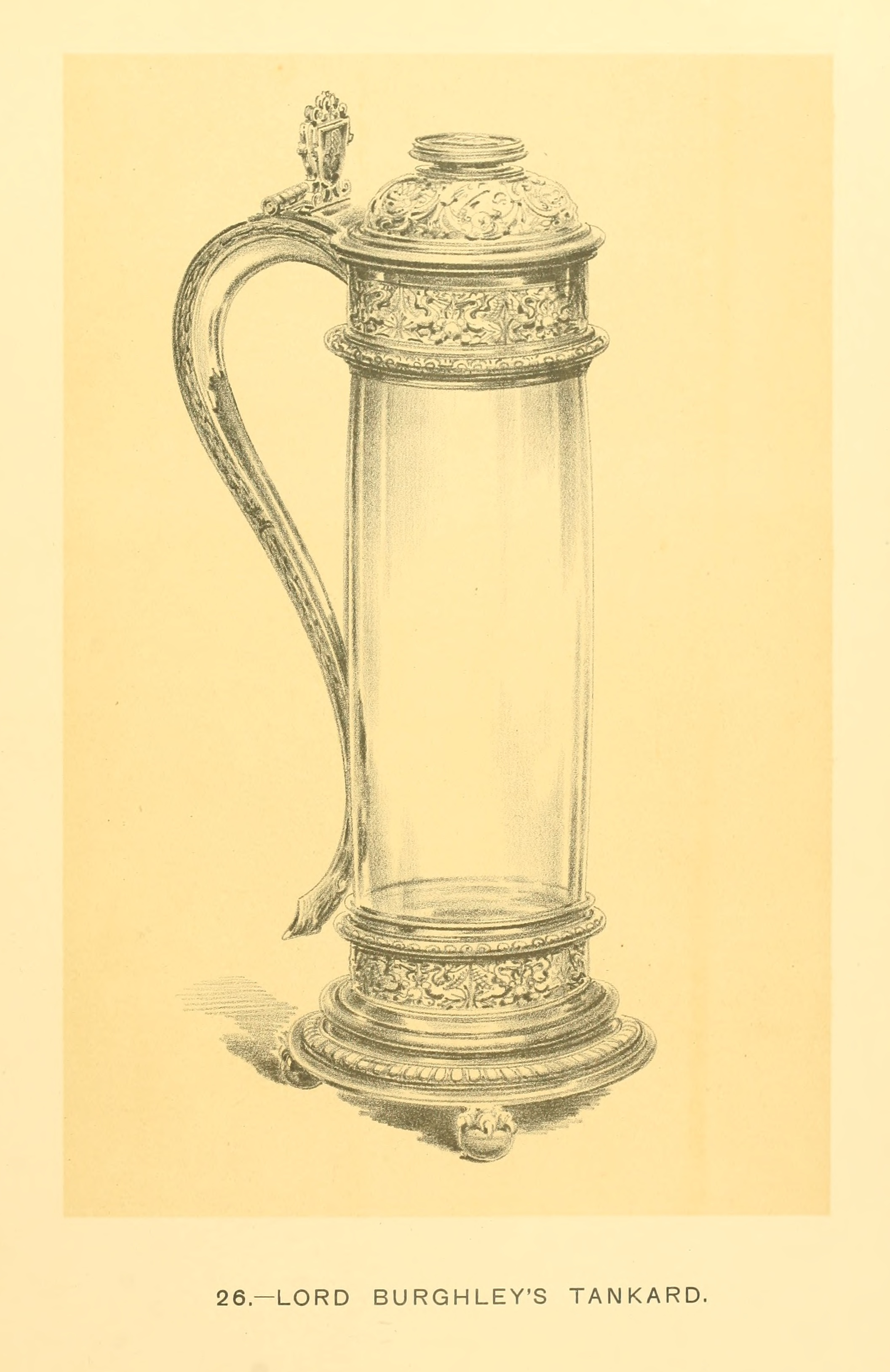
Lord Burghley's Tankard, from Old English Glasses

Hartshorne developed a particular interest in church monuments, publishing The Recumbent Monumental Effigies in Northamptonshire between 1867 and 1876. His other work included Old English Glasses (1897), which explored the history of drinking glasses up to the end of the eighteenth century.

In 1876, Hartshorne was appointed secretary of the Royal Archaeological Institute of Great Britain and Ireland, a post in which he served two terms, from 1876 to 1883 and 1886 to 1894. Between 1878 and 1892, he was also the editor of the Institute's Archaeological Journal. In 1882, he was made a fellow of the Society of Antiquaries of London, serving on its council, as well as acting as the local secretary for Derbyshire.

Hartshorne married Constance Amelia in 1872, the youngest daughter of an Irish cleric.Kelly's Directory notes Hartshorne as the resident of Bradbourne Hall, in Derbyshire in 1891. Constance died there in 1901, and Albert would live at Bradbourne Hall until his death in 1910. The couple did not have any children.

== Published works ==
=== Books ===
- The Recumbent Effigies of Northamptonshire (1867-1876)
- Hanging in chains (History of capital punishment) (1893)
- Old English Glasses (1897)

=== Articles and essays ===
- "Dover Castle", The Architect, 1 (1869), pp. 161–163.
- "The Great Barn, Harmondsworth", Transactions of the London and Middlesex Archaeological Society, 4 (1873), pp. 417–18.
- "Observations upon Certain Monumental Effigies in the West of England, particularly in the Neighbourhood of Cheltenham", Transactions of the Bristol and Gloucestershire Archaeological Society, 4 (1879), pp. 231–247.
- "Notes on Collars of SS", Archaeological Journal (1882), pp. 376–383.
- The Sword Belts of the Middle Ages, Archaeological Journal 48 (1891), pp. 320–340.
- "English Effigies in Wood" (in 2 parts), The Portfolio (1894) 177-182 and 202-208.

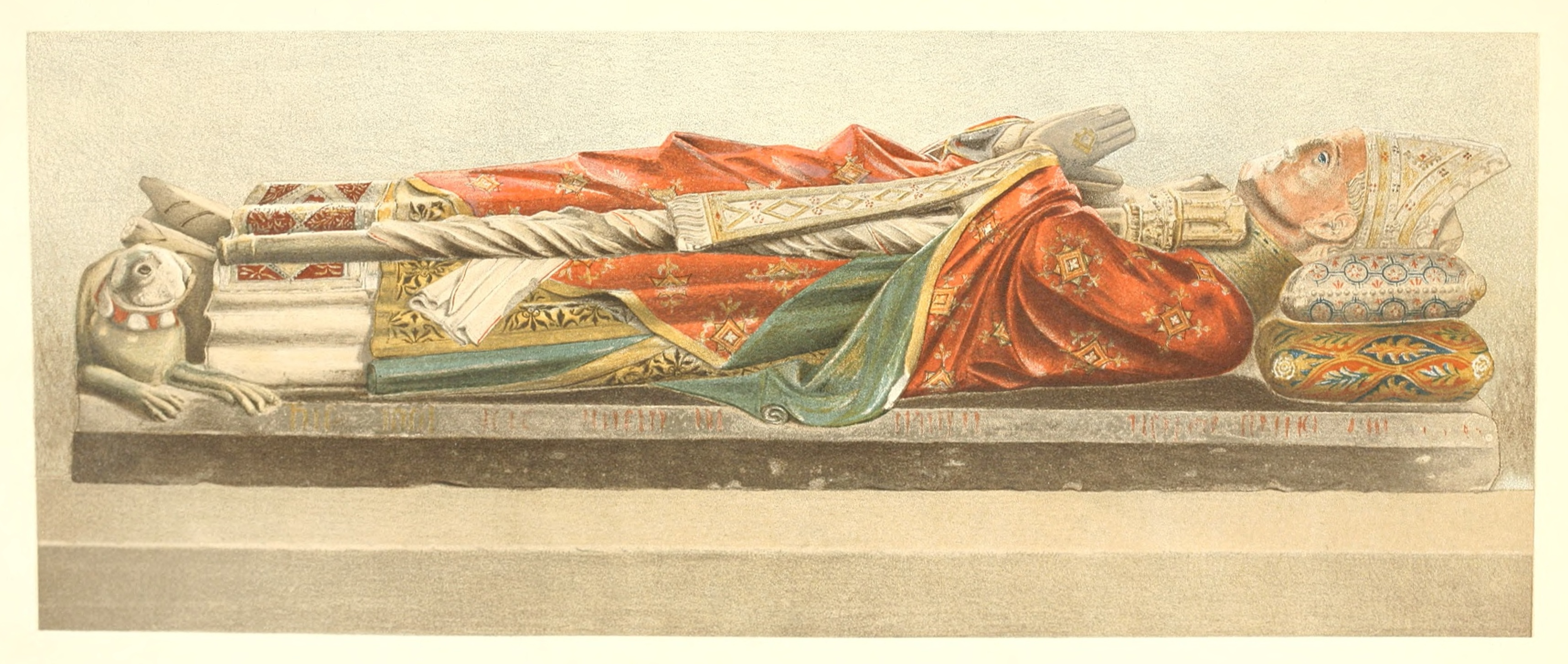

John de Sheppey, Bishop of Rochester (died 1360). From "English Effigies in Wood".
