= Woodeaves Canal =

Privately owned canal near Ashbourne, Derbyshire, England

Coordinates: 53.0525°N 1.7176°W

Specifications
- Length: 1.25 miles (2.01 km)
- Locks: 0
- Status: infilled

History
- Date completed: 1802
- Date closed: c. 1846

Geography
- Start point: Woodeaves Mill
- End point: Bradbourne Brook

The Woodeaves Canal (sometimes hyphenated as Wood-Eaves) was a short, privately owned canal near Ashbourne, Derbyshire, England. It was a short waterway, isolated from the rest of the United Kingdom canal network.

In 1784 a cotton mill was constructed near Fenny Bentley, about 2 miles (3.2 km) north of Ashbourne. The mill owners, Philip Waterfield, John Matchitt and John Cooper, negotiated a lease with landowner, Samuel Haslam, to construct a canal from the Bradbourne Brook to the mill. The canal was primarily designed to provide a water supply for the mill but under the terms of the lease, the mill owners could dig for limestone along the line of the canal and the waterway was used for transporting the stone.

The canal opened in 1802 and was approximately 1.25 miles (2.01 km) in length. Although the mill continued in operation until 1908 the canal was believed to have fallen into disuse by 1846.
