= Bentley Brook, Bradbourne =

Bentley Brook
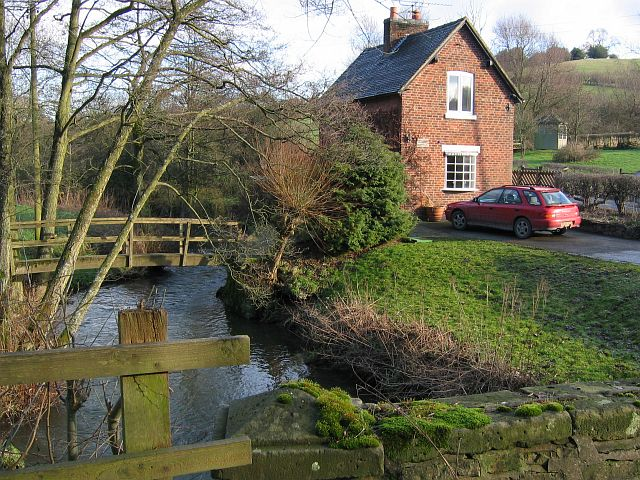
- Bentley Brook at Woodeaves

- Confluence with the River Dove shown in Derbyshire

Location
- Country: England
- Counties: Derbyshire

Physical characteristics
- Source
  - location: Brassington, Derbyshire
  - coordinates: 53.0819°N 1.664°W
- Mouth
  - location: Mayfield, Derbyshire
  - coordinates: 53.0133°N 1.7627°W
- Length: 14.5 km (9.0 mi)
- Basin size: 63 km^{2} (24 sq mi)

Basin features
- Tributaries
  - left: Brackendale Brook, Winn Brook, Bradley Dumble
  - right: Bletch Brook, Wash Brook
- Progression : Bentley Brook—Dove—Trent—Humber

The Bentley Brook or Bradbourne Brook is a small tributary of the River Dove in Derbyshire, England, and is 14.5 kilometres (9 miles) long

== Name ==
In the upper reaches it is known as the Haverhill Dale brook, becoming the Bradbourne brook after it is joined by the Bletch brook, it is in the lower reaches that it is named the Bentley brook.

== Course ==
The source of the brook is to the south of Brassington, and it flows generally south-west, passing the village of Bradbourne and its former mill, where it meets the Bletch brook. Downstream of this confluence it continues south-west until it reaches Woodeaves then Fenny Bentley, and passes the Bentley Brook Inn. It then turns directly south, and after passing to the north of Ashbourne, it joins the River Dove near the village of Mayfield.

== Mills ==
The water powered corn mill at Bradbourne is considered to be the oldest surviving watermill in Derbyshire; it was built in 1726 and continued in operation until the 1920s. The three storey mill had a unique system of twin overshot waterwheels which were some 12 feet (4 metres) in diameter. The waterwheels and mill pond were restored, as part of the renovation and conversion of the building for residential use in 2008.

There was another mill which was originally powered by the brook at Woodeaves, a hamlet near Fenny Bentley, known as the Tattersall Cotton Mill it was built in 1784. It was a cotton doubling mill and employed around 100 workers, water from the brook being brought to the mill via a long mill fleam called the Woodeaves Canal. It was latterly powered by a steam engine, with the majority of the mill being demolished in the early 20th century.

The geology of the catchment is a mixture of carboniferous limestone, gritstone and shale, and it has an area of 63 square kilometres (24 square miles). The brook has been designated as a main river by the Environment Agency from Fenny Bentley to its confluence with the Dove.

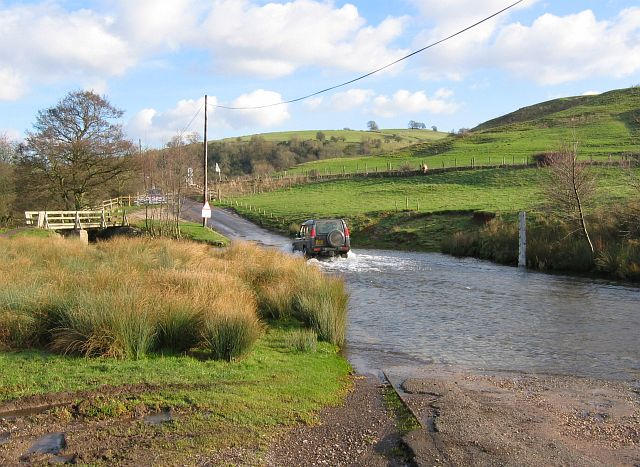
Ford through the brook on the road to Tissington
