= The Church of the Holy and Undivided Trinity, Edale =

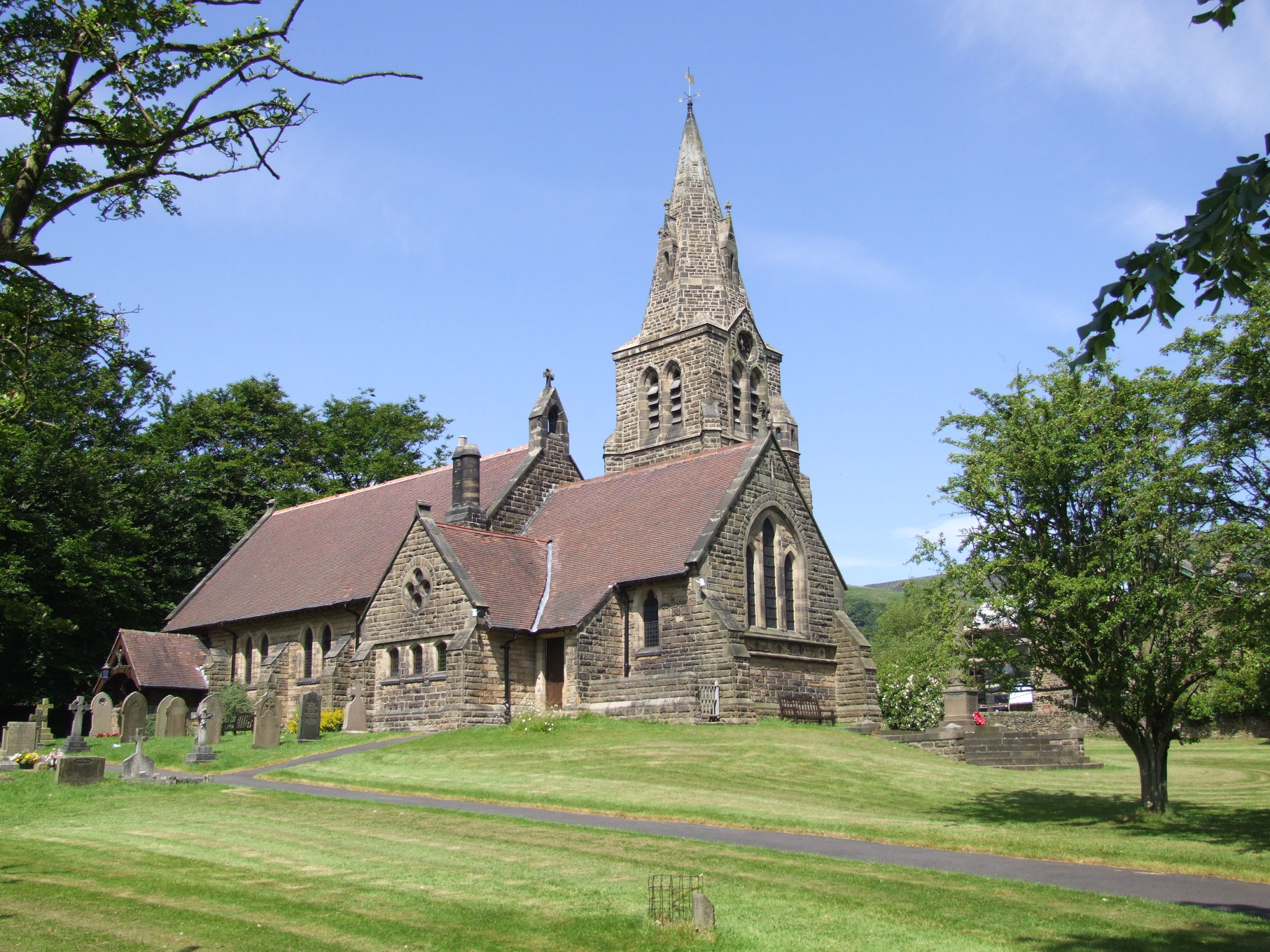
- The Church of the Holy and Undivided Trinity, Edale
- The Church of the Holy and Undivided Trinity, Edale
- 53°22′6.6″N 1°48′56.52″W
- OS grid reference: SK 12322 85769
- Location: Edale
- Country: England
- Denomination: Church of England

History
- Dedication: Holy Trinity
- Consecrated: 23 June 1886

Architecture
- Heritage designation: Grade II listed
- Architect: William Dawes
- Style: Decorated Gothic
- Groundbreaking: 22 May 1885
- Completed: 25 October 1889
- Construction cost: £2,960

Specifications
- Capacity: 210 persons
- Height: 88 feet (27 m)

Administration
- Province: Canterbury
- Diocese: Diocese of Derby
- Archdeaconry: Chesterfield
- Deanery: Bakewell and Eyam
- Parish: Edale

The Church of the Holy and Undivided Trinity, Edale, is a Grade II listed parish church in the Church of England in Edale, Derbyshire.

== History ==
The church replaced a 17th-century chapel that stood across the road within the old graveyard. The earlier church was built in 1633 and consecrated on Trinity Sunday 1634 by Rt. Revd. Robert Wright, the Bishop of Coventry and Lichfield. It was rebuilt on the same site in 1812. Originally a part of the parish of Castleton, it became a parish in its own right in 1863.

The current church was built between 1885 and 1886 to the designs of architect William Dawes of Manchester in the Decorated Gothic style. The contractor for the church was Mr Thomas Beck of Matlock Bridge. The foundation stone was laid on 22 May 1885 by Lord Edward Cavendish and the building was consecrated on 23 June 1886 by George Ridding, the Bishop of Southwell.

The tower, rising to a height of 88 feet (27 m) (excluding the weather vane), was completed in 1889 by the contractor Hill of Litton, Derbyshire, and the dedication of the new church took place on 25 October 1889. It was constructed for a cost of £2,960 (equivalent to £328,857 in 2025). The stained glass in the northeasternmost window in memory of Elizabeth Margaret Champion (d 14 Dec 1898) in the nave is by Sir John Ninian Comper and dates from 1905. The east window (1896), is also by Comper, a memorial to a former vicar, the Revd John Champion.

== Organ ==
The church contains a pipe organ by Albert Keates of Sheffield dating from 1936. A specification of the organ can be found on the National Pipe Organ Register.

== See also ==
- Listed buildings in Edale
- Edale War Memorial, located in the churchyard

== Gallery ==
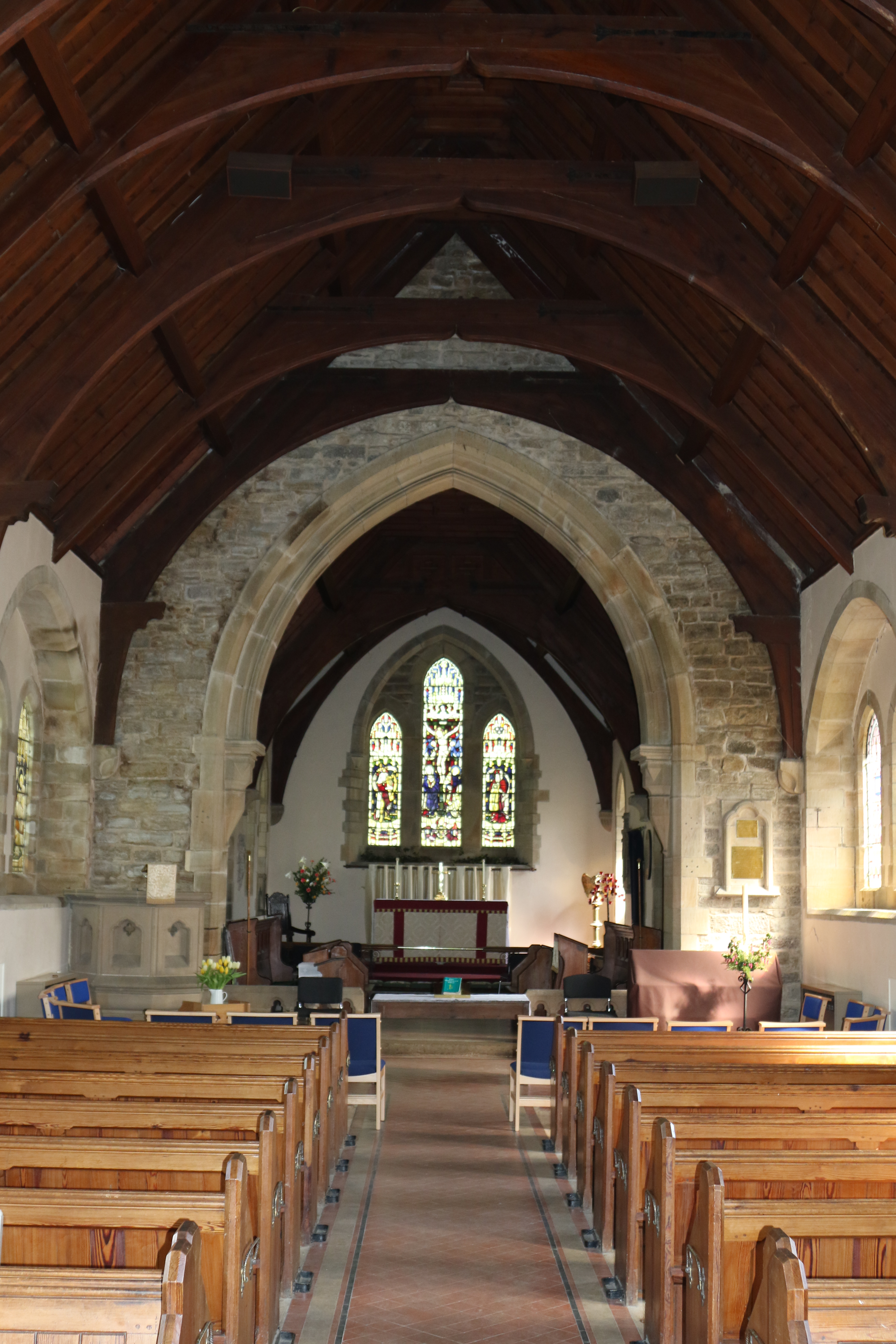
Nave and chancel

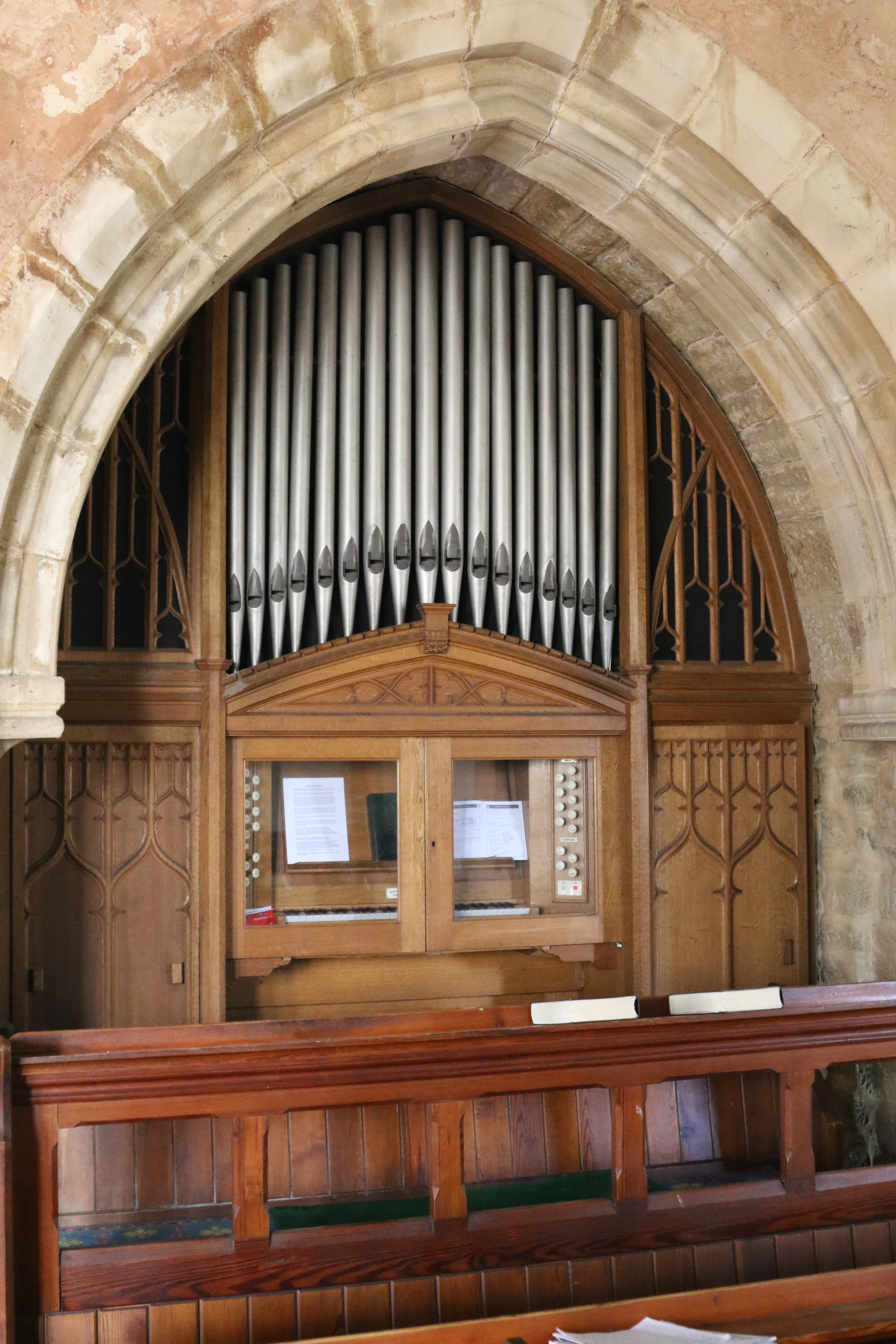
The organ

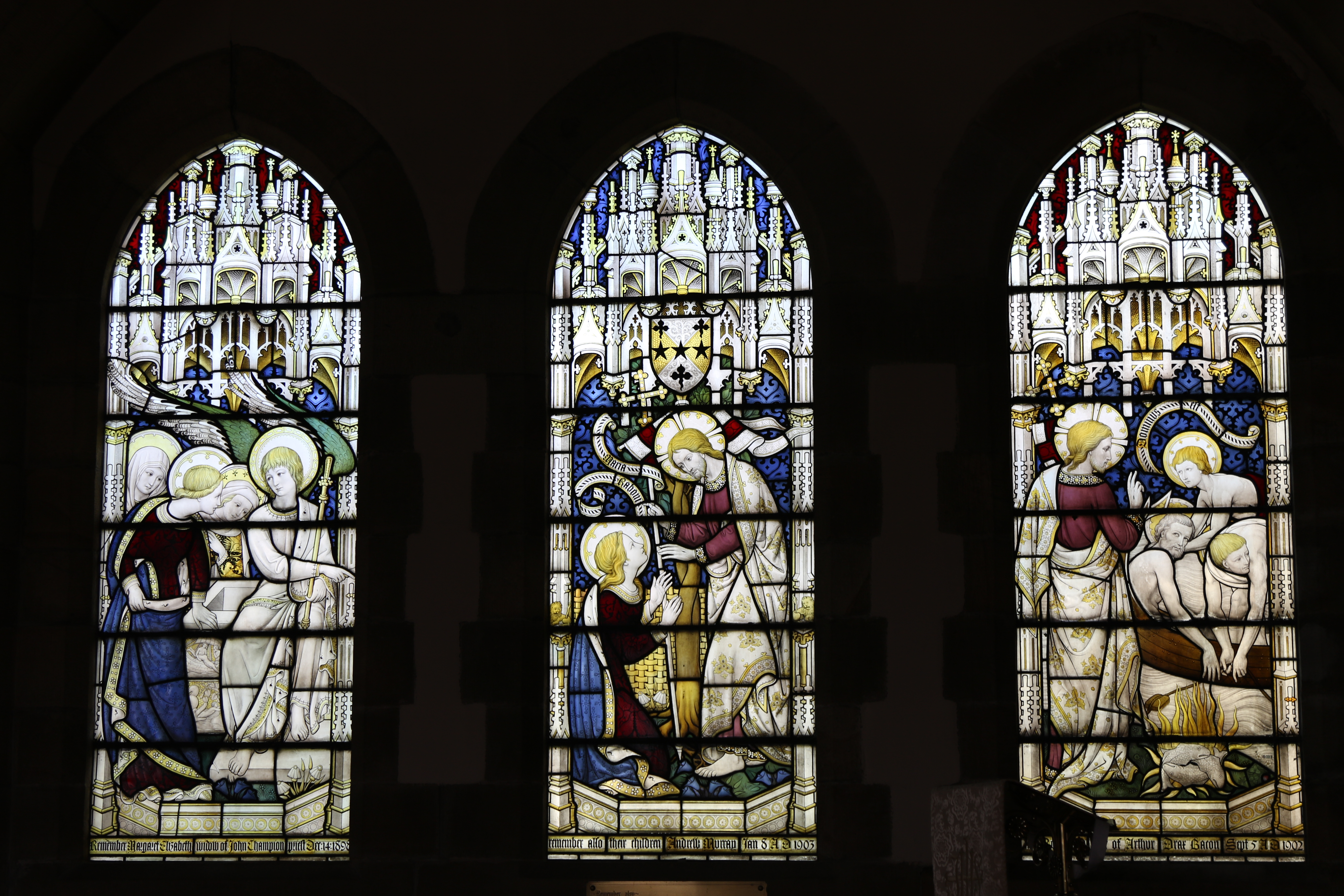
Window by Sir John Ninian Comper, 1905

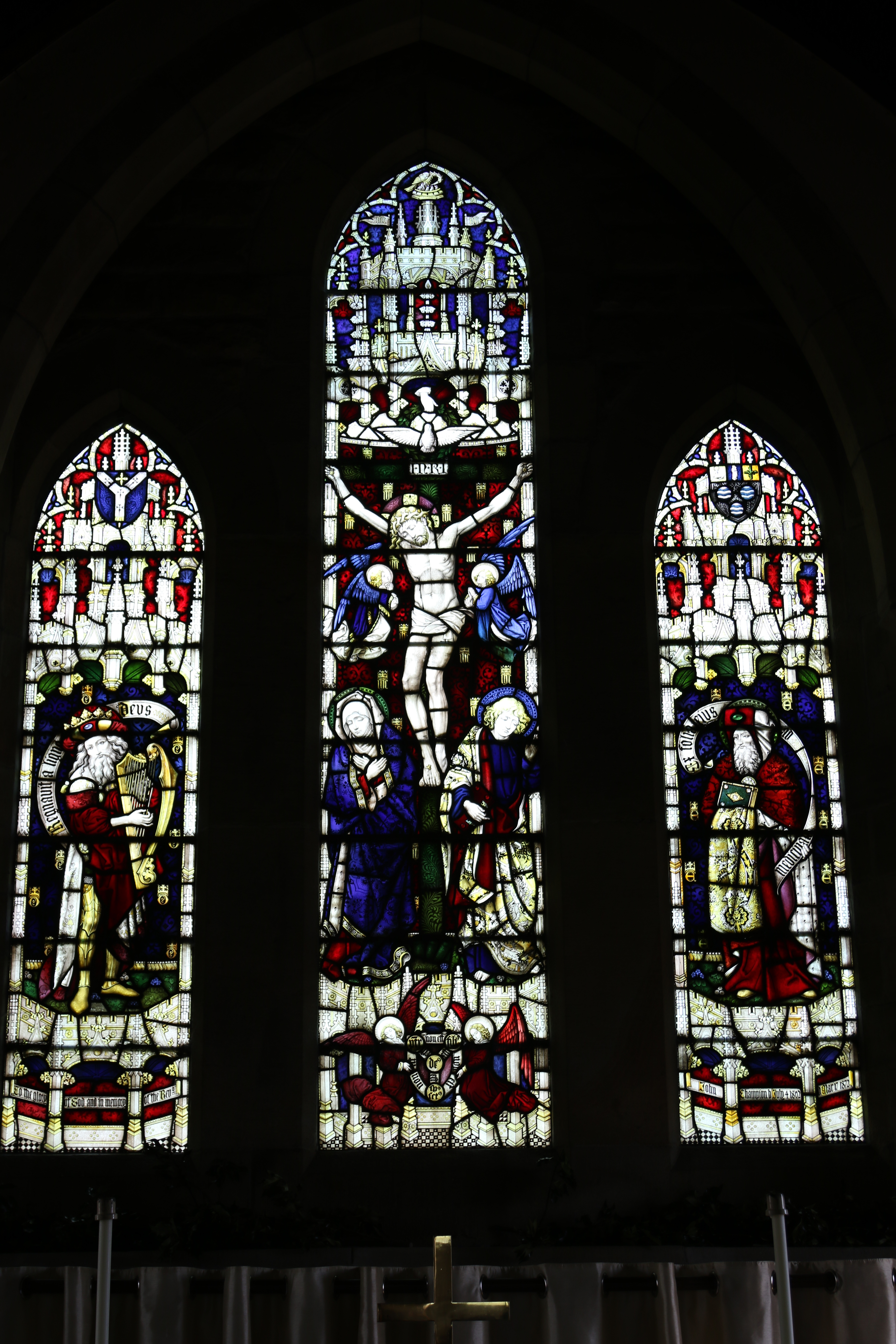
East window
