= All Saints' Church, Bradbourne =

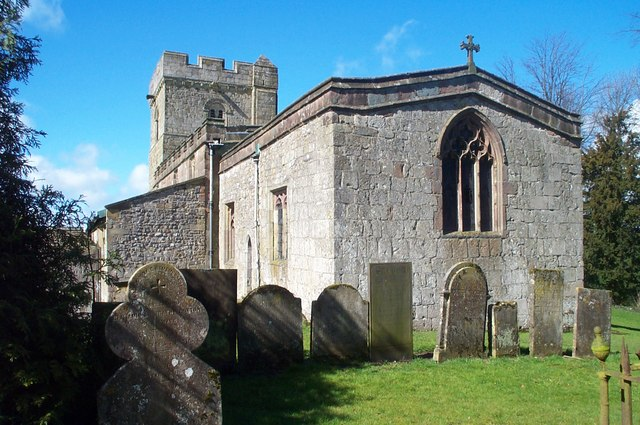
- All Saints' Church, Bradbourne
- All Saints' Church, Bradbourne
- 53°04′16.08″N 1°41′27.65″W
- OS grid reference: SK 20807 52756
- Location: Bradbourne, Derbyshire
- Country: England
- Denomination: Church of England

History
- Dedication: All Saints

Architecture
- Heritage designation: Grade I listed

Administration
- Province: Canterbury
- Diocese: Derby
- Archdeaconry: Chesterfield
- Deanery: Wirksworth
- Parish: Bradborne

All Saints' Church, Bradbourne is a Grade I listed parish church in the Church of England in Bradbourne, Derbyshire.

== History ==
All Saints' Church was adopted as the village church after the dissolution of the monasteries. It was formerly Bradbourne Priory.

By 1627 the church at Bradbourne was in need of serious repairs, with a greatly decayed roof and decaying timbers, lead, windows and bells, all estimated as costing around £46 (equivalent to £10,627 in 2025) to repair or replace (almost 3 years' average craftsman's wages). On 10 February 1629, Thomas Buxton and Vincent Sexton, churchwardens of Bradbourne, took a suit to the Chancery against William Cokayne, Valentine Jackson and four others living at the nearby village of Atlow, declaring it an ancient custom for all the parishioners of Atlow to pay for the repair of the parish church at Bradbourne, but that they had not been paying it. The following year the court decided that the inhabitants of Atlow were to pay annually 5s. 6d. per oxgang (15 acres) to Bradbourne for repairs; but they were not to be charged for any previous arrears.

In the restoration of 1876–77 the nave wall on the north side was in danger of falling outwards and it was repaired largely with Bath stone. A new organ chamber was built out. The chancel was re-fitted and furnished with a stone reredos, inlaid with encaustic slabs with scriptural scenes. The chancel floor was re-laid with Minton tiles. Jones and Willis of Birmingham supplied the lectern, lamp-standards and altar cloths. The alterations were overseen by the architect, Robinson of Derby.

The church was restored in 1906–09. The south aisle, chancel and parts of the tower were underpinned. the aisle walls and gable of the porch was rebuilt. A new oak roof covered with lead was placed on the south aisle, and a new roof on the porch was covered with slates. A new pulpit was presented, and the sanctuary was paved with Hopton stone and Derbyshire marble from the Ashford Dale Quarry which was opened especially for this work. The cost of the restoration amounted to £1,100 (equivalent to £113,205 in 2025) and was supervised by the architects Naylor and Sale of Derby.

Film actor Alan Bates (died 2003) is buried in the churchyard.

== Parish status ==
The church is in a joint parish with

- All Saints' Church, Alderwasley
- St James the Apostle's Church, Bonsall
- All Saints' Church, Ballidon
- St James' Church, Brassington
- St Margaret's Church, Carsington
- All Saints' Church, Elton
- St James' Church, Idridgehay
- Holy Trinity Church, Kirk Ireton
- Holy Trinity Church, Middleton-by-Wirksworth
- St Mary's Church, Wirksworth

== Organ ==
An organ was obtained in 1866 by Rushworth of Liverpool and installed under the tower arch. It had 5 stops on the manual compass (Open Diapason, Dulciana, Stopped diapason, Principal, Wald Flute) and a 20 note pedal board with a Double-stopped diapason. In 1877 this organ was moved into a new organ chamber. This Rushworth instrument was replaced by an organ installed by Albert Keates of Sheffield at a cost of £300 (equivalent to £33,330 in 2025) in 1893. A specification of the organ can be found on the National Pipe Organ Register.

== Bells ==
The church tower contains a ring of six bells. The treble and 2nd date from 1896, the 3rd and 4th of 1863, all by John Taylor of Loughborough. The 5th and tenor date from 1708 and are by Danuel Hedderly

== See also ==
- Grade I listed churches in Derbyshire
- Listed buildings in Bradbourne
