= Listed buildings in Atlow =

Atlow is a civil parish in the Derbyshire Dales district of Derbyshire, England. The parish contains five listed buildings that are recorded in the National Heritage List for England. All the listed buildings are designated at Grade II, the lowest of the three grades, which is applied to "buildings of national importance and special interest". The parish contains the village of Atlow and the surrounding countryside. The listed buildings consist of a church, a former parsonage, farmhouses, and farm buildings.

== Buildings ==
Name and location	Photograph	Date	Notes
Atlow Moat Farmhouse; 53.03412°N 1.66462°W	—	17th century	A stone farmhouse with quoins and a tile roof. There are two storeys, a front range of three bays, a two-storey two-bay wing on the west, and a single-storey outbuilding on the east. The central doorway has a moulded surround and a rectangular fanlight, and the windows on the front are sashes. At the rear are two coped gables, and the windows are mullioned.
Upper Hallfields Farmhouse; 53.03051°N 1.67399°W	—	Mid 17th century	The farmhouse is in stone and has a tile roof with coped gables, kneelers and ball finials. There are two storeys, three bays, and a single-storey west wing. On the front is a re-set gabled porch with ball finials, and most of the windows are mullioned with three lights and hood moulds.
Outbuildings, Atlow Moat Farm; 53.03451°N 1.66409°W	—	18th century	The farm buildings are in stone with quoins, a chamfered eaves cornice, and a tile roof with coped gables and kneelers. The buildings have an L-shaped plan, forming the north and east sides of a courtyard. There are two storeys, and a single storey stable at the south end. The buildings contain doorways, windows and vents, all with quoined surrounds, and the north range has an external stone staircase.
The Old Parsonage; 53.03795°N 1.65631°W	—	18th century	The house is in limestone with gritstone dressings, and a tile roof with coped gables and kneelers. There are three storeys, four bays, and a two-storey wing on the right. In the centre is a porch and a doorway, and the windows are casements.
Church of St Philip and St James; 53.03499°N 1.65766°W		1873–74	The church is in gritstone, it has a tile roof with coped gables, and is in Early English style. It consists of a nave, a south porch, and a chancel, and on the west gable is a bell turret. The windows are lancets in pairs and triplets.
