= Edale War Memorial =

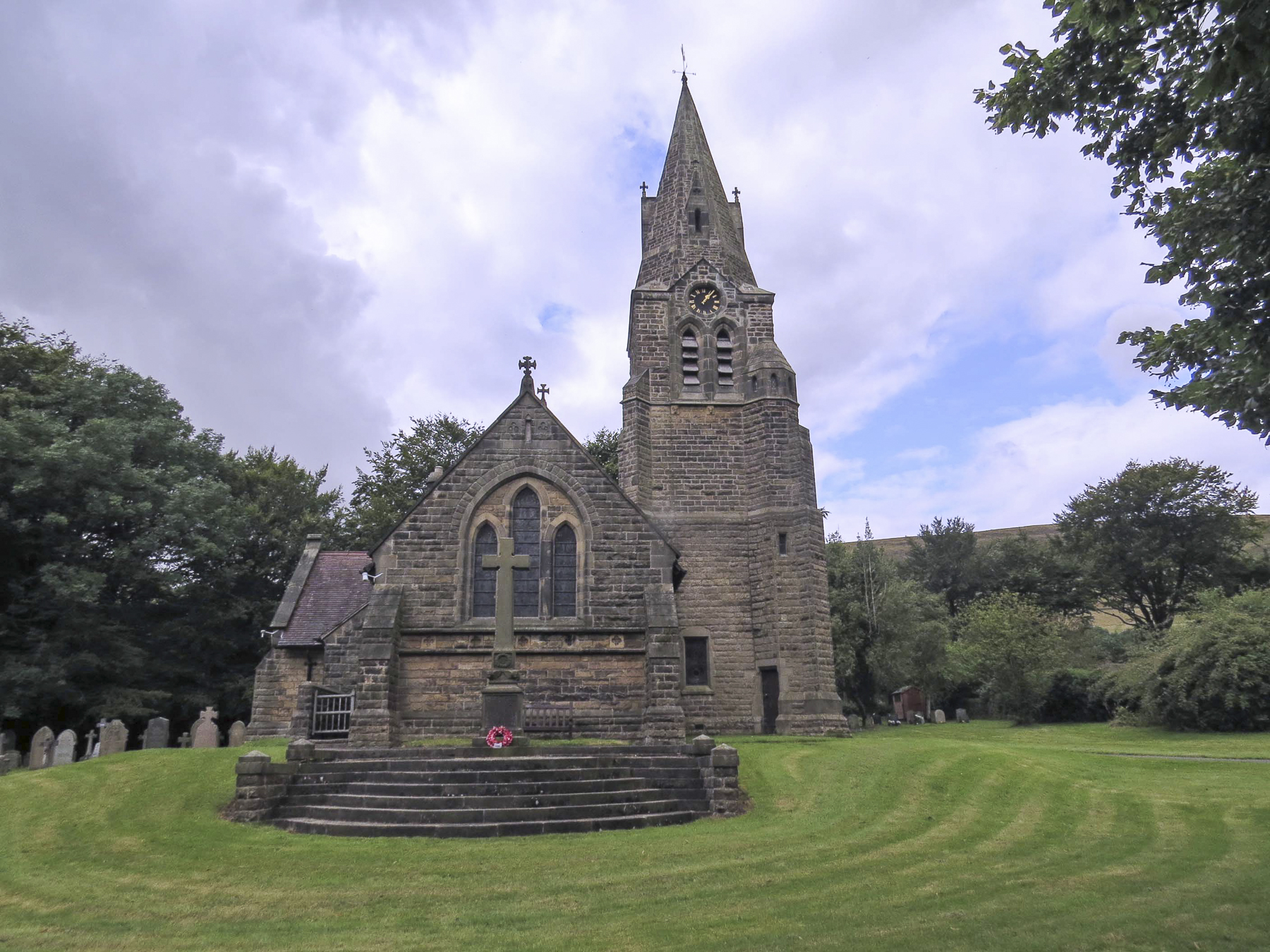
- Edale War Memorial in the Churchyard of The Church of the Holy and Undivided Trinity

- Location in Derbyshire
- 53°22′07″N 1°48′58″W
- Location: Edale, Derbyshire, England

Listed Building – Grade II
- Official name: War Memorial
- Designated: 5 November 2015
- Reference no.: 1430736

Edale War Memorial is a 20th-century grade II listed war memorial in Edale, Derbyshire.

== History ==
The war memorial features the names of local residents that died during the First World War. The memorial was later renovated following World War II.

The memorial has been Grade II listed since 5 November 2015.

== See also ==
- Listed buildings in Edale
