= Atlow =

Village in Derbyshire, England

Coordinates: 53.037°N 1.657°W

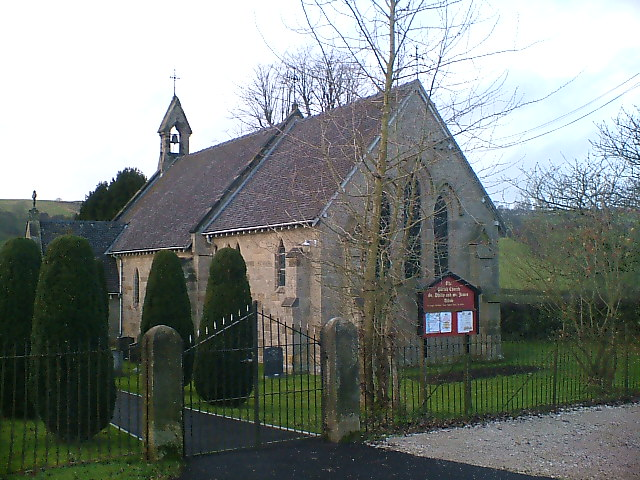
- Atlow church

- Atlow parish highlighted within Derbyshire
- Population: 98 (2001)
- OS grid reference: SK230489
- District: Derbyshire Dales
- Shire county: Derbyshire
- Region: East Midlands
- Country: England
- Sovereign state: United Kingdom
- Post town: ASHBOURNE
- Postcode district: DE6
- Police: Derbyshire
- Fire: Derbyshire
- Ambulance: East Midlands

Atlow is a village and civil parish in the Derbyshire Dales district of Derbyshire, England, about eight miles west of Belper. According to the 2001 census the parish had a population of 98. At the 2011 Census the population remained less than 100. Details are included in the civil parish of Hognaston.

== History ==
The name Atlow is derived the Old English for "Eatta's burial mound or hill". The Domesday Book lists Atlow as in the possession of Aelfric of Bradbourne in 1066 with a value of £1. By 1086 the Domesday Book records the village's value had fallen to £0.1, and was in the possession of Henry de Ferrers. The village is recorded as containing ploughland for 2, 4 acres of meadow, 0.5 leagues of woodland, and 3 furlongs of mixed measures.

Atlow was, until 1866, part of the parish of Bradbourne.

On 10 February 1629, six villagers from Atlow, including William Cokayne and Valentine Jackson, were taken to the Chancery court by two church wardens of Bradbourne. The two men claimed it an ancient custom for all the parishioners of Atlow to pay for the repair of the parish church at Bradbourne (the former Bradbourne Priory), but that the villagers had not been paying it. The following year the court decided that the inhabitants of Atlow were to pay annually 5s. 6d. per oxgang (15 acres) to Bradbourne for repairs; but they were not to be charged for any previous arrears.

In the 1868 National Gazetteer of Great Britain and Ireland, Atlow is described thus:

"It is situated in a pleasant district on the river Dove, and from a lofty hill, called Magger's Bush, not far from the village, there is a fine prospect. The living is a perpetual curacy in the diocese of Lichfield, of the value of £148, in the patronage of C. H. Oakover, Esq."

Kelly's Directory of 1891 describes the village as a scattering of farmhouses and cottages in a parish of 1,214 acres, with a population of 138, and a rateable (taxable) value of £1,649. The land is described as "clayey, loamy and limely", mainly dairy pasture, but reports that most of the parish lies atop a bed of Coal, and that both Limestone and Ironstone were "very abundant". Kelly records the rector as Rev. James Sheldon (who had held the position since 1885), the Lord of the Manor as H.C. Okeover esq. (of Okeover Hall, Staffordshire -approx 5 miles away), as the principal land owners as Mr. Twigge, a Mr. Melland, a Mr. Grundy, and a Mr. T. Tomlinson.

The National Mixed School was built in 1863 for a maximum of 60 children, but in 1891 had an average attendance of 33. The head was William Frederick Walker.

=== Parish church ===
Atlow was historically part of the parish of Bradbourne. It became an independent civil parish in 1866, at which time the rectory had a net yearly value of £150, an average tithe rent-charge of £89. The rectory (residence) itself was in gift from H.C. Okeover esq. (of Okeover Hall, Staffordshire, approximately 5 miles away) and came with 15 acres of Glebe land.

The current parish church was consecrated by George Selwyn, Bishop of Lichfield, in May 1874 and is dedicated to Saint Philip and Saint James. It was built to replace an earlier parish church, dedicated to All Saints, and was built on a plot of land between the site of the old church, and the road (recorded as Church Lane, now called Atlow Lane). The church was designed by H. I. Stevens, who died in the year before the church was consecrated. The church is built in gritstone ashlar, using the Early English style; it consists of a chancel, nave, south porch and western bell-turret. The bell-turret is described in 1891 as containing a bell from the former church, showing a monogram and date: 1595 The church is currently Grade II listed.

== See also ==
- Listed buildings in Atlow
