= Ballidon Dale =

Valley in the Derbyshire Peak District

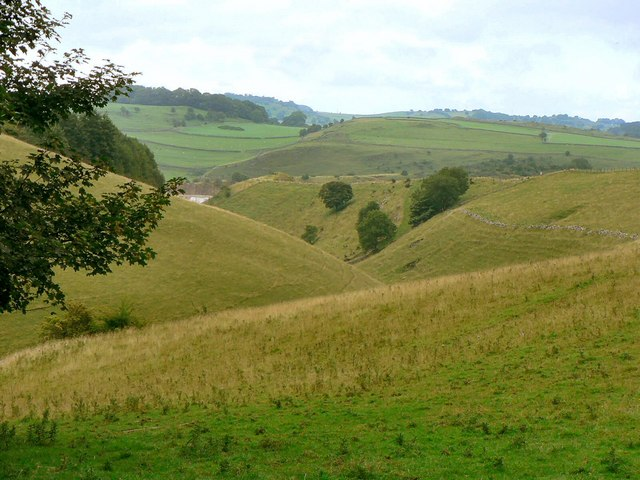
- Length: c.2.5 kilometres (1.6 mi) North-South
- Width: c.400 metres (1,312 ft)
- Depth: c.100 metres (328 ft)

Geography
- Location: Derbyshire, England
- Coordinates: 53.08813°N 1.71396°W
- Interactive map of Ballidon Dale

Ballidon Dale is a steep-sided, dry carboniferous limestone valley near Parwich in the Derbyshire Peak District of England. The ancient hamlet of Ballidon (mentioned in the Domesday Book) lies at the southern foot of the dale. Ballidon Quarry and Hoe Grange limestone quarries now dominate the west side of the dale.

The fossil-rich limestone was formed from deposits in a warm shallow sea in the Brigantian stage of the Carboniferous period (around 330 million years ago). Ballidon Dale is a designated Site of Special Scientific Interest (SSSI). The protected SSSI area covers the main broad, deep valley as well as the long dale on the west side and smaller dale from the east side. There are early purple orchid in the main dale. There is a rich variety of grasses and herbs on the dale sides. Grasses include meadow oat, parnassus, quaking grass, sheep's fescue, glaucous sedge, carnation sedge and spring sedge. Herbs include salad burnet, bird's-foot trefoil, mouse ear hawkweed, scabious, fairy flax, thyme and lady's bedstraw.

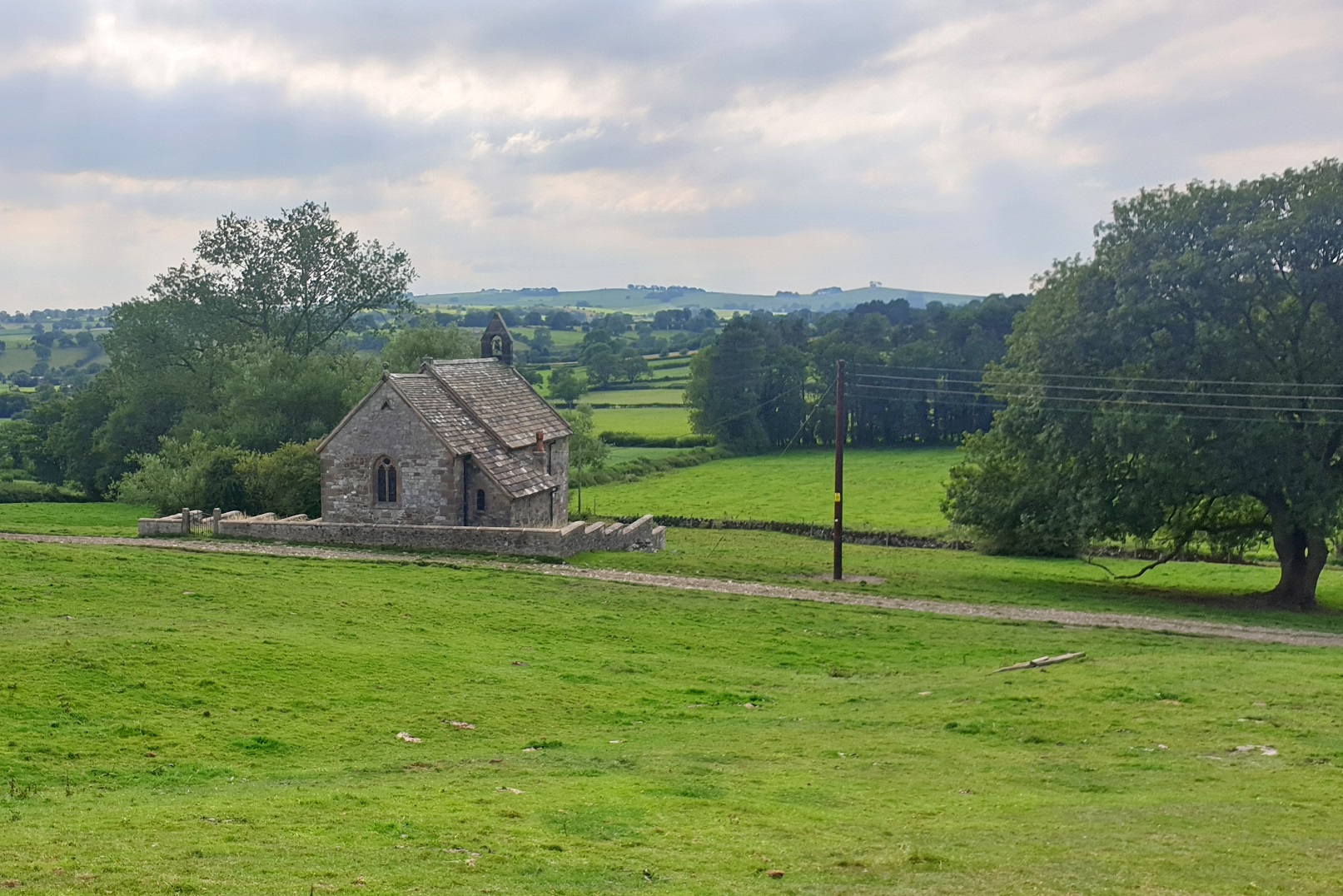
Site of medieval settlement and field system at Ballidon

There are earthworks and buried remains of a medieval settlement at the southern end of Ballidon Dale. The Anglo-Saxon estate at Ballidon was granted by King Edgar in AD 963. Field boundaries and ridge and furrow farming features are still visible. The site is a protected Scheduled Monument. The restored Anglo-Norman church on the site is a Grade II listed building.

At the head of the dale are Roystone Grange farmhouse and barn, which are Grade II listed buildings from the 18th century. The monastic grange dates from the Middle Ages, with remains of building platforms, a medieval field system and a dew pond from the Roman era lying 200m south of the present farmhouse building. The wool-producing grange was established by the Cistercian Garendon Abbey in Leicestershire in the 12th or 13th century, when the grange was recorded as 'Reevestones'. The site is a registered Scheduled Monument. Nearby are a burial barrow where remains from the Bronze Age and Romano-British pottery and metalwork have been found. The barrow and the adjacent medieval animal pen are also a designated Scheduled Monument. In the immediate surroundings are three further Scheduled Monuments of the remains of a Romano-British settlement and field system. There are remains of farmhouses, outbuildings, walled field enclosures, terraces and orthostats. Roman pottery artefacts and coins were discovered at the site.

Ballidon Dale, and Roystone Rocks at its head, are designated as 'Open Access' land for the public, following the Countryside and Rights of Way Act 2000. There is a track with public access along the length of the valley floor, with access into the dale from both ends. The Limestone Way long-distance footpath crosses the foot of the dale by the settlement of Ballidon.
