= Listed buildings in Edale =

Edale is a civil parish in the High Peak district of Derbyshire, England. The parish contains 28 listed buildings that are recorded in the National Heritage List for England. All the listed buildings are designated at Grade II, the lowest of the three grades, which is applied to "buildings of national importance and special interest". The parish is almost entirely rural, consisting of countryside and moorland, and containing small settlements including Grindsbrook Booth and Barber Booth. Most of the listed buildings are houses, cottages, farmhouses and farm buildings. The other listed buildings include a church, a chapel, a public house, a sundial, two packhorse bridges, a former cotton mill, a war memorial, and a telephone kiosk.

== Buildings ==
| Name and location | Photograph | Date | Notes |
|---|---|---|---|
| Barn opposite Methodist Chapel; 53.35970°N 1.83151°W | | Late 16th century | The barn, which was later extended, is in gritstone with a stone slate roof. There is a single storey and three bays, the eastern bay added in the 19th century. The early part has massive quoins, and two doorways, each with a chamfered surround, a cambered head, a massive lintel, and quoins; one doorway is blocked. In the later part is a square opening with quoins, slit vents, and a ball finial on the gable. Inside, there is one cruck truss. |
| The Old Nag's Head; 53.37062°N 1.81683°W | | 1577 | The public house is in gritstone, and has a stone slate roof with coped gables and moulded kneelers. There are two storeys and an irregular south front, with a 20th-century gabled stone and timber porch. Within the porch is a 16th-century doorway with a bracketed hood. The porch is flanked by full-height square bay windows with applied timber framing and gables with finials. To the right is a doorway with a dated lintel and a bracketed hood, to its right is a window with a chamfered surround, and above is a three-light mullioned window. |
| Hollins Farmhouse and barn 53.35981°N 1.80266°W | | Early 17th century | The farmhouse and attached barn are in gritstone with quoins, and a stone slate roof. There are two storeys, and an irregular front of five bays. The doorway has a quoined surround and lintel, and mullioned windows. In the barn are two doorways, a small window between them, and two square openings above. |
| Church Cottage; 53.36807°N 1.81558°W | | Mid-17th century | The cottage is in gritstone, partly rendered, with quoins, and a stone slate roof with coped gables and moulded kneelers at the east end. There are two storeys and three bays. The doorways have a stone lintel and jambs, and the windows are sashes, some with mullions. |
| Lea House; 53.37048°N 1.81707°W | | 17th century | A gritstone house with massive quoins and a stone slate roof. There are two storeys and three bays. The doorway has a rectangular fanlight, and the windows are mullioned, with a continuous hood mould over the ground floor openings. |
| Packhorse bridge, Jacob's Ladder; 53.37217°N 1.86873°W | | 17th century (possible) | The packhorse bridge carries a track over a stream. It is in gritstone, and consists of a single arch, with the stones laid as voussoirs and a projecting drip course. The parapet walls have roughly rounded coping stones. |
| Small Clough Farmhouse and barn 53.35960°N 1.82034°W | | 17th century | The farmhouse and barn are in gritstone, with quoins, a stone slate roof, and two storeys, The farmhouse to the left has three bays, and contains a doorway, mullioned windows that have been altered, and a casement window. The barn is slightly recessed, and contains a doorway and a window. |
| Waterside Cottage; 53.37079°N 1.81626°W | | 17th century | A gritstone cottage with quoins and a stone slate roof. There are two storeys and two bays, the south bay taller. On the front are two doorways, most of the windows are mullioned, and there is a sash window. |
| Dalehead Farmhouse and barn 53.35505°N 1.84945°W | | Late 17th century | The farmhouse and attached barn are in gritstone with a stone slate roof, and two storeys. The house to the left has a gabled porch with massive quoins, and a doorway with a chamfered lintel and jambs. The windows vary; some are mullioned, and at the rear is a similar doorway. The barn has large double doors. |
| Sundial in old Churchyard; 53.36804°N 1.81528°W | | Late 17th century | The sundial is in gritstone, and consists of a square pillar with chamfered angles on a circular plinth. It has a large square top with chamfered angles and a base plate, but no gnomon. |
| Tagnaze Farmhouse and barn 53.36114°N 1.85006°W | | Late 17th century | The barns, originally a farmhouse and barn, are in gritstone, with quoins, a stone slate roof, two storeys and an L-shaped plan. The former house on the left has a chamfered lintel and quoins, and mullioned windows. The barn has a cart entrance and an upper opening. |
| Crowden Lea; 53.36457°N 1.84649°W | | Early 18th century | A gritstone house with quoins, and a tile roof with coped gables and moulded kneelers. There are two storeys and three bays. On the front is a lean-to porch, and the windows are mullioned. |
| Edale End Farmhouse and barn 53.37461°N 1.76008°W | | Early 18th century | The farmhouse and barn are in gritstone with quoins, a stone slate roof, and two storeys. The house on the right has a central doorway with a chamfered surround, quoins and a lintel, and the windows are mullioned. The barn has four doorways, two with massive lintels, and windows. |
| Gibraltar Bridge; 53.37099°N 1.81614°W | | 18th century | A packhorse bridge crossing Grinds Brook, it is in gritstone, and consists of a single round arch. The bridge has voussoirs, and parapets with chamfered copings, splayed out at the ends. |
| The Warren and cottage 53.37065°N 1.81658°W | | 18th century or earlier | The house and cottage are in gritstone with quoins, a stone slate roof, and two storeys. Originally there are three bays, and three bays were added later. The original doorway has a moulded surround, a pulvinated frieze, and a segmental pediment, above which is a bull's eye window with a moulded surround. In the later part is a doorway with a massive surround and lintel, and a doorway with a bracketed canopy. Most of the windows are sashes, and at the rear is a three-light mullioned window. |
| Ollerbrook Farmhouse; 53.36977°N 1.80892°W | | 1770 | The farmhouse is in gritstone with quoins, and a stone slate roof with coped gables and moulded kneelers. There are two storeys, a double-range plan, a front of three bays, and a recessed bay to the east. The central doorway has a moulded architrave, a keystone and a pediment on brackets, and the windows are mullioned. |
| Carr Bank; 53.37128°N 1.81654°W | | Late 18th century | A pair of cottages, later combined, the building is in gritstone with quoins and a stone slate roof. There are two storeys and three bays. It contains two doorways, and most of the windows are mullioned. |
| Grindslow House; 53.37375°N 1.81938°W | | Late 18th century | The house is in gritstone, and has a stone slate roof with coped gables. There are two storeys and attics, and a front of five bays, the middle bay gabled. The central doorway has a segmental arch and side lights, and in the right bay is a two-storey canted bay window. Most of the other windows are sashes, some with mullions, in the gable is an ogee-arched lancet window, and in the roof are two gabled dormers. |
| Ivy House; 53.36006°N 1.83131°W | | Late 18th century | A gritstone house with quoins, moulded eaves corbels, and a stone slate roof. There are two storeys and three bays. The central doorway has a stone lintel and quoins, and the windows are mullioned, with three lights in the ground floor and two in the upper floor. |
| Sycamore Cottage; 53.37096°N 1.81758°W | | Late 18th century | The house is in sandstone with a tile roof, two storeys and two bays. The doorway has a stone surround, and the windows are sashes. |
| The Mill and chimney 53.36546°N 1.79960°W | | Late 18th century | A cotton mill converted into flats, it is in gritstone with Welsh slate roofs. It consists of a four-storey main block, a projecting block with two storeys and attics, and a wall connecting with the chimney. The south front has 13 bays, with a square staircase tower, and a separate U-shaped staircase tower. The mill contains a doorway, three cart entrances, and sash windows with lintels and keystones, and in the east gable end is a lunette. The chimney is square and tapering, and has eleven string courses. |
| The Old Parsonage; 53.37157°N 1.81760°W | | Late 18th century | A gritstone house with a stone slate roof, two storeys, a double-range plan, and a front of four bays, the second bay projecting and gabled. The doorway has a semicircular head and a fanlight, and the windows are sashes, one with a mullion. |
| Edale House; 53.36529°N 1.80013°W | | c. 1800 | The house is in gritstone with facing in red brick on the front, and a roof of Welsh slate and stone slate. There are two storeys and a front of three bays, with a narrower bay recessed at the southwest. On the front is a central porch, a canted bay window, and sash windows, and at the rear are casement windows with wedge lintels. |
| Methodist Chapel, Barber Booth; 53.36005°N 1.83152°W | | 1811 | The chapel is in gritstone with quoins, moulded eaves corbels, and a stone slate roof. There are two storeys, two bays, and a later single-storey bay to the west. Above the doorway is an inscribed datestone, and the windows are small-paned with casements. |
| Manor House; 53.35672°N 1.83537°W | — | Early 19th century | A farmhouse in gritstone, with a stone slate roof, two storeys, and a double-depth plan. In the centre is a doorway with a moulded surround and a semicircular fanlight. It is flanked by Venetian windows in both floors, and between the upper windows is a datestone. At the rear is a sash window and later windows. |
| Holy Trinity Church; 53.36867°N 1.81616°W | | 1885–86 | The church, with the tower completed in 1890, is in gritstone with tile roofs, and is in Early English style. It consists of a nave, a south porch, a chancel with a north vestry, and a northeast steeple. The steeple has a tower with three stages, diagonal buttresses, the northeast buttress incorporating a polygonal stair turret, paired lancet bell openings, and a broach spire containing lucarnes with cross finials. On the east gable of the nave is a bellcote. |
| Edale War Memorial; 53.36869°N 1.81592°W | | c. 1920 | The war memorial is in the churchyard of Holy Trinity Church to the east of the chancel. It is in York stone, and consists of a Latin cross on a square plinth on a base of two steps. On the front and back of the cross are caved wreaths, and on the base are winged cherubs. The memorial stands on a dais approached by seven semicircular steps, and is enclosed by retaining walls. On the plinth are metal plaques with inscriptions, and the names of those lost in the two World Wars. |
| Telephone kiosk 53.37029°N 1.81674°W | | 1935 | The K6 type telephone kiosk in Grindsbrook was designed by Giles Gilbert Scott. Constructed in cast iron with a square plan and a dome, it has three unperforated crowns in the top panels. |
