= All Saints Church, Ballidon =

Coordinates: 53.0867°N 1.6970°W

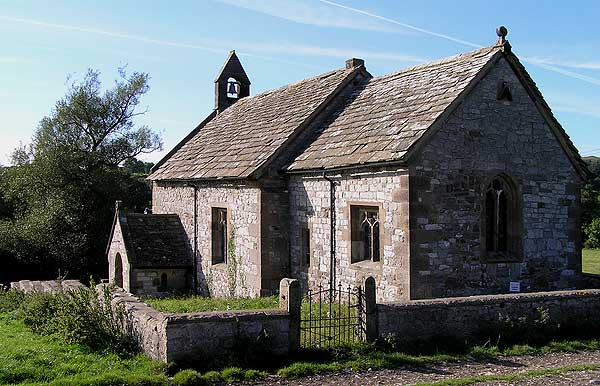
- All Saints Church, Ballidon. from the southeast

- Location in Derbyshire
- OS grid reference: SK 2039 5443
- Location: Ballidon, Derbyshire
- Country: England
- Denomination: Anglican

Architecture
- Functional status: Redundant
- Heritage designation: Grade II
- Designated: 13 September 1967
- Architectural type: Church
- Style: Norman, Gothic

Specifications
- Materials: Limestone with gritstone dressings Stone slate roof

All Saints Church is a redundant Anglican church located to the south of the village of Ballidon, Derbyshire, England. It is recorded in the National Heritage List for England as a designated Grade II listed building, and is under the care of the Friends of Friendless Churches.

== History ==
The church dates originally from the 12th century. Over the centuries the building has been partly rebuilt or restored, including in 1822 and in 1882. The last service in the church took place on 18 April 2003. It was vested in the Friends of Friendless Churches during 2011.

== Architecture ==
All Saints is constructed in limestone with grit-stone dressings, and it has a stone slate roof. Its plan consists of two cells, the nave and the chancel, with a south porch and a north vestry. At the west end is a gabled bellcote. On the south side of the church are square-headed windows, and at the east end is a two-light window; all of these contain Decorated-style tracery. At the west end is a lancet window. In the north wall is a blocked doorway. The south doorway is Norman, but has been much restored. Inside the church is a Neo-Norman chancel arch. The font is Perpendicular in style, with crude carving. In the south wall above the font is an old fireplace, which suggests that there may have once been a room at a higher level. The east window contains stained glass dated 1883.
