= Albert Keates =

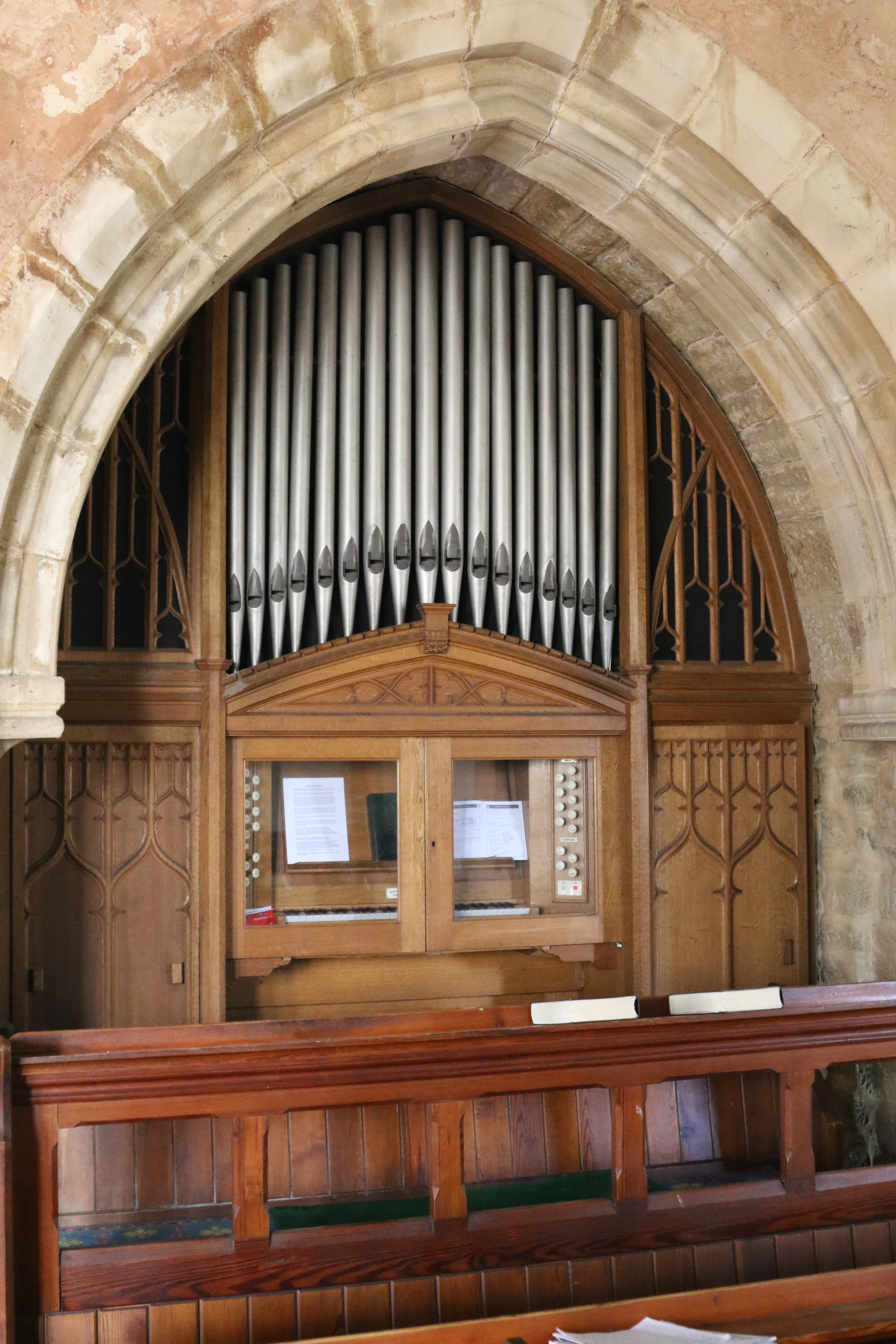
The Keates organ in The Church of the Holy and Undivided Trinity, Edale

Albert Keates (14 July 1862 in Hanley, Staffordshire – 25 June 1949 in Sheffield) was a pipe organ builder based in Sheffield who flourished between 1889 and 1948.

== Career ==
He started his employment at John Stringer and Co in Hanley. Later he progressed to become head voicer at Brindley & Foster in Sheffield.

In 1885 he formed the partnership Lowe and Keates with Edwin Lowe, but this was short-lived, being dissolved on 8 October 1888, and in 1889 he formed his own business, based in a premises on Charlotte Road in Sheffield, which built some 90 new organs and also some restorations.

He was influenced by the German organ builder, Johann Friedrich Schulze, and adopted his style in the manufacture of Diapasons, which give Keates organs their distinctive tone.

The largest organ built by the company was in 1931 for Uppingham School, which had 44 stops and 3 manuals.

In 1950 the company was absorbed into Harris Organs in Birmingham.
