= Bradbourne =

Village in Derbyshire, England

Coordinates: 53.071°N 1.688°W

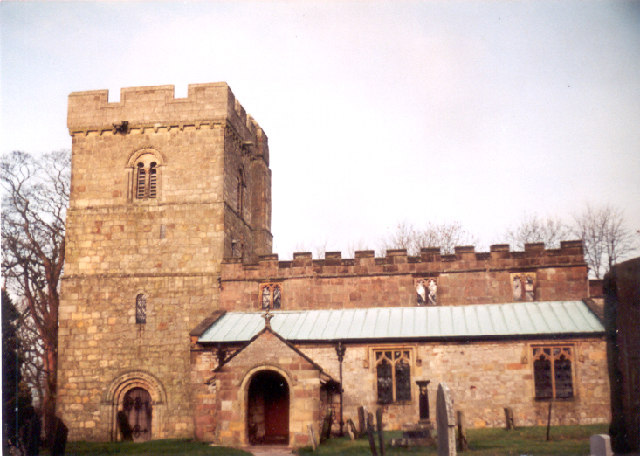
- All Saints Church, Bradbourne

- Bradbourne parish highlighted within Derbyshire
- Population: 117 (2011)
- OS grid reference: SK210526
- District: Derbyshire Dales
- Shire county: Derbyshire
- Region: East Midlands
- Country: England
- Sovereign state: United Kingdom
- Post town: ASHBOURNE
- Postcode district: DE6
- Police: Derbyshire
- Fire: Derbyshire
- Ambulance: East Midlands
- UK Parliament: Derbyshire Dales

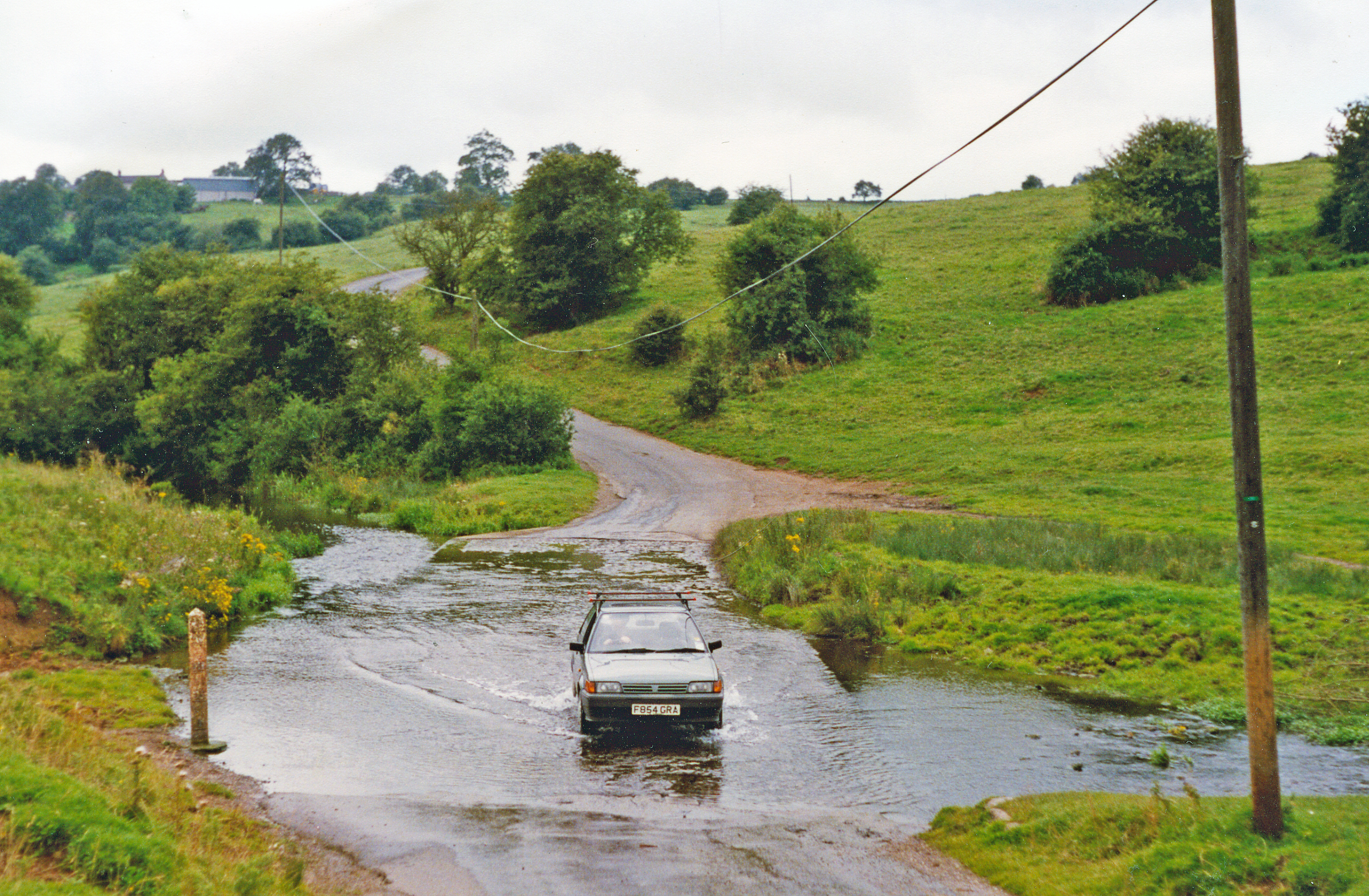
Ford across the Bradbourne Brook in typical Derbyshire countryside

Bradbourne is a village and civil parish in the Derbyshire Dales district of Derbyshire, England. The village is just outside the Peak District National Park, and is 5 miles north of Ashbourne.

Bradbourne is also one of the 51 Thankful Villages of England, having suffered no losses during World War I. It is also one of 14 Doubly Thankful Villages suffering no losses in World War II. It is the only village in Derbyshire to bear this title. The village is featured on Darren Hayman's album, Thankful Villages Volume 1.

According to the 2001 census the parish had a population of 116, increasing marginally to 117 at the 2011 census.

Bradbourne Hall is a 17th-century mansion house.

Bradbourne Mill to the south of the village is considered to be the oldest surviving watermill in Derbyshire; it was built in 1726 and continued in operation until the 1920s. The three-storey mill had a unique system of twin overshot waterwheels some 12 feet (3.7 meters) in diameter, which were powered by the Bradbourne Brook. The waterwheels and mill pond were restored, as part of the renovation and conversion of the building for residential use in 2008.

== History ==
Bradbourne was mentioned in the Domesday Book as belonging to Henry de Ferrers and being worth thirty shillings.

The village's parish church, All Saints' Church, Bradbourne, is the former Bradbourne Priory.

== See also ==
- Listed buildings in Bradbourne
