= Ballidon =

Village in Derbyshire, England

Coordinates: 53.088°N 1.697°W

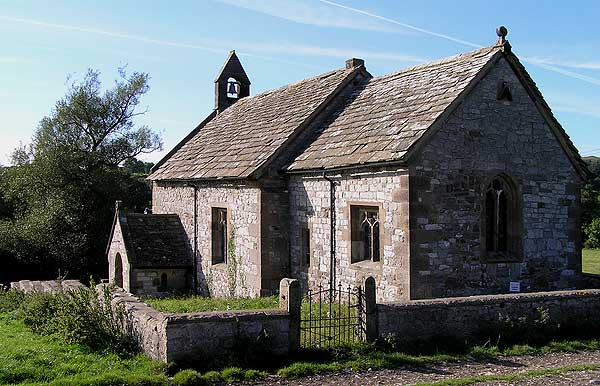
- Ballidon Church

- Ballidon parish highlighted within Derbyshire
- Population: 79 (2001 Census)
- OS grid reference: SK203545
- District: Derbyshire Dales
- Shire county: Derbyshire
- Region: East Midlands
- Country: England
- Sovereign state: United Kingdom
- Post town: ASHBOURNE
- Postcode district: DE6
- Police: Derbyshire
- Fire: Derbyshire
- Ambulance: East Midlands

Ballidon is a village and civil parish in the Derbyshire Dales district of Derbyshire, England, on the edge of the Peak District National Park. According to the 2001 census it had a population of 79. The population at the 2011 Census remained less than 100. Details are maintained in the civil Parish of Aldwark, Derbyshire.

Ballidon was listed in the Domesday Book of 1086 and was a much larger village than seen today. That area now devastated by the Tilcon Quarry was a deep valley and the site of an ambush of troops of the Jacobite rising of 1745; skulls and weaponry were recovered on the west bank of the stream.

Ballidon sits at the foot of Ballidon Dale, which is a Site of Special Scientific Interest (SSSI). At the head of the dale is Roystone Grange where there are remains of monuments from the Bronze Age, a Romano-British settlement and a medieval monastic grange.

The Limestone Way long-distance footpath passes just south of the hamlet of Ballidon.

== See also ==
- Listed buildings in Ballidon
