= Grade II* listed buildings in Derbyshire Dales =

There are over 20,000 Grade II* listed buildings in England. This page is a list of these buildings in the district of Derbyshire Dales in Derbyshire.

== List of buildings ==
Name	Location	Type	Completed (Note: The date given is the date used by Historic England as significant for the initial building or that of an important part in the structure's description.)	Date designated	Grid ref. (Note: Sometimes known as OSGB36, the grid reference is based on the British national grid reference system used by the Ordnance Survey.) Geo-coordinates	Entry number (Note: The "List Entry Number" is a unique number assigned to each listed building and scheduled monument by Historic England.)	Image
37–39 St John's Street	Ashbourne	Town house	18th century	14 February 1974	SK1813146787; 53°01′05″N 1°43′52″W	1335154	Upload Photo
Church of St John with street railings, gates, piers and front steps	Ashbourne	Church	1871	14 February 1974	SK1802346966; 53°01′11″N 1°43′58″W	1279720	Church of St John with street railings, gates, piers and front steps More images
Churchyard gate piers and gates to the parish church of St Oswald	Ashbourne	Gate	18th century	14 February 1974	SK1767546490; 53°00′56″N 1°44′17″W	1109551	Churchyard gate piers and gates to the parish church of St Oswald
Dove House	Ashbourne	House	Early 18th century	15 June 1951	SK1787246774; 53°01′05″N 1°44′06″W	1109519	Upload Photo
Owlfields Almshouses	Ashbourne	Almshouse	Shortly after 1640	15 June 1951	SK1776446530; 53°00′57″N 1°44′12″W	1207678	Owlfields Almshouses More images
Pegg's Almshouses	Ashbourne	Almshouse	1848	15 June 1951	SK1779146539; 53°00′57″N 1°44′11″W	1109548	Pegg's Almshouses More images
Smiths Wine Tavern	Ashbourne	Shop	Late 18th/early 19th century	15 June 1951	SK1809146729; 53°01′03″N 1°43′54″W	1109503	Smiths Wine Tavern
Summerhouse in grounds of Mansion House	Ashbourne	Summerhouse	Mid-18th century	15 June 1951	SK1776646498; 53°00′56″N 1°44′12″W	1109549	Upload Photo
The Green Man and Black's Head Hotel, attached inn sign bridging road	Ashbourne	Inn sign	Mid-18th century	15 June 1951	SK1802646674; 53°01′01″N 1°43′58″W	1293246	The Green Man and Black's Head Hotel, attached inn sign bridging road More images
The Grey House	Ashbourne	House	1760–70	15 June 1951	SK1773546547; 53°00′57″N 1°44′14″W	1109543	The Grey House More images
20 and 22, Market Place	Ashbourne	House	Late 17th/early 18th century	15 June 1951	SK1806046814; 53°01′06″N 1°43′56″W	1208191	20 and 22, Market Place
Ashford Hall	Ashford-in-the-Water	Country house	c. 1785	12 July 1967	SK1996469772; 53°13′29″N 1°42′09″W	1109281	Ashford Hall More images
Sheepwash Bridge	Ashford-in-the-Water	Bridge	18th century	12 July 1967	SK1943169612; 53°13′24″N 1°42′38″W	1335270	Sheepwash Bridge More images
Bagshaw Hall	Bakewell	Townhouse	1684	13 March 1951	SK2161868637; 53°12′52″N 1°40′40″W	1147985	Bagshaw Hall More images
Burton Closes	Bakewell	Country house	c.1845–48	13 March 1951	SK2205467664; 53°12′20″N 1°40′17″W	1148032	Burton Closes More images
Old House Museum including mounting block	Bakewell	House	c.16th and 17th century	20 April 1954	SK2147868541; 53°12′49″N 1°40′47″W	1247512	Old House Museum including mounting block More images
Church of St Anne	Baslow and Bubnell	Church	13th century	12 July 1967	SK2518072331; 53°14′51″N 1°37′27″W	1088200	Church of St Anne More images
Beeley Hilltop House	Beeley	Manor house	Early 17th century	12 July 1967	SK2694068412; 53°12′44″N 1°35′53″W	1088204	Beeley Hilltop House More images
Church of St Anne	Beeley	Church	12th century	12 July 1967	SK2648867646; 53°12′19″N 1°36′18″W	1063739	Church of St Anne More images
Old Hall, attached walls and doorway	Beeley	Manor house	Early 17th century	12 July 1967	SK2666267561; 53°12′16″N 1°36′08″W	1356550	Upload Photo
Green House and attached garden walls and gate piers	Birchover	House	1774	12 July 1967	SK2377462084; 53°09′19″N 1°38′45″W	1109893	Upload Photo
Market Cross	Bonsall	Cross	Late 14th century	22 June 1950	SK2791858292; 53°07′16″N 1°35′03″W	1248285	Market Cross More images
Parish Church of St James	Bonsall	Church	13th–14th century	22 June 1950	SK2798758133; 53°07′11″N 1°35′00″W	1263911	Parish Church of St James More images
Church of St John the Baptist	Boylestone	Church	Early 14th century	13 September 1967	SK1816335825; 52°55′10″N 1°43′53″W	1109778	Church of St John the Baptist More images
Bradbourne Hall	Bradbourne	House	Late 16th/early 17th century	11 October 1983	SK2084652751; 53°04′18″N 1°41′25″W	1109477	Bradbourne Hall More images
Church of All Saints	Bradley	Church	Late 14th century and earlier	13 September 1967	SK2234145970; 53°00′38″N 1°40′07″W	1109352	Church of All Saints More images
Church of St James	Brassington	Church	14th century	13 September 1967	SK2302654325; 53°05′08″N 1°39′28″W	1109483	Church of St James More images
The Gate Inn	Brassington	House	1616	13 September 1967	SK2298454209; 53°05′05″N 1°39′30″W	1109450	The Gate Inn More images
Callow Hall	Callow	Farmhouse	17th century	11 October 1983	SK2688751800; 53°03′46″N 1°36′01″W	1111886	Callow Hall More images
Calver Bridge	Calver	Road bridge	c.1800	12 July 1967	SK2463474422; 53°15′58″N 1°37′56″W	1088212	Calver Bridge More images
Church of St Margaret	Carsington	Church	1648	13 September 1967	SK2524253429; 53°04′39″N 1°37′29″W	1109458	Church of St Margaret More images
Queen Mary's Bower	Chatsworth	Viewing platform	16th century	12 July 1967	SK2575870306; 53°13′45″N 1°36′56″W	1334745	Queen Mary's Bower More images
The First Duke's Greenhouse	Chatsworth Gardens, Chatsworth	Glasshouse	1697 98	12 July 1967	SK2614370174; 53°13′41″N 1°36′35″W	1334741	The First Duke's Greenhouse More images
The Hunting Tower	Chatsworth	Hunting tower	c.1582	12 July 1967	SK2650070628; 53°13′55″N 1°36′16″W	1372877	The Hunting Tower More images
Church of St John the Baptist	Chelmorton	Church	13th century	12 July 1967	SK1155570262; 53°13′45″N 1°49′42″W	1109264	Church of St John the Baptist More images
Hanging Bridge and attached retaining walls to road (that part in Ashbourne Road)	Clifton and Compton	Road bridge	14th century	12 January 1966	SK1583145802; 53°00′33″N 1°45′56″W	1109712	Hanging Bridge and attached retaining walls to road (that part in Ashbourne Road) More images
Bridge House	Cromford	House	Early 17th century	22 June 1950	SK3005557271; 53°06′42″N 1°33′09″W	1247939	Bridge House More images
Cromford Bridge (over River Derwent)	Cromford	Road bridge	15th century	22 June 1950	SK3001457180; 53°06′39″N 1°33′11″W	1263846	Cromford Bridge (over River Derwent) More images
Greyhound Hotel	Cromford	Inn	Mid-18th century	22 June 1950	SK2950856922; 53°06′31″N 1°33′38″W	1248007	Greyhound Hotel More images
High Peak Pump House (Leawood Pump House)	High Peak Junction, Cromford	Pumphouse	Early 19th century	26 October 1972	SK3152855682; 53°05′51″N 1°31′50″W	1247889	High Peak Pump House (Leawood Pump House) More images
The Arkwright Houses	Cromford	House	1776 77	21 January 1964	SK2944656735; 53°06′25″N 1°33′42″W	1248131	The Arkwright Houses
The Arkwright Houses and unnumbered house to left of Number 1	Cromford	House	1776 77	21 January 1964	SK2946656749; 53°06′26″N 1°33′41″W	1263811	The Arkwright Houses and unnumbered house to left of Number 1
Willersley Castle	Cromford	Country house	1792	22 June 1950	SK2964857226; 53°06′41″N 1°33′31″W	1248280	Willersley Castle More images
Darley Bridge (over River Derwent)	Darley Bridge, Darley Dale	Road bridge	15th century	22 June 1950	SK2705262076; 53°09′18″N 1°35′49″W	1248041	Darley Bridge (over River Derwent) More images
Holt House	Darley Dale	House	Late 18th century	22 June 1950	SK2839662758; 53°09′40″N 1°34′36″W	1263879	Upload Photo
Parish Church of St Helen	Darley Dale	Church	Norman to Perpendicular	22 June 1950	SK2667662984; 53°09′48″N 1°36′09″W	1247836	Parish Church of St Helen More images
Home Farmhouse	West Broughton, Doveridge	Farmhouse	16th century	13 September 1967	SK1466532634; 52°53′27″N 1°47′01″W	1274524	Upload Photo
Lowerstreet Farmhouse	Doveridge	Farmhouse	Early 16th century	13 September 1967	SK1183233735; 52°54′03″N 1°49′32″W	1237735	Lowerstreet Farmhouse More images
Manor House	Doveridge	House	Early 18th century	13 September 1967	SK1221833872; 52°54′08″N 1°49′11″W	1238121	Manor House
Castle Lodge and attached railings	Edensor	Gate lodge	1842	12 July 1967	SK2510870004; 53°13′35″N 1°37′31″W	1088160	Castle Lodge and attached railings More images
Chatsworth Estate Office and Village Institute	Edensor	Hotel	c.1776–77	12 July 1967	SK2501370208; 53°13′42″N 1°37′36″W	1054089	Chatsworth Estate Office and Village Institute More images
House west of Park View occupied by Mr Hubbuck	Edensor	House	c.1830–40	12 July 1967	SK2514269943; 53°13′33″N 1°37′30″W	1088157	House west of Park View occupied by Mr Hubbuck More images
Norman Villa and attached garden walls	Edensor	House	c.1830–40	12 July 1967	SK2498869908; 53°13′32″N 1°37′38″W	1334748	Norman Villa and attached garden walls More images
One Arch Bridge	Edensor	Road bridge	1759–60	12 July 1967	SK2607168441; 53°12′45″N 1°36′40″W	1052356	One Arch Bridge More images
Tudor Lodge	Edensor	House	1837–39	12 July 1967	SK2501970102; 53°13′39″N 1°37′36″W	1334736	Tudor Lodge More images
Church of St James	Edlaston	Church	Early 14th century	13 September 1967	SK1811842674; 52°58′52″N 1°43′54″W	1158423	Church of St James More images
Church of St Lawrence	Eyam	Church	1775	12 July 1967	SK2177476417; 53°17′03″N 1°40′30″W	1110019	Church of St Lawrence More images
Eyam Hall	Eyam	Country house	Early 17th century	29 September 1951	SK2164076493; 53°17′06″N 1°40′37″W	1334913	Eyam Hall More images
Cherry Orchard Farmhouse and attached outbuildings	Fenny Bentley	Farmhouse	Late 17th century	5 February 1952	SK1760050181; 53°02′55″N 1°44′20″W	1109314	Cherry Orchard Farmhouse and attached outbuildings More images
Church of St Edmund	Fenny Bentley	Church	c.1300	13 September 1967	SK1745750189; 53°02′55″N 1°44′28″W	1335262	Church of St Edmund More images
Flagg Hall	Flagg	Farmhouse	17th century	27 July 1984	SK1376968484; 53°12′48″N 1°47′43″W	1109266	Upload Photo
Old Farmhouse, Town Head Farm	Flagg	Farmhouse	1639	27 July 1984	SK1288969017; 53°13′05″N 1°48′30″W	1109265	Old Farmhouse, Town Head Farm More images
The Hall	Great Longstone	Country house	17th century	29 September 1951	SK1985571954; 53°14′39″N 1°42′14″W	1109904	Upload Photo
Stoke Hall	Grindleford	Country house	1757	8 August 1985	SK2402776138; 53°16′54″N 1°38′28″W	1158686	Stoke Hall More images
Biggin Hall	Biggin	House	c.1642	10 August 1951	SK1517259570; 53°07′59″N 1°46′29″W	1087837	Upload Photo
Church of St Giles	Hartington	Church	Late 13th century	10 August 1951	SK1296160478; 53°08′29″N 1°48′28″W	1087851	Church of St Giles More images
Hassop Hall	Hassop	Country house	17th century	29 September 1951	SK2219572216; 53°14′47″N 1°40′08″W	1088171	Hassop Hall More images
Hathersage Hall	Hathersage	Country house	1496	29 September 1951	SK2334981670; 53°19′53″N 1°39′03″W	1109807	Hathersage Hall
Roman Catholic Church of St Michael	Hathersage	Church	Early 18th century	12 July 1967	SK2295281602; 53°19′51″N 1°39′25″W	1109804	Roman Catholic Church of St Michael More images
Hazlebadge Hall	Hazlebadge	House	1549	29 September 1951	SK1716879998; 53°19′00″N 1°44′38″W	1356169	Hazlebadge Hall More images
Gateway to Highlow Hall	Highlow	Gate	Early 17th century	12 July 1967	SK2189180111; 53°19′03″N 1°40′22″W	1334994	Gateway to Highlow Hall More images
Highlow Hall	Highlow	Manor house	Late 16th century	29 September 1951	SK2191280096; 53°19′02″N 1°40′21″W	1311217	Highlow Hall More images
Church of St Bartholomew	Hognaston	Church	12th century	13 September 1967	SK2352250585; 53°03′07″N 1°39′02″W	1138313	Church of St Bartholomew More images
Bentley Hall	Hungry Bentley	House	Early 17th century	13 June 1967	SK1776038102; 52°56′24″N 1°44′14″W	1335022	Upload Photo
The Barley Mow Inn	Kirk Ireton	Inn	c.1600	20 October 1983	SK2662950136; 53°02′52″N 1°36′15″W	1335227	The Barley Mow Inn More images
Horsley Farmhouse	Kniveton	Farmhouse	Mid-18th century	13 September 1967	SK1990551572; 53°03′40″N 1°42′16″W	1146373	Upload Photo
The Manor House	Little Hucklow	House	1661	12 July 1967	SK1642978565; 53°18′14″N 1°45′18″W	1334904	The Manor House
Cressbrook Mill	Litton	Cotton mill	1779	12 July 1967	SK1729972709; 53°15′04″N 1°44′32″W	1158897	Cressbrook Mill More images
Barn at Longford Hall Farm	Longford	Barn	1760	13 June 1967	SK2149838432; 52°56′34″N 1°40′54″W	1109788	Upload Photo
Gates and gatepiers to east of Longford Hall	Longford	Gates	Early 18th century	19 July 1985	SK2159438250; 52°56′28″N 1°40′48″W	1204005	Gates and gatepiers to east of Longford Hall
Longford Hall and attached garden wall	Longford	Country house	Late 16th century	13 June 1967	SK2150538249; 52°56′28″N 1°40′53″W	1109787	Longford Hall and attached garden wall More images
Stable block and coach house at Longford Hall Farm	Longford	Stable	Early 19th century	13 June 1967	SK2147438372; 52°56′32″N 1°40′55″W	1281396	Stable block and coach house at Longford Hall Farm
Church of St Mary	Mapleton	Church	Mid-18th century	13 September 1967	SK1659348039; 53°01′46″N 1°45′15″W	1335265	Church of St Mary More images
Manor House	Mapleton	House	Early 18th century	13 September 1967	SK1633047428; 53°01′26″N 1°45′29″W	1109317	Manor House More images
Okeover Almshouses	Mapleton	Almshouses	1727–30	13 September 1967	SK1649048097; 53°01′48″N 1°45′20″W	1203564	Okeover Almshouses More images
Church of St Giles	Marston Montgomery	Church	12th century	13 September 1967	SK1349437888; 52°56′18″N 1°48′02″W	1204368	Church of St Giles More images
The Manor House	Marston Montgomery	House	Late 17th century	5 February 1952	SK1339537840; 52°56′16″N 1°48′08″W	1109755	The Manor House More images
Dale Cottage	Matlock Bath	House	1820	22 June 1950	SK2955659464; 53°07′53″N 1°33′35″W	1247891	Dale Cottage More images
Masson Mills	Cromford	Cotton mill	c.1783	13 July 1955	SK2942657348; 53°06′45″N 1°33′43″W	1247935	Masson Mills More images
Chapel of St John the Baptist, supporting retaining wall and attached boundary walls	Matlock Bath	Chapel	1897	26 October 1972	SK2942659416; 53°07′52″N 1°33′42″W	1248139	Chapel of St John the Baptist, supporting retaining wall and attached boundary walls More images
Church of St Giles	Matlock	Church	15th century	22 June 1950	SK3008359769; 53°08′03″N 1°33′07″W	1247838	Church of St Giles More images
Riber Manor	Riber	House	1633	22 June 1950	SK3095959094; 53°07′41″N 1°32′20″W	1278030	Riber Manor More images
Matlock Bridge (over River Derwent)	Matlock	Bridge	15th century	22 June 1950	SK2978460174; 53°08′16″N 1°33′22″W	1247890	Matlock Bridge (over River Derwent) More images
Riber Hall	Riber	House	Early 17th century	22 June 1950	SK3087258977; 53°07′37″N 1°32′24″W	1278020	Riber Hall More images
St Andrew's House	The Cliff, Matlock	House	Mid-18th century	5 September 1972	SK3082759916; 53°08′08″N 1°32′26″W	1247886	St Andrew's House
Wheatsheaf Farmhouse	Matlock	Farmhouse	1681	22 June 1950	SK3002359709; 53°08′01″N 1°33′10″W	1247840	Wheatsheaf Farmhouse More images
Church of St Leonard	Monyash	Church	Early 13th century	12 July 1967	SK1514466473; 53°11′42″N 1°46′29″W	1087822	Church of St Leonard More images
Garden terraces and steps to south east of Haddon Hall	Haddon Hall	Steps	Mid-18th century	12 July 1967	SK2354966366; 53°11′38″N 1°38′56″W	1158083	Garden terraces and steps to south east of Haddon Hall
Offerton Hall	Offerton	Manor house	16th century	29 September 1951	SK2139681051; 53°19′33″N 1°40′49″W	1109771	Offerton Hall More images
Church of St Martin	Osmaston	Church	1845	13 September 1967	SK1994744011; 52°59′35″N 1°42′15″W	1335071	Church of St Martin More images
North Lees Hall	Hathersage	House	Late 16th century	29 September 1951	SK2353983451; 53°20′51″N 1°38′52″W	1109774	North Lees Hall More images
Church of St Peter	Parwich	Church	12th century	14 June 1984	SK1883454351; 53°05′10″N 1°43′13″W	1109332	Church of St Peter More images
Parwich Hall	Parwich	House	Before c.1747	5 February 1952	SK1863854606; 53°05′18″N 1°43′23″W	1281585	Parwich Hall More images
Caudwell's Mill	Rowsley	Feed mill	1874	2 December 1977	SK2557365743; 53°11′17″N 1°37′07″W	1088147	Caudwell's Mill More images
Rowsley Bridge (over River Derwent)	Little Rowsley, Rowsley	Bridge	15th century	22 June 1950	SK2567365898; 53°11′22″N 1°37′02″W	1263843	Rowsley Bridge (over River Derwent) More images
The Peacock Hotel	Rowsley	Hotel	1652	29 September 1951	SK2560065867; 53°11′21″N 1°37′06″W	1045804	The Peacock Hotel More images
Church of St Michael	Shirley	Church	14th century	13 September 1967	SK2188741656; 52°58′19″N 1°40′32″W	1109692	Church of St Michael More images
Saw Mill (Osmaston Mill)	Shirley	Sawmill	c.1845	12 July 1985	SK2074242826; 52°58′57″N 1°41′33″W	1109698	Saw Mill (Osmaston Mill) More images
Church of St Peter	Snelston	Church	15th century	13 September 1967	SK1554043332; 52°59′14″N 1°46′12″W	1109768	Church of St Peter More images
Montgomery House	Somersal Herbert	House	Early 17th century	13 September 1967	SK1392135177; 52°54′50″N 1°47′40″W	1238456	Montgomery House
Holly House	Stanton in Peak	House	Late 17th century	12 July 1967	SK2404964331; 53°10′32″N 1°38′30″W	1334986	Holly House
Stanton Hall	Stanton in Peak	House	Early 18th century	12 July 1967	SK2409464164; 53°10′27″N 1°38′28″W	1158182	Stanton Hall More images
The Manor House, Stanton Woodhouse	Stanton in Peak	Country house	16th century	12 July 1967	SK2561864285; 53°10′30″N 1°37′05″W	1311580	Upload Photo
Church of St Martin	Stoney Middleton	Church	15th century	12 July 1967	SK2316875479; 53°16′33″N 1°39′15″W	1109973	Church of St Martin More images
Church of All Saints	Sudbury	Church	12th century	13 September 1967	SK1576832174; 52°53′12″N 1°46′02″W	1273942	Church of All Saints More images
Folly or deercote in Park	Sudbury	Hunting lodge	Mid-18th century	13 September 1967	SK1622532729; 52°53′30″N 1°45′37″W	1238617	Folly or deercote in Park More images
South Viaduct	Millers Dale, Taddington	Railway viaduct	1862–63	4 October 1985	SK1395673215; 53°15′21″N 1°47′32″W	1087894	South Viaduct More images
Knoll House	Tansley	House	1788	5 September 1969	SK3217260139; 53°08′15″N 1°31′14″W	1247942	Upload Photo
Church of St Mary	Tissington	Church	12th century	13 September 1967	SK1764852276; 53°04′03″N 1°44′17″W	1109271	Church of St Mary More images
Tissington Hall	Tissington	House	Early 17th century	5 February 1952	SK1746352347; 53°04′05″N 1°44′27″W	1335283	Tissington Hall More images
Wheston Cross	Wheston	Cross	15th century	12 July 1967	SK1319476438; 53°17′05″N 1°48′13″W	1215269	Wheston Cross More images
The Market Hall	Winster	Market hall	16th century	29 September 1951	SK2414860550; 53°08′30″N 1°38′26″W	1245115	The Market Hall More images
Winster Hall	Winster	Country house	Early 18th century	29 September 1951	SK2412060586; 53°08′31″N 1°38′27″W	1109367	Winster Hall More images
Babington House	Wirksworth	House	c.1630	24 October 1950	SK2860254132; 53°05′01″N 1°34′28″W	1335118	Upload Photo
Grammar School	Wirksworth	School	1828	24 October 1950	SK2878553969; 53°04′56″N 1°34′18″W	1109616	Grammar School More images
Haarlem Mill	Wirksworth	Mill	18th century	23 January 1973	SK2837252573; 53°04′11″N 1°34′41″W	1335116	Haarlem Mill More images
Old Manor House	Wirksworth	House	Early 17th century	23 January 1973	SK2885454021; 53°04′57″N 1°34′14″W	1335096	Upload Photo
Red Lion Hotel	Wirksworth	Hotel	Mid-18th century	24 October 1950	SK2867354046; 53°04′58″N 1°34′24″W	1112540	Red Lion Hotel More images
The Gate House	Wirksworth	House	Early 17th century	24 October 1950	SK2854653866; 53°04′53″N 1°34′31″W	1109609	Upload Photo
Wigwell Grange	Wirksworth	House	Regency	24 October 1950	SK3063454385; 53°05′09″N 1°32′39″W	1109565	Wigwell Grange More images
1 Coldwell Street	Wirksworth	House	Late 18th century	24 October 1950	SK2869054041; 53°04′58″N 1°34′23″W	1335095	1 Coldwell Street
15 Market Place	Wirksworth	House	Mid-18th century	24 October 1950	SK2864754041; 53°04′58″N 1°34′26″W	1109590	15 Market Place More images
Stydd Hall and attached garden wall	Yeaveley	Farmhouse	c.1840	5 February 1952	SK1720040019; 52°57′26″N 1°44′43″W	1204898	Stydd Hall and attached garden wall
Old Hall Farmhouse	Youlgreave	Farmhouse	1630	12 July 1967	SK2096164303; 53°10′32″N 1°41′16″W	1335002	Old Hall Farmhouse More images
Matlock Bath War Memorial	Matlock Bath	War memorial	1921	12 February 2018	SK2960758373; 53°07′18″N 1°33′33″W	1451237	Matlock Bath War Memorial More images

== See also ==
- Grade I listed buildings in Derbyshire
- Grade II* listed buildings in Derbyshire
  - Grade II* listed buildings in Amber Valley
  - Grade II* listed buildings in Bolsover (district)
  - Grade II* listed buildings in Chesterfield
  - Grade II* listed buildings in Derby
  - Grade II* listed buildings in Erewash
  - Grade II* listed buildings in High Peak
  - Grade II* listed buildings in North East Derbyshire
  - Grade II* listed buildings in South Derbyshire
