= Listed buildings in Mapleton, Derbyshire =

Mapleton is a civil parish in the Derbyshire Dales district of Derbyshire, England. The parish contains eleven listed buildings that are recorded in the National Heritage List for England. Of these, three are listed at Grade II*, the middle of the three grades, and the others are at Grade II, the lowest grade. The parish contains the village of Mapleton and the surrounding countryside. The listed buildings consist of houses and associated structures, a farmhouse, a church, almshouses, a public house, and a bridge.

== Key ==
Grade	Criteria
II*	Particularly important buildings of more than special interest
II	Buildings of national importance and special interest

== Buildings ==
Name and location	Photograph	Date	Notes	Grade
St Mary's Church; 53.02940°N 1.75412°W		Medieval (probable)	The oldest part of the church is the lower stage of the tower, with the rest dating from about 1740–60. The church is built in limestone with sandstone dressings, quoins, and a cornice, and consists of a nave and chancel in one unit, and a west tower. The tower has two stages, a west porch with a flat hood and two Doric columns, and a doorway with a moulded semicircular arch, imposts, and a keystone. The lower stage of the tower contains arrow slits, and the narrow upper stage has elongated circular bell openings and a cornice. The tower is surmounted by an octagonal dome and a lantern. The windows on the sides and at the east end of the church have round-arched heads, imposts and keystones.	II*
Manor House; 53.02396°N 1.75801°W		Early 18th century	The house is in brick with stone dressings, a moulded eaves cornice, and a hipped tile roof. The west front has three bays, the middle three bays projecting under a pediment containing a Diocletian window. The central doorway has a rusticated surround, projecting imposts, a fanlight, and a keystone, and the windows are sashes. The framing of the doorway is carried up as a surround to the window above and has a cornice on brackets, a balustrade and an architrave. The east front has three bays, a central doorway with similar features and a pediment, and it is linked to the window above that has an architrave and a triple keystone. In the roof are dormers.	II*
Okeover Almshouses; 53.02995°N 1.75560°W		1727–30	The almshouses are in brick with sandstone dressings, rusticated quoins, an eaves band and cornice, and a hipped tile roof. There are two storeys and north front of five bays, the middle bay projecting under a pediment, with rusticated angle pilasters. In the centre is a doorway converted into a window with a Gibbs surround. The other windows are sashes with moulded architraves. The south front has six bays, the middle two projecting.	II*
Mill House; 53.02715°N 1.75559°W		Early to mid 18th century	A farmhouse, later a private house, it is in whitewashed red brick, with a tile roof, and three storeys and an attic. The front is symmetrical with three bays, and to the right is a lower extension. The central doorway has a canopy, and the windows are casements with cambered heads.	II
Okeover Bridge; 53.03017°N 1.75744°W		Late 18th century	The bridge carries Yerley Hill over the River Dove. It is in sandstone, and consists of a single segmental arch. The bridge has voussoirs, a chamfered string course, chamfered coping stones, and square angle piers. The side walls are steeply canted.	II
Hinchleywood; 53.03308°N 1.75349°W		c. 1790	A rendered house with sandstone dressings and a hipped slate roof. There are two storeys, a front of four bays, and a recessed four-bay wing added to the east in 1960. In the centre of the original range is a porch with four Doric columns and a parapet. The windows are sashes, and there is a later dormer. In the angle with the wing is a semicircular conservatory, and on the west front is a two-storey canted bay window.	II
Gate piers, Hinchleywood; 53.03224°N 1.75375°W		Early 19th century	The gate piers flanking the entrance to the drive are in sandstone. They have a square plan, and each pier has a plain frieze, a cornice and a pineapple finial.	II
Okeover Arms Public House; 53.02911°N 1.75462°W		Early 19th century	The public house is in brick, mostly rendered, with a tile roof. There are three storeys and a T-shaped plan, with a front range of three bays, and a two-storey extension to the south. Most of the windows are sashes, and in the extension is a casement window.	II
Haywood Farmhouse; 53.02629°N 1.74130°W		Mid-19th century	The farmhouse is in rendered brick with a tile roof, and two storeys. The south front has three symmetrical bays and a broad bay. On the front is a porch with a pediment on columns, and the windows are sashes.	II
Callow Hall; 53.02060°N 1.74856°W		1852	A house in Elizabethan style, later a hotel, it is in limestone with gritstone dressings, on a chamfered plinth, with quoins, a floor band, a moulded eaves cornice and a slate roof with coped gables and kneelers. There are two storeys and an L-shaped plan, with two ranges and a lower service wing to the northeast. On the east front are three gables, the right one larger, and a central porch, open on three sides with moulded round arches, rusticated angles, a cornice, an openwork parapet, and ball finials. The windows are mullioned and transomed. The south front is symmetrical with three gables, the middle bay projecting and containing a bay window breaking into an oriel window, with a parapet and a quatrefoil frieze. In the angle of the ranges is a bell tower with a concave pyramidal roof.	II
Stables, Callow Hall; 53.02062°N 1.74701°W		1852	The stables are in Elizabethan style, and are in limestone with gritstone dressings. There is a tile roof with coped gables and kneelers, and a single storey with attics. The building contains a central round-arched carriageway with a dormer above, mullioned windows, and another dormer to the right.	II
