= Hannah Allen =

British nonconformist writer

- Born: Hannah Archer c. 1638; Snelston, Derbyshire, England
- Occupation: writer
- Spouse: Hannibal Allen (m. 1655; died 1663) Charles Hatt (m. 1668, died)
- Writing career
- Genre: Nonconformism
- Notable works: A narrative of God's gracious dealings with that choice Christian Mrs. Hannah Allen (afterwards married to Mr. Hatt,) reciting the great advantages the devil made of her deep melancholy, and the triumphant victories, rich and sovereign graces, God gave her over all his stratagems and devices., 1683

Hannah Allen (née, Archer; after first marriage, Allen, after second marriage, Hatt; c.1638 – ?) was a 17th-century British nonconformist writer from Derbyshire. She suffered from religious melancholy, a condition characterized by depression and self-doubt. Her experiences were detailed in her autobiographical work, A narrative of God's gracious dealings with that choice Christian Mrs. Hannah Allen (afterwards married to Mr. Hatt,) reciting the great advantages the devil made of her deep melancholy, and the triumphant victories, rich and sovereign graces, God gave her over all his stratagems and devices., which was published in 1683. Allen's narrative recounts her struggles with religious despair and her eventual recovery.

== Biography ==
Hannah Archer, the daughter of John Archer of Snelston, Derbyshire, was born about 1638. At the age of two, her father died. Her maternal grandfather was William Hart of Uttoxeter Woodland, Staffordshire. While living with a paternal aunt, Allen attended school in London when she was 12, after which she returned to her widowed mother, and it was then that her depression was first recorded.

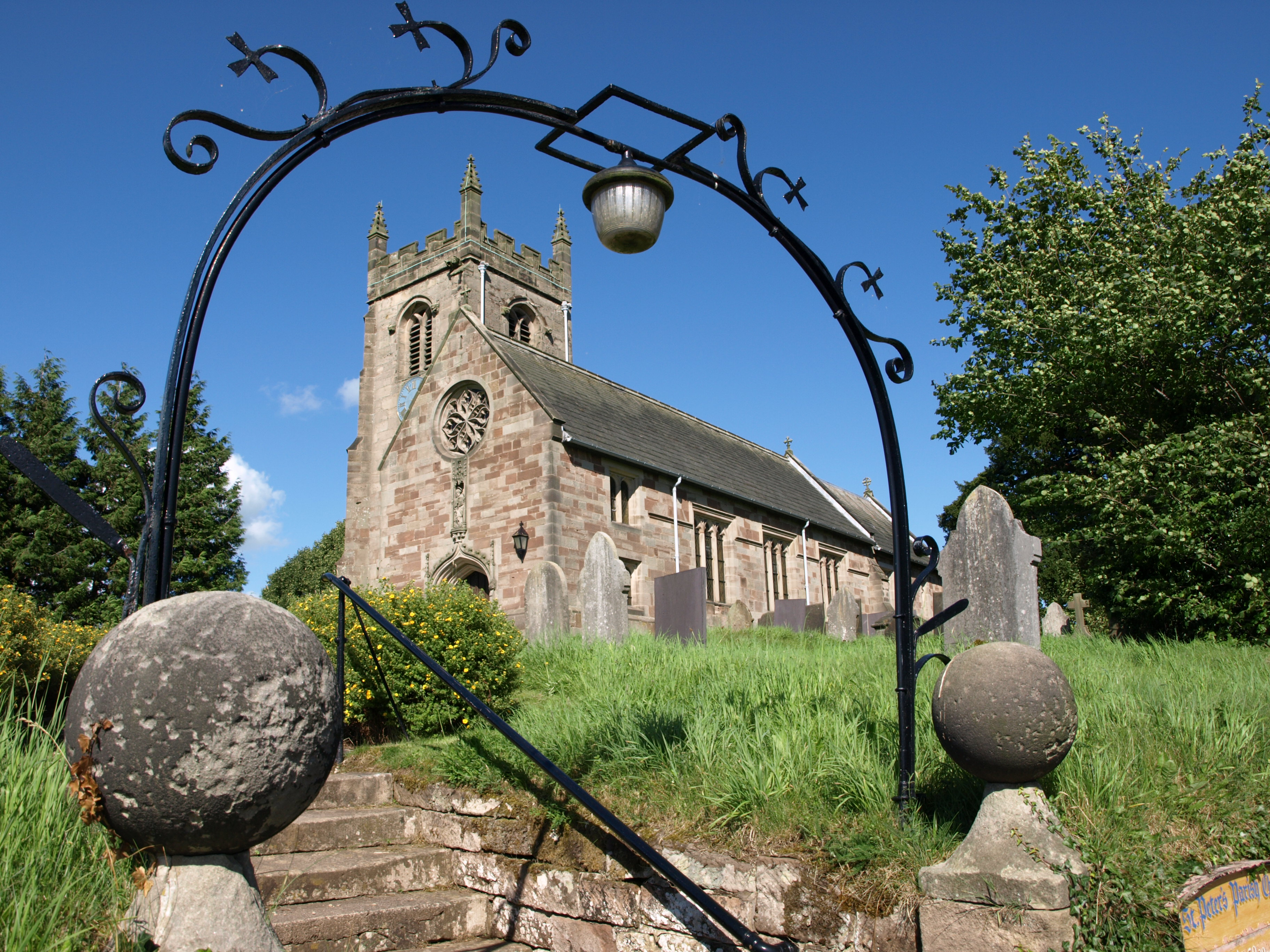
St Peter's Church in Snelston - Allen had links to the village throughout her life.

While suffering from depression, she married, c. 1655, the merchant, Hannibal Allen (died 1663), and they had a son. After the husband's death, she expressed a form of insanity in religious form, characterized in her case by depression, self-doubt, and low appetite. The minister John Shorthose aided in her mental improvement which occurred between April 1666 and the spring of 1668, at which time she married Charles Hatt, a widower of Warwickshire, having joined a Presbyterian congregation in London beforehand.

Allen's rhapsodical work, A narrative of God's gracious dealings with that choice Christian Mrs. Hannah Allen (afterwards married to Mr. Hatt,) reciting the great advantages the devil made of her deep melancholy, and the triumphant victories, rich and sovereign graces, God gave her over all his stratagems and devices., was published by John Wallis, in London, in 1683.

== Selected works ==
- 1683, A narrative of God's gracious dealings with that choice Christian Mrs. Hannah Allen (afterwards married to Mr. Hatt,) reciting the great advantages the devil made of her deep melancholy, and the triumphant victories, rich and sovereign graces, God gave her over all his stratagems and devices. (text) via Internet Archive
