= Listed buildings in Sudbury, Derbyshire =

Sudbury is a civil parish in the Derbyshire Dales district of Derbyshire, England. The parish contains 37 listed buildings that are recorded on the National Heritage List for England. Of these, one is listed at Grade I, the highest of the three grades, two are at Grade II*, the middle grade, and the others are at Grade II, the lowest grade. The parish contains the village of Sudbury and the surrounding countryside. The most important building in the parish is Sudbury Hall, which is listed, together with associated structures in the garden and grounds. Most of the other listed buildings are houses, cottages and associated structures, farmhouses and farm buildings. The rest of the listed buildings include a church, a public house, shops, a set of stocks, a road bridge, a school, buildings for the Maynell Hunt, and a former gas works.

== Key ==
Grade	Criteria
I	Buildings of exceptional interest, sometimes considered to be internationally important
II*	Particularly important buildings of more than special interest
II	Buildings of national importance and special interest

== Buildings ==
Name and location	Photograph	Date	Notes	Grade
All Saints' Church; 52.88683°N 1.76719°W		12th century	The church has been altered and extended through the centuries, and was considerably rebuilt in 1874–75 by George Devey. It is built in sandstone with lead roofs, and consists of a nave with a clerestory, north and south aisles, a south porch, a chancel with a north chapel, a vestry and an organ chamber, and a west tower. The tower has diagonal buttresses, a two-light west window and a hood mould continuous with a moulded string course. The bell openings have two lights, and at the top is a balustraded parapet with eight pinnacles. The south doorway is Norman with roll moulding, and in the north wall is a 14th-century blocked doorway with an ogee head, over which is an angel carved in relief. The nave and the north aisle have embattled parapets, and the east windows has six lights.	II*
Gateway and walls, Sudbury Hall; 52.88669°N 1.76641°W	—	1626	The gateway between the hall and the church is in stone, and has a moulded architrave, a pulvinated frieze and a cross finial. On the south face are two inscribed panels. The gateway is flanked by coped brick walls.	II
Sudbury Hall and stable block 52.88629°N 1.76565°W		1659–60	A country house to which the east wing was added in 1876–83 by George Devey. It is in red brick with vitrified brick diapering, quoins, a moulded floor band, a dentilled eaves cornice, and a hipped tile roof. The original block has two storeys and attics, and an E-shaped plan, with fronts of nine bays. In the south front, the middle and outer bays project, and at the top is a balustraded parapet, a hipped tile roof, and a central domed cupola with a finial. The middle bay has a round-arched doorway, and at the top is a segmental pediment containing a carving. In the middle of the north front is a two-storey porch with paired columns and broken pediments. The east wing is lower and recessed, with eight bays, and a balustraded staircase in the angle. The stable block extends at right angles to the rear, it has two storeys, and contains a round-headed carriage arch, above which is a clock face and a cupola bell turret.	I
Vernon Arms Hotel and stables 52.88575°N 1.76257°W		1671	The public house and attached stables are in red brick with sandstone dressings, quoins, and a tile roof with chamfered gable copings and ball finials. There are two storeys and stables at the rear enclosing a courtyard. The front is symmetrical, with nine bays, the middle and outer bays projecting and gabled. In the centre is a segmental carriage arch with rusticated piers, voussoirs, moulded imposts, a keystone, and a wrought iron sign on a bracket. Above this is a three-light mullioned window with a moulded hood mould, over which is panel with a coat of arms. The outer bays contain mullioned windows, and in the roof are dormers with hipped roofs. The stables contain a central carriage arch at the rear.	II
Leathersley Farm House; 52.87740°N 1.76565°W	—	Late 17th century	The farmhouse, which was extended in the 18th century, is in red brick with sandstone dressings and a tile roof. The early part has stone coped gables and moulded kneelers, and the extension has brick coped gables and plain kneelers. There are two storeys and attics, floor bands, and a symmetrical front of four bays. In the centre is a doorway with massive chamfered jambs and lintel. The windows are mullioned with many mullions removed, and there is a roof dormer with a hipped roof. The extension is recessed on the right, and contains a single-light window, and a three-light casement window under a flat arch.	II
Gardeners Cottages; 52.88829°N 1.76628°W	—	1678	The older two cottages were built as almshouses, and the third cottage was added to the west in about 1845, forming a T-shaped plan. They are in red brick with tile roofs, coped gables and plain kneelers. The older pair have a single storey and attics, a floor band, three doorways, two with bracketed hoods, single-light and casement windows, and two gabled dormers on the south front. The later cottage is taller, with two storeys, a front of three gabled bays, the middle bay narrower and projecting. In the centre is a doorway with a chamfered surround, the windows are casements, and all the openings have hood moulds.	II
8 Main Road; 52.88544°N 1.76191°W	—	Early 18th century	A red brick house on a tall chamfered plinth, with a floor band and a tile roof. There are two storeys and two bays. The doorway and the windows, which are casements, have segmental heads.	II
16 and 17 Main Road; 52.88551°N 1.76249°W		Early 18th century	A pair of cottages in red brick with floor bands, and a tile roof with a coped gable and plain kneelers to the north. There is a single storey and attics, and three bays. On the front are two doorways, one with a moulded surround and a segmental pediment. The windows are casements, and in the attics are three gabled dormers.	II
Estate Office, walls and outbuildings 52.88591°N 1.76336°W	—	Early 18th century	A pair of houses, later used for other purposes, in red brick, with floor bands, the lower one stepped over the ground floor openings, and a tile roof with stone gable copings and moulded kneelers. There are two storeys and four bays, and a rear lean-to. On the front are two doorways, the left with a Tudor arched lintel, and the right with a segmental head. Over the right doorway is a sunk panel with an arched head containing a coat of arms, and the windows on the front are casements. At the rear are two ranges of single-storey outbuildings forming a courtyard, closed at the south by a brick wall. The wall contains two sets of gate piers and a small central gabled coach house.	II
Park House and Park Cottage; 52.88891°N 1.76651°W		Early 18th century	A house and cottage, with extensions by George Devey in about 1875, in red brick with vitrified headers and blue brick diapering, a floor band, and tile roofs. Park Cottage to the right has two storeys and two bays, a central doorway and casement windows, the openings in the ground floor with segmental heads. Park House is higher, with two storeys and attics, coped gables and moulded kneelers, and two bays. The doorway to the right has a segmental head, in the left bay is a canted bay window, the other windows are casements with segmental heads, and in the attic are two dormers with hipped roofs. On the south and east fronts are two-storey timber framed porches with an open balustrade.	II
The Laurels; 52.88555°N 1.76172°W		Early 18th century	A house and a shop that were extended in 1900, they are in red brick with stone dressings, a tile roof and two storeys. The shop on the left has a single bay, a double flight of steps, and a shop front consisting of a recessed doorway flanked by canted bay windows. Above this are two two-light windows in a half-dormer in a shaped gable containing a dated plaque. The house to the right has three bays, each with a shaped gable containing decorative brickwork, a chamfered plinth, and corbelled floor and eaves bands. In the centre is a double flight of steps leading to a doorway with a moulded surround and a segmental pediment, flanked by three-light casement windows with wedge lintels and keystones. Above are two-light casement windows in half dormers.	II
7 Main Road; 52.88542°N 1.76177°W	—	Early to mid 18th century	The house is in red brick with vitrified headers on a chamfered plinth, with a floor band, and a tile roof with brick coped gables and plain kneelers. There are two storeys and three bays. The doorway and the windows, which are casements, have segmental heads.	II
11 School Lane; 52.88518°N 1.76236°W	—	Mid 18th century	A house in red brick with vitrified headers and some diapering, floor bands, and a tile roof with brick coped gables and plain kneelers. There are two storeys and two bays. The central doorway and the windows, which are three-light casements, have segmental heads.	II
Brook House; 52.88561°N 1.76269°W	—	Mid 18th century	A red brick house on a plinth to the south, with quoins to the west, and a tile roof with stone coped gables and moulded kneelers. There are two storeys, a basement and attics, and three bays. On the north front are casement windows with flat heads, and three dormers. On the south front, seven steps lead up to a doorway, there is a basement doorway to the left, and the windows are casements with flat heads.	II
Deercote or folly 52.89181°N 1.76036°W		Mid 18th century	The deer shelter in Sudbury Park was altered in the early 19th century, and is in red brick with sandstone dressings, and is embattled. It is in the form of a castle with a gatehouse, four angle turrets, and a curtain wall on three sides, enclosing a large square space. The gatehouse is in the centre of the south wall, and has a gabled centre over a round headed blind archway, flanked by polygonal turrets. The turrets have chamfered plinths and two tiers of arrow slit windows. The screen walls contain Gothic arches with moulded hood moulds.	II*
School House; 52.88441°N 1.76238°W	—	18th century	The house is in red brick with vitrified headers, a floor band, and a tile roof. There is a single storey and attic, and two bays. In the centre is a gabled porch flanked by casement windows, that on the left with a wedge lintel, and on the right with a segmental head. In the attic are two gabled dormers.	II
Stocks; 52.88537°N 1.76103°W	—	18th century (probable)	The stocks, adjacent to No. 4 Main Street, were moved to their present position in 1938. They are in timber and consist of two square end posts, and two planks between with four circular holes for the legs.	II
The Cottage; 52.88535°N 1.76142°W	—	Mid 18th century	The house is in red brick with vitrified headers, on a chamfered plinth, with a dentilled eaves cornice, and a tile roof with stone coped gables and plain kneelers. There are two storeys and three bays. The central doorway has a fanlight, the windows are casements, and all have flat heads.	II
Footbridge, Sudbury Park; 52.88409°N 1.76571°W		18th century	The footbridge at the end of the lake in Sudbury Park is in red brick and sandstone. It consists of five arches, which are depressed segmental to the west and semicircular to the east. The west side is faced in stone and has voussoirs, a plain band, triangular cutwaters shaped like buttresses, and a coped parapet wall ending in piers surmounted by eagles. The east side is in brick with stone copings, and is plain.	II
2, 3, 4 and 5 Main Road; 52.88530°N 1.76107°W		Late 18th century	A terrace of four cottages in red brick with a dentilled eaves cornice and a tile roof. There are two storeys and ten bays. In the centre is a round-arched passage doorway, and the other doorways have segmental heads. Most of the windows are casements with segmental heads, and there are two lunettes.	II
Somersal Lane Farmhouse; 52.90038°N 1.78429°W		Late 18th century	The farmhouse is in red brick with a dentilled eaves cornice and a tile roof. There are two storeys and a symmetrical front of three bays. In the centre is a gabled porch, and the windows are casements with segmental heads.	II
Kitchen garden walls, Sudbury Hall; 52.88782°N 1.76629°W	—	Late 18th century	The walls of the former kitchen garden are in red brick with stone dressings and copings. They surround an irregular four-sided enclosure, and there are two cross walls. The walls are ramped in places, and have pilaster buttresses.	II
Windybank Farmhouse; 52.91190°N 1.77936°W	—	Late 18th century	A rear wing was added to the farmhouse in about 1864. The building is in red brick with a dentilled eaves cornice and a tile roof. There are two storeys and attics, and an L-shaped plan with a symmetrical front range of three bays, and a rear wing. In the centre is a timber gabled porch with a tile roof, and the windows are casements with segmental heads.	II
Lodges, gates and walls north of Sudbury Hall; 52.88608°N 1.76348°W		1787	The two lodges are in red brick with stone dressings, and each has angle quoins, a moulded eaves cornice, and a pyramidal Welsh slate roof. There is a square plan, three bays, the middle bay in stone projecting under a pediment, containing a round-arched doorway with a rusticated surround, flanked by blocked windows with moulded surrounds. Attached to the east of the south lodge is a stone coped wall, and to the west is a low wall containing two sets of wrought iron gates.	II
5A and 6 Main Road; 52.88538°N 1.76161°W		Early 19th century	A pair of cottages in red brick with a dentilled eaves cornice and a tile roof. There are two storeys and three bays. On the front are two doorways and casement windows, all with segmental heads.	II
Butchers House, shop and 10 School Lane; 52.88534°N 1.76229°W		Early 19th century	A row of buildings that was extended in about 1874 by George Devey. They are in red brick with blue brick diapering, and have tile roofs with coped gables and plain kneelers. There are two storeys and a T-shaped plan, with a front range of eight bays and a three-bay rear wing. The shop front is timber framed and has a central doorway with a moulded arch and stable-type doors flanked by sash windows, and above is a coved cornice and a hipped roof. To the left are casement windows and a door with segmental heads, and a cart entrance. To the right is a doorway and sash windows, and the upper floor contains casement windows with flat heads. In the rear wing is a doorway with a round arch and a moulded surround, casement windows, and three half-dormers with hipped roofs.	II
Ice house 52.90250°N 1.75354°W	—	Early 19th century	The ice house to Sudbury Hall is in red brick, it has a circular plan, and is sunk into the ground and grassed over. It has a domed top, and there is a short tunnel vaulted entrance passage.	II
Sudbury County School; 52.88447°N 1.76194°W		1832	The school and caretaker's house are in red brick with sandstone dressings, and a Welsh slate roof with stone coped gables, a ridge ventilator and square finials. On the north and south sides of the schoolroom are covered ways with cast iron columns, partly infilled with brick, and above is a clerestory with Gothic-style casement windows. The house has two storeys, three bays and flanking single-storey wings. The middle bay projects under a pedimented gable, and has pilaster strips. Three steps lead up to a doorway with a hood mould, and the windows are in Gothic style.	II
Aston Bridge; 52.87731°N 1.75895°W		Early to mid 19th century	The bridge carries the A515 road over the River Dove. It is in sandstone, and consists of three shallow segmental arches, the centre one broader and taller. It has low cutwaters, stepped voussoirs, and a moulded string course. The parapets are canted and coped, and the walls end in paired piers.	II
84 and 85 Main Road; 52.88474°N 1.74649°W	—	c. 1840	A pair of cottages with a tile roof, brick coped gables and plain kneelers. There is a single storey with attics, and a symmetrical front of three bays. The middle bay projects under a gable, and contains a recessed porch with a chamfered Tudor arch and a hood mould. Above it is a single light window with a chamfered surround and a string course acting as a hood mould. In the ground floor of the outer bays are two-light casement windows with chamfered surrounds, wedge lintels, and hood moulds, and in the attics are gabled half-dormers.	II
Corner Cottage; 52.88543°N 1.76208°W		Mid 19th century	The house is in red brick, partly rendered, on a chamfered plinth, above is applied timber framing with plaster infill, and the roof is tiled. There are two storeys and attics, and a west front of four bays, with three symmetrical bays containing a central doorway, and a recessed brick bay to the right. The windows are casements, and there are two gabled dormers.	II
Meynell Hunt Kennels; 52.90032°N 1.76928°W	—	1874–77	The kennels were designed by George Devey, and are in red brick with a dentilled eaves cornice, and red tile roofs with blue tile diapering. There is a single storey and an unequal cross plan. In the centre is a feed room, with service rooms to the north, a draw yard to the south, two lodges on the sides, and four open pens to the south. The doorways, which have stable doors, and the windows, which are casements, have segmental heads, there is a circular ventilation hole, and at the top a wavy coped parapet. The open pens are enclosed by a concrete block wall containing eight piers with pyramidal finials.	II
Meynell Hunt Stables; 52.90042°N 1.76822°W	—	1874–77	The stable block and the attached cottage at the northeast corner were designed by George Devey, and are in red brick with orange brick diapering, a dentilled eaves cornice, and red tile roofs with blue tile diapering, coped Dutch gables and plain kneelers. They are in one and two storeys, and are arranged in an irregular plan around a courtyard. The south range has four bays, and a central Tudor arched double doorway with a chamfered surround, and a shaped parapet. There are two dormers with Dutch gables, and circular keyed windows. To the left is a two-storey tower with a floor band, a pyramidal roof, and a square clock turret with an ogee roof and a weathervane.	II
Pair of houses, Meynell Hunt; 52.89974°N 1.76831°W	—	1874–77	The houses, walls and outhouses were designed by George Devey. They are in red brick with orange brick diapering, and red tile roofs. The houses have a floor band, a dentilled eaves cornice, two storeys, and an irregular plan, with a west front of six bays. The doorway has a segmental head, the windows have a single light or are mullioned, and on the south front is a two-storey bay window. Attached to the east of the houses are walls and outhouses.	II
The Bothy; 52.88873°N 1.76715°W	—	c. 1875	A bothy, later an outbuilding, it is timber framed with plaster infill on a brick plinth, with a tile roof, a half-hipped gable with tile hanging, and gablets. There is a single storey, an L-shaped plan, and an apse to the east. The windows are mullioned.	II
Old gas works 52.88436°N 1.76369°W	—	1876–77	The gas works for Sudbury Hall, later used for other purposes, was designed by George Devey. It is in red brick with orange brick diapering, sandstone dressings, a dentilled eaves cornice, and a red tile roofs with blue tile diapering and Dutch gables. There is a single storey, a tall central section and lower wings. In the ground floor is a large opening with a steel lintel, above it is a blind opening with a brick relieving arch, and a circular ventilator. On the east front are doorways with chamfered stone surrounds and a circular ventilation hole.	II
Stabling, Sudbury Hall; 52.88593°N 1.76422°W	—	1892	The stable block, later used for other purposes, is in red brick with stone dressings, angle quoins, and a tile roof with stone coped gables and moulded kneelers. There are two storeys and a south front of five bays. At the west end is a doorway with a chamfered surround and an initialled datestone. To the right are five carriage entrances with segmental heads, and in the upper floor are mullioned windows.	II
