= St James the Apostle's Church, Bonsall =

St James the Apostle’s Church, Bonsall
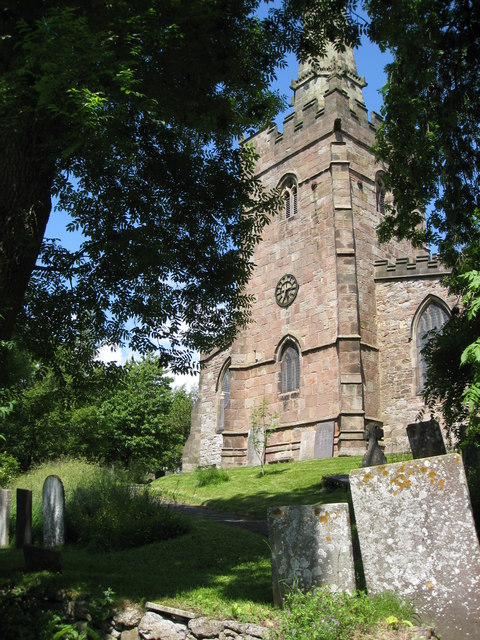
- St James the Apostle’s Church, Bonsall
- St James the Apostle’s Church, Bonsall
- 53°7′12.24″N 1°35′1.78″W
- OS grid reference: SK 27987 58133
- Location: Bonsall, Derbyshire
- Country: England
- Denomination: Church of England

History
- Dedication: St James the Apostle

Architecture
- Heritage designation: Grade II* listed

Administration
- Province: Canterbury
- Diocese: Derby
- Archdeaconry: Chesterfield
- Deanery: Wirksworth
- Parish: Bonsall

St James the Apostle's Church, Bonsall is a Grade II* listed parish church in the Church of England in Bonsall, Derbyshire.

== History ==
The church dates from the 13th century. In time it was filled with galleries and the chancel and tower were cut off from the rest of the church by screens of lath and plaster. This was all stripped out during a restoration between 1862 and 1863 by Ewan Christian which cost £1,550 (equivalent to £168,379 in 2025). The contractors were Francis and Fox of Cromford. It re-opened on 4 August 1863. A few weeks later it was reported that a new Oak communion table had been provided by Captain Prince, The Study, Bonsall, a stained glass window depicting the Apostles Peter and Paul by Edmundson and Son of Manchester had been given by the Revd. Robert Bickerstaff, Rector of Killead, Antrim, a pair of Glastonbury chairs from Revd. G. Bagot, and carved panels for the pulpit given by Mr. Clay.

== Parish status ==
The church is in a joint parish with

- All Saints' Church, Alderwasley
- All Saints' Church, Bradbourne
- All Saints’ Church, Ballidon
- St James’ Church, Brassington
- St Margaret's Church, Carsington
- All Saints’ Church, Elton
- St James’ Church, Idridgehay
- Holy Trinity Church, Kirk Ireton
- Holy Trinity Church, Middleton-by-Wirksworth
- St Mary's Church, Wirksworth

== Organ ==
The organ was installed by Fred Jardine of Manchester in 1867. A specification of the organ can be found on the National Pipe Organ Register.

== Bells ==
The church tower contains a ring of 6 bells with the tenor dating from 1731, and the 3rd dating from 1656.

== See also ==
- Grade II* listed buildings in Derbyshire Dales
- Listed buildings in Bonsall, Derbyshire
