= Listed buildings in Snelston =

Snelston is a civil parish in the Derbyshire Dales district of Derbyshire, England. The parish contains 21 listed buildings that are recorded in the National Heritage List for England. Of these, one is listed at Grade II*, the middle of the three grades, and the others are at Grade II, the lowest grade. The parish contains the village of Snelston and the surrounding countryside. The major building in the parish was the original Snelston Hall, which has been largely demolished. The remains of the hall are listed, together with associated structures, including the stable block that has been converted into the present Snelston Hall. The other listed buildings are a church, houses, farmhouses and cottages, a war memorial and a telephone kiosk.

== Key ==
| Gradea | Criteria |
|---|---|
| II* | Particularly important buildings of more than special interest |
| II | Buildings of national importance and special interest |

== Buildings ==
| Name and location | Photograph | Date | Notes | Grade |
|---|---|---|---|---|
| St Peter's Church; 52.98714°N 1.77005°W | | Early 15th century | The oldest part of the church is the tower, the rest of the church was almost completely rebuilt in 1825, and there were further alterations in 1907 by C. Hodgson Fowler. The church is built in sandstone with a slate roof, and consists of a nave, a north aisle, a chancel with a north vestry and chapel, and a tower at the west end of the aisle. The tower has two stages, stepped diagonal buttresses, a two-light mullioned west window with a four-centred arched head and a hood mould, a clock face on the west and east fronts, two-light bell openings, a moulded string course, corner gargoyles, an embattled parapet, and corner pinnacles. At the west end of the nave is a doorway with a four-centred arch, a crocketed ogee arch, and crocketed pilasters. Above it is a niche containing the figure of a saint, and a rose window with a chamfered surround. | II* |
| School Farmhouse; 52.98768°N 1.77406°W | | 17th century | A farmhouse and an earlier barn later integrated into a house, it is in sandstone and has a tile roof with stone coped gables and moulded kneelers. There are two storeys, the house has three bays, and the former barn to the left, is slightly lower and has two bays. On the house is a gabled porch with a four-centred arch, and the windows are mullioned with patterned casements. In front of the barn is a projecting bread oven containing a casement window, and to its left are two stepped buttresses and mullioned windows. | II |
| Old Queen Farmhouse; 52.97020°N 1.76703°W | — | Late 18th century | The farmhouse is in red brick with rendered gabled walls, painted brick dressings, a dentilled eaves cornice, and a tile roof. There are two storeys and attics, and three bays. In the centre is a gabled porch and a doorway with a four-centred arch, and the windows are casements with segmental-arched heads. | II |
| Outbuildings west of The Stanton Arms; 52.98782°N 1.77665°W | — | Early 19th century | The outbuildings are in red brick, and have a tile roof with stone coped gables and moulded kneelers. They form an L-shaped plan, and consist of a barn and stables with two storeys, and a cowshed with one storey. Most of the openings have four-centred arched heads, and some windows have segmental heads. Most of the front of the cowshed is open, and there are vents in a diamond pattern. | II |
| Ice house, Snelston Hall; 52.99018°N 1.76723°W | — | c. 1827 | The ice house in the grounds of the hall was designed by L. N. Cottingham. It is in red brick with stone copings, and consists of a circular well 4.5 metres (15 ft) in diameter and depth. The wall has a large cavity of 30 inches (760 mm), and it is capped at the top with stone slabs. The entrance is at the top of the dome, which is at ground level and has a stone surround. | II |
| Ruins of former Snelston Hall, walls and gates 52.98947°N 1.76663°W | — | 1827–37 | The house was designed by L. N. Cottingham in Neo-Gothic style, and was largely demolished in 1951. The remains are in sandstone and brick, and consist of one wall, with a courtyard to the north surrounded by walls containing a gateway. The remaining hall wall has a tower at each end, a continuous string course, and an embattled coped parapet. | II |
| Ashbourne Lodge; 52.99234°N 1.76152°W | | c. 1828 | The lodge to Snelston Hall, designed by L. N. Cottingham, is in pebbledashed stone with stone dressings and a tile roof with decorative bargeboards. There is a single storey and two bays. On the west front is an open porch that has a four-centred arch, imposts with carved heads, wooden gates, and a finial on the gable. To the south, and in the south front, are windows with moulded surrounds, pointed lights and pierced spandrels, and in the north front is a canted bay window. | II |
| Walls and gates, Ashbourne Lodge; 52.99238°N 1.76164°W | — | c. 1828 | The gate piers are in sandstone with an octagonal plan, and the capitals have pyramidal tops with cable moulding. They are flanked by stone walls with moulded copings, stepped up to the central piers, and ending in small octagonal piers with octagonal domed capitals. The gates are wooden with decorative ironwork. | II |
| Church Lodge; 52.98691°N 1.76937°W | | c. 1828 | The lodge to Snelston Hall, designed by L. N. Cottingham, is in painted brick with applied timber framing, and has a tile roof with overhanging eaves on large pierced brackets, and cusped wavy bargeboards. There is a single storey and attics, and two bays. On the west front is a long open gabled porch with a zigzagged semicircular-arch and turned baluster rails, and a projecting bay with a canted oriel window. The north front contains a false oriel window, in the south wall is a canted bay window, and the windows are casements. | II |
| Fountain, Snelston Hall; 52.98911°N 1.76643°W | — | c. 1828 | The fountain in the grounds of the hall, which was designed by L. N. Cottingham, is in sandstone, and has an octagonal plan with extra lobes on four sides. The walls are about 2 feet (0.61 m) high and moulded on the outside. In the centre is an octagonal moulded pier with a frieze of shields. This splays outwards at the top and has a cornice containing carved heads with lead pipes in the mouths, and over this is the base for a basin. | II |
| Gates and walls, Snelston Hall; 52.98689°N 1.76955°W | — | c. 1828 | The gateway and walls at the entrance to the grounds of the hall were designed by L. N. Cottingham. Flanking the drive are sandstone octagonal gate piers with octagonal ogee finials on tapering stems. On each side of the piers are long thin niches containing small spheres. Attached to the piers are curving walls with moulded copings, stepped up near the piers. At the ends are plainer octagonal piers with moulded cornices, and tops consisting of a tapering octagonal base, a moulded band, and an upturned ogee octagonal finial. The gates are in timber with decorative metal work. | II |
| The Old Post Office; 52.98787°N 1.77464°W | | c. 1828 | The house was designed by L. N. Cottingham, and is in red brick with stone dressings, quoins, applied timber framing to the upper storey, and a stone slate roof with overhanging eaves. There is a single storey with attics, three gabled bays with finials, and flanking single-storey single-bay wings. The middle bay projects, it has a larger gable and contains a four-centred arch. The windows are mullioned with four-centred arched lights, incised spandrels, and hood moulds. The upper storey of the middle bay is jettied, and above the window is a wooden Maltese cross. The outer bays have dormers on brackets, and all the windows are casements. | II |
| The Stanton Arms and stable block 52.98768°N 1.77618°W | | c. 1828 | The public house and attached stable block were designed by L. N. Cottingham, and have been converted into flats. The building is in red brick with sandstone dressings, and a tile roof with stone coped gables, moulded kneelers and finials. There are two storeys, the house has a coved eaves band, and the stable block has a dentilled cornice. The house has four bays, the outer bays projecting and gabled. In the centre is a gabled porch containing a four-centred arch, and a massive stone lintel, with a crest above, and flanked by lancet windows. The windows in the ground floor are mullioned and transomed, in the upper floor they are mullioned, in the left gable is a lancet window, and the right gable contains a coat of arms. The stable block has three bays, the middle bay projecting and gabled, and it contains a four-centred arched doorway with a mullioned window above. | II |
| Brookside; 52.98673°N 1.77349°W | | c. 1840 | The house is in red brick with applied timber framing, and tile roofs with overhanging eaves and decorative wavy bargeboards. There is a single storey with attics, a main range of three gabled bays, and flanking single-storey bays. In the centre is an open timber framed porch, and the windows are casements with moulded four-centred arches. | II |
| School House Cottages; 52.98750°N 1.77428°W | — | 1849 | A school and schoolmaster's house, later two cottages, they are in red brick with sandstone dressings, and a tile roof with stone coped gables, moulded kneelers and ridge finials. Each cottage has two bays, the inner bay with a single storey, and the outer bays forming a gabled cross-wing with an attic. The outer bays have diagonal corner buttresses, mullioned windows, and a vent in the gable. In the centre bays are an arch with imposts and doorways, all with four-centred arched heads, and mullioned windows with segmental heads. | II |
| Brookside Cottages; 52.98709°N 1.77540°W | — | Mid 19th century | A row of three cottages in red brick with a dentilled eaves cornice, and tile roofs with decorative bargeboards, finials and pendants. There are two storeys, five bays, the middle bay projecting and gabled, and flanking single-storey lean-tos. In the centre is a bracketed porch roof, flanked by cross windows with four-centred arched lights and hood moulds, the other windows are mullioned, some with hood moulds, and the window over the porch has a bracketed hood. | II |
| Snelston Hall, outbuildings and stable block 52.98746°N 1.76740°W | | Mid 19th century | A stable block around a courtyard, converted into a house and outbuildings in 1952. The house to the east is in sandstone on a plinth, with a floor band, a coved eaves cornice, and a hipped tile roof. There are two storeys and seven bays. On the front are three four-centred arches, one containing a doorway, and the windows are mullioned and transomed in the ground floor and mullioned above. The outbuildings form rear ranges, and are in red brick with stone dressings, and have tile roofs with stone coped gables and moulded kneelers. They have a single storey, each range has a central gabled bay with a four-centred arch, and the windows are casements. At the west end is a single bay, and low brick walls ending in brick piers with elaborately decorated urns. | II |
| Outbuildings west of Snelston Hall; 52.98754°N 1.76825°W | — | Mid 19th century | The outbuildings, which form three sides of a square around a courtyard, are in red brick with dressings in stone and brick, eaves bands, stone coped gables and moulded kneelers. There are two storeys, and the west wing has five bays, and curving single-storey side wings. The middle bay projects under a gable, and contains a doorway with a four-centred arched head and stone quoins to the jambs. On the roof is a square timber dovecote with an iron weathervane. Most of the openings have four-centred arched heads. The courtyard is closed by brick walls with stone copings and central wooden gates. | II |
| Boat House and Summer House, Snelston Hall; 52.98873°N 1.76774°W | — | 1907 | The boat house with a summer house above is in rendered stone with stone dressings, a tile roof, and a central gable with a finial and a pendant. There is a single storey and a basement, and a single bay. The boat house has a semicircular rusticated arch with a central rusticated pier. Above, the summer house has double doors with a hood mould and a balcony, and in the gable is a diamond-shaped datestone. | II |
| War memorial 52.98775°N 1.77584°W | | c. 1920 | The war memorial is in a circular enclosure by a road junction. It is in stone, and has an octagonal base with a moulded plinth, on which is an octagonal banded shaft with an interlace pattern on the front. At the top is a crocketed Latin cross, and at the junction with the shaft are carved figures of saints set in ogee-headed niches with pilasters. On the base are inscriptions and the names of those lost in the two World Wars. | II |
| Telephone kiosk 52.98737°N 1.77272°W | | 1935 | The K6 type telephone kiosk in Church Road was designed by Giles Gilbert Scott. Constructed in cast iron with a square plan and a dome, it has three unperforated crowns in the top panels. | II |
