= Callow Hall Hotel =

Historic house in Derbyshire, England

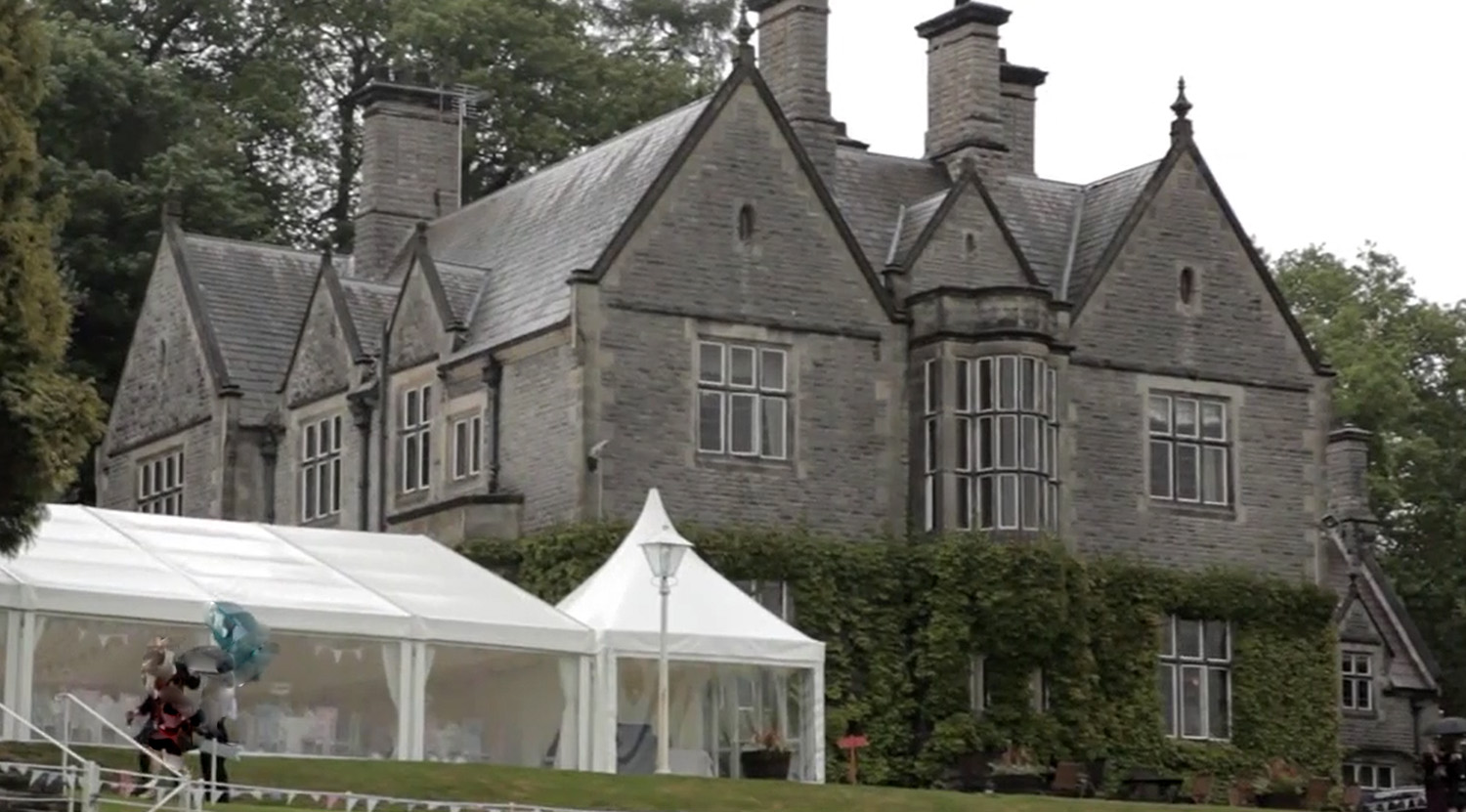
- Callow Hall Hotel

- Location within Derbyshire Location within the United Kingdom

General information
- Location: Ashbourne, Derbyshire, England
- Coordinates: 53.02118°N 1.74731°W
- Construction started: 1849
- Completed: 1852

Design and construction
- Designations

Listed Building – Grade II
- Official name: Callow Hall Hotel
- Designated: 14 June 1984
- Reference no.: 1281646

Callow Hall Hotel is a house of historical significance in Derbyshire, England. It lies 0.5 mile west of the town of Ashbourne, within the civil parish of Mapleton. It was built from 1849 to 1852 by H. J. Stevens for John Goodwin Johnson, a local magistrate. It was a private residence for over a century and then became a hotel in 1982. It is still a hotel which provides accommodation and restaurant services and caters for special events particularly weddings.

It is now a Grade II listed building.

== John Goodwin Johnson ==
John Goodwin Johnson was the originator of Callow Hall. He was born in 1814 in Bradbourne, Derbyshire. His father was John Goodwin Johnson (1771–1838) who owned a substantial amount of property in Fenny Bentley. John was educated at Trinity College, Cambridge University. In 1838 at the age of 24 he inherited his father’s estates. In 1842 he married Martha Elizabeth Goodwin (1813–1873) who was the daughter Francis Goodwin of Mapleton. The couple had no children.

John was very active in the local community affairs. He was a magistrate and deputy lieutenant for Derbyshire and also a magistrate for Staffordshire. He died in 1871 and his wife remained at Callow Hall until her death two years later in 1873. As they had no children the Hall was left to John’s sister Mary Goodwin Buckston who at that time was the widow of Rev. Henry Thomas Buckston (1807–1842).

== The Buckstone family ==
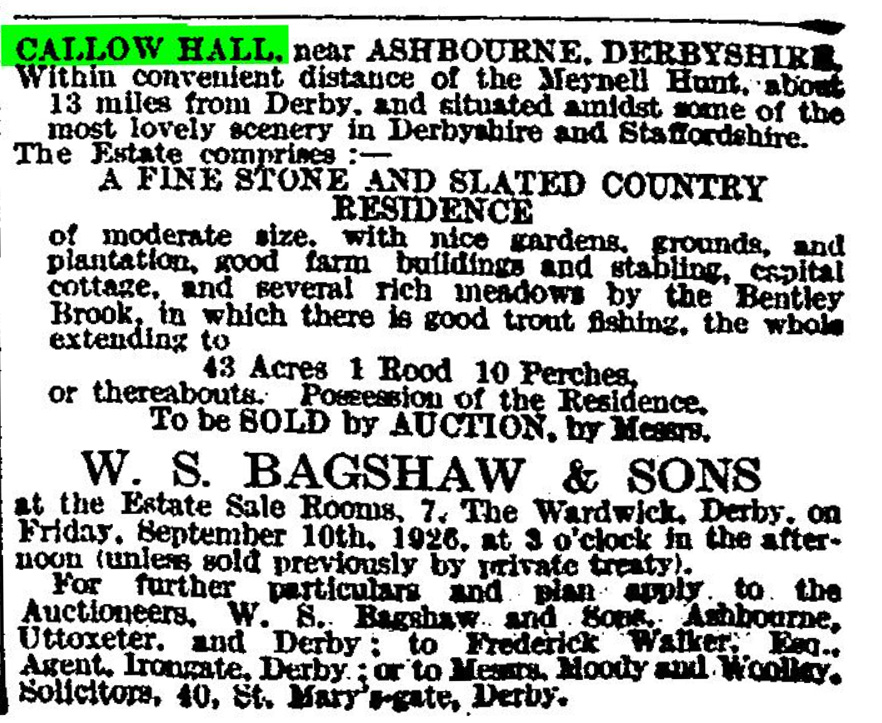
Sale notice for Callow Hall 1926

Mary Goodwin Buckston, John’s sister, was born Mary Goodwin Johnson. She married Rev Henry Thomas Buckston (1807–1842) in 1832 and the couple had two sons Henry and George. When Mary inherited Callow Hall in 1873 she lived there until her death in 1880 and the property was inherited by her son Rev Henry Buckston (1835–1916). He was the vicar at Hope, Derbyshire for over thirty years and so Callow Hall was rented during this time. After his retirement in 1903 he and his wife Eliza Amy went to live at Sutton-On-the Hill which was another property that he owned. He died in 1916 and his widow Eliza Amy Buckston (1846–1926) moved to Callow Hall. When she died in 1926 the Hall was put on the market. The sale notice is shown. Arthur Frederick Longdon bought the property.

== The Longdon family ==
Arthur Frederick Longdon (1860–1938) was born in 1860 in Quarndon, Derbyshire. His father was Frederick Longdon who owned a firm called Frederick Longdon and Co which made surgical bandages. In 1895 Arthur married Helen Mary Francis (1869–1949) the daughter of Alfred Ollivant Francis who was a surgeon.

Arthur entered the family firm and later became the head of the business. He was also a borough magistrate and a member of the Town Council. He died in 1938 and Callow Hall was sold to George Edinmore Gather.

== The Gather family ==
George Edinmore Gather (1900–1975) was born in Ashbourne in 1900. His father George Edinmore Gather (1850–1928) was Chairman of the clothing company Richard Cooper and Co (Ashbourne) and lived at “the Firs” in Ashbourne. ). When his father died in 1928 George inherited a great deal of money. The couple had five children – a boy and four girls. George became chairman and managing director of his father’s firm and was a member of the executive committee of the Trades Association. He obtained an Order of the British Empire (OBE). He died in 1975 at the age of 75. His wife Kathleen continued to live at Callow Hall for some time. In 1982 it was then sold to the Spencer family who converted it to a hotel. It continues as a hotel today under ownership of the Hardman family.
