= Matlock Bridge =

Road bridge over river in centre of Matlock town

Coordinates: 53.1379°N 1.5561°W

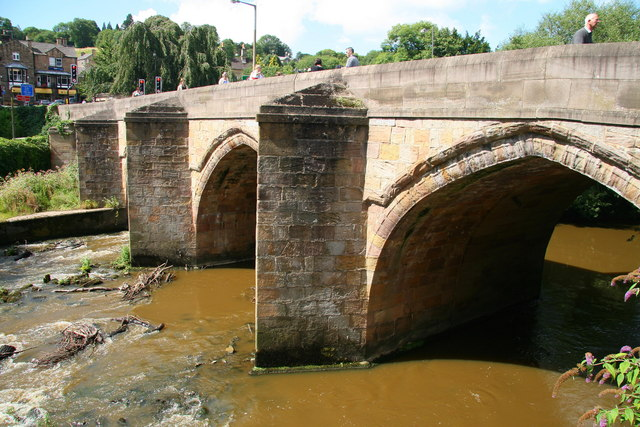
Matlock Bridge with piers V-shaped as cutwaters

Matlock Bridge also known as Derwent Bridge, is a stone bridge spanning the River Derwent in Matlock town centre, Derbyshire, England. The bridge dates back to the 15th century, and is a Grade II* listed structure.

== History ==
A ford originally crossed the river at this point, and the side became a major crossing point. A settlement developed around the bridge, known as Matlock Bridge, which later became part of modern Matlock.

The bridge was made into one-way for vehicles in 2007.

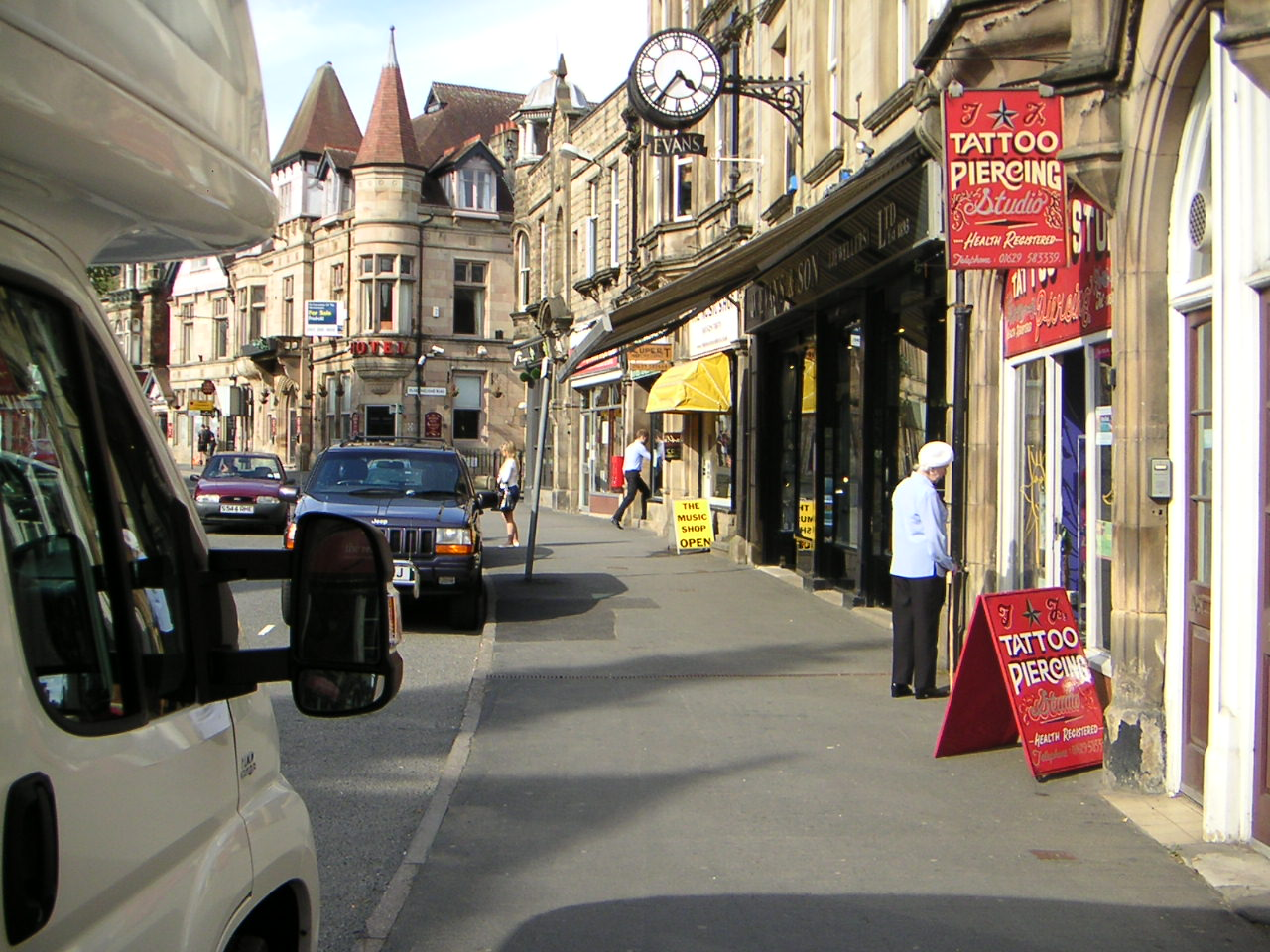
Dale Road (A6) in 2010, close to the edge of Matlock Bridge Conservation Area looking towards the bridge itself, showing some of the independent shops and businesses

Matlock Bridge Conservation Area was established in 1989, but was further widened in 2008 and includes an area on both sides of the river. It contains 283 buildings, of which three are listed structures, including the bridge itself.

In May 2022, the Environment Agency announced nearby repair work to failed flood defences close to the bridge and immediately alongside the River Derwent would mean the bridge returning to two-way traffic for a temporary period. Additionally, the bridge's superstructure was altered to include the installation of a safety vehicle restraint system, a run of fabricated steel side-barriers to protect pedestrians and the bridge fabric from any damage from passing traffic.

With no direct access to the repair-site, a major contributor to the scheme was 'Lifty McShifty', an 800-ton crane sited on Derwent Way, a short closed section of the A6 road, used to position plant and materials as needed. The project is expected to be halfway-completed by Christmas 2022 with the cost anticipated to be around £5 million. In May 2023, the Environment Agency announced completion of structural repair work to the flood barrier, with cosmetic improvements involving local stone cladding underway and the A6 road expected to be re-opened in September.

== See also ==
- Grade II* listed buildings in Derbyshire Dales
- Listed buildings in Matlock Town
