= Listed buildings in Bonsall, Derbyshire =

Bonsall is a civil parish in the Derbyshire Dales district of Derbyshire, England. The parish contains 13 listed buildings that are recorded in the National Heritage List for England. Of these, two are listed at Grade II*, the middle of the three grades, and the others are at Grade II, the lowest grade. The parish contains the village of Bonsall and the surrounding area. The listed buildings consist of houses, cottages and associated structures, a farmhouse and an outbuilding, a market cross, two churches, a public house, a sawmill converted for residential use, and a telephone kiosk.

== Key ==
Grade	Criteria
II*	Particularly important buildings of more than special interest
II	Buildings of national importance and special interest

== Buildings ==
Name and location	Photograph	Date	Notes	Grade
St James' Church; 53.11969°N 1.58328°W		13th century	The church has been altered and extended through the centuries, and the outer walls were almost completely rebuilt in 1862–63 by Ewan Christian. The church is built in stone, and consists of a nave, north and south aisles, a south porch, a chancel, and a west steeple partly embraced by the aisles. The steeple has a tower with diagonal buttresses, a clock face, an embattled parapet, corner pinnacles, and a recessed spire with two ornamental bands. The body of the church is also embattled.	II*
Market Cross; 53.12112°N 1.58430°W		Late 14th or early 15th century	The market cross is in the centre of a road junction, and is in stone. It stands on a circular base of 13 concentric steps, and is surmounted by a ball finial added in the 1670s.	II*
8 and 10 High Street; 53.12150°N 1.58431°W		Mid 17th century	A house later divided, it is in stone with quoins and a tile roof. There are two storeys and four bays. On the front are two doorways with chamfered surrounds, one with a moulded hood on brackets. The windows are casements in moulded surrounds, and there are two gabled dormers with obelisk finials.	II
Yew Tree Farmhouse; 53.11939°N 1.59250°W	—	Mid 17th century	The farmhouse, which was rebuilt in 1723, is in limestone with gritstone quoins, a chamfered eaves band, and a Welsh slate roof with coped gables. There are three storeys, three bays, and a lean-to on the right. The doorway has a moulded quoined surround, and above it is a dated and initialled plaque. The windows were originally mullioned, but most have been altered and some mullions removed.	II
King's Head Public House and 64 and 66 Yeoman Street; 53.12101°N 1.58441°W		c. 1675	The public house and adjoining houses are in stone with tile roofs, and they have two storeys and attics. The public house is the oldest, and has two gabled bays with ball finials, the left larger and projecting. Most of the windows are mullioned, and there is an attic dormer. The houses date from the late 17th or early 18th century. They have two square-headed doorways with chamfered surrounds, one with a porch, most of the windows are casements, and in the gable end is a mullioned window.	II
Manor House; 53.12166°N 1.58473°W	—	Late 17th century	The house is in stone with string courses, moulded cornices, and a tile roof. There is an irregular T-shaped plan, with a main range of three storeys, a wing with two storeys and an attic, and a square-headed doorway with a chamfered surround in the angle. The windows are mullioned, and there are attic dormers.	II
1 High Street; 53.12131°N 1.58468°W	—	Late 17th or early 18th century	A range of buildings at right angles to the street, they are in stone with a tile roof and ball finials. On the front are two doorways with chamfered surrounds, and mullioned windows with two or three lights. On the gable end are steps leading to a modern doorway.	II
Outbuilding east of Yew Tree Farmhouse; 53.1194°N 1.59229°W	—	1734	The outbuilding, which was extended in the 19th century, is in limestone with gritstone dressings, and a roof of stone slate and blue tile with coped gables and moulded kneelers. There are two storeys, a single bay, and a later lean-to at the rear. In the centre is a doorway with a bonded surround, and above it is a datestone. To the right are external steps leading to a doorway, with three casement windows to its left. At the rear is a pigsty with a walled enclosure and two feeding troughs. Above are casement windows, and fragments of a moulded eaves band.	II
Slinter Wood; 53.11080°N 1.57324°W		c. 1760	Originally a sawmill, later converted for residential use, it is in stone with a tile roof. There are two storeys and five bays, and the windows are casements. Attached is a gabled enclosure containing a small disused undershot waterwheel with open wooden spoons.	II
Abbey House; 53.11900°N 1.58989°W		Late 18th century	The house is in stone with quoins and a slate roof. There are three storeys and three bays. The central doorway has a moulded surround, and the windows are sashes.	II
Sycamore House; 53.12363°N 1.58844°W	—	Late 18th century	A house in late Georgian style, it is in stone, partly roughcast, with quoins, and a slate roof with coped gables and kneelers. There are two storeys, three bays, a recessed bay on the left, and a rear wing. The windows are sashes in plain surrounds. Enclosing the garden is a retaining stone wall with wrought iron railings.	II
Baptist Church, railings, gate piers and walls 53.12047°N 1.58500°W	—	1824	The church is in rendered limestone with gritstone dressings and a blue tile roof. There is a front of three bays containing three tall, round-arched small-pane windows. To the right is a round-arched doorway, above which is an inscribed and dated plaque. The grounds of the church are enclosed by coped limestone walls that contain square gate piers with depressed pyramidal caps and metal lamp fittings. There is an iron gate, and railings flank the path to the door and along the front of the church.	II
Telephone kiosk 53.11885°N 1.58981°W	—	1935	The K6 type telephone kiosk opposite the Barley Mow public house was designed by Giles Gilbert Scott. Constructed in cast iron with a square plan and a dome, it has three unperforated crowns in the top panels.	II
