= Old House Museum, Bakewell =

Museum in Bakewell, Derbyshire, England

Bakewell Old House Museum
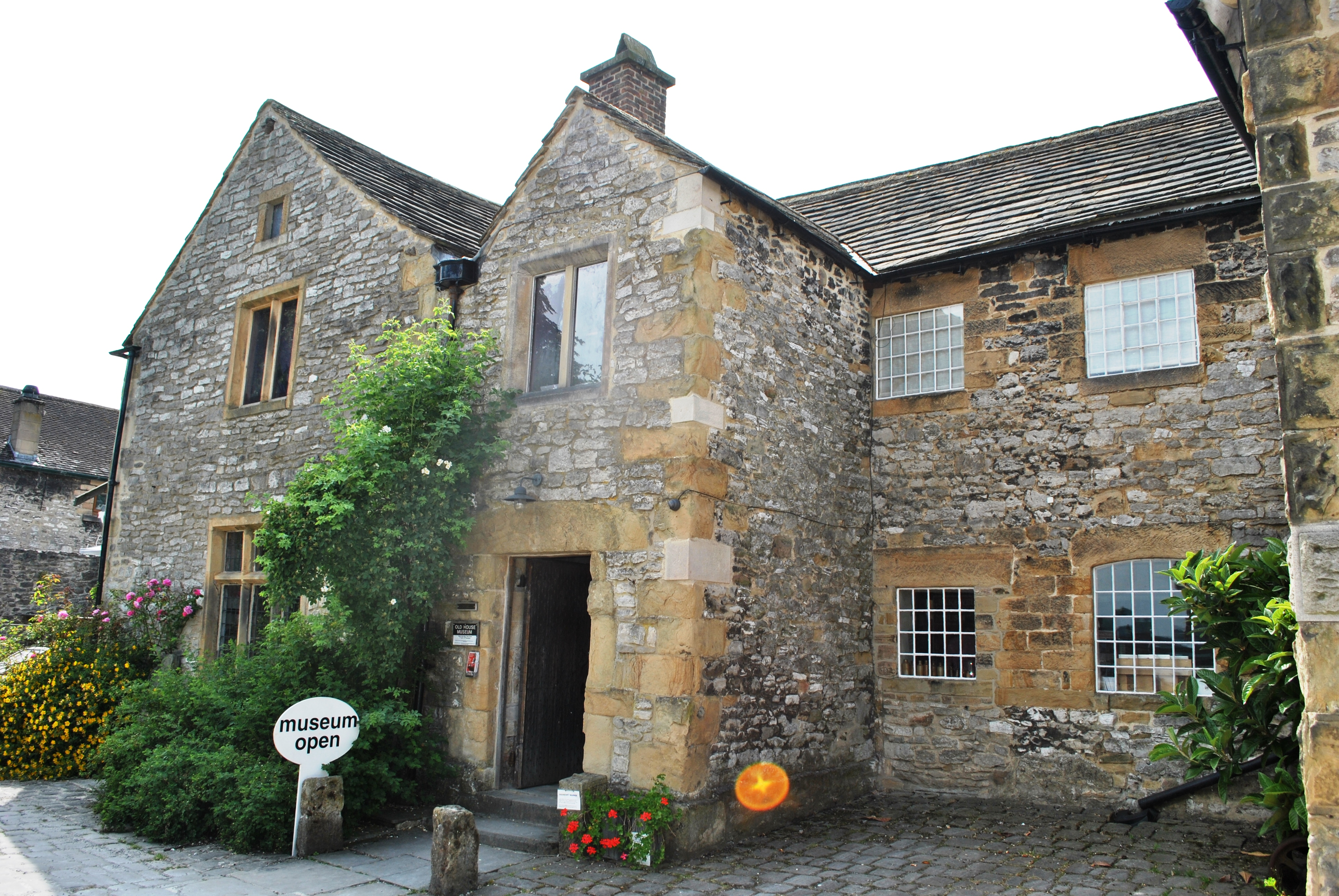

- Location within Derbyshire
- Location: Bakewell, Derbyshire
- Coordinates: 53.2135°N 1.6798°W
- Website: www.oldhousemuseum.org.uk

Listed Building – Grade II*
- Official name: Old House Museum including mounting block
- Designated: 20 April 1954
- Reference no.: 1247512

The Bakewell Old House Museum in the town of Bakewell in Derbyshire is a typical 16th-century yeoman's house that now houses a museum. It tells the story of the house as well as the lives of people from Bakewell and this part of the Peak District.

== History ==
The house was originally owned by the Dean and Chapter of Lichfield, and was built as a tithe (tax collector's dwelling). Built in 1534 of vernacular construction it formed the four southern rooms of the present building. The house was extended in 1549 reflecting the growing prosperity from the tithe collecting.

The building is Grade II* listed.

== Admission ==
It covers the lives of its former inhabitants including Christopher Plant, the Tudor tithe collector; Sir Richard Arkwright who quartered his mill workers in the building; and the Pitt family who lived in one of the cottages in the Victorian era.

== See also ==
- Grade II* listed buildings in Derbyshire Dales
- Listed buildings in Bakewell
