= St Peter's Church, Snelston =

St Peter’s Church, Snelston
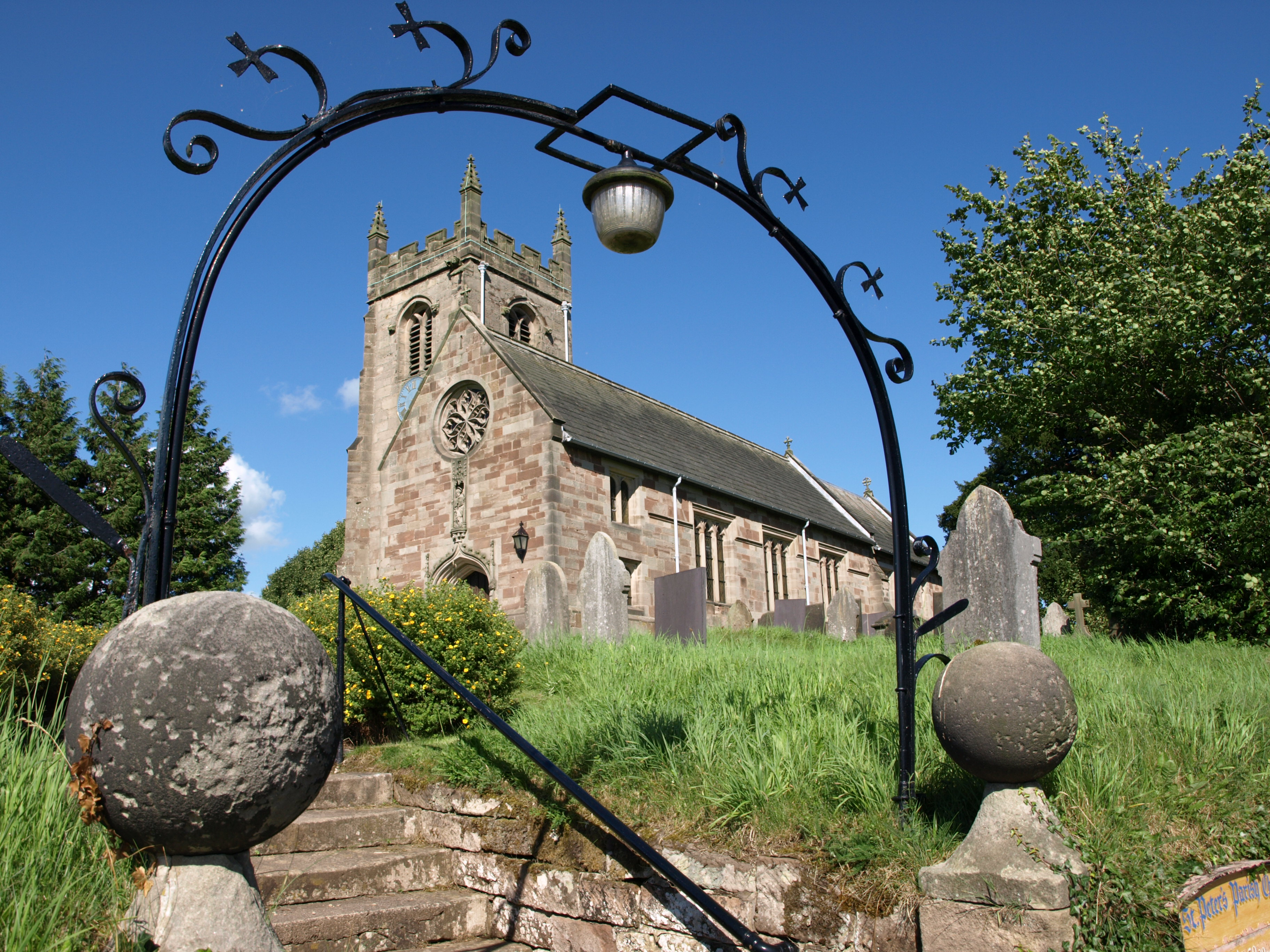
- St Peter’s Church, Snelston
- St Peter’s Church, Snelston
- 52°59′14.15″N 1°46′11.33″W
- OS grid reference: SK 15540 43332
- Location: Snelston, Derbyshire
- Country: England
- Denomination: Church of England

History
- Dedication: St Peter

Architecture
- Heritage designation: Grade II* listed

Administration
- Province: Canterbury
- Diocese: Derby
- Archdeaconry: Derby
- Deanery: Ashbourne
- Parish: Snelston

St Peter's Church, Snelston is a Grade II* listed parish church in the Church of England in Snelston, Derbyshire.

== History ==
The church dates from the early 15th century. The main body of the church was rebuilt in 1825, and there were further major alterations in 1907 by Charles Hodgson Fowler paid for by Mrs. Henry Stanton. The nave was lengthened westwards by 10 feet (3.0 m) when a new western doorway surmounted by a niche holding the figure of St Peter was inserted. A larger arch was built at the entrance to the chancel, and a carved oak screen was provided. The chancel was re-floored with black and white marble and a new reredos of oak and alabaster was inserted. A new choir vestry was provided. The contractor was Messrs Bowman and Sons of Stamford. The decoration work was carried out by Mr. Ashforth of Lincoln, and Mr. Bridgeman of Lichfield. The opening service took place on 16 October 1907 attended by the Bishop of Southwell.

The church was subjected to an unhappy dispute between the Squire and Parson which started in 1916. In 1915 the Revd. J.M. Trevor was inducted as an incumbent. Mrs. Stanton from Snelston Hall, the servants and tenants were regular attenders at the services, and Mrs. Stanton conducted the choir. On the last Sunday in 1916, the Rector returning from 3 weeks of illness, was notified by the organist that Mrs. Stanton did not want the psalms to be sung at Sunday evening service. He said he would leave the matter to the congregation, but as there was a good number present when the service started, he decided that the psalms would be sung. The next morning he received a letter from Mrs Stanton who was annoyed by his decision. She cut off the subscription of £10 towards the organist's salary. This culminated in the Stantons and Retinue no longer attending, and the families of the village stayed away too. In a further escalation, the male members of the choir, who were employees of the Squire, no longer attended, and the electric light, provided by the plant at Snelston Hall, was cut off. The Rector was denied access to keys kept at the Hall which gave access to the church clock and belfry, until a letter from the Bishop's lawyer arrived. Things were still unresolved when the new wardens were appointed in April 1921.

== Parish status ==
The church is in a joint parish with

- St Mary and St Barlock's Church, Norbury

== Organ ==
A pipe organ was built by Gray & Davison in 1877. A specification of the organ can be found on the National Pipe Organ Register.

== Bells ==
The church tower contains 3 bells, One from 1635 by George Oldfield, another from 1755 by Thomas Hedderley, and the last of 1688 by George Oldfield. The bells were re-hung in 1907.

== See also ==
- Grade II* listed buildings in Derbyshire Dales
- Listed buildings in Snelston
