= Snelston =

Village in Derbyshire, England

Coordinates: 52.988°N 1.776°W

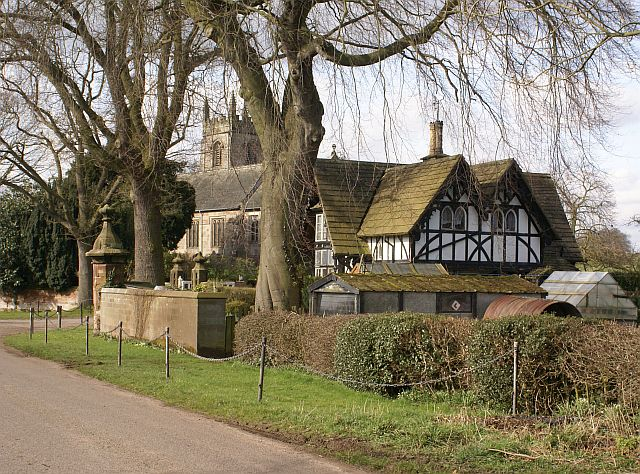
- The lodge and church

- Location within Derbyshire
- Population: 202 (2011)
- OS grid reference: SK151434
- Civil parish: Snelston
- District: Derbyshire Dales
- Shire county: Derbyshire
- Region: East Midlands
- Country: England
- Sovereign state: United Kingdom
- Post town: ASHBOURNE
- Postcode district: DE6
- Police: Derbyshire
- Fire: Derbyshire
- Ambulance: East Midlands

Snelston is a village and civil parish in the Derbyshire Dales district, in the county of Derbyshire, England. It is three miles south-west of Ashbourne. The parish includes Anacrehill. The population of the parish as of the 2011 census was 202. A tributary of the River Dove flows through its centre.

== Description ==
The building in the foreground of the photo above is Lower Lodge which stands at the entrance of Snelston Hall. Beyond the lodge is St Peter's Church, Snelston.

The Domesday Book of 1096 listed Snelston in the ancient hundred of Appletree.

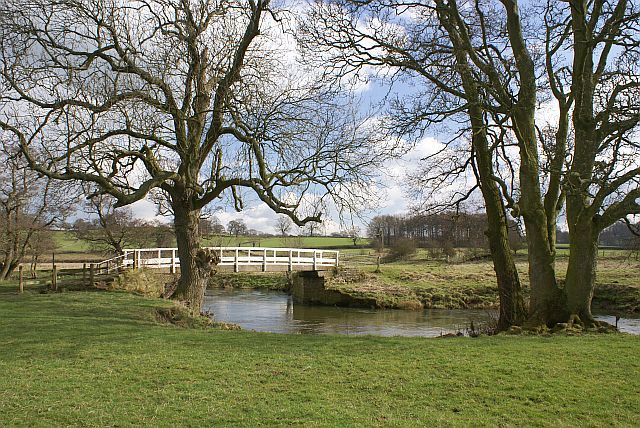
Toadhole Foot Bridge - this crosses the River Dove as it meanders through its wide flood plain. Beyond the river is Staffordshire.

Snelston Hall was built in 1827 and was demolished in 1951. The local squire, John Harrison had the village remodelled and a new school built in 1847. The village buildings were designed by the architect Lewis Nockalls Cottingham. This is now a model village.

The parish church of St Peter was substantially rebuilt (except for the tower) in 1825. It is one of the few churches to have had dances regularly held on the roof.

== Notable residents ==
- Michael Sadler, MP, factory reformer, was born here in 1780. He reformed the laws for children working in factories.
- Hannah Allen, a writer who suffered from religious insanity, was born here in 1638.

== See also ==
- Listed buildings in Snelston

== Gallery ==
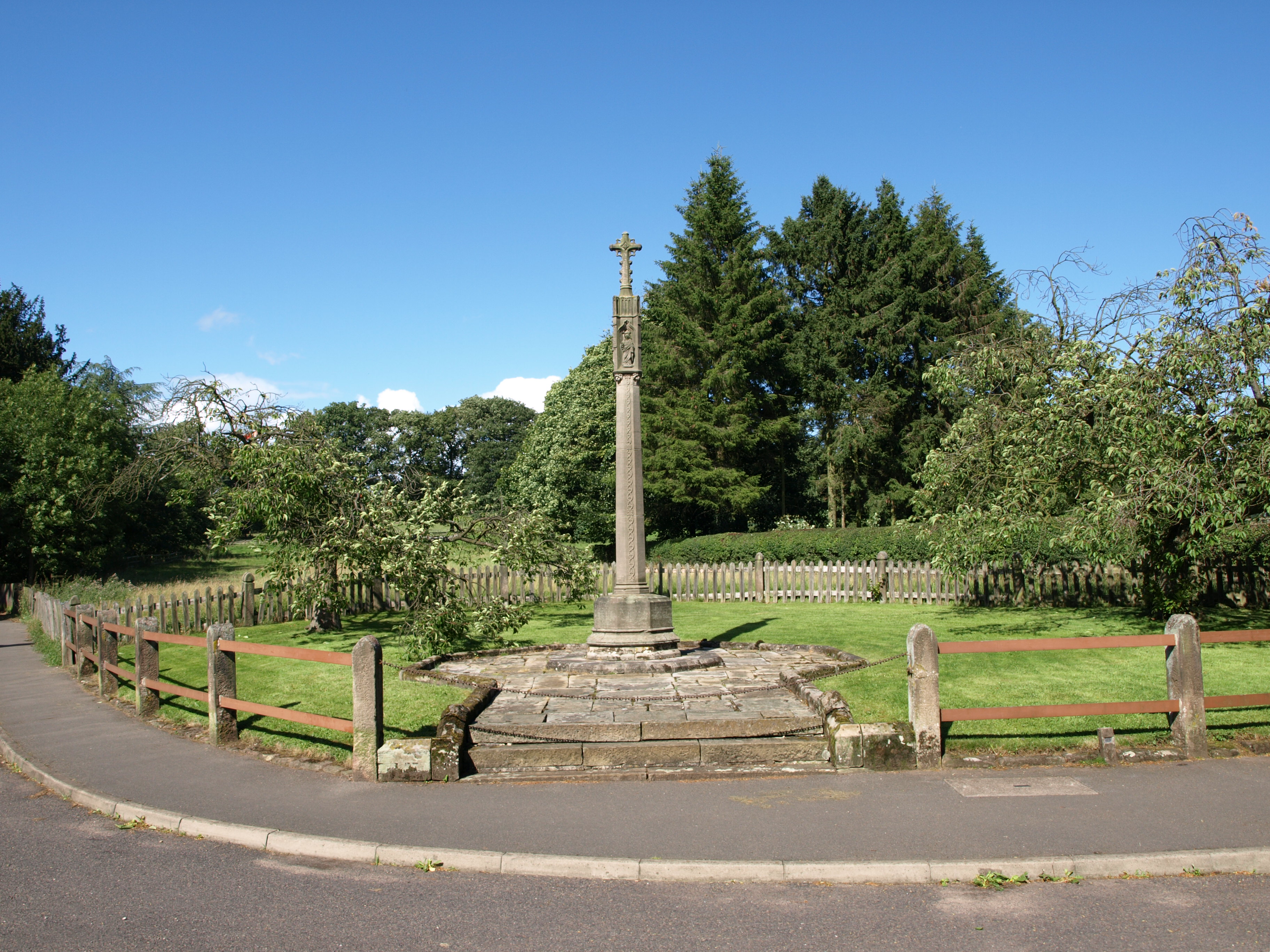
The war memorial

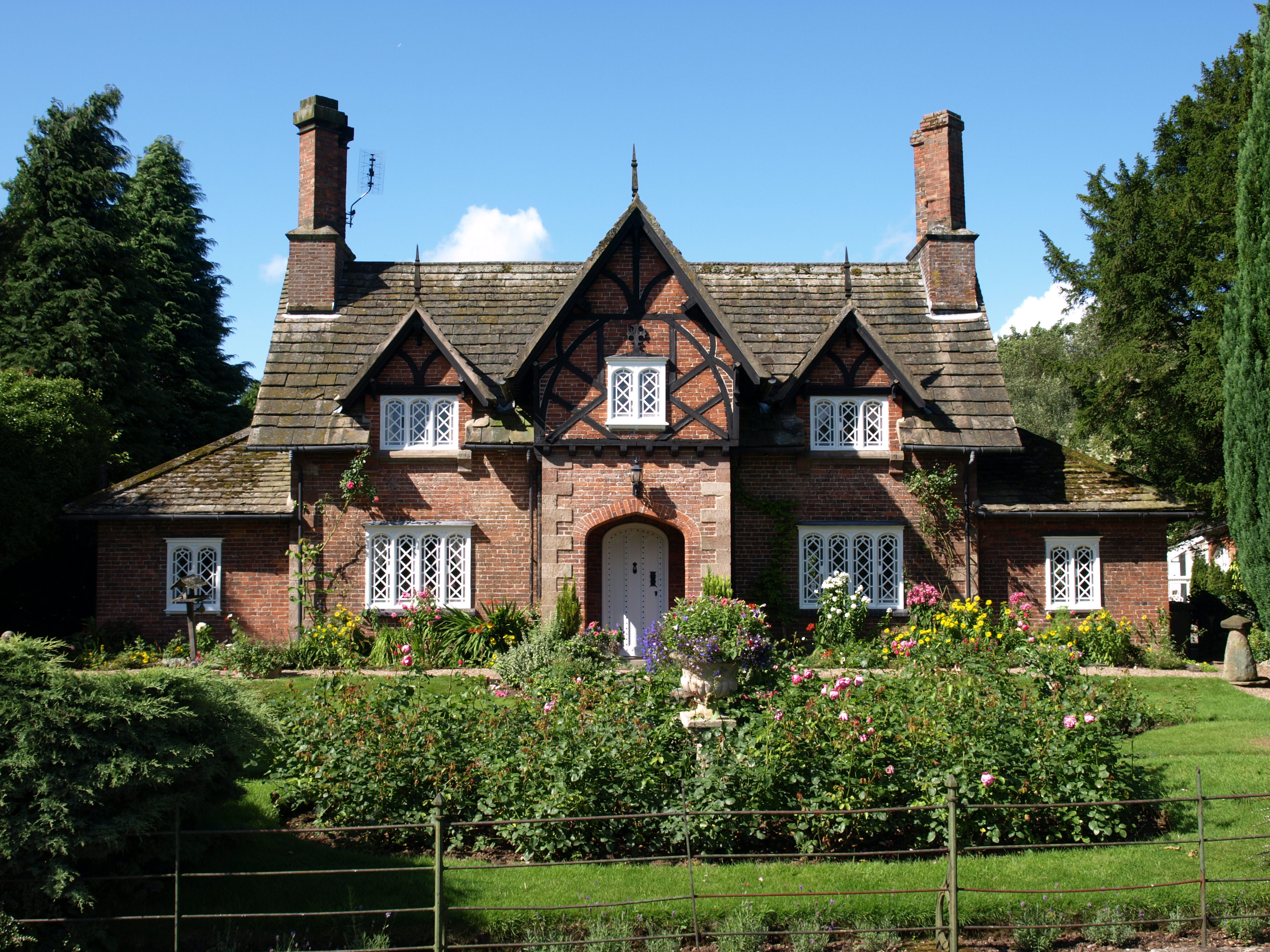
The Old Post Office

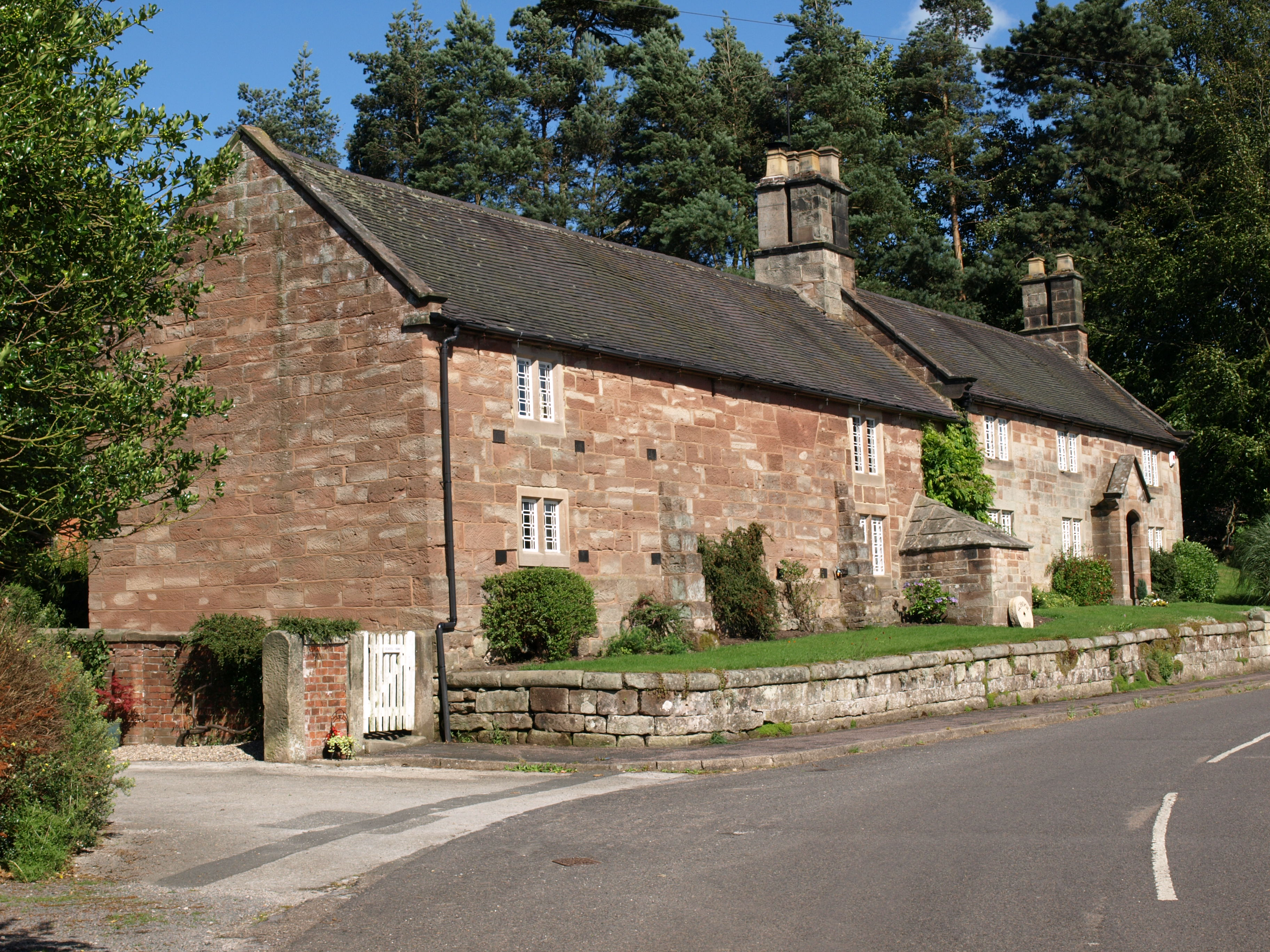
School Farm

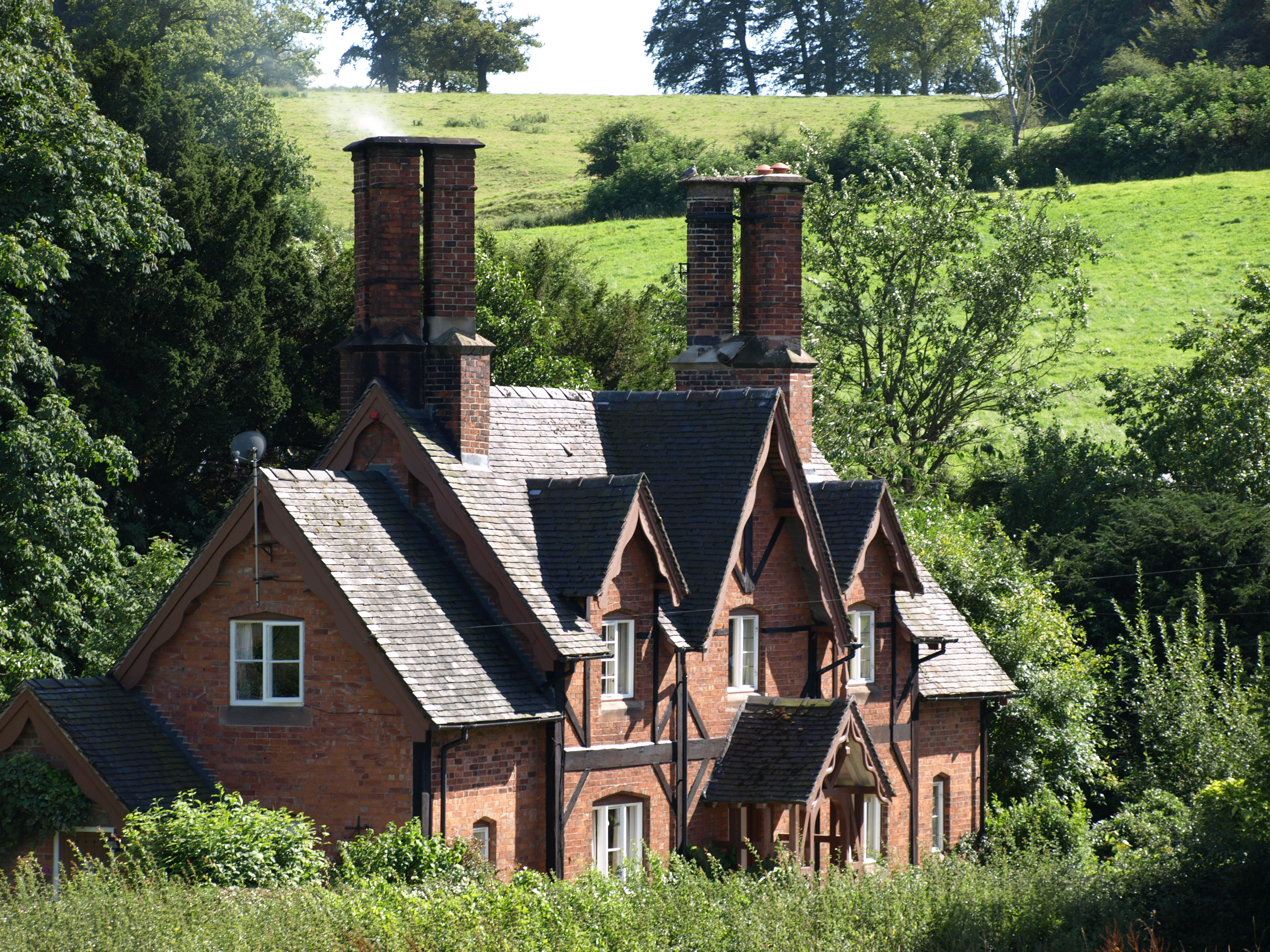
Brook Cottages

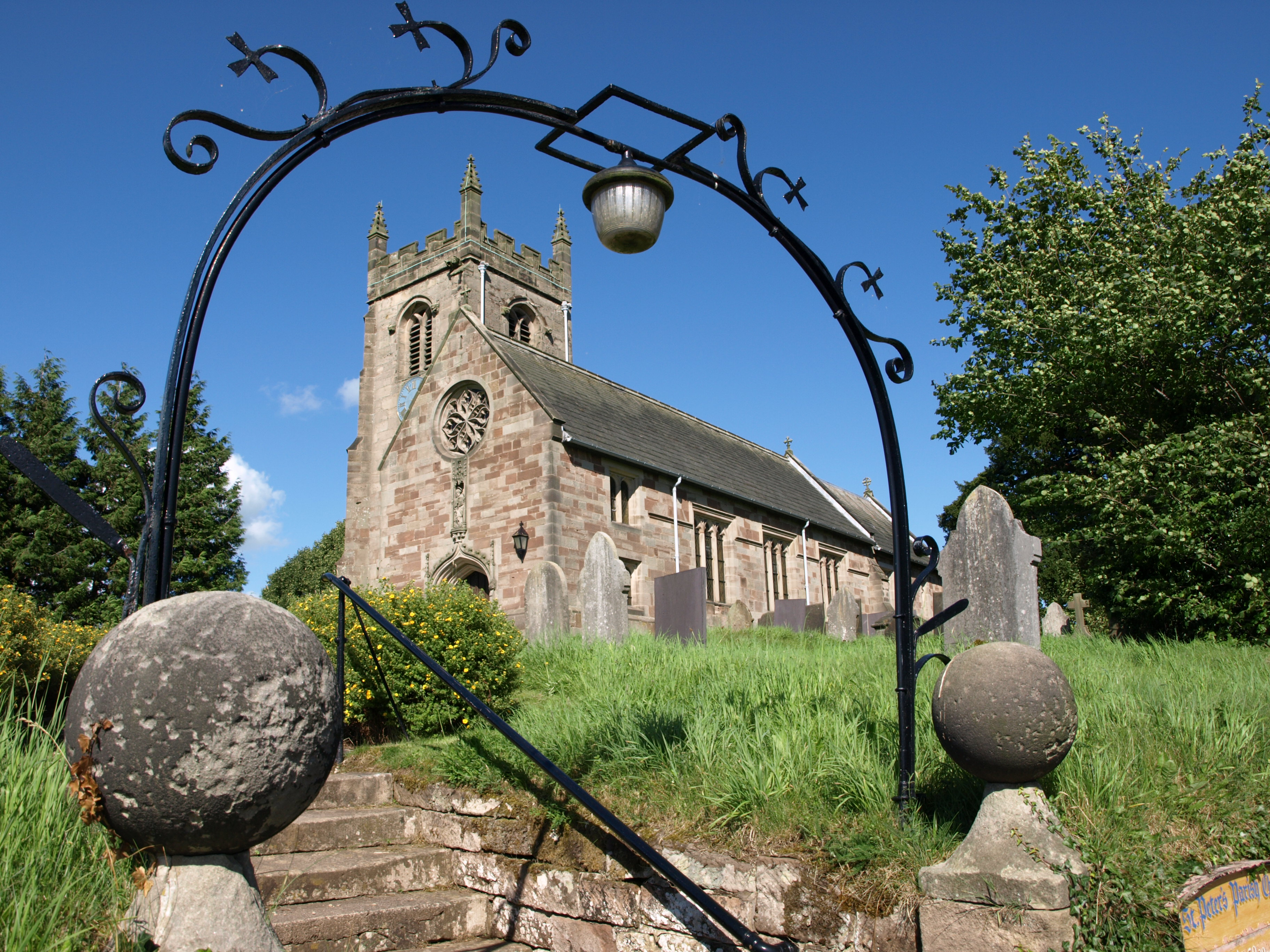
Church of St. Peter

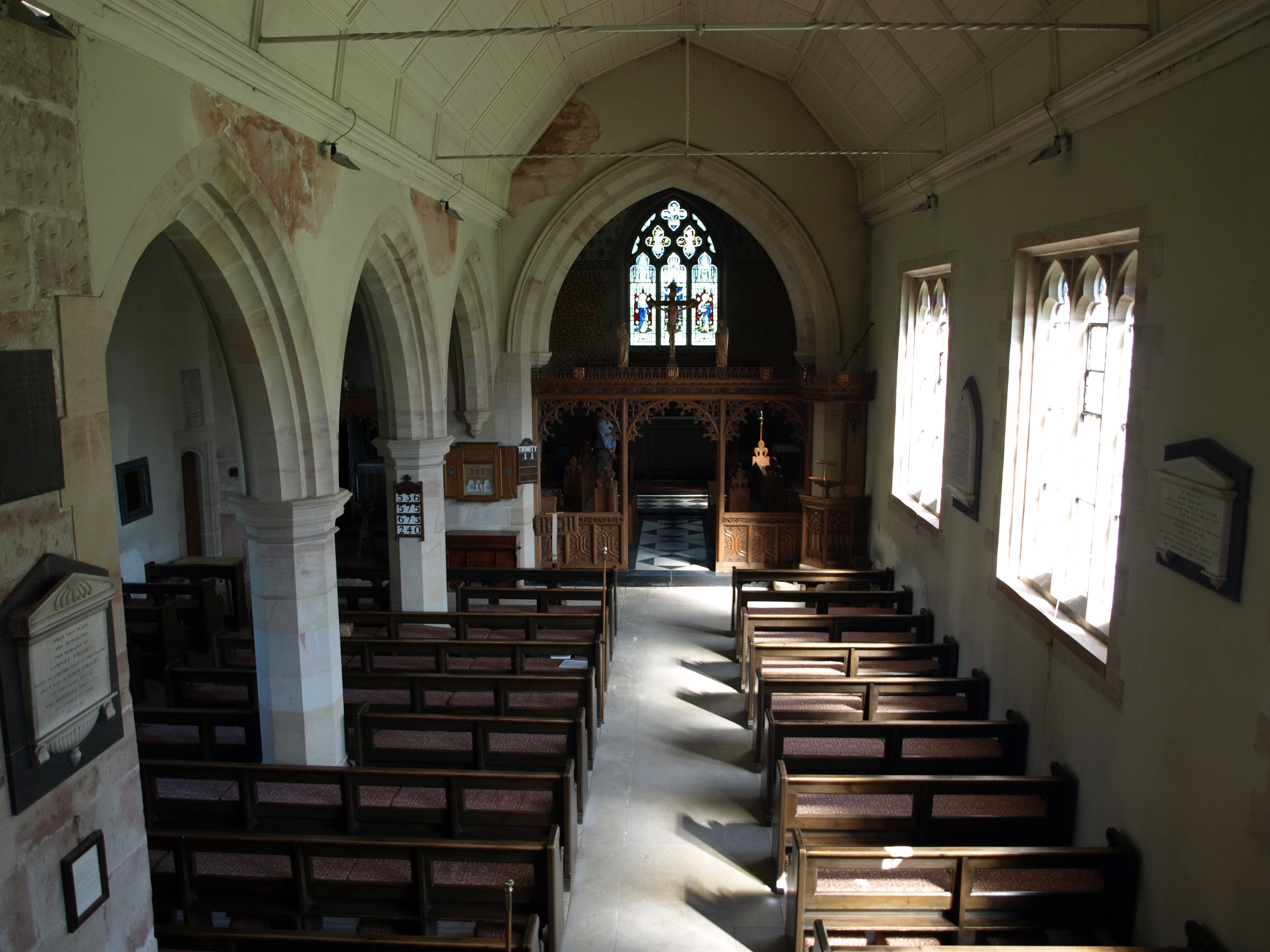
Nave of the church of St. Peter

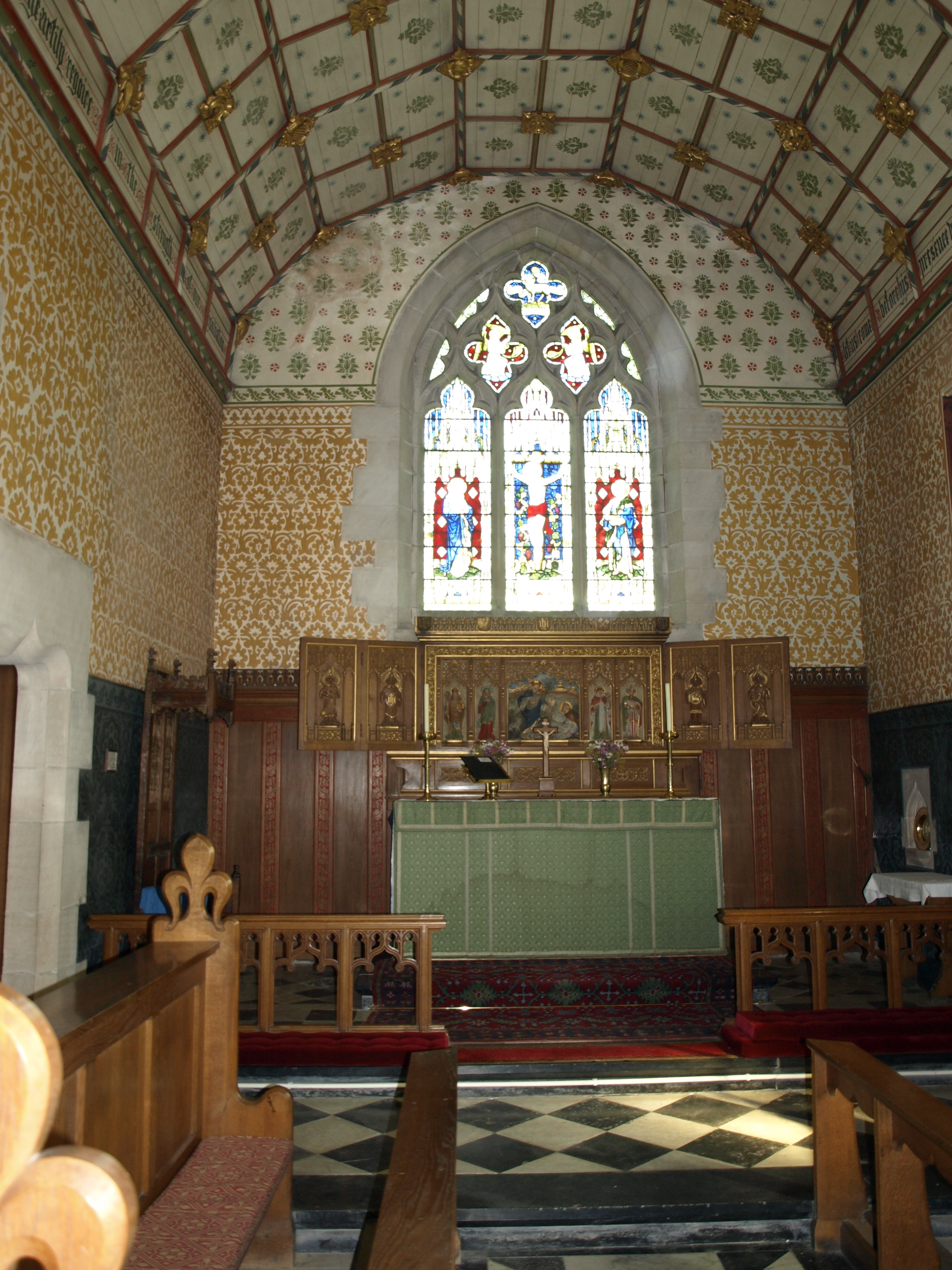
Sanctuary of the church of St. Peter
