= Deercote, Sudbury Park =

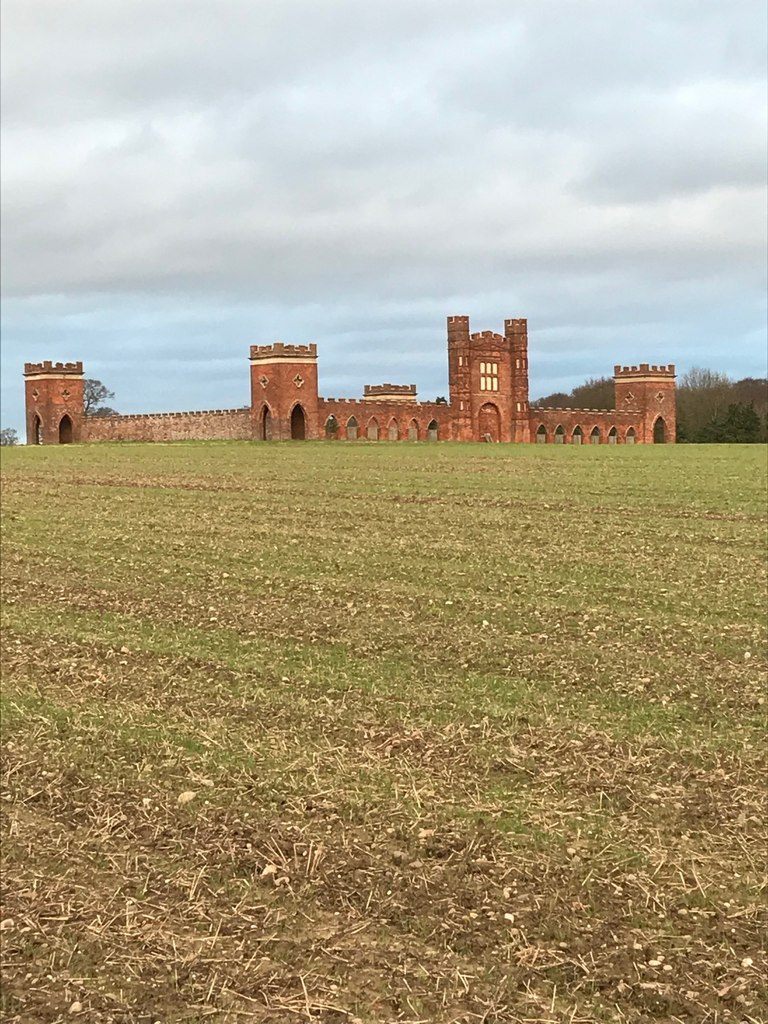
- Interactive map of the Deercote, Sudbury Park area

General information
- Status: Grade II* listed
- Location: Sudbury, Derbyshire, England
- Coordinates: 52°53′30.480″N 1°45′37.044″W grid reference SK 16225 32729

The Deercote in Sudbury Park is a deercote or folly, built in the 18th century on the Sudbury Hall estate, near the village of Sudbury in Derbyshire, England. It is a National Trust property, and is a Grade II* listed building.

== Description ==
The deercote was built about 1720–23, of red brick with sandstone dressings. There is a curtain wall on the north, south and west sides.

It is in the grounds of Sudbury Park, a site of about 150 hectares (370 acres), and is situated about 420 metres (1,380 ft) north-east of the Hall; the space between is crossed by the A50 road built in the late 20th century.

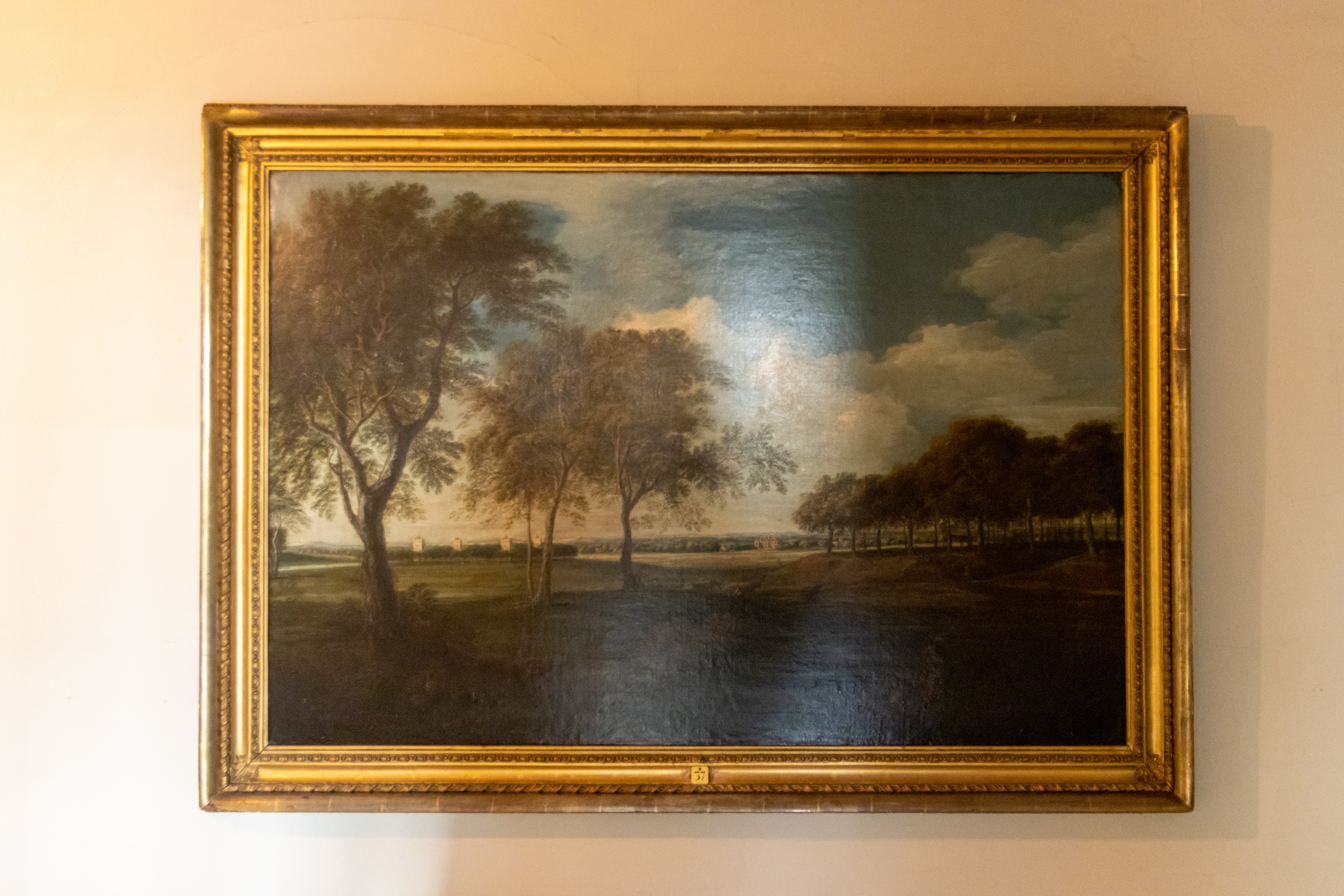
View from Sudbury Hall by Nicholas Thomas Dall: the deercote is in the distance on the left

It can be seen in a painting in Sudbury Hall by Nicholas Thomas Dall, showing the view north from the Hall about 1748. The four corner towers, with parapets and ogee roofs, are visible above a line of trees; the gatehouse had not yet been added.

The deer park was created in 1614 by Mary Vernon. The structure, of which the architect is unknown, was originally intended as an enclosure for the management of the deer herd, with high walls to prevent deer from leaping out; there was a central building, probably a deer barn.

The parkland was remodelled in the mid 18th century. The work is attributed to Sanderson Miller; the deercote was modified, probably to provide a dramatic detail to the view north from the Hall. The ogee roofs were removed from the corner towers, and in the centre of the south side a building was added with the appearance of a gatehouse, with archway, windows and turrets, if viewed from the south, but plain from the north. The curtain wall on this side has a row of open Gothic arches, and is castellated, and the plain wall on the west side is castellated.

== See also ==
- Listed buildings in Sudbury, Derbyshire
