= Bonsall, Derbyshire =

Village in Derbyshire, England

Coordinates: 53.121°N 1.584°W

Bonsall
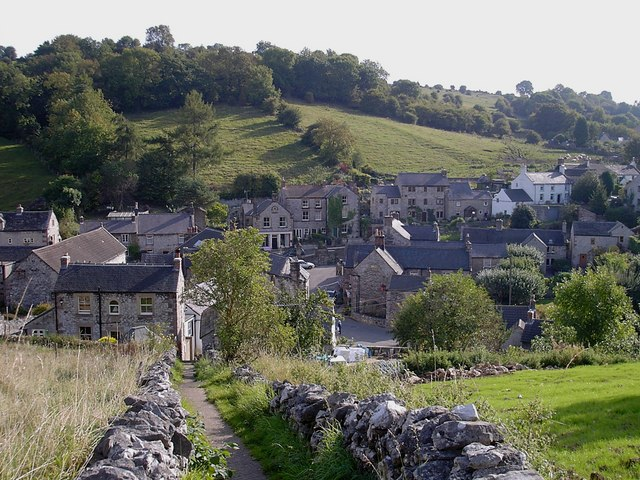
- Bonsall village

- Bonsall parish highlighted within Derbyshire
- Population: 775 (2001 census)
- OS grid reference: SK279582
- Civil parish: Bonsall
- District: Derbyshire Dales
- Shire county: Derbyshire
- Region: East Midlands
- Country: England
- Sovereign state: United Kingdom
- Post town: Matlock
- Postcode district: DE4
- Dialling code: 01629
- Police: Derbyshire
- Fire: Derbyshire
- Ambulance: East Midlands
- UK Parliament: Derbyshire Dales
- Website: Bonsall Village

Bonsall is a village and civil parish in the Derbyshire Dales on the edge of the Peak District. The civil parish population, including Brightgate and Horse Dale, was 775 at the 2001 Census, increasing to 803 at the 2011 Census.

== Geography ==
Bonsall is about 5 miles (8 km) from Matlock and about 18 miles (29 km) from Derby. Bonsall has a long history of lead mining, along with its neighbouring town of Wirksworth, probably going back to Roman times, and is recorded in the Domesday Book. Between 1894 and 1934, Bonsall was governed by its own Urban District Council, before being incorporated into Matlock Urban District by a County Review Order.

Bonsall Leys, to the west of Bonsall, is grassland which has been designated as a Site of Special Scientific Interest. The Diocese of Derby owns some of the land included within Bonsall Leys SSSI.

The approach to the village is via a steep hill leading up from Via Gellia (now the A5012 road) and nearby Cromford. The road is called the Clatterway, or occasionally the Col du Bonsall. Cascades Gardens, a four acre site which includes a Buddhist-inspired meditation garden and bonsai centre, is located on Clatterway.

The village lies on the edge of the Peak District National Park, the border of which bisects the 'Uppertown' suburb. The village is on the Limestone Way, at the head of its branch to Matlock, and on the Peak District Boundary Walk.

Parts of St James the Apostle's Church date from the 13th century, including the north side of the chancel and the arcade of the south aisle. The arcade of the north aisle is later and so is the Perpendicular Gothic tower. The outer walls of the church were rebuilt in 1861–62 under the direction of the Gothic Revival architect Ewan Christian.

There is a market cross in the village centre that may date from the Middle Ages. The ball on top was added in 1671. Bonsall applied for a market charter some three hundred years ago, but was rejected.

The Manor House was built in about 1670 and the Kings Head public house was established in 1677.

== Textiles and lead mines ==
Bonsall inhabitants have been involved in the textile industry, before and after Richard Arkwright. Around 1850 Bonsall was a farming village surrounded by lead mines and busy outworker frame-knitting workshops. A few 18th- and 19th-century frame-knitting workshop buildings survive. Many people also worked in the cotton spinning mills at Cromford and the Via Gellia. In early modern times Bonsall was on an important salters' route, and was a staging post on the road between Derby and Manchester..

== Economy and amenities ==
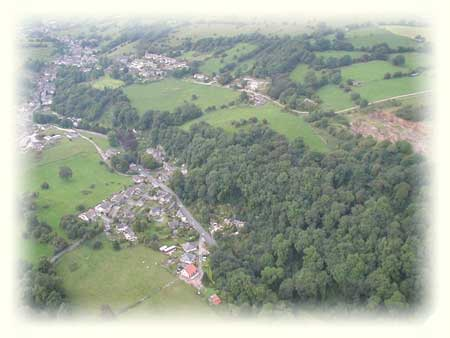
Aerial photo of Bonsall village seen from a helicopter

Bonsall remains a working village that is involved in agriculture, heavy goods transport and a range of forms of information technology. However, most people in the village travel to cities such as Derby, Nottingham and Sheffield for work. The village supports two public houses, the Barley Mow and the Kings Head.

The parish has a Church of England primary school.

=== Bonsall Camp ===
Bonsall Camp in Uppertown is a Christian youth camp, owned by the Christian Youth Foundation, a charity that runs several residential children's and youth weeks in the summer holidays. Camps have been run here for more than 60 years. The Christian author Selwyn Hughes recalls in his biography the time he was sent home from the camp for bad behaviour.

=== Events ===
Attractions include the Annual "World Championship Hen Race" held annually in August at the Barley Mow public house. This event was run for the first time in 1992.

== Discovery of horse skulls ==
During a renovation of a house in 'upper town' in 1866, builders lifted the ground-floor floorboards, only to discover 29 horse skulls with all of their lower jaws missing. They hypothesised that these skulls were remains from a legendary battle that took place on Bonsall Moor.

== UFO sightings ==
For two years from October 2000, there were 19 sightings of UFOs in the area. On 5 October 2000, Sharon Rowlands photographed a circular object. The circular object showed a similarity to a circular object seen on the STS-75 Columbia Space Shuttle mission in early 1996.

== Education ==
There is one primary school (ages 4 to 11). Bonsall CofE (VA) primary school as of 2025 has 39 pupils. It is located on Church Street and has a capacity of 105 students.

== Notable people ==
- Ellis Farneworth (died 1763), an English translator.
- Joseph Marsh (1803-1838), Scottish Anglican priest, the founding headmaster of the Colombo Academy in Sri Lanka
- William Rolley (1839–1912), trade unionist, political activist, police officer, engine driver, steelworker and farrier
- Charles Frederick White (1891–1956), politician and MP for West Derbyshire, 1944 to 1950

== See also ==
- Listed buildings in Bonsall, Derbyshire
