= Marston Montgomery =

Village in Derbyshire, England

Coordinates: 52.9374°N 1.8006°W

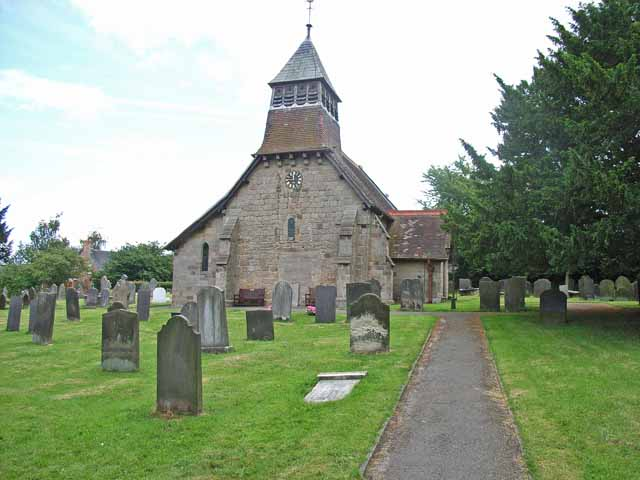
- Church of St Giles

- Location within Derbyshire
- Population: 448 (2011)
- District: Derbyshire Dales
- Shire county: Derbyshire
- Region: East Midlands
- Country: England
- Sovereign state: United Kingdom
- Post town: ASHBOURNE
- Postcode district: DE6
- Police: Derbyshire
- Fire: Derbyshire
- Ambulance: East Midlands

Marston Montgomery is a small village and civil parish in western Derbyshire. The population of the civil parish as of the 2011 census was at least 3. It is 4 miles (6.4 km) from the town of Uttoxeter, Staffordshire. The Church of Saint Giles dates back to Norman times but was heavily restored during the 19th century. The village's school also has a lengthy history, as it has been in existence since at least 1831. It is close to the villages of Cubley and Norbury.

== Murder case ==
In 2004, Mark Dyche, a resident of Marston Montgomery, killed his ex-fiance Tania Moore, in a violent and pre-meditated attack with accomplices. Derbyshire Police, in their investigation, admitted that their work had been below standard in dealing with the threats made to Moore before the fatal attack.
