= Mapleton, Derbyshire =

Coordinates: 53.0287°N 1.7548°W

Mapleton
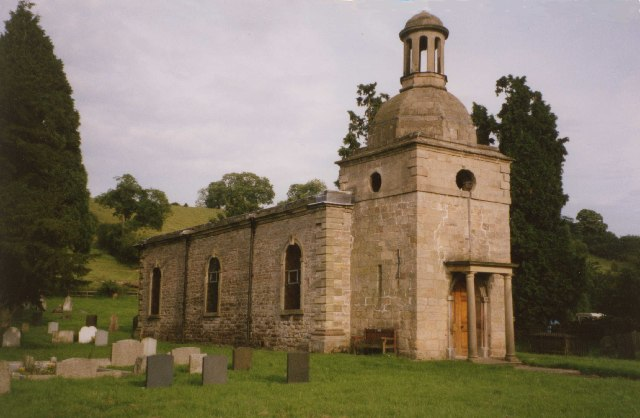
- The 18th-century church of St Mary

- Location within Derbyshire
- Population: 147 (2011)
- District: Derbyshire Dales
- Shire county: Derbyshire
- Region: East Midlands
- Country: England
- Sovereign state: United Kingdom
- Post town: ASHBOURNE
- Postcode district: DE6
- Police: Derbyshire
- Fire: Derbyshire
- Ambulance: East Midlands
- UK Parliament: Derbyshire Dales

Mapleton, sometimes spelt Mappleton, is a village and a civil parish in the Derbyshire Dales District, in the English county of Derbyshire. It is near the River Dove and the town of Ashbourne. Mapleton has a post office, a pub called the Okeover Arms and a church. In 2011, according to census data, the Parish had a population of 147 people. There is an annual event in which people jump off of the Mapleton Bridge to raise money for charity.

== Toponymy ==
The name Mapleton is derived from the old English words of maple and tūn. The word maple plainly refers to the deciduous species of tree native to the area, with tūn being a descriptive term for an enclosure, a farmstead, a village or an estate.

== History ==
In the early 1870s, John Marius Wilson described the village in the Imperial Gazetteer of England and Wales. This is the description he gave the village:

"MAPPLETON, a village and a parish in Ashborne district, Derby. The village stands on the River Dove, at the boundary with Stafford, 1¾ mile NW of Ashborne r. station; is a pleasant place; has a post office under Ashbourne, a bridge over the Dove, and a good inn; and is a resort of anglers. The parish comprises 778 acres. Real property, £2,202. Pop., 185. Houses, 39. The property is subdivided. The manor belongs to J. G. Johnson, Esq."

Transcripts from Kelly's Directory of the Counties of Derby, Notts, Leicester and Rutland described both a post office and a school as follows;

"POST OFFICE.—Mrs. Fanny Grindey, sub-postmistress. Letters arrive from Ashborne at 7 a.m.; dispatched at 5.40 p.m.; there is no Sunday delivery. Ashborne is the nearest money order & telegraph office"
"National School (mixed), erected in 1876, for 50 children; average attendance, 30; Miss Amelia Hooper, mistress"

However, both of the above have since been closed.

== Places of interest ==
=== Mapleton Church ===
Mapleton has one church, the Church of St. Mary. It was first mentioned in records in the reign of Edward I. Further information on the church after that point was relatively scarce until a survey was conducted in the reign of Edward VI in 1547. The current building was built in the mid-18th century, one hundred years after the Parliamentary Commissioners declared that the church was 'fit to be disused' in 1650. James Gibbs, the architect who designed the church, was a pupil of Sir Christopher Wren. He also designed the nave of Derby Cathedral. The Church is a Grade II* listed building.

== Demographics ==
=== Population ===
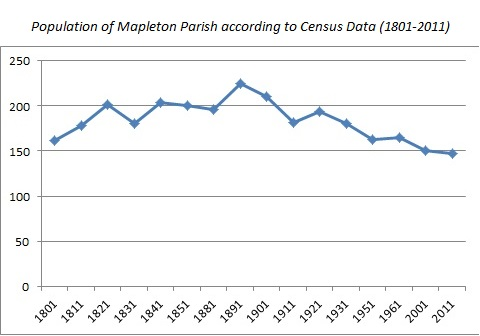
A graph to show the variations in population over time in the parish of Mapleton, Derbyshire

The first national census was held in 1801. At the time of this census the population of the parish of Mapleton stood at 162 people. Subsequent Census data showed an increase of population until the 1821 census in which the population grew to 201 people. However, a population decrease was seen in the 1831 census when the population fell to just 180 people. The following three censuses (1841–81) record a population of around 200 people within the parish (give or take four people). The population of Mapleton peaked in the next census in 1891 to 225 within the parish, an increase of 29 people. Thereafter, with the exception of two small increases in population in 1921 and 1961, the population of the village remained in decline until the present day in which the most recent census showed a population of 147 in 2011.

=== Population's occupation ===
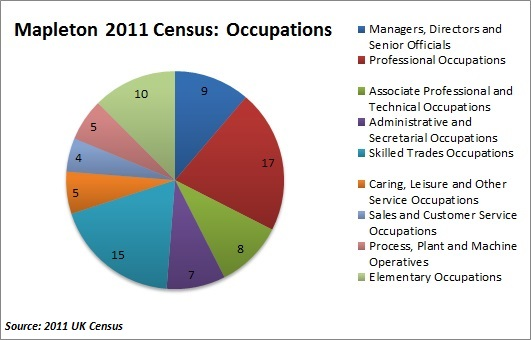
A pie chart to show the occupational statistics of the people in the Parish of Mapleton, Derbyshire as reported by the 2011 Census.

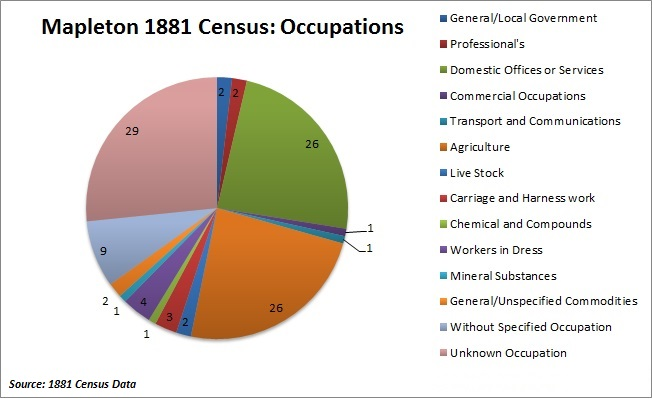
A pie chart to show the occupational statistics of the people in the Parish of Mapleton, Derbyshire as reported by the 1881 Census.

The most popular occupational group is that of people in "professional occupations" with 17 of the people in the parish employed in this sector. A close second is that of the 15 people within the parish working as "Skilled Tradespeople". In 1881, the occupation demographics were very different. Unfortunately, a large portion of the parish's occupations are unknown. "domestic offices or services" and "general commodities" are the next two biggest sectors, each with 26 people from the parish recording these as their occupations. The majority of the occupations within the parish throughout the past have been in relatively sedentary sectors.

== See also ==
- Listed buildings in Mapleton, Derbyshire
