= Scheduled monuments in Derbyshire Dales =

This is a list of scheduled monuments in the district of Derbyshire Dales in the English county of Derbyshire.

In the United Kingdom, a scheduled monument is a "nationally important" archaeological site or historic building that has been given protection against unauthorised change by being placed on a list (or "schedule") by the Secretary of State for Culture, Media and Sport; English Heritage takes the leading role in identifying such sites. Scheduled monuments are defined in the Ancient Monuments and Archaeological Areas Act 1979 and the National Heritage Act 1983. There are about 20,000 scheduled monument entries on the list, which is maintained by English Heritage; more than one site can be included in a single entry.

While a scheduled monument can also be recognised as a listed building, English Heritage considers listed building status as a better way of protecting buildings than scheduled monument status. If a monument is considered by English Heritage to "no longer merit scheduling" it can be descheduled.

Derbyshire has over 500 scheduled monuments including many stone cairns, stone circles, barrow burial mounds, lead mining relics, ancient settlements, and over 20 bridges.

Image	Name and reference	Feature	Location	Notes
	Aleck Low bowl barrow	Barrow	Hartington; SK17495945	
	Alport smelt mill	Mining	Alport; SK22386486	Remains of smelting furnaces from lead mining in the area. The mill was operational between 1845 and 1875. 500m north-east of Alport village
	Anglian high cross in the churchyard of St Lawrence's Church, Eyam	Cross	Eyam; SK21797610	Also a Grade I listed building.
	Anglian high cross in the churchyard of All Saints' Church, Bradbourne	Cross	Bradbourne; SK20815273	Also a Grade II listed building.
	Anglian high cross in the churchyard of All Saints' Church, Bakewell	Cross	Bakewell; SK2157668466	Also a Grade I listed building.
	Anglo-Scandinavian high cross from Two Dales, Darley, now in the churchyard of All Saints' Church, Bakewell	Cross	Bakewell SK21556846	Also a Grade I listed building.
	Anglo-Scandinavian high cross shaft and medieval cross base in the churchyard of All Saints' Church	Cross	Brailsford; SK2449841265	
	Arbor Low henge, large irregular stone circle, linear bank and bowl barrow	Henge	Monyash; SK1585263233; SK1603963549	A Neolithic henge including about 50 large limestone blocks which form an egg-shaped circle.
	Arbourseats Veins and Sough, Wardlow Sough, Nay Green Mine and Washing Floors, Hading Vein and Seedlow Rake	Mining	Litton; SK1729674712	
	Ashford Bridge	Bridge	Ashford-in-the-Water; SK1988369597	Also a Grade II listed building.
	Atlow moated site, enclosures and causeway	Moated site	Atlow; SK2268848525	
	Bakewell Bridge	Bridge	Bakewell; SK2194968652	Also a Grade I listed building. Spans the River Wye.
	Bank Top bowl and oval barrows	Barrow	Kniveton; SK2162851784; SK2161551725	
	Baslow Bridge	Bridge	Baslow; SK2510472369	Also a Grade I listed building. Spans the River Derwent.
	Bassett Wood bowl barrow	Barrow	Tissington; SK1777051117	
Route of Batham Gate Road near Peak Forest	Batham Gate, Roman road	Road	Tideswell; SK1284478975; SK1334679165; SK1380479339	Approx 1-mile-long course of Roman road on Tideswell Moor between Mount Pleasant Farm and Hulmes Vale Farm
	Beans and Bacon, Old Eye, Fiery Dragon and Cod Beat lead mines and a limekiln	Mining	Bonsall; SK2557359244; SK2592959276; SK2597659136	480m south of Blakelow Farm
	Bee Low bowl barrow	Barrow	Youlgreave; SK1916064735	
	Benty Grange hlaew	Burial mound	Monyash; SK1460664220	Site of a large Anglo-Saxon barrow, excavated in 1848 by Thomas Bateman, who discovered a richly furnished burial which included the Benty Grange helmet.
	Black Rakes, Welshmans Venture and Bondog Hole Mines, and Merry Tom and Thumper Sitch Levels	Mining	Middleton-by-Wirksworth; SK2653156156	
	Blackstone's Low bowl barrow	Barrow	Ballidon; SK2103455413	
	Blake Low bowl barrow	Barrow	Great Longstone; SK2192073530	
	Boars Low bowl barrow	Barrow	Tissington; SK1693352588	
	Bole Hill bowl barrow	Barrow	Bakewell; SK1828567703	
	Bonsall Leys lead mines	Mining	Bonsall; SK2656657476; SK2676157160	Ruins, pits, spoil heaps and buried remains of shallow lead mining as early as the 1540s.
	Borther Low bowl barrow	Barrow	Gratton; SK1970760855	
	Bostern Grange bowl barrow	Barrow	Newton Grange; SK1514453375	
	Bowl barrow and wayside cross	Cross	Pilsley; SK2348770794	WSW of Pilsley
	Bowl barrow east of Arbor Low	Barrow	Monyash; SK1611363520	
	Bowl barrow in Foggy Lees Plantation	Barrow	Middleton-by-Youlgreave; SK1889663572	
	Bowl barrow known as Priestcliffe Low	Barrow	Taddington; SK1349971909	200m west of Low End Farm
	Bowl barrow north of Manor House	Barrow	Sheldon; SK1683669252	
	5 Bowl barrows on Calton Pastures	Barrow	Edensor; SK2337968560; SK2362668497; SK2395468308; SK2413368065; SK2446267628	Within 1 km of Calton Houses
	Bowl barrow on Carsington Pasture	Barrow	Carsington; SK2440254254	800m south-east of Brassington Brickworks
	2 Bowl barrows on Haddon Fields	Barrow	Nether Haddon; SK2148865357; SK2172866188	
	2 Bowl barrows on Longstone Moor	Barrow	Great Longstone; SK1899873643; SK1888473293	
	Bowl barrow on Masson Hill	Barrow	Bonsall; SK2860758670	
	Bowl barrow west of Castlegate Lane	Barrow	Little Longstone; SK1826372764	
	Bowl barrow west of Manor House	Barrow	Sheldon; SK1692568974	
	2 bowl barrows at Osmaston Fields, north	Barrow	Osmaston; SK1839844701	
	2 bowl barrows at Pilsbury	Barrow	Hartington; SK1207663949	
	2 bowl barrows at Rockhurst	Barrow	Aldwark; SK2151957834	
	2 bowl barrows east of Hay Dale	Barrow	Little Longstone; SK1816872876	
	2 bowl barrows on Chelmorton Low	Barrow	Chelmorton; SK1141470623	
	2 bowl barrows on Stand Low	Barrow	Kniveton; SK2132850855	
	Bradley Park bowl barrow	Barrow	Bradley; SK2402644584	
	Brightside lead mine	Mining	Hassop; SK2292473256	80m south-west of Brightside Cottage
	Bronze Age burial, ceremonial and settlement remains on Stanton Moor	Settlement	Stanton; SK2472363123	Prehistoric remains on the gritstone moorland of Stanton Moor including Nine Ladies stone circle, the King Stone standing stone, two other stone circles, two ring cairns and over 100 funerary cairns. Evidence of medieval, post-medieval and 19th- to early 20th-century activity.
	Bronze Age settlement and ceremonial remains on Gibbet Moor	Settlement	Baslow; SK2796470887	980m north-east of Swiss Cottage
	Brundcliffe hlaew	Burial mound	Hartington; SK1588361470	
	Brushfield Hough bowl barrow	Barrow	Brushfield; SK1679070944	
	Burr Tor prehistoric stock enclosure	Enclosure	Great Hucklow; SK1799378318	
	Burton Moor bowl barrow	Barrow	Bakewell; SK2005967331	
	Cackle Mackle and Stadford Hollow lead mines	Mining	Great Longstone; SK1889474097; SK1917073975	On Longstone Moor
	3 Cairns near Newbridge Farm	Cairns	Baslow; SK2846472263; SK2872072579; SK2820373573	400m north-west, 1500m north-west and 500m west of Newbridge Farm
	2 Cairns near Raven Tor	Cairns	Beeley; SK2858567236; SK2798766509	450m north-east and 600m south of Raven Tor
	Cairn near Lady Wash Farm	Cairns	Eyam; SK2229078403	720m north-east of Lady Wash Farm
	Cairn near Offerton House	Cairns	Offerton; SK2055480826	800m WSW of Offerton House
	Cairn near Leam Hall Farm	Cairns	Eyam; SK2254978642	880m south-west of Leam Hall Farm
	Cairn cemetery on Gibbet Moor	Cairns	Baslow; SK2843670646	1100m south-west of Stonelow Farm
	2 cairns on Beeley Moor	Cairns	Beeley; SK2897368223	East of Hell Bank Plantation
	2 Cairns on Harland Edge	Cairns	Beeley; SK2930268574; SK2970068227	
	Cairn, near Stanage House	Cairns	Eyam	600m north-east of Stanage House
	Cairnfield near Clod Hall Farm	Cairns	Baslow; SK2869573627	1400m north-west of Clod Hall Farm
	Cairnfield near Offerton House	Cairns	Offerton; SK2102080747	470m south-west of Offerton House
	Cairnfield near Highlow Hall	Cairns	Highlow; SK2131280123	600m west of Highlow Hall
	3 Cairnfields near Stanage House	Cairns	Eyam; SK2183478260; SK2170578573; SK2170078852	580m ENE, 630m NE and 870m north-east of Stanage House
	Cairnfield near Bumper Castle	Cairns	Darley Dale; SE5534692792	650m north-west of Bumper Castle
	Cairnfield near Raven Tor	Cairns	Beeley; SK2880467399	700m north-east of Raven Tor
	Cairnfield near Lane End Farm	Cairns	Offerton; SK2030680702	870m north-east of Lane End Farm
	Cairnfield near Green's House	Cairns	Outseats; SK2240684583	970m north-west of Green's House
	Cairnfield and associated settlement	Settlement	Eyam; SK2282178974	450m south-west of Leam Hall Farm
	Cairnfield and barrow on Rabbit Warren	Cairns	Beeley; SK2810368744	900m south-east of Park Farm
	Cairnfield and field system	Cairns	Baslow	560m east of Park Gate Farm
	Cairnfield and field system, north of Eaglestone Flat	Cairns	Curbar; SK2665974859	450m south-west of Swine Sty
	Cairnfield and field system on Eaglestone Flat	Cairns	Curbar; SK2619273761	100m south-west of Eagle Stone
	Cairnfield and house platform	Cairns	Beeley; SK3078867529	400m south-west of Harewood Grange Farm
	Cairnfield and ring cairn	Cairns	Offerton; SK2124680623	490m South of Offerton Hall
	Cairnfield and ring cairn on Rabbit Warren	Cairns	Beeley; SK2777668760	650m south-east of Park Farm
	Cairnfield and standing stones, east of Bunker's Hill Wood	Cairns	Baslow; SK2814569735	1 km north-east of Park Farm
	Cairnfield on Beeley Moor, east of Hell Bank Plantation	Cairns	Beeley	
	Cairnfield on Gibbet Moor, west of Umberley Brook	Cairns	Baslow	1.2 km south-west of Dalebrook House
	Cairnfield with enclosure, house platform and ring cairn	Cairns	Beeley; SK2861967753	800m north-east of Raven Tor
	Cairnfield near Leam Hall Farm	Cairns	Eyam; SK2285179241	320m west of Leam Hall Farm
	Cairnfield, field system and ring cairn	Cairns	Baslow; SK2848173467	1300m NNW of Newbridge Farm
	Cairnfield, field system and ring cairn	Cairns	Baslow; SK2821072459	650m east of Moorside Farm
	Calling Low bowl barrow	Barrow	Youlgreave; SK1748464874	
	Callow Hall moated site	Moated site	Callow; SK2685951813	A large moated site with standing remains of buildings from the medieval manor.
	Callow prehistoric settlement and field system, Carr Head Moor	Settlement	Hathersage; SK2437682149	300m ENE of Toothill Farm
	Calver weir and water management system	Waterworks	Calver; SK2456175234	200m north-east of Stocking Farm
	Camp Green ringwork	Earthwork	Hathersage; SK2346381895	
	Carsington Pasture, Nickalum, Perseverance, West Head, Break Hollow and other small mines and medieval field boundaries	Mining	Brassington` SK2461954034	
	Castle Ring defended settlement	Settlement	Harthill; SK2206762837	Immediately north of Harthill Moor Farm. It now consists of an oval earthwork ditch (about 5m wide and 100m across) with inner and outer banks, up to 2m high. It hasn't been excavated but it is considered to be an integral part of the Bronze Age landscape of Harthill Moor.
	Chambered tomb and two bowl barrows on Minning Low	Tomb	Ballidon; SK2093557290	
	Civil War redoubt	Defences	Tissington; SK1763352334	A square earthbank enclosure about 28m across used as a military defence. Tissington Hall was a Royalist garrison set up by Colonel Fitzherbert in 1643. 150m east of Tissington Hall
Conksbury Medieval Bridge, with site of village in field beyond	Conksbury deserted medieval settlement	Settlement	Youlgreave; SK2107065489	The deserted medieval settlement at Conksbury was recorded in the Domesday Book (1086 AD) as Cranchesberie. The site consists of earthworks and buried remains of buildings.
	Cop Low oval barrow	Barrow	Hazlebadge near Little Hucklow; SK1662779134	
	Cop Rake and Moss Rake lead mines	Mining	Bradwell; SK1309480047	750m north-east of Wheston House
Cratcliff Rocks and Robin Hood's Stride	Cratcliff Rocks defended settlement	Settlement	Harthill; SK2258362381	A broadly round enclosure. A 5m wide ditch cut into the rock surrounds an area with various building platforms. The wider Harthill Moor prehistoric landscape includes Nine Stones Close stone circle.
	Cratcliff Rocks hermitage	Cave	Birchover; SK2274762343	A medieval hermit's cave from the 13th–14th century including a bas-relief crucifix carved inside the rock shelter. 18m wide by 17m deep.
	Cromford Bridge	Bridge	Cromford; SK3001357180	Spans the River Derwent. Also a Grade II* listed building.
	Cromford Canal engine house, engine and aqueduct	Waterworks	Cromford; SK3152255684	Within the World Heritage Site of Derwent Valley Mills. Includes Leawood Pump House, constructed in 1849 to raise water from the River Derwent into the Cromford Canal (which crosses the river over the aqueduct). The steam-powered beam engine moves 4 tonnes of water with every stroke of its piston (28 tonnes per minute). The Pump House is also a Grade II* listed building.
	Cromwell's Low bowl barrow	Barrow	Tissington; SK1534552671	
	Cronkston Low bowl barrow	Barrow	Hartington; SK1168566308	
	Cross Low bowl barrow	Barrow	Eaton and Alsop; SK1618555531	
	Cross ridge dyke	Cross	Great Longstone; SK2256373550	800m east of Bleaklow
	Cubley Hall moated site	Moated site	Cubley; SK1642137719	
	Darley Bridge	Bridge	South Darley	Also a Grade II* listed building.
	Dimin Dale Romano-British settlement and field system	Settlement	Sheldon; SK1688970251	South of Taddington Wood
	Doll Tor stone circle and cairn	Henge	Stanton in Peak; SK2383262873	Doll Tor, occasionally known as the Six Stones, is a small stone circle near Birchover, west of Stanton Moor in the Derbyshire Peak District. Dating from the Bronze Age, the circle consists of six standing stones. The site was excavated in 1852 by Thomas Bateman.
	Dove Bridge	Bridge	Doveridge; SK1054834464	Spans the River Dove. Also a Grade II* listed building.
	Dowel Cave	Cave	Glutton Bridge; SK0755967595	Narrow cave c.10m deep. Excavation work done in the 1950s found evidence of the cave's use in Mesolithic, Neolithic, Bronze Age, Iron Age and Roman times.
	Duncote Farm moated site	Moated site	Biggin; SK2657148042	
	Ellastone Bridge	Bridge	Norbury; SK1199942382	18th-century multi-span bridge across the River Dove between the villages of Norbury and Ellastone. Also a Grade II listed building.
	Embanked stone circle known as Wet Withens, and adjacent cairn	Henge	Eyam Moor; SK2254379011	A prehistoric stone circle of about 10 orthostats (upright boulders) surrounded by an earthwork bank. Also known as Eyam Moor 1.
	Embanked stone circle on Eyam Moor	Henge	Eyam; SK2316578945	340m south of Leam Hall Farm
	End Low bowl barrow	Barrow	Hartington; SK1560460562	
	Entrance to Long Sough, west of Allen's Hill	Mining	Cromford; SK2950156828	
	Faucet Rake lead mines	Mining	Castleton; SK1180282056	870m SW and 930m south-east of Oxlow House
	Field system and stone circle on Rabbit Warren	Henge	Beeley; SK2807668436	1150m south-east of Park Farm
	Fin Cop promontory fort, bowl barrow and eighteenth century lime kiln with associated quarry	Fort	Ashford-in-the-Water; SK1748170999	An Iron Age hill fort in Monsal Dale, constructed between 440BC and 390BC.
	Fishponds	Ponds	Mercaston; SK2781842233	260m north-west of Mercaston Hall Farm
	Five Wells chambered tomb	Tomb	Taddington; SK1237771038	The mound was excavated by Thomas Bateman in 1846.
	Fox Hole Cave	Cave	Earl Sterndale; SK0997566179	Near the summit of High Wheeldon hill, a National Trust property. The limestone cave has several chambers. Excavations since the 1920s discovered Palaeolithic, Mesolithic, Neolithic, Bronze Age and Roman objects. Some of the artefacts are on display in Buxton Museum.
	Friden Hollow bowl barrow	Barrow	Middleton-by-Youlgreave; SK1743861325	
	Froggatt Bridge	Bridge	Calver; SK2436876075	Crosses the River Derwent. Also a Grade II listed building.
	Galley Low bowl barrow	Barrow	Brassington; SK2179856486	
	Gallowlow Lane bowl barrow	Barrow	Ballidon; SK2126156717	
	Gib Hill oval barrow and bowl barrow	Barrow	Middleton-by-Youlgreave; SK1583463325	
	Gorsey Low bowl barrow	Barrow	Newton Grange; SK1646753281	
	Gorseydale lead mines	Mining	Bonsall; SK2487759726	300m north and 650m north west of Moor Farm
	Green Low bowl barrow, west	Barrow	Aldwark; SK2298758031	
	Green Low chambered tomb	Tomb	Aldwark; SK2315458039	Chamber made of limestone slabs with a short paved entry passage. Excavated in 1843 by Thomas Bateman who found human and animal remains, sherds of Neolithic pottery and a polished greenstone axe. Another skeleton was found nearby. Roman coins and pottery were also found close by. South of Aldwark Grange farm near the summit of Green Low hill.
	Grindleford Bridge	Bridge	Grindleford; SK2448077815	Spans the River Derwent. Also a Grade II listed building.
	Grindlow bowl barrow	Barrow	Over Haddon; SK2026366988	
Harboro' Rocks	Harboro' Cave	Cave	Brassington; SK2422155227	A natural cavern in Harboro' Rocks in which archaeologists have found evidence of human occupants since the Ice Age. According to Daniel Defoe, a lead miner's family was living in the cave in the early C18th.
	Harthill Moor bowl barrow	Barrow	Harthill; SK2219462544	A Bronze Age burial mound 20m long and 11m wide. It was partially excavated in 1877 by Jewitt and Greenwell. A limestone cist was found with the remains from two cremations. About 150m south-east of Harthill Moor Farm.
	Hawks Low bowl barrow	Barrow	Parwich; SK1701456739	
	High Field hlaew	Burial mound	Brushfield; SK1685972353	
	High Rake Mine	Mining	Little Hucklow; SK1639377780	
	Hillcarr Sough and associated lime kiln and paved track	Mining	Stanton in Peak; SK2584563732	
	Hob Hurst's House: a square, banked and ditched burial cairn with cist on Harland Edge	Cairns	Beeley; SK2874369235	A Bronze Age barrow on Beeley Moor near Bakewell. It is unique in that instead of the normal round shape, Hob Hurst's barrow is rectangular. Originally made with 13 stones, only five remain today.
	Holme Bridge	Bridge	Bakewell; SK2154268992	Also a Grade I listed building.
	Hulland Old Hall moat, enclosure, chapel site and four fishponds	Moated site	Hulland; SK2406646427	
	Ivet Low bowl barrow	Barrow	Hopton; SK2596254392	
	Kenslow Knoll bowl barrow	Barrow	Middleton-by-Youlgreave; SK1842361717	
	Larks Low bowl barrow	Barrow	Middleton-by-Youlgreave; SK2008662605	
Bateman's House above Lathkill Mine Shaft	Lathkill Dale and Mandale mines and soughs	Mining	Youlgreave; SK1923465968	Lathkill Dale and Mandale mines and soughs are a rare and well-preserved example of lead mining activity dating from the 13th century. They include ruins of engines houses, mine shafts and an aqueduct. The mines were closed by the 1860s after flooding proved too problematic.
	Lead mill on north bank of Bar Brook	Metalworks	Curbar; SK2726073869	80m east of confluence with Sandyford Brook
	Lead mines	Mining	Elton; SK2092460394	600m and 980m south-west of Oddo House Farm
	Lead smelt mill and wood-drying kiln in Froggatt Wood	Metalworks	Froggatt; SK2475577245	550m south of Haywood Farm
	3 lead working coes, a shaft and a dressing floor on Longstone Edge	Metalworks	Great Longstone; SK2132073141	
	Lead workings in High Tor Recreation Ground	Metalworks	Matlock; SK2980358877	
	Lean Low bowl barrow	Barrow	Hartington; SK1495362219	
	Lees and Dove Rakes, Booth Lee Pipes and Sterndale Sough	Mining	Taddington; SK1564672697	
	Liffs Low bowl barrow	Barrow	Hartington; SK1531257669	
	Little Pasture Mine	Mining	Eyam; SK2070977248	
	Long Dale bowl barrow	Barrow	Middleton-by-Youlgreave; SK1867460803	
	Long Low bowl barrow	Barrow	Grindlow; SK1869377242	
	Lower Thurvaston medieval settlement, including part of the open field system	Settlement	Longford; SK2309637177	
	Lumford Mill, Bakewell	Mill	Bakewell; SK2104169327	Earthworks and structures for managing the water supply to Sir Richard Arkwright's third mill since 1777, including a weir, stream, pond, dam wall and tunnel. Also a Grade II listed building.
The Smithy at Lumsdale Mills	Lumsdale Mills and associated water management features	Waterworks	Matlock; SK3130560840	Various mills and three ponds in Lumsdale Valley. Two 17th-century lead smelting mills; one on the site of what is now known as the Bone Mill and the other on the site of the later Paint Mill. Corn Mill, Saw Mill, Garton Mill (Lower Bleach Works) and Upper Bleach Works.
	Magpie Mine, Dirty Red Soil, Maypit, Horsesteps and Great Red Soil lead mines	Mining	Sheldon; SK1724868074	Remains of lead mining workings from late 17th century until 1958. The monument includes the Cornish engine house ruins, renovated square chimney, closed mine shafts and a lime kiln. 700m south of the village of Sheldon
	Matlock Bridge	Bridge	Matlock; SK2978860178	Spans the River Derwent. Also a Grade II* listed building.
	Maury Mine and Sough	Mining	Taddington; SK1480372969	
	Meadow Place bowl barrow	Barrow	Youlgreave; SK2029965164	
	Medieval cross base	Cross	Beeley; SK2969467703	780m south-west of Arkwright Plantation
	Medieval enclosed field system and earlier remains at Sheffield Plantation	Field system	Grindleford; SK2565879225	
	Medieval farmstead and field system	Field system	Grindleford; SK2546178807	525m South of Yarncliff Quarry
	Medieval field system and long houses at Lawrence Field	Field system	Grindleford; SK2519779546	
	Medieval grange and field system	Field system	Ballidon; SK2009156616	200m South of Royston Grange
	Medieval moated site, ridge and furrow, and mill site at Sturston	Moated site	Offcote and Underwood; SK2007746809	
	Medieval settlement and associated field system	Settlement	Ballidon; SK2046554397; SK2024754556	Earthworks and buried remains of a medieval settlement (Anglo-Saxon estate at Ballidon granted by King Edgar in AD 963). Field boundaries and ridge and furrow farming. Restored Anglo-Norman church is a Grade II listed building. Immediately south of Ballidon village.
	Medieval settlement and open field system	Settlement	Hulland; SK2433546998	Immediately north of Old Hall
	Medieval settlement and part of an open field system	Settlement	Callow; SK2672551981	250m north-west of Callow Hall
	Medieval settlement	Settlement	Smerrill; SK2005461855	Immediately south-east of Smerrill Grange
	Medieval settlement including part of open field system	Settlement	Mapleton; SK1672747692	200m South of Bank Farm
	Medieval settlement on the north western slopes of Cales Dale	Settlement	Monyash; SK1656264813	490m north-west of Cales Farm
	Medieval settlement, including fishpond and open field system	Settlement	Tissington; SK1942052117	Immediately north and 240m south of Lea Cottage Farm
	Medieval settlement, including open field system	Settlement	Hungry Bentley; SK1787238669	Immediately west of Bentley Fields Farm
	Medieval settlement, including site of chapel and part of the open field system	Settlement	Alkmonton; SK1937437582	Immediately north-east of Alkmonton Old Hall Farm
	Meerbrook sough portal	Mining	Wirksworth; SK3267155246	380m south-west of Leashaw Farm
	Middleton Moor platformed bowl barrow	Barrow	Middleton-by-Wirksworth; SK2645755709	
	Middleton Top winding engine house, wheels and wheel-pit	Mining	Middleton-by-Wirksworth; SK2759955177	
	Moat Low bowl barrow	Barrow	Newton Grange; SK1550853995	
	Moated Yeaveley Preceptory, chapel and fishpond at Stydd Hall	Moated site	Yeaveley; SK1722740007	Founded in 1190. Preceptories like this were founded in order to raise revenues to fund the Knights Hospitaller's 12th- and 13th-century crusades to Jerusalem. Chapel remains are a Grade I listed building.
	Moated site	Moated site	Edlaston and Wyaston; SK1757842922	60m west of Edlaston Hall
	Moated site and fishponds	Moated site	South Darley; SK2798660545	300m north-east of Snitterton Hall
	Moated site at Shirley Hall	Moated site	Shirley; SK2202541794	
	Moneystones bowl barrow north	Barrow	Hartington; SK1508361633	
	Moneystones bowl barrow south	Barrow	Hartington; SK1516761524	
	Moot Low bowl barrow	Barrow	Brassington; SK2393356564	
	Motte and bailey castle on Castle Hill	Castle	Bakewell; SK2212068775	
	Mouldridge Grange, earthworks	Embankment	Brassington; SK2016159255	Earthworks and buried remains of a medieval Augustinian monastic grange (farmstead). Immediately South of Mouldrige Grange Farm.
	Mount Pleasant lead mines	Mining	South Darley; SK2633860892	Immediately south of Wensley
	Nether Haddon medieval settlement	Settlement	Nether Haddon; SK2276965840	Includes part of an open field system, Romano-British field system and lead mining remains. 600m south-west of Haddon Hall.
	Nether Low bowl barrow	Barrow	Chelmorton; SK1088969177	
	Nettly Knowe bowl barrow	Barrow	Eaton and Alsop; SK1522456112	
	Newburgh Level at Red Rake Mine	Mining	Calver; SK2385874048	
	Nine Stone Close small stone circle	Henge	Harthill; SK2254262643	A Bronze Age stone circle near Winster. It is sometimes known as Grey Ladies.
	North Lees Chapel	Chapel	Outseats; SK2333783552	
	Northern Dale lead mines	Mining	South Darley; SK2671060022	
	Old Millclose engine house and associated features	Mining	South Darley; SK2578461832	Ruined buildings, earthworks and buried remains. The engine house was built in 1859 to pump water from the Old Millclose lead mine up the Watts engine shaft. 570m south-west of Cowley Hall.
	One Arch Bridge	Bridge	Edensor; SK2607168442	Bridge over the River Derwent near Chatsworth, built in 1760 by James Paine. Also a Grade II* listed building.
	Osmaston Fields bowl barrow, south	Barrow	Osmaston; SK1865343991	
Padley Chapel and Ruins of Padley Hall	Padley Hall: a medieval great house	House	Grindleford; SK2471378996	Ruins of a large double courtyard house where, in 1588, two Catholic priests were discovered and then hanged, drawn and quartered in Derby. They became known as the 'Padley Martyrs'.
	Parsley Hay bowl barrow	Barrow	Hartington; SK1449163151	
	Pilsbury Castle Hills motte and bailey castle	Castle	Pilsbury; SK1138863867	Site of a Norman castle near the village of Pilsbury, overlooking the River Dove.
	Platform cairn, South of Hill Rake	Cairns	Hazlebadge; SK1731180320	
	Prehistoric and Romano-British barrow and medieval animal pen	Barrow	Ballidon; SK2038456495	450m south-east of Roystone Grange
	Prehistoric landscape on Big Moor and Ramsley Moor	Landscape	Baslow; SK2725575460	
	Promontory fort, South of Ballcross Farm	Fort	Bakewell; SK2278469124	
	Putwell Hill bowl barrow	Barrow	Brushfield; SK1709371824	
	Putwell Hill Mine	Mining	Little Longstone; SK1742471754	
	Railway embankment, north of Wirksworth	Embankment	Cromford; SK2894555519	
	Rainslow Scrins	Mining	Elton; SK2215860210	470m south-west of Leadmines Farm
	Ravensdale deer park, lodge, mill and fishpond	Park	Mercaston; SK2683643264	
	Remains of Nether Ratchwood and Rantor lead mines	Mining	Middleton-by-Wirksworth; SK2838554943	200m west of Old Lane
	Ring cairn and cairn	Cairns	Darley Dale; SK2776265914	750m north-west of Bumper Castle
	Ring cairn and cairnfield on Eaglestone Flat	Cairns	Curbar; SK2652973877	270m east of Eagle Stone
	Ringham Low bowl barrow	Barrow	Middleton-by-Youlgreave; SK1790961938	
	Rockhurst long barrow and adjacent bowl barrow	Barrow	Brassington; SK2141657373	
	Rolley Low bowl barrow	Barrow	Great Longstone; SK1844273621	
	Romano-British field system	Field system	Ballidon; SK2027656293	420m south-east of Roystone Grange
	Romano-British field wall and embankment	Field system	Ballidon; SK1984256619	200m south-west of Roystone Grange
	Romano-British settlement and field system at Rainster Rocks	Settlement	Brassington; SK2193054725	Site of settlement below the dolomitic limestone outcrop of Rainster Rocks with terraces, embankments, platforms and boulder field walls.
	Romano-British settlement and field system	Settlement	Ballidon; SK1999356864	Immediately north-west of Roystone Grange
	Romano-British settlement and field system	Settlement	Ballidon; SK1996356194	600m South of Roystone Grange
	4 Round cairns near Hob Hurst's House	Cairns	Beeley; SK2898069209; SK2899369138; SK2859368272; SK2856268356	240m East, 275m South, 970m South and 890m SSW of Hob Hurst's House
	Round cairn near New Barn	Cairns	Taddington; SK1465772979	460m north of New Barn
	2 Round cairns near Offerton House	Cairns	Offerton; SK2077780661; SK2067880625	680m and 780m south-west of Offerton House
	2 Round cairns on Curbar Edge	Cairns	Curbar; SK2589475091; SK2549375596	
	6 Round cairns on Harland Edge	Cairns	Beeley; SK2883769198; SK2940868894; SK2889968754; SK2938268518; SK2938768257; SK2961168296	
	Round Low bowl barrow	Barrow	Brassington; SK2388854898	
	Rowsley Bridge	Bridge	Rowsley; SK2567165892	Spans the River Derwent. Also a Grade II* listed building.
	Roystone Grange bowl barrow	Barrow	Ballidon; SK2046956874	
	Sharp Low bowl barrow	Barrow	Tissington; SK1613252863	
	Sheepwash Bank and Dennis Knoll prehistoric settlement and field system	Settlement	Outseats; SK2296784152	
	Sheepwash Bridge	Bridge	Ashford-in-the-Water; SK1943169608	A medieval packhorse bridge with a stone sheep pen on one side. Lambs were held in the pen while the ewes were driven across the river to reach them, cleaning their fleeces on the way. Also a Grade II* listed building.
	Site of bole near Harewood Grange	Metalworks	Beeley; SK2974368140	1400m west of Harewood Grange
	Site of bole and funerary cairn near Harewood Grange	Cairns	Beeley; SK3004768157	1120m west of Harewood Grange
	Slack, Mount Pleasant and Barmasters Grove lead mines	Mining	Bonsall; SK2579059483	390m south-east of Blakelow Farm
	Small stone circle and central cairn on Eyam Moor	Cairns	Eyam; SK2323578810	370m south of Fern Cottage
	Small stone circle on Smelting Hill	Henge	Abney; SK2027580394	560m north-east of Lane End Farm
	Smerrill Barn bowl barrow	Barrow	Smerrill; SK1871160345	
	Smerrill Moor bowl barrow	Barrow	Smerrill; SK1844060803	
	Snake Mine nucleated lead mine	Mining	Middleton-by-Wirksworth; SK2618055506	275m SSW of Hopton Quarries
	Stanage Edge Roman road	Road	Outseats; SK2346984890	Long Causeway which ran between Sheffield in South Yorkshire and Hathersage.
	Stand Low hlaew	Burial mound	Newton Grange; SK1591253580	
	Standing cross in the churchyard of All Saints' Church	Cross	Bradbourne; SK2082052746	
	Standing cross in the churchyard of St Mary's Church	Cross	Wirksworth; SK2872353963	
	Standing cross in the churchyard of St Michael and All Angels	Cross	Taddington; SK1414571126	
	Standing cross in the churchyard of St Peter's Church	Cross	Somersal Herbert; SK1362235145	
	Standing cross known as Wheston Cross	Cross	Wheston; SK1319476438	
	Stoke Flat East prehistoric field system	Field system	Baslow; SK2547076427	
	Stoke Flat South prehistoric field system	Field system	Baslow; SK2534175852	
	Stoke Flat West prehistoric field system and stone circle	Field system	Froggatt; SK2500076595	
	Stone circle near High Lees Farm	Henge	Outseats; SK2211184533	960m north-east of High Lees Farm
	The Warren Romano-British settlement	Settlement	Outseats; SK2335383716	320m north-west of North Lees Hall
	Tides Low bowl barrow, limekiln and standing stone	Barrow	Tideswell; SK1499177946	
	Tideslow Rake lead rake and lime kiln	Mining	Tideswell; SK1538577961	
	Tinker's Inn bowl barrow, north	Barrow	Clifton and Compton; SK1810144804	
	Tinker's Inn bowl barrow, south	Barrow	Clifton and Compton; SK1808644315	
	Triple cairn, cairnfield and bole sites extending south westwards from Raven Tor	Cairns	Beeley; SK2802966737	
	True Blue nucleated lead mine	Mining	Sheldon; SK1780768005	Small mineworkings from 18th to early 20th century. The monument includes earthworks of spoil heaps, capped shafts, settling pit, pond and coes. 600m ESE of Magpie Mine
	Tup Low bowl barrow	Barrow	Grindlow; SK1871076986	
	Two round cairns near Offerton House	Cairns	Offerton; SK2081080533	750m south-west of Offerton House
	Viator's Bridge over the River Dove, Milldale	Bridge	Milldale; SK1390954664	Also a Grade II listed building.
	Village settlement and barrows east of Gardom's Edge	Settlement	Baslow; SK2760873337	
	Vincent Knoll bowl barrow	Barrow	Hartington; SK1371963568	
	Wardlow Hay Cop bowl barrow	Barrow	Wardlow; SK1785173974	
	Wayside cross known as Whibbersley Cross	Cross	Baslow; SK2958172745	
	White Cliff bowl barrow	Barrow	Little Longstone; SK1815772179	
	White Rake long barrow and bowl barrow	Barrow	Great Longstone; SK1978274758	
	Winster Pitts and Drummer's Venture lead mines	Mining	Winster; SK2468360279	
	Wolfscote Hill bowl barrow	Barrow	Hartington; SK1371058320	
	Workshops, offices and terminus (Cromford and High Peak Railway)	Railway	Cromford; SK3133155988	Within the World Heritage Site of Derwent Valley Mills. Includes High Peak Junction workshops and Wharf Shed (where goods were transferred between canal barges and trains, on one of the world's oldest railways).
	Wyaston hlaew	Burial mound	Edlaston and Wyaston; SK1911042013	

== See also ==
- Scheduled monuments in Derbyshire
  - Scheduled monuments in Amber Valley
  - Scheduled monuments in Bolsover
  - Scheduled monuments in Chesterfield
  - Scheduled monuments in Derby
  - Scheduled monuments in the Borough of Erewash
  - Scheduled monuments in High Peak
  - Scheduled monuments in North East Derbyshire
  - Scheduled monuments in South Derbyshire
- Grade I listed buildings in Derbyshire
- Grade II* listed buildings in Derbyshire Dales
