= Gautries Rake =

Scheduled monument in Castleton, Derbyshire

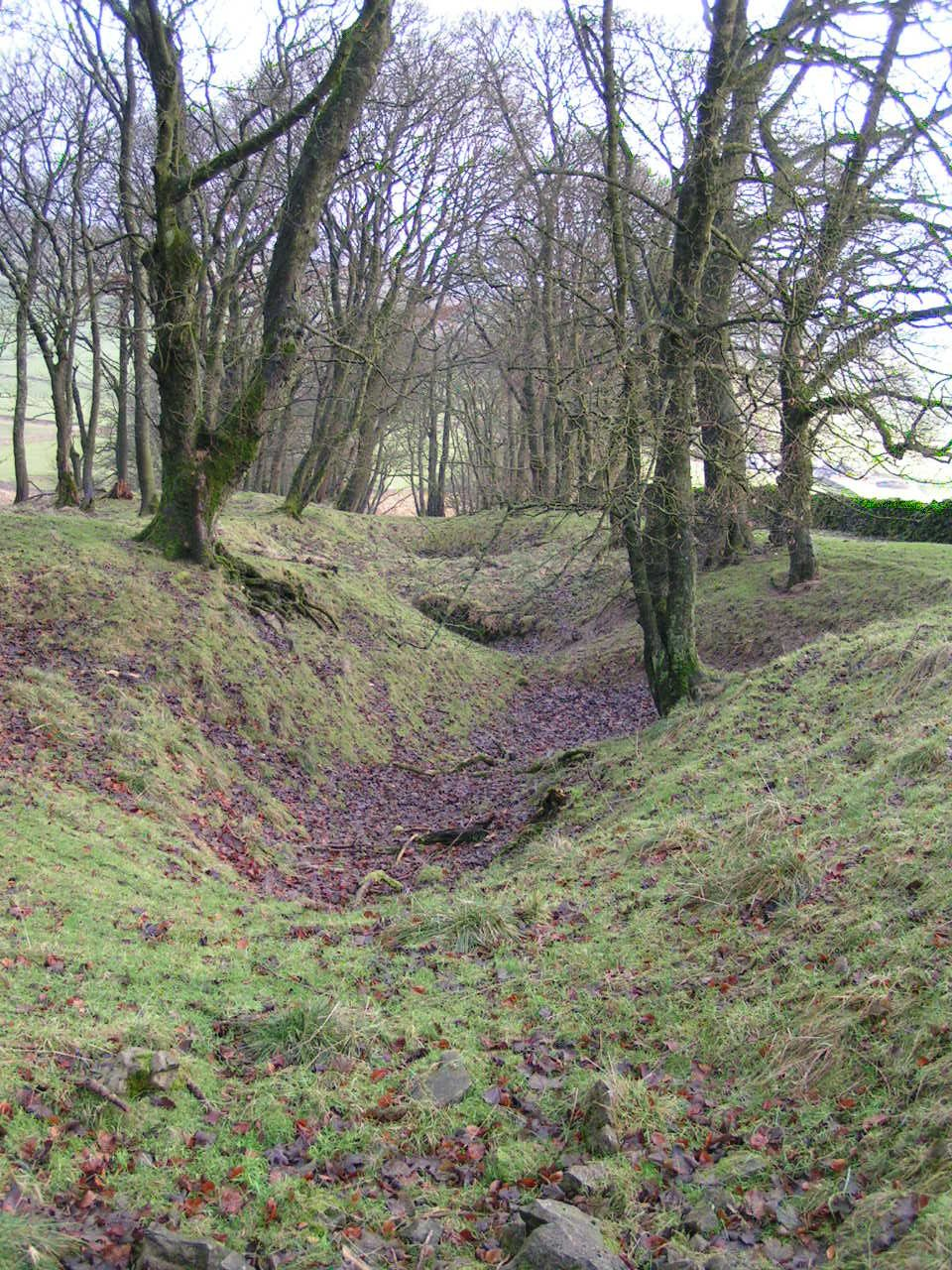
- Gautries Rake
- Interactive map of Gautries Rake
- 53°19′34″N 1°50′59″W
- Periods: late Middle Ages
- Location: Sparrowpit
- Region: Derbyshire, England

Scheduled monument
- Official name: Gautries Rake
- Designated: 21 March 2013
- Reference no.: 1412938

Gautries Rake in Sparrowpit, Derbyshire, east of Chapel-en-le-Frith is a preserved example of a linear sequence of lead mine workings that date back to at least the late 17th century.

The remains were classified as a scheduled monument on 21 March 2013.

== See also ==
- Scheduled monuments in High Peak
