= Listed buildings in Beeley =

Beeley is a civil parish in the Derbyshire Dales district of Derbyshire, England. The parish contains 20 listed buildings that are recorded in the National Heritage List for England. Of these, three are listed at Grade II*, the middle of the three grades, and the others are at Grade II, the lowest grade. The parish contains the village of Beeley and the surrounding countryside and moorland, mainly to the east of the village. Most of the listed buildings are houses, cottages, and associated structures. The other listed buildings include a church, a public house, a guide post and guide stone, a farmhouse, a converted barn, a former school, and a former vicarage.

== Key ==
Grade	Criteria
II*	Particularly important buildings of more than special interest
II	Buildings of national importance and special interest

== Buildings ==
Name and location	Photograph	Date	Notes	Grade
St Anne's Church; 53.20524°N 1.60487°W		12th century	The church has been altered and extended through the centuries, the nave was rebuilt in 1819, and the church was restored in 1882–84. It is built in gritstone with roofs of lead and Welsh slate, and consists of a nave, a north aisle, a south porch, a chancel with a north vestry and a west tower. The tower has two unequal stages, diagonal buttresses, single-light bell openings with depressed ogee heads, and an embattled parapet with corner crocketed pinnacles. In the south wall of the chancel is a priest's doorway.	II*
Beeley Hilltop House; 53.21209°N 1.59803°W		Early 17th century	A manor house in sandstone, with quoins, moulded bands, and a stone slate roof with coped gables. There are three storeys and a truncated H-shaped plan. In the east front is a round-arched doorway with impost blocks and a keystone, and the south front has a doorway with a moulded surround. Most of the windows are mullioned or mullioned and transomed, some with hood moulds. Attached to the southeast is a wall containing gate piers with moulded capitals and ball finials.	II*
Old Hall, wall and doorway 53.20449°N 1.60229°W	—	Early 17th century	A manor house in gritstone, with quoins, and a stone slate roof with coped gables. There are two and three storeys, and a south front of five bays. On the front is with a two-storey gabled porch, and a doorway with a chamfered surround and massive quoins and lintel. Most of the windows are mullioned, or mullioned and transomed, with hood moulds. Attached to the east is a dry stone wall with chamfered copings, containing a gateway with a moulded lintel and quoins.	II*
Norman House, cottage and barn 53.20425°N 1.60253°W		17th century	The buildings are in gritstone with quoins, and stone slate roofs with coped gables and moulded kneelers. The house has three storeys, the gable end facing the street, with two bays, bands, and two-light mullioned windows. The cottage has a single storey and attics, sash windows, and gabled half-dormers. The barn projects to the east and contains a cart entry.	II
Outbuilding, Old Hall; 53.20450°N 1.60199°W	—	17th century	The outbuilding is in gritstone with quoins and a Welsh slate roof. There is a single storey, and it contains a doorway and a three-light mullioned window. Inside is a pair of cruck trusses.	II
Pynot Cottage; 53.20403°N 1.60188°W	—	17th century	The cottage is in gritstone, and has a stone slate roof with coped gables and moulded kneelers. There are two storeys and three bays, and a single-storey wing to the east. On the front are casement windows in the ground floor, a two-light mullioned stair window, and two-light mullioned windows in the upper floor. The wing contains a doorway with a parapet and a bracketed hood.	II
The Cottage; 53.20452°N 1.60348°W	—	17th century	The cottage is in gritstone, and has a stone slate roof with coped gables and moulded kneelers. There are two storeys and three bays. The central doorway has a chamfered surround of massive quoins and a lintel. Above the doorway is a single-light window, and the other windows are mullioned with three lights.	II
Beeley Hilltop Farm Cottage and outbuildings 53.21246°N 1.59940°W	—	18th century	The house and outbuildings are in sandstone with stone slate roofs. The house has two storeys, an L-shaped plan, and a west front of five bays. The doorway has stone jambs and a bracketed hood. Some of the windows are casements, and others are mullioned. The outbuildings contain a segmental-arched cart entrance.	II
Barn west of Norman House; 53.20440°N 1.60292°W	—	18th century (probable)	A barn and haybarn, the barn partly converted into a house, the building is in gritstone with quoins, and stone slate roofs with coped gables and moulded kneelers. There are two storeys and an L-shaped plan. The north range contains casement windows and doors, and on the south front is a two-bay open arcade with stone pillars and timber lintels. The south range is an open haybarn with six bays.	II
Post Office and adjoining cottage 53.20363°N 1.60459°W	—	18th century	The cottages are in gritstone with a Westmorland slate roof. There are two storeys and four bays. The cottage to the left has a doorway with a massive lintel and quoins, and two-light mullioned windows. The Post Office has a shop window, casement windows, and in the upper floor are mullioned windows.	II
Devonshire Arms; 53.20336°N 1.60453°W		Late 18th century	The public house is in gritstone, with quoins, and stone slate roofs with coped gables and moulded kneelers. There are two storeys, and the building is in two parts. The right part has three bays, a floor band, a central porch that has a segmental pointed arch with a moulded cornice, and two-light mullioned windows. The left part is lower, with two bays, and has a central doorway with a bracketed hood, mullioned windows to its left and casement windows to its right.	II
Fold Cottage; 53.20289°N 1.60472°W	—	Late 18th century	The cottage is in gritstone, with a Welsh slate roof, two storeys and four bays. On the front are two doorways, some windows have single lights, and the others are mullioned with two lights.	II
Guide post, Beeley Moor; 53.21962°N 1.56862°W		Late 18th century (probable)	The guide post consists of a square gritstone post about 5 feet (1.5 m) high. It is inscribed on the sides with pointing hands, and the directions towards Sheffield, Chesterfield, and Bakewell.	II
Guide stone, Beeley Lane; 53.20289°N 1.56009°W		Late 18th century (possible)	The guide post consists of a square gritstone post about 3 feet (0.91 m) high. It is inscribed on the sides with pointing hands, and the directions towards Offerton, Chesterfield, Chatsworth, and Bakewell.	II
The Duke's Barn; 53.20481°N 1.60264°W	—	1791	The barn, later converted for other purposes, is in gritstone with quoins, and a tile roof with a coped gable, moulded kneelers, and a ball finial to the west. At the west end are three full-height round arches, two infilled, and one with a moulded datestone in the spandrel. To the right are two storeys containing doorways, windows, and a segmental-headed cart entrance.	II
Fallange Farmhouse; 53.19513°N 1.59748°W	—	Early 19th century	The farmhouse is in gritstone and has a stone slate roof with coped gables and kneelers. There are two storeys and three bays. The central doorway has a rectangular fanlight, and the windows are mullioned with two lights.	II
Beeley Lodge; 53.21258°N 1.60783°W		c. 1840	The lodge is at the southern entrance to the grounds of Chatsworth House, and is in Tudor style. It is in gritstone, with bracketed eaves and a tile roof, partly hipped, and has a gable with chamfered coping and moulded kneelers to the south. It is in two storeys, with single-storey wings. The west front has two bays, and in the ground floor is a square bay window and a canted bay window. The upper floor contains two-light mullioned windows in half-dormers, one with a hipped roof, the other with a hood mould and gable.	II
Old School and walls 53.20459°N 1.60283°W	—	1841	The school, later two cottages, was designed by Joseph Paxton. It is in gritstone with quoins, and a stone slate roof with chamfered gable copings, kneelers and cross finials. There is a single storey and an L-shaped plan. The gabled wing on the left has a projecting porch with a four-centred arched entrance and side windows. There is a similar doorway in the main range, and the windows are mullioned. To the south, enclosing the former playground, is a wall with chamfered copings and gate piers with pyramidal caps.	II
Dorset House, coach house and walls 53.20490°N 1.60494°W		1850	A vicarage, later a private house, it is in Gothic style, built in gritstone, and has tile roofs with coped gables and moulded kneelers. There are two storeys a double-depth plan, and a south front of three bays with steep gables, containing a doorway and mullioned windows. In the west front is a Gothic doorway with a double-chamfered arch, and a window with Gothic tracery, and to the left is a porch with lancet windows. To the east is a chamfered coped wall enclosing a courtyard, and containing a Gothic archway with a stepped gable. The coach house to the east of the house has a segmental-arched carriage entrance and a pyramidal roof.	II
The Square; 53.20362°N 1.60420°W		Mid 19th century	A group of three cottages in gritstone, with angle quoins, and a tile roof partly with pitched gables, and partly half-hipped. The cottages have two storeys and form a Y-shaped plan. The doorways have chamfered surrounds. Some of the windows have single lights, the others are mullioned, and all have diamond glazing bars.	II
