= Scheduled monuments in High Peak =

This is a list of scheduled monuments in the district of High Peak in the English county of Derbyshire.

In the United Kingdom, a scheduled monument is a "nationally important" archaeological site or historic building that has been given protection against unauthorised change by being placed on a list (or "schedule") by the Secretary of State for Culture, Media and Sport; English Heritage takes the leading role in identifying such sites. Scheduled monuments are defined in the Ancient Monuments and Archaeological Areas Act 1979 and the National Heritage Act 1983. There are about 20,000 scheduled monument entries on the list, which is maintained by English Heritage; more than one site can be included in a single entry.

While a scheduled monument can also be recognised as a listed building, English Heritage considers listed building status as a better way of protecting buildings than scheduled monument status. If a monument is considered by English Heritage to "no longer merit scheduling" it can be descheduled.

Derbyshire has over 500 scheduled monuments including many stone cairns, stone circles, barrow burial mounds, lead mining relics, ancient settlements, and over 20 bridges.

== List ==
Image	Name and reference	Feature	Location	Notes
	Anglian high cross in the churchyard of St Peter's Church, Hope	Cross	Hope; SK17238345	Also a Grade II listed building. 9th-century gritstone cross with Celtic decoration.
	Anglo-Scandinavian high cross in the churchyard of St Thomas Becket Church	Cross	Chapel-en-le-Frith; SK0576280813	Also a Grade II listed building.
Shall Cross at Taxal	Anglo-Scandinavian high cross known as the Shall Cross	Cross	Whaley BridgeSK0163579639	9th- or 10th-century gritstone cross. A sundial was installed on the shaft in the 18th or 19th century, in place of the original cross head.
	Anthony Hill bowl barrow	Barrow	Buxton; SK0465370662	A partial excavation by Thomas Bateman in 1851 revealed a boar's tusk and scattered human bone. The appearance and location indicate that it dates to the Bronze Age.
	2 bowl barrows on Withery Low	Barrow	Wormhill; SK1022876519; SK1016576498	
	2 bowl barrows on Bole Hill	Barrow	Wormhill; SK1071575692; SK1063075554	
	Bronze Age field system	Field system	Bamford; SK2077086292	400m south-east of Ladybower Inn
	Bugsworth canal basin, tramway, quarry and limekilns	Quarrying	Buxworth; SK0245282063	
	Bull Ring henge, oval barrow and bowl barrow	Henge	Dove Holes; SK0784678237	Neolithic circular earthwork about 50m across. It has a central flat area surrounded by a ditch and a bank. There are also two burial mounds about 20m from the henge.
	Cairn near Howden Reservoir Dam	Cairns	Derwent; SK1692091891	550m south of Howden Reservoir dam wall; submerged when the reservoir is full.
	Cairn on Bamford Edge, near Mooredge	Cairns	Bamford; SK2084284857	500m NE of Mooredge
	Cairn on Bamford Edge, near Clough House	Cairns	Bamford; SK2136984350	570m NE of Clough House
	Cairn on Bamford Moor, near Great Tor	Cairns	Bamford; SK2139084775	500m East of Great Tor
	Cairn on Bamford Moor, near High Lees Farm	Cairns	Bamford; SK2153184424	680m North of High Lees Farm
	Cairn on Bamford Moor, near Crow Chin	Cairns	Bamford; SK2161585859	850m NW of Crow Chin
	2 Cairns on Bamford Moor, near Clough House	Cairns	Bamford; SK2139084775; SK2139084775	960m and 975m NE of Clough House
	Cairn on Ludworth Intakes	Cairns	Ludworth, near Stockport; SJ9898091310	
	2 Cairnfields near High Lees Farm	Cairns	Bamford; SK2174684322; SK2192984422	600m and 775m NNE of High Lees Farm
	Cairnfield near Ladybower Inn	Cairns	Bamford; SK2071685856	710m and 840m SE of Ladybower Inn
	Cairnfield and quarry on Bamford Edge	Cairns	Bamford; SK2109484582	720m North of Clough House
	Coalpithole Rake	Mining	Perryfoot near Sparrowpit; SK0989781114	
	Cow Low bowl barrow	Barrow	Chapel-en-le-Frith; SK0653778665	
	Cow Low bowl barrow (Tunstead Quarry)	Barrow	Buxton; SK1027472976	A sub-circular Bronze Age burial mound 29m by 25m and 1.7m high. During excavations in 1846, Thomas Bateman discovered several crouched skeletons, jet necklaces, a hexagonal cist and evidence of burials up to c.AD700.
	Cowdale Quarry limestone extraction and processing site	Quarrying	King Sterndale, Buxton; SK0791672480	A lime extraction plant since the late 19th century. The quarry operated its traditional, coal-fired kilns until its closure in 1954. 540m NE of Staden Manor.
	Crookstone Hill round cairn	Cairns	Hope; SK1489788197	
	Cup-marked stone	Stone	Chisworth; SK0069290942	80m East of Robin Hood's Picking Rods
	Eldon Hill bowl barrow	Barrow	Peak Forest; SK1155881147	Bronze Age burial mound with a recent summit cairn above. Excavations in the 1860s and 1870s found several human skeletons in a tomb with stone structures.
	Eldon Hill crushing circle, associated lead mining remains and palisaded enclosure	Mining	Peak Forest; SK1175581132	7m wide crushing circle with remnants of paving and central edge runner stone. The site also includes remains of shafts and a stone shed. Site of mining of a lead ore vein called Burning Drake Vein.
	Engine Sough and associated nucleated lead mine	Mining	Castleton; SK1274383253	500m South of Mam Tor
	Fox Low bowl barrow	Barrow	Buxton; SK0672971236	A sub-circular cairn 16m by 14.5m and c.1.5m high. Partially excavated by Thomas Bateman in 1850 and found to contain human remains. The appearance and location indicate it to be of the Bronze Age.
	Gautries Hill bowl barrow	Barrow	Peak Forest; SK0987180982	
	Gautries Rake	Mining	Peak Forest; SK1009980821	
	Green Low ringcairn	Cairns	Chapel-en-le-Frith; SK0840482989	
	Harrod Low long barrow	Barrow	Peak Forest; SK0984480592	
	Hill's Venture lead mine	Mining	Peak Forest; SK1243379278	
	Hollins Hill bowl barrow	Barrow	Hartington; SK0604067909	
	Hope Motte	Fort	Hope; SK1715383433	
	Hordron Edge stone circle	Henge	Derwent; SK2152486851	540m SE of Cutthroat Bridge
	How Grove Lead Mine	Mining	Castleton; SK1484681785	
	Kinderlow bowl barrow	Barrow	Hayfield; SK0732486665	
	Lady Low barrow	Barrow	Chapel-en-le-Frith; SK0653278188	
	Lismore Fields Mesolithic and Neolithic settlement	Settlement	Buxton; SK0498473218	The first inhabitants of Buxton made their home at Lismore Fields 6,000 years ago. The Stone Age settlement was discovered in 1984 with remains of a Mesolithic timber roundhouse, Neolithic longhouses and one of the oldest pots ever found in Britain. Lismore Fields could be the earliest cereal cultivation site discovered in Britain.
	Lord's Seat bowl barrow	Barrow	Edale; SK1124983461	
	Market cross	Cross	Chapel-en-le-Frith; SK0570880703	Also a Grade II listed building.
	Medieval hospital	Hospital	Castleton; SK1554783329	530m SE of Losehill Hall
	Melandra Castle (Ardotalia) Roman fort	Fort	Glossop; SK0093595049	Ardotalia (also known as Melandra, or Melandra Castle) is a Roman fort in Gamesley, near Glossop.
Centurion Stone from Navio Roman Fort	Navio Roman Fort and vicus	Fort	Brough-on-Noe near Hope; SK1818682692	Originally built of timber and earthworks around 100 BC. It was rebuilt in stone around 150BC and was in use until around 350 AD. The site now consists of earthwork banks and ditches around an earthen platform, buried remains and a few exposed stone slabs. Excavations in 1903 revealed an underground chamber of the Principia or headquarters building.
	New Rake lead mines	Mining	Castleton; SK1376482034	600m SE of Rowter Farm
	Odin Mine nucleated lead mine and ore works	Mining	Castleton; SK1341283493	The oldest documented mine in Derbyshire and thought to be one of the oldest lead mines in England. 350m WNW of Knowlegates Farm.
	Oval Cairn at Gospel Hillocks, Cowdale	Cairns	King Sterndale, Buxton; SK0862771485	One of two cairns lying c.100m apart. Measuring 28m x 18.5m and now less than 1m high. Neolithic in shape and 19th-century excavations found a polished flint axe, buried human remains on a limestone slab and several jet buttons. A stone cist contained two further burials, fragments of Beaker pottery and flint flakes, suggesting reuse of the cairn into the early Bronze Age.
	Ox Low oval barrow	Barrow	Peak Forest; SK1300380542	
	Oxlow Rake lead mines	Mining	Castleton; SK1285780329	
	Palisaded hilltop enclosure	Enclosure	Castleton; SK1561182072	230m SSE of Dirt Low
	Part of Goyt's Moss colliery	Mining	Buxton; SK0145571773	Centered 220m south west of Derbyshire Bridge
	Peakshill or Oden sough	Mining	Peak Forest; SK1172382953	
	Perry Dale bowl barrow and long barrow	Barrow	Peak Forest; SK1091981183	
Peveril Castle and Cavedale	Peveril Castle eleventh to fourteenth century tower keep castle	Castle	Castleton; SK1485382540	A ruined 11th-century castle overlooking the village of Castleton. It was the main settlement of William Peverel. Also a Grade I listed building.
	Pike Low bowl barrow	Barrow	Derwent; SK1803189747	
	Pin Dale lead side veins	Mining	Castleton; SK1582282340	
	Prehistoric standing stone	Stone	Bamford; SK2201284694	1 km SW of triangulation point on High Neb
	Promontory fort on Combs Edge	Fort	Chapel-en-le-Frith; SK0536478410	Castle Naze Iron Age hillfort on Combs Moss
	Reconstructed packhorse bridge from Derwent Hall	Bridge	Bamford, Hope Valley; SK1692295123	When Ladybower Reservoir was built, Derwent's packhorse bridge, spanning the River Derwent near the main gates of Derwent Hall, was removed stone by stone and rebuilt at Slippery Stones, at the head of Howden Reservoir. Also a Grade II listed building.
	Ring cairn on Bamford Moor	Cairns	Bamford; SK2088585254	900m NE of Lydgate Farm
	Ringwork in Castlehill Wood	Earthwork	Glossop; SK0281195507	
	Roman fortlet	Fort	Tintwistle; SK0642899012	320m East of Highstones
	Romano-British farmstead	Settlement	Bamford; SK2091486576	475m East of Ladybower Inn
	Romano-British farmstead and post-medieval charcoal burning site	Settlement	Derwent; SK2089886884	570m NE of Ladybower Inn
	Round barrow	Barrow	Castleton	500m SW of Peveril Castle; SK1470982218
	Round cairn near Crookhill Farm	Cairns	Hope Woodlands; SK1824786951	430m West of Crookhill Farm
	Round cairn and clearance cairn	Cairns	Hope Woodlands; SK1794487116	770m NW of Crookhill Farm
	Round cairn at Gospel Hillocks, Cowdale	Cairns	King Sterndale, Buxton; SK0870671575	One of two cairns lying c.100m apart, measuring 14m x 13m and c.1m high. It was opened in 1896 and found to contain a pit under a large slab with a crouched body covered with a mixture of clay, leaves and charcoal (associated with burnt bones).
	Round cairn between Coombes Edge and Cown Edge	Cairns	Charlesworth; SK0204591892	
	2 Round cairns on Bridge-end Pasture	Cairns	Hope Woodlands; SK1728687724; SK1764587742	300m and 600m NE of Two Thorne Fields Farm
	Slight univallate hillfort and two bowl barrows on Mam Tor	Fort	Castleton; SK1276183716	
	Slitherstone and Linacre lead mines and a limekiln	Mining	Castleton; SK1265981570	725m SW of Rowter Farm
	Snelslow Plantation bowl barrow	Barrow	Peak Forest; SK1188979424	
	Staden Low earthwork	Earthwork	Staden, Buxton; SK0690672116	A circular Neolithic earthwork excavated in 1926 by Mr R Woolescroft, who discovered a stone axe head, flint artefacts, pottery fragments and pieces of deer antler.
	Standing cross in the churchyard of St Peter's Church, Hope	Cross	Hope; SK1723883439	
	Standing cross in the churchyard of St Thomas Becket Church	Cross	Chapel-en-le-Frith; SK0575880808	
	Stone circle near Crookhill Farm	Henge	Hope Woodlands; SK1847187113	330m NW of Crookhill Farm
	The Folly platform cairn	Cairns	Hope; SK1681982891	
	The Grey Ditch	Earthwork	Brough and Shatton; SK1684381835	
	The Tong bowl barrow and long barrow	Barrow	Wormhill; SK1169376993	
	Town defences	Defences	Castleton; SK1495782991	13th-century earthwork bank and ditch remains 270m north and 350m north-east of Peveril Castle
	Two hlaews at Haslin House	Burial mound	Buxton; SK0625170540	Pre-Christian burial mounds from the 7th century AD. The northernmost is 14m by 13m and 0.7m high and was partially excavated in 1850 by Thomas Bateman. It contained a small central cairn over a rock-cut grave, with human remains buried in a wooden coffin or surrounded by wooden planks.
	Watt's Grove Rake lead mines	Mining	Peak Forest; SK1169380661	520m north of Sweetknoll
	Wayside and a boundary cross known as Robin Hood's Picking Rods	Cross	Chisworth; SK0061290938	
	Wayside and boundary cross known as Edale Cross	Cross	Hayfield; SK0771786099	
	Wayside and boundary cross known as The Dipping Stone	Cross	Whaley Bridge; SJ9955681714	
	Wayside cross known as Eccles Cross	Cross	Hope; SK1723183480	The 13th-century cross was moved to St Peter's churchyard in 1966 from higher ground c.500m away by the lane to Eccles House Farm.
	Wind Low bowl barrow and standing cross	Cross	Wormhill; SK1143575162	Base of a medieval standing cross and barrow mound 16m by 12m. Excavation by Thomas Bateman in 1846 found Bronze-Age human remains, jewellery & pottery fragments.

== See also ==
- Scheduled monuments in Derbyshire
  - Scheduled monuments in Amber Valley
  - Scheduled monuments in Bolsover
  - Scheduled monuments in Chesterfield
  - Scheduled monuments in Derby
  - Scheduled monuments in Derbyshire Dales
  - Scheduled monuments in the Borough of Erewash
  - Scheduled monuments in North East Derbyshire
  - Scheduled monuments in South Derbyshire
- Grade I listed buildings in Derbyshire
- Grade II* listed buildings in High Peak
