= Scheduled monuments in South Derbyshire =

This is a list of scheduled monuments in the district of South Derbyshire in the English county of Derbyshire.

In the United Kingdom, a scheduled monument is a "nationally important" archaeological site or historic building that has been given protection against unauthorised change by being placed on a list (or "schedule") by the Secretary of State for Culture, Media and Sport; English Heritage takes the leading role in identifying such sites. Scheduled monuments are defined in the Ancient Monuments and Archaeological Areas Act 1979 and the National Heritage Act 1983. There are about 20,000 scheduled monument entries on the list, which is maintained by English Heritage; more than one site can be included in a single entry.

While a scheduled monument can also be recognised as a listed building, English Heritage considers listed building status as a better way of protecting buildings than scheduled monument status. If a monument is considered by English Heritage to "no longer merit scheduling" it can be rescheduled.

Derbyshire has over 500 scheduled monuments including many stone cairns, stone circles, barrow burial mounds, lead mining relics, ancient settlements, and over 20 bridges.

== List ==
Image	Name and reference	Feature	Location	Notes
	Barton Blount medieval settlement remains	Settlement	Barton Blount; SK2069534546; SK2083934701; SK2085835001	Including a chapel, decoy pond and part of the open field system. 340m North of Barton Hall.
	Bretby Castle fortified manor	Castle	Bretby; SK2935923169	Remains of manor house buildings from the 13th to 17th century with bank and ditch defences.
	Calke Park Tunnel	Tunnel	Ticknall; SK3551923695	
	Castle Gresley motte and bailey castle	Castle	Castle Gresley; SK2793617895	
	Dovecote	Dovecote	Netherseal; SK2897512822	85m south of Netherseal Old Hall. Also a Grade II* listed building.
	Heavy Anti-aircraft gunsite	Military	Elvaston; SK4142532577	340m SE of Gardens Farm
	Henge complex NW of Hickens Bridge	Henge	Shardlow and Great Wilne; SK4281629942	
	Hoon Mount platformed bowl barrow	Barrow	Hoon; SK2300931818	
	Iron Age settlement and cursus, SE of Aston-on-Trent	Settlement	Aston Moor, Shardlow and Great Wilne; SK4203829071	
	Medieval church and cross near St George's Church	Cross	Ticknall; SK3515924042	45m south of St George's Church
	Melbourne Castle fortified manor and earlier medieval manorial remains	Castle	Melbourne; SK3891325203	A medieval castle built on the site of an earlier royal manor house in the reign of King John. Construction of the castle was started in 1311 and continued until 1322, but the work was never fully completed. Also a Grade II listed building.
	Monks Bridge	Bridge	Egginton; SK2684326989	
	Settlement site	Settlement	Aston upon Trent; SK3884029618	
	Settlement site and enclosures	Settlement	Twyford and Stenson; SK3198829045	
	Sharrow Hall moated site and associated road, driveway, dovecote, enclosures and ridge and furrow	Moated site	Osleston and Thurvaston; SK2361236952	
	Shrunken medieval village and moated site at Thurvaston	Settlement	Osleston and Thurvaston; SK2429837743	
	Slight univallate hillfort	Fort	Walton upon Trent; SK2101017542	230m SW of Old Hall Cottages
	Swarkestone Bridge	Bridge	Swarkestone; SK3702927811	Medieval bridge crossing the River Trent between the villages of Swarkestone and Stanton. Also a Grade I listed building.
	Swarkestone Lows round barrow cemetery and part of an aggregate field system	Barrow	Swarkestone; SK3671029503	300m north-west of The Lowes Farm
	Twyford henge and Round Hill bowl barrow	Henge	Twyford and Stenson; SK3333528341	
Heath Wood	Viking barrow cemetery in Heath Wood	Barrow	Ingleby; SK3419125866	Heath Wood contains a series of 59 barrows (burial mounds), which is the only known Scandinavian cremation site in the British Isles.

== See also ==
- Scheduled monuments in Derbyshire
  - Scheduled monuments in Amber Valley
  - Scheduled monuments in Bolsover
  - Scheduled monuments in Chesterfield
  - Scheduled monuments in Derby
  - Scheduled monuments in Derbyshire Dales
  - Scheduled monuments in the Borough of Erewash
  - Scheduled monuments in High Peak
  - Scheduled monuments in North East Derbyshire
- Grade I listed buildings in Derbyshire
- Grade II* listed buildings in South Derbyshire
