= Listed buildings in Chelmorton =

Chelmorton is a civil parish in the Derbyshire Dales district of Derbyshire, England. The parish contains four listed buildings that are recorded in the National Heritage List for England. Of these, one is listed at Grade II*, the middle of the three grades, and the others are at Grade II, the lowest grade. The parish contains the village of Chelmorton and the surrounding area, and the listed buildings consist of a church, a cross in the churchyard, a farmhouse, and a barn.

== Key ==
Grade	Criteria
II*	Particularly important buildings of more than special interest
II	Buildings of national importance and special interest

== Buildings ==
Name and location	Photograph	Date	Notes	Grade
Church of St John the Baptist; 53.22932°N 1.82836°W		13th century	The church was altered and extended through the centuries, and was restored in 1869–74. The chancel and tower are in gritstone, the rest of the church is in limestone, and the roofs are in tile, slate, lead, and stone slabs. The church consists of a nave with a clerestory, a north aisle, a south porch, a south transept, a chancel, and a west steeple. The steeple has a tower with two stages, stepped buttresses, a string course, twin bell openings with cusped heads, an embattled parapet, and a recessed octagonal spire with twin lucarnes. There are embattled parapets on the aisle and the chancel.	II*
Churchyard cross 53.22914°N 1.82838°W		Late medieval	The remains of the cross are in the churchyard of the Church of St John the Baptist, to the south of the south transept. The cross is in stone, and has a square base with a chamfered top. The shaft is square and tapering, with moulded corners and a broken top.	II
Townend Farmhouse; 53.22429°N 1.83563°W	—	1634	The farmhouse is in rendered stone on a plinth, with gritstone dressings, sill bands, a moulded eaves cornice, a parapet, and a stone slate roof with coped gables. There are two storeys and three bays. The central doorway has a semicircular head, fluted pilasters, moulded imposts, a fanlight, and a moulded pediment on brackets. Above it is a sash window with a semicircular head, and a moulded surround. The outer bays contain Venetian windows in both floors, and at the rear is a doorway with a four-centred arched initialled and dated lintel, and a mullioned window.	II
Barn east of Townend Farmhouse; 53.22433°N 1.83530°W		18th century	The barn is in limestone with chamfered quoins, and a stone slate roof with coped gables and moulded kneelers. There are two storeys and three bays. The barn contains a segmental-headed cart entrance, doorways and windows with chamfered quoined surrounds and keystones, vents, and a circular opening with four keystones.	II
