= Listed buildings in Offerton, Derbyshire =

Offerton is a civil parish in the Derbyshire Dales district of Derbyshire, England. The parish contains six listed buildings that are recorded in the National Heritage List for England. Of these, one is listed at Grade II*, the middle of the three grades, and the others are at Grade II, the lowest grade. The parish is almost entirely rural, and the listed buildings consist of houses, farmhouses and farm buildings.

== Key ==
Grade	Criteria
II*	Particularly important buildings of more than special interest
II	Buildings of national importance and special interest

== Buildings ==
Name and location	Photograph	Date	Notes	Grade
Offerton Hall; 53.32596°N 1.68019°W		Late 16th century	A small manor house dating mainly from 1658, it is in gritstone with quoins, and a stone slate roof with coped gables and moulded kneelers. There are two storeys and attics, and a U-shaped plan with a central range and projecting gabled wings, and a gabled stair tower at the rear. At the angle of the main range and the southwest wing is a two-storey lean-to porch, and a doorway with a quoined surround and a hood mould, above which is a datestone. Most of the windows are mullioned, some with hood moulds.	II*
Nether House and outbuilding 53.32774°N 1.68156°W		Late 16th century	The farmhouse, later a private house, was remodelled in about 1700. It is in gritstone with quoins, and a roof of Welsh slate and tile with coped gables and moulded kneelers. There are two storeys, and an irregular T-shaped plan, with a front of four bays and a rear wing. The doorway has a quoined surround, a deep lintel and a bracketed hood. Above the doorway is a circular window in a square surround, and the other windows are mullioned. The rear wing has a doorway with a chamfered quoined surround and a Tudor-arched lintel, and the outbuilding contains two doorways, one a loft door.	II
Outbuildings, Offerton Hall; 53.32624°N 1.68065°W		1592	The farm buildings to the northwest of the hall are in gritstone with quoins and a stone slate roof. They have an L-shaped plan, with two ranges at right angles, both with a single storey. The northeast range has six bays with five cruck trusses, and the openings include two mullioned windows, and other openings have cambered heads. The southwest range contains a segmental archway and doorway with quoined surrounds.	II
Garner House and barn 53.33465°N 1.69409°W		17th century	The farmhouse and attached barn are in gritstone with quoins, and a roof of Welsh slate and stone slate with a coped gable and moulded kneelers, and two storeys. The house has an irregular plan, a front of three bays and a wing on the front. The windows are mullioned, with some mullions removed. At the rear are two gabled projections and a semicircular stair tower. The barn has three bays and contains a full height doorway with a quoined surround, slit vents, and two overloft openings.	II
Offerton House; 53.32630°N 1.68155°W		17th century	The house is in gritstone with quoins, and a stone slate roof with coped gables and moulded kneelers. There is an irregular plan, the main range having triple gabled projections to the north, and an elongated range extending northwards from the west end. The south front has two storeys, four bays, the west end bay gabled, and with a gablet over the doorway, which has a massive lintel and a hood mould. The windows are mullioned, some with hood moulds. In the rear wing is a cart entry with a segmental arch.	II
Outbuilding, Nether House; 53.32791°N 1.68119°W		Late 18th century	The outbuilding is in gritstone with quoins, and a tile roof with a coped gable and moulded kneelers to the southwest. There are two storeys and four bays. The building contains three doorways with quoined surrounds, a segmental-arched cart entry and a circular pitching hole.	II
