= Scheduled monuments in Bolsover =

Protected historic sites in Bolsover, Derbyshire, England

This is a list of scheduled monuments in the district of Bolsover in the English county of Derbyshire.

In the United Kingdom, a scheduled monument is a "nationally important" archaeological site or historic building that has been given protection against unauthorised change by being placed on a list (or "schedule") by the Secretary of State for Culture, Media and Sport; English Heritage takes the leading role in identifying such sites. Scheduled monuments are defined in the Ancient Monuments and Archaeological Areas Act 1979 and the National Heritage Act 1983. There are about 20,000 scheduled monument entries on the list, which is maintained by English Heritage; more than one site can be included in a single entry.

While a scheduled monument can also be recognised as a listed building, English Heritage considers listed building status as a better way of protecting buildings than scheduled monument status. If a monument is considered by English Heritage to "no longer merit scheduling" it can be descheduled.

Derbyshire has over 500 scheduled monuments including many stone cairns, stone circles, barrow burial mounds, lead mining relics, ancient settlements, and over 20 bridges.

Image	Name and reference	Feature	Location	Notes
	Ash Tree Cave	Cave	Whitwell; SK5148576144	Excavations conducted since 1934 have discovered artefacts from the Palaeolithic, Mesolithic, Neolithic, Bronze Age, Iron Age and Roman times. North of Hollin Hill, 2 miles NW of Creswell Crags
	Bolsover Castle	Castle	Old Bolsover, Bolsover; SK47007070	Also a Grade I listed building. Early 17th-century castle, built on the earthworks and ruins of the 12th-century tower keep castle and 11th-century motte-and-bailey castle. The first structure of the present castle was built between 1612 and 1617 by Sir Charles Cavendish.
Mother Grundy's Parlour Cave	Creswell Gorge Palaeolithic and later prehistoric sites, including Pinhole Cave, Mother Grundy's Parlour and Robin Hood's Cave	Settlement	Whitwell; SK5354474219	Creswell Crags is a limestone gorge on the border between Derbyshire and Nottinghamshire, near the villages of Creswell and Whitwell. The cliffs in the ravine contain several caves that were occupied during the last ice age, between around 43,000 and 10,000 years ago. Its caves contain the northernmost cave art in Europe.
Boat House Cave	Creswell Gorge Palaeolithic and later prehistoric sites, including Boat House Cave and Church Hole Cave	Settlement	Whitwell; SK5354474219	See above
	Four watchtowers SW of town	Defences	Old Bolsover; SK4716470441	
	Hardwick Old Hall	House	Ault Hucknall; SK4617363660	The substantial ruins of Hardwick Old Hall, an Elizabethan great house. The Old Hall building mostly dates from 1587 until 1597, when Bess of Hardwick relocated to the newly built Hardwick New Hall (only 200m away). Also a Grade I listed building. c.14 km SE of Chesterfield
	Langwith Cave	Cave	Scarcliffe; SK5179969497	A round chamber approximately 6m across accessed by several passages. Excavations from 1903 to 1927 found Neolithic remains (from a human burial and a child's skull) as well as Palaeolithic remains (flint instruments, reindeer bones, woolly rhinoceros bones and a number of hearths).
	Markland Grips promontory fort	Fort	Elmton; SK5090875043	
	Medieval town defences	Defences	Old Bolsover; SK4733970825	183m SE of church of St Mary and St Lawrence and 335m NE of Bolsover Castle
	Pinxton Castle, motte and fortified manor with moated site and five fishponds	Castle	Pinxton/South Normanton; SK4595456881	"Pinxton Castle, or sometimes Wynn Castle, includes the motte of a 12th century earthwork castle and a later medieval fortified manor. Remains include a moated site and five fishponds along with a range of perimeter earthworks."
	Pleasley Colliery	Mining	Pleasley; SK4986164354	A former coal mine since the 1870s and produced coal until 1983. Rare and only surviving pithead arrangement in the UK of two steam engines in the same engine house between two mine shafts. The enginehouse, chimney and headstocks also constitute a Grade II listed building.
	Stainsby defended manorial complex including site of chapel	Settlement	Ault Hucknall; SK4490965638	
	Standing cross	Cross	Barlborough; SK4761577275	Also a Grade II* listed building.
	Standing cross, Clowne	Cross	Clowne; SK4915075434	

== See also ==
- Scheduled monuments in Derbyshire
  - Scheduled monuments in Amber Valley
  - Scheduled monuments in Chesterfield
  - Scheduled monuments in Derby
  - Scheduled monuments in Derbyshire Dales
  - Scheduled monuments in the Borough of Erewash
  - Scheduled monuments in High Peak
  - Scheduled monuments in North East Derbyshire
  - Scheduled monuments in South Derbyshire
- Grade I listed buildings in Derbyshire
- Grade II* listed buildings in Bolsover (district)
