= Scheduled monuments in Derbyshire =

List of protected ancient monuments in Derbyshire, England

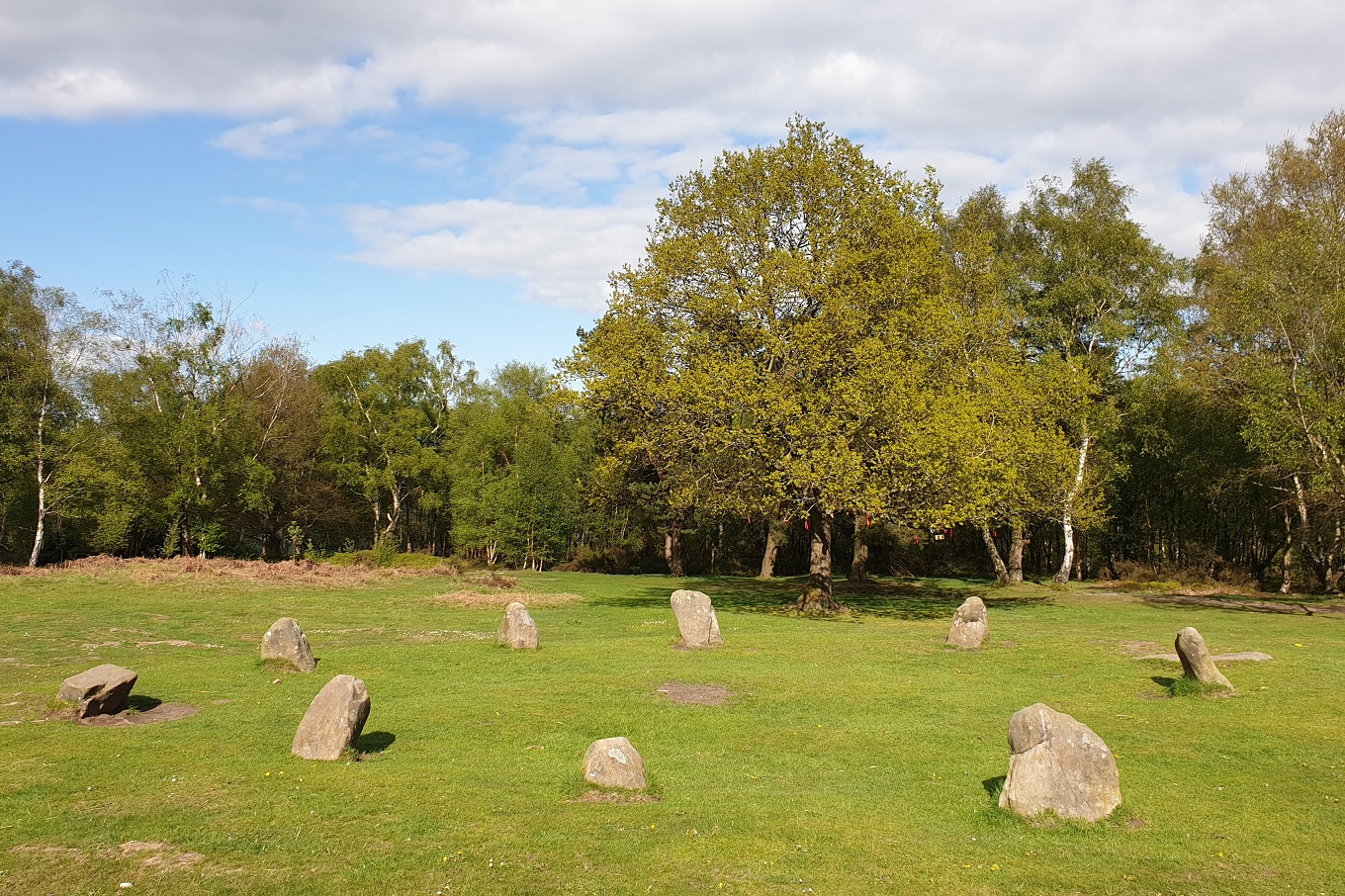
Nine Ladies stone circle, a scheduled monument in the Derbyshire Dales district

There are over 500 scheduled monuments in the English county of Derbyshire.

In the United Kingdom, a scheduled monument is a "nationally important" archaeological site or historic building that has been given protection against unauthorised change by being placed on a list (or "schedule") by the Secretary of State for Culture, Media and Sport; English Heritage takes the leading role in identifying such sites. Scheduled monuments are defined in the Ancient Monuments and Archaeological Areas Act 1979 and the National Heritage Act 1983. They are also referred to as scheduled ancient monuments. There are about 20,000 Scheduled Monument entries on the list, which is maintained by English Heritage; more than one site can be included in a single entry.

While a scheduled monument can also be recognised as a listed building, English Heritage considers listed building status as a better way of protecting buildings than scheduled monument status. If a monument is considered by English Heritage to "no longer merit scheduling" it can be descheduled.

Derbyshire's scheduled monuments include many stone cairns, stone circles, barrow burial mounds, lead mining relics, ancient settlements, and more than 20 bridges.

As there are over 500 scheduled monuments in the county they have been split into separate lists for each district.

- Scheduled monuments in Amber Valley
- Scheduled monuments in Bolsover
- Scheduled monuments in Chesterfield
- Scheduled monuments in Derby
- Scheduled monuments in Derbyshire Dales
- Scheduled monuments in the Borough of Erewash
- Scheduled monuments in High Peak
- Scheduled monuments in North East Derbyshire
- Scheduled monuments in South Derbyshire

== See also ==
- Grade I listed buildings in Derbyshire
- Grade II* listed buildings in Derbyshire
