= Scheduled monuments in North East Derbyshire =

This is a list of scheduled monuments in the district of North East Derbyshire in the English county of Derbyshire.

In the United Kingdom, a scheduled monument is a "nationally important" archaeological site or historic building that has been given protection against unauthorised change by being placed on a list (or "schedule") by the Secretary of State for Culture, Media and Sport; English Heritage takes the leading role in identifying such sites. Scheduled monuments are defined in the Ancient Monuments and Archaeological Areas Act 1979 and the National Heritage Act 1983. There are about 20,000 scheduled monument entries on the list, which is maintained by English Heritage; more than one site can be included in a single entry.

While a scheduled monument can also be recognised as a listed building, English Heritage considers listed building status as a better way of protecting buildings than scheduled monument status. If a monument is considered by English Heritage to "no longer merit scheduling" it can be descheduled.

Derbyshire has over 500 scheduled monuments including many stone cairns, stone circles, barrow burial mounds, lead mining relics, ancient settlements, and over 20 bridges.

== List ==
Image	Name and reference	Feature	Location	Notes
	Bowl barrow on Longside Moor	Barrow	Holymoorside and Walton; SK3130168444	450m north of Harewood Grange
	Cairn complex near Dalebrook House	Cairns	Brampton; SK2919670775	780m south of Dalebrook House
	3 Cairnfields near Ramsley Lodge	Cairns	Holmesfield; SK2841775207; SK2841775207; SK2841775207	180m NE, 400m NE and 860m NE of Ramsley Lodge
	Cairnfield near Saltersitch Bridge	Cairns	Holmesfield; SK2887578237	320m North of Saltersitch Bridge, Eastern Moors
	Cairnfield near Syda Farm	Cairns	Holymoorside and Walton; SK3144968812	390m South of Syda Farm
	Cairnfield near Moor Edge Farm	Cairns	Holmesfield; SK2895578700	615m West of Moor Edge Farm
	Cairnfield near Nether Rodknoll Farm	Cairns	Brampton; SK2963369958	800m West of Nether Rodknoll Farm
	Cairnfield and embanked stone circle	Cairns	Holmesfield; SK2843277268	550m East of Barbrook Reservoir
	Cairnfield and field system	Cairns	Brampton; SK2926771013	530m South of Dalebrook House
	Cairnfield, linear clearance and ring cairn	Cairns	Holmesfield; SK2890179059	720m NW of Moor Edge Farm
	Castle Hill motte and bailey castle	Castle	Holmesfield; SK3188577640	
	Coke ovens	Metalworks	Dronfield; SK3690578145	120m NE of Summerley House
	Holmesfield moated site and headland	Moated site	Holmesfield; SK3217277945	
	Lead smelt mill in Linacre Wood	Metalworks	Brampton; SK3399572490	160m East of Lower Linacre Reservoir dam
	Lead smelting site on Ramsley Moor	Metalworks	Holmesfield; SK2940075635	600m SW of Foxlane Farm
Seldom Seen Engine House	Plumbley Colliery including Seldom Seen engine house	Mining	Eckington; SK4208579944	600m NE of Roundhill Cottages
	Red lead mill, lead smelt mill, and corn mill	Metalworks	Holymoorside and Walton; SK3257369394	East of Nether Loads Farm
	Ring cairn and cairn on Ramsley Moor	Cairns	Holmesfield; SK2894775634	850m NE of Ramsley Lodge
	Rodknoll fancy barrow	Barrow	Brampton; SK3018169851	
	Ruins of Trinity Chapel	Chapel	Brackenfield; SK3586059339	Also a Grade II listed building.
	Section of Rykneld Street Roman road	Road	Wingerworth; SK3926366563	70m long, North of Redleadmill Brook
	Section of Rykneld Street Roman road	Road	Tupton; SK3908465044	220m NE of Pear Tree Farm
	Stone Edge smelt mill at Moss Farm	Metalworks	Ashover; SK3348066978	
	Sutton Scarsdale Hall	House	Sutton cum Duckmanton; SK4422968940	A Georgian ruined stately home in Sutton Scarsdale, just outside Chesterfield. The existing structure is believed to be the fourth or fifth built on the site. In 1724, Nicholas Leke, 4th Earl of Scarsdale commissioned the building of a design by architect Francis Smith. Also a Grade I listed building.
	Tramway embankment	Embankment	Eckington; SK4373079378	
	Waymarker and clapper bridge	Bridge	Holmesfield; SK2758778121	130m South of Barbrook Bridge
	Wayside and boundary cross known as Lady's Cross	Cross	Holmesfield; SK2714778233	
	Wayside cross in Shillito Wood	Cross	Holmesfield; SK2949874878	
	Wayside cross west of Fox Lane	Cross	Holmesfield; SK2954575311	
	Wayside cross west of Saltersitch Bridge	Cross	Holmesfield; SK2863477901	

== See also ==
- Scheduled monuments in Derbyshire
  - Scheduled monuments in Amber Valley
  - Scheduled monuments in Bolsover
  - Scheduled monuments in Chesterfield
  - Scheduled monuments in Derby
  - Scheduled monuments in Derbyshire Dales
  - Scheduled monuments in the Borough of Erewash
  - Scheduled monuments in High Peak
  - Scheduled monuments in South Derbyshire
- Grade I listed buildings in Derbyshire
- Grade II* listed buildings in North East Derbyshire
