= Scheduled monuments in the Borough of Erewash =

This is a list of scheduled monuments in the Borough of Erewash in the English county of Derbyshire.

In the United Kingdom, a scheduled monument is a "nationally important" archaeological site or historic building that has been given protection against unauthorised change by being placed on a list (or "schedule") by the Secretary of State for Culture, Media and Sport; English Heritage takes the leading role in identifying such sites. Scheduled monuments are defined in the Ancient Monuments and Archaeological Areas Act 1979 and the National Heritage Act 1983. There are about 20,000 scheduled monument entries on the list, which is maintained by English Heritage; more than one site can be included in a single entry.

While a scheduled monument can also be recognised as a listed building, English Heritage considers listed building status as a better way of protecting buildings than scheduled monument status. If a monument is considered by English Heritage to "no longer merit scheduling" it can be descheduled.

Derbyshire has over 500 scheduled monuments including many stone cairns, stone circles, barrow burial mounds, lead mining relics, ancient settlements, and over 20 bridges.

Image	Name and reference	Feature	Location	Notes
	Dale Abbey	Abbey	Dale Abbey; SK4362638778	The Augustinian canons moved to Dale Abbey in 1162 from their previous home at Calke Abbey. The remains comprise a 40-foot-high chancel window. Excavations have shown the church to have possessed transepts 100 feet in length, a crossing tower, a cloister 85 feet square and a nave of unknown length.
	Hermitage at Dale Abbey	Cave	Dale Abbey; SK4388438490	A hermit's cave (hermitage) cut into the rock, apparently by a baker from Derby in the 12th century. 170m SE of All Saints Church
	Lock up and pinfold	Enclosure	Sandiacre; SK4794837074	
	Medieval iron working remains at Stanley monastic grange	Metalworks	Stanley and Stanley Common; SK4257240654	
	Moated site and two fishponds at Moat Wood	Moated site	West Hallam; SK4386840518	
	Motte, South West of Morley House Farm	Fort	Morley; SK3918640998	
	Roman fort	Fort	Sawley; SK4750731351	180m East of All Saints' Church

== See also ==
- Scheduled monuments in Derbyshire
  - Scheduled monuments in Amber Valley
  - Scheduled monuments in Bolsover
  - Scheduled monuments in Chesterfield
  - Scheduled monuments in Derby
  - Scheduled monuments in Derbyshire Dales
  - Scheduled monuments in High Peak
  - Scheduled monuments in North East Derbyshire
  - Scheduled monuments in South Derbyshire
- Grade I listed buildings in Derbyshire
- Grade II* listed buildings in Erewash
