= Scheduled monuments in Chesterfield =

Protected historic sites in Chesterfield, Derbyshire, England

This is a list of scheduled monuments in the Borough of Chesterfield in the English county of Derbyshire.

In the United Kingdom, a scheduled monument is a "nationally important" archaeological site or historic building that has been given protection against unauthorised change by being placed on a list (or "schedule") by the Secretary of State for Culture, Media and Sport; English Heritage takes the leading role in identifying such sites. Scheduled monuments are defined in the Ancient Monuments and Archaeological Areas Act 1979 and the National Heritage Act 1983. There are about 20,000 scheduled monument entries on the list, which is maintained by English Heritage; more than one site can be included in a single entry.

While a scheduled monument can also be recognised as a listed building, English Heritage considers listed building status as a better way of protecting buildings than scheduled monument status. If a monument is considered by English Heritage to "no longer merit scheduling" it can be descheduled.

Derbyshire has over 500 scheduled monuments including many stone cairns, stone circles, barrow burial mounds, lead mining relics, ancient settlements, and over 20 bridges.

Image	Name and reference	Feature	Location	Notes
	Brampton Barn	Barn	Brampton; SK3638471155	Late 16th/early 17th-century barn with large cruck trusses supporting a stone and slate roof. Also a Grade II listed building.
	Tapton Castle motte	Castle	Chesterfield; SK3916272140	

== See also ==
- Scheduled monuments in Derbyshire
  - Scheduled monuments in Amber Valley
  - Scheduled monuments in Bolsover
  - Scheduled monuments in Derby
  - Scheduled monuments in Derbyshire Dales
  - Scheduled monuments in the Borough of Erewash
  - Scheduled monuments in High Peak
  - Scheduled monuments in North East Derbyshire
  - Scheduled monuments in South Derbyshire
- Grade I listed buildings in Derbyshire
- Grade II* listed buildings in Chesterfield
