= Scheduled monuments in Amber Valley =

Protected historic sites in Amber Valley, Derbyshire, England

This is a list of scheduled monuments in the district of Amber Valley in the English county of Derbyshire.

In the United Kingdom, a scheduled monument is a "nationally important" archaeological site or historic building that has been given protection against unauthorised change by being placed on a list (or "schedule") by the Secretary of State for Culture, Media and Sport; English Heritage takes the leading role in identifying such sites. Scheduled monuments are defined in the Ancient Monuments and Archaeological Areas Act 1979 and the National Heritage Act 1983. There are about 20,000 scheduled monument entries on the list, which is maintained by English Heritage; more than one site can be included in a single entry.

While a scheduled monument can also be recognised as a listed building, English Heritage considers listed building status as a better way of protecting buildings than scheduled monument status. If a monument is considered by English Heritage to "no longer merit scheduling" it can be descheduled.

Derbyshire has over 500 scheduled monuments including many stone cairns, stone circles, barrow burial mounds, lead mining relics, ancient settlements, and over 20 bridges.

== List ==
Image	Name and reference	Feature	Location	Notes
	Alderwasley Chapel	Chapel	Alderwasley; SK32385342	Also a Grade II listed building. Built in the early 16th century by the Lord of the Manor, Thomas Lowe. In c. 1850 church services moved from St Margaret's Chapel to the newly built All Saints' Church.
	Aqueduct (Cromford Canal over Derby to Matlock railway)	Aqueduct	Dethick, Lea and Holloway; SK3197455553	328m south-east of Aqueduct Cottage
	Butterley Works blast furnace complex	Metalworks	Butterley near Ripley; SK4016251586	The blast furnaces, canal tunnel and underground wharf date back to the 1790s.
	Castle Hill camp	Settlement	South Wingfield; SK3857954129	
	Codnor Castle	Castle	Codnor, Ripley; SK4335849983	A ruined 13th-century castle built by Henry de Grey.
	Duffield Bridge	Bridge	Duffield; SK3503442965	Also a Grade II listed building.
	Fritchley Tunnel, Butterley Gangroad	Tunnel	Crich; SK3585553013	Fritchley Tunnel is a disused railway tunnel, which is believed to be the oldest surviving example in the world. The tunnel was constructed in 1793 by Benjamin Outram as part of the Butterley Gangroad.
	Horsley Castle tower keep castle	Castle	Horsley; SK3758043204	
Mackworth Castle gatehouse	Mackworth medieval settlement including the castle gatehouse, part of the medieval open field system and a pinfold	Settlement	Mackworth; SK3123837783	Mackworth Castle was a 14th- or 15th-century structure in Mackworth village near Derby. It was the home of the Mackworth family for several centuries. The gatehouse is a Grade I listed building.
	Moated site in Mapperley Park Wood	Moated site	Mapperley; SK4334242533	
	Moated site north of Dannah Farm	Moated site	Shottle and Postern; SK3117650474	
	Morley Park Works	Metalworks	Ripley; SK3800249189	
	Mugginton medieval settlement	Settlement	Weston Underwood; SK2829543091	Includes part of an open field system.
	Park Hall moated site, well and enclosure	Moated site	Mapperley; SK4246043013	
	Section of Roman road, Kirk Langley	Road	Kirk Langley; SK2914537946	North-east of Moor Lane, Kirk Langley
	Section of Rykneld Street Roman road	Road	Denby; SK3872346272	South of Ticknall Hill
	Twelfth century tower keep castle	Castle	Duffield; SK3431644044	Includes sites of 11th-century motte and bailey castle, an Anglian cemetery and a Romano-British settlement
	Windley Moated Manorial Complex	Moated site	Farnah Hall, Windley; SK3238643629	
	Wingfield Manor: a medieval great house	House	South Wingfield; SK3742454736	Construction of Wingfield Manor began in 1441 (for Treasurer to Henry VI, Sir Ralph Cromwell) but has been left deserted since the 1770s. Also a Grade I listed building.

== See also ==
- Scheduled monuments in Derbyshire
  - Scheduled monuments in Bolsover
  - Scheduled monuments in Chesterfield
  - Scheduled monuments in Derby
  - Scheduled monuments in Derbyshire Dales
  - Scheduled monuments in the Borough of Erewash
  - Scheduled monuments in High Peak
  - Scheduled monuments in North East Derbyshire
  - Scheduled monuments in South Derbyshire
- Grade I listed buildings in Derbyshire
- Grade II* listed buildings in Amber Valley
