= Listed buildings in Hungry Bentley =

Hungry Bentley is a civil parish in the Derbyshire Dales district of Derbyshire, England. The parish contains two listed buildings that are recorded in the National Heritage List for England. Of these, one is listed at Grade II*, the middle of the three grades, and the other is at Grade II, the lowest grade. The parish, which contains a deserted medieval village, is entirely rural, and the listed buildings consist of a house, and a farmhouse with an attached outbuilding

== Key ==
Grade	Criteria
II*	Particularly important buildings of more than special interest
II	Buildings of national importance and special interest

== Buildings ==
Name and location	Photograph	Date	Notes	Grade
Bentley Hall; 52.94010°N 1.73711°W	—	Early 17th century	The house, which was later altered and extended, is in red brick with stone dressings, on a plinth, with quoins, and a tile roof, hipped on the west wing. There is an L-shaped plan, consisting of a projecting gabled 17th-century range with two storeys and attics and three bays, and an 18th-century west wing with two storeys and three bays. The earlier range has continuous moulded hood moulds and a dentilled eaves band. In the centre of the north front is a two-storey canted porch, the ground floor open on two banded columns with moulded capitals and a moulded cornice, over which is a bay window with rusticated quoins, and a pierced balcony of cusped circles. The outer bays contain mullioned and transomed windows. On the south front is a bay window with Corinthian pilasters, an entablature, a moulded segmental pediment, and a swagged urn finial.	II*
Bentley Fields Farmhouse and outbuilding 52.94529°N 1.73174°W	—	17th century	The farmhouse and outbuilding are in brick, the farm building with a sawtooth eaves cornice, the outbuilding with stone dressings and quoins, and both with tile roofs. The farmhouse has two storeys and attics and two bays, and a two-storey two-bay extension to the west. It contains a doorway with a moulded surround, the windows are casements with segmental heads, and there are two gabled dormers. At the rear is a staircase tower. The older part has a brick plinth with chamfered stone copings, a moulded string course, mullioned windows, and an inserted segment-headed arch.	II
