= Scheduled monuments in Derby =

List of protected ancient monuments in Derby, England

This is a list of scheduled monuments in the City of Derby unitary authority in the English county of Derbyshire.

In the United Kingdom, a scheduled monument is a "nationally important" archaeological site or historic building that has been given protection against unauthorised change by being placed on a list (or "schedule") by the Secretary of State for Culture, Media and Sport; English Heritage takes the leading role in identifying such sites. Scheduled monuments are defined in the Ancient Monuments and Archaeological Areas Act 1979 and the National Heritage Act 1983. There are about 20,000 scheduled monument entries on the list, which is maintained by English Heritage; more than one site can be included in a single entry.

While a scheduled monument can also be recognised as a listed building, English Heritage considers listed building status as a better way of protecting buildings than scheduled monument status. If a monument is considered by English Heritage to "no longer merit scheduling" it can be descheduled.

Derbyshire has over 500 scheduled monuments including many stone cairns, stone circles, barrow burial mounds, lead mining relics, ancient settlements, and over 20 bridges.

Image	Name and reference	Feature	Location	Notes
	Anglo-Scandinavian high cross shaft in the churchyard of St Werburgh's Church	Cross	Spondon SK 39796 35920	The remaining limestone shaft of the high cross dates back 9th century. The original cross head is missing.
The Abbey Pub	Darley Abbey	Church	Darley Abbey SK 35257 38411	Remains of Augustinian abbey, which was founded by Robert de Ferrers, 2nd Earl of Derby, in c.1146 and dissolved in 1538. The only building still standing was a hall house, and it is now The Abbey pub.
	Derby Racecourse Roman vicus and cemetery	Settlement	Derby SK 36233 37518	Roman civilian settlement on the Roman road between the Roman fort at Little Chester (Derventio) and the River Trent at Sawley.
	Littlechester Roman site	Settlement	Derby SK 35311 37535	The site of Derventio Coritanorum Roman fort. Much of the original Roman site is now beneath modern housing development and gardens.
	Roman bath house at Parker's Piece	Building	Derby SK 35292 37327	Buried remains of the bath house were discovered in 1924, close to the Roman fort of Derventio.
	Rykneld Street Roman road and remains of Bronze Age cemetery	Road	Littleover SK 32485 34156	Short section of the Roman road between Wall at Litchfield and the nearby fort at Derventio.
	St Mary's Bridge	Bridge	Derby SK 35379 36767	St Mary's Bridge was built in 1788-93 by Thomas Harrison. A medieval bridge which was demolished to make way for it. It has three arches and spans the River Derwent.

== See also ==
- Scheduled monuments in Derbyshire
  - Scheduled monuments in Amber Valley
  - Scheduled monuments in Bolsover
  - Scheduled monuments in Chesterfield
  - Scheduled monuments in Derbyshire Dales
  - Scheduled monuments in the Borough of Erewash
  - Scheduled monuments in High Peak
  - Scheduled monuments in North East Derbyshire
  - Scheduled monuments in South Derbyshire
- Grade I listed buildings in Derbyshire
- Grade II* listed buildings in Derby
