= Listed buildings in Alkmonton =

Alkmonton is a civil parish in the Derbyshire Dales district of Derbyshire, England. The parish contains five listed buildings that are recorded in the National Heritage List for England. All the listed buildings are designated at Grade II, the lowest of the three grades, which is applied to "buildings of national importance and special interest". The parish contains the village of Alkmonton and the surrounding countryside. The listed buildings consist of two farmhouses, a church, a former school and schoolmaster's house, and a cast iron pump.

== Buildings ==
Name and location	Photograph	Date	Notes
Tophouse Farmhouse; 52.93975°N 1.72022°W	—	Late 17th century	The farmhouse is in painted brick with painted stone dressings, a floor band, and a tile roof with moulded stone gable copings. There are two storeys and attics, and three bays. On the front is a latticed porch, and a blocked segmental-headed doorway, and the windows are sashes.
Alkmonton Old Hall; 52.93333°N 1.71387°W		Mid 18th century	A farmhouse in red brick with brick dressings, a floor band, and a tile roof. There are two storeys and attics, and four bays. On the front is a gabled porch and a semicircular-headed doorway with a fanlight. The windows are cross windows with segmental heads containing casements.
St John's Church; 52.94395°N 1.72296°W		1848	The church, which is in Early English style, was restored and extended in 1878. It is built in flint pebbles and has a tile roof with stone coped gables. The church consists of a nave, a south porch, a lower chancel, a north vestry and a west octagonal bellcote with a leaded spire. The windows are lancets with hood moulds.
The Old School House and wall 52.94383°N 1.72348°W		1856	A school and master's house, later a private house, it is in red brick with brick dressings, overhanging eaves, and a tile roof. There is a T-shaped plan, with the single-storey two-bay former school and the two-storey two-bay house at right angles. On the gable of the school is a timber bellcote and below is a clock face. The house has a gabled porch and a doorway with a cambered head, and the windows in both parts are casements with cambered heads. To the north and west of the house is a brick garden wall with triangular copings.
Pump opposite the School House; 52.94373°N 1.72357°W	—	Late 19th century	The pump is in cast iron with a stone trough. It has a banded stem with a fluted top and nozzle, and a wavy handle on the right side.
