= Castleton Town defences =

Scheduled monument in Derbyshire, England

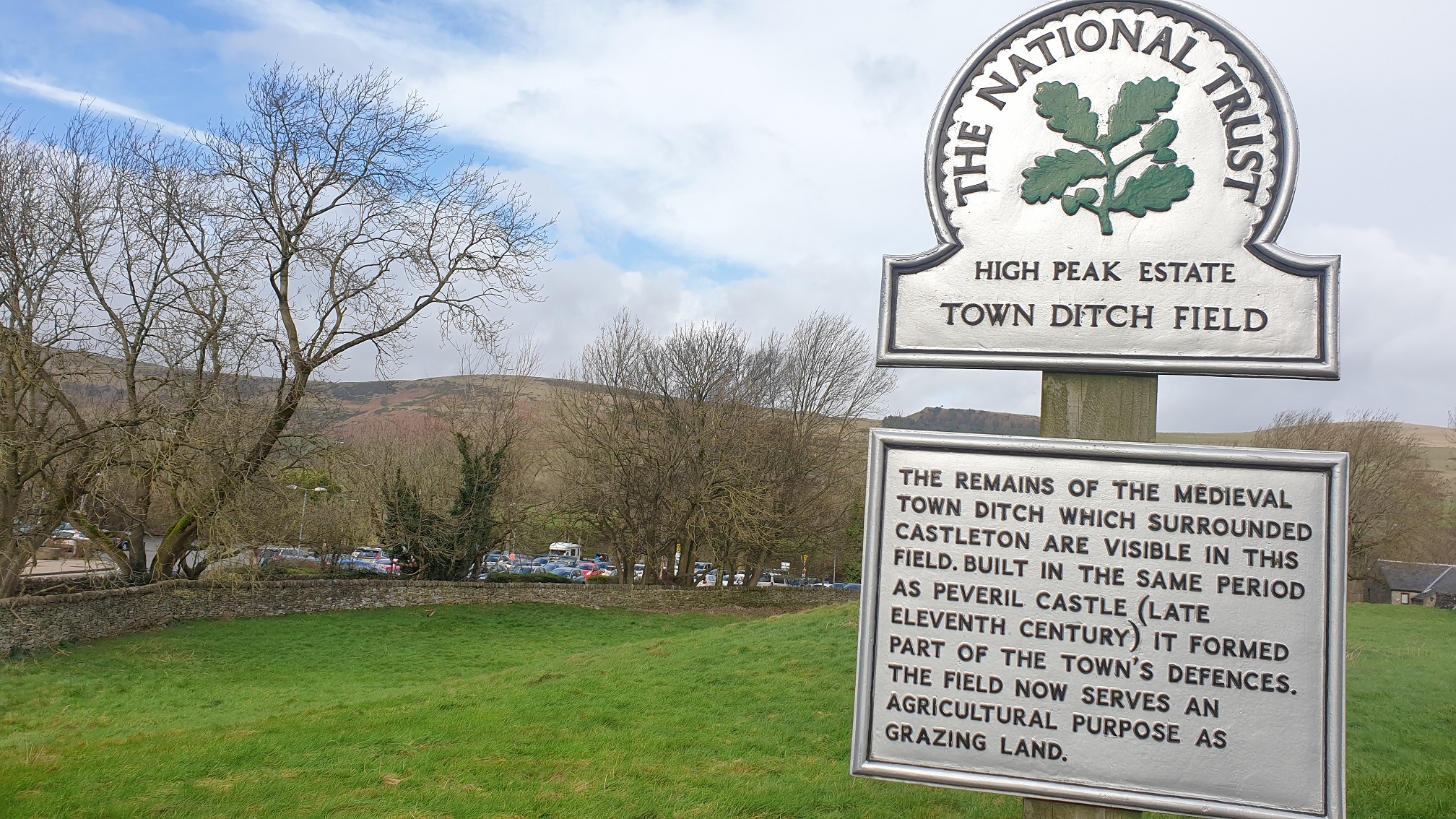
- Interactive map of Castleton Town defences
- 53°20′36″N 1°46′37″W
- Periods: late Middle Ages
- Location: Castleton
- Region: Derbyshire, England

Scheduled monument
- Official name: Town defences 270m north and 350m north east of Peveril Castle
- Designated: 15 February 1999
- Reference no.: 1018868

The Castleton town defences in Castleton, Derbyshire, consist of a ditch and bank constructed during the 1190s. The ditch was part of Peveril Castle's medieval defence system.

The town defences were classified as a scheduled monument on 15 February 1999.

== See also ==
- Scheduled monuments in High Peak
