= Alkmonton =

Village in the Derbyshire Dales, England

Coordinates: 52.93°N 01.73°W

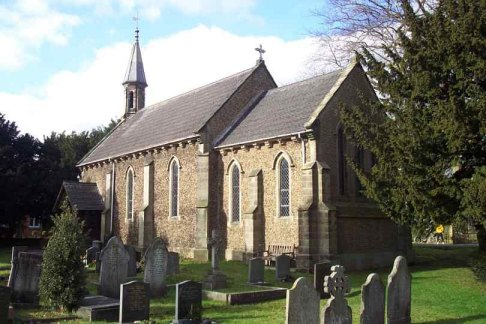
- St. John's church

- Alkmonton parish highlighted within Derbyshire
- OS grid reference: SK1838
- Shire county: Derbyshire
- Region: East Midlands
- Country: England
- Sovereign state: United Kingdom
- Post town: Ashbourne
- Postcode district: DE6
- Police: Derbyshire
- Fire: Derbyshire
- Ambulance: East Midlands

Alkmonton is a village and civil parish in the Derbyshire Dales district of Derbyshire, England, roughly between Uttoxeter and Derby. The parish had a population of 75 at the 2001 census and it remained less than 100 in 2011. Details are included in the civil parish of Cubley, Derbyshire.

== History ==
The village's name is derived from the Old English for "Ealhmund's settlement". Alkmonton was mentioned in the Domesday Book as belonging to Henry de Ferrers and was worth forty shillings.

Wulfgeat had 1½ carucates of land to the geld. There is land for two ploughs. There are now two ploughs in Demesne; and 8 Villans and 7 Bordars having two ploughs, and 12 acres of meadow. There is woodland pasture 1 league long and a half broad. TRE worth 60s now 40s. Ralph holds it.

In about 1100 a hospital for female lepers was founded between Alkmonton and Hungry Bentley by Robert de Bakepuze. It went into decline but was re-founded in 1406, only to be abolished in 1547 due to the reformation. The ownership of the manor of Alkmonton passed through several families to the Evans, who in 1843 built the parish church of St John (a Grade II listed building).

The earthworks of the medieval village of Alkmonton are a short distance south of the present village.

== See also ==
- Listed buildings in Alkmonton
