= Alkmonton medieval settlement =

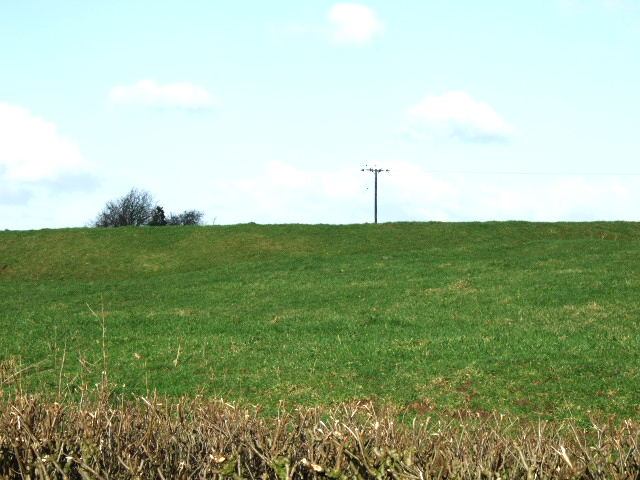
- The earthworks, viewed from the south

- Location within Derbyshire
- 52°56′8″N 1°42′46″W
- Location: Alkmonton, Derbyshire
- OS grid reference: SK 194 376

Scheduled monument
- Designated: 25 February 1971
- Reference no.: 1018617

Alkmonton medieval settlement is an archaeological site, a deserted medieval village near the present-day village of Alkmonton, about 5 miles (8 km) south of Ashbourne in Derbyshire, England. It is a Scheduled Monument.

== History ==
Alkmonton is mentioned in the Domesday Book of 1086, as Alchementune; it was held under Henry de Ferrers. There were 8 villagers and 7 smallholders. In 1332 the tax quota was comparable to its neighbours.

In about 1100, when the manor was held by Robert de Bakepuze, a hospital for female lepers was built, dedicated to Saint Leonard. It was refounded in 1406, leprosy having died out, by the widow of Sir Walter Blount, who held the manor. His descendant Walter Blount, 1st Baron Mountjoy (died 1474) willed that a chapel, dedicated to Saint Nicholas, should be built at Alkmonton, and that the master of the hospital should say Mass there each year on the feast of St Nicholas.

The hospital and chapel were abolished during the reign of Edward VI.

== Earthworks ==
The earthworks, thought to be the entirety of the medieval village, are south of the present-day village of Alkmonton, on a south-west facing slope, next to Alkmonton Old Hall Farm to the south. They are well preserved; there is a village green in the south of the site, and sunken trackways lead away from it. There is a platform, about 25 metres (82 ft) by 50 metres (160 ft), thought to be the site of the medieval chapel. A font, now in St John's Church in Alkmonton, was found near here in 1844. There is a larger platform north of the supposed chapel, about 50 metres (160 ft) by 60 metres (200 ft). There are other features, rectangular enclosures within which are building platforms.

North and east of the site of the village are ridge and furrow patterns, surviving to a height of 0.5 metres (1 ft 8 in), of the medieval open-field system.

== See also ==
- Hungry Bentley, a deserted village nearby
- List of lost settlements in the United Kingdom
