= Chelmorton =

Village in Derbyshire, England

Coordinates: 53.2266°N 1.8330°W

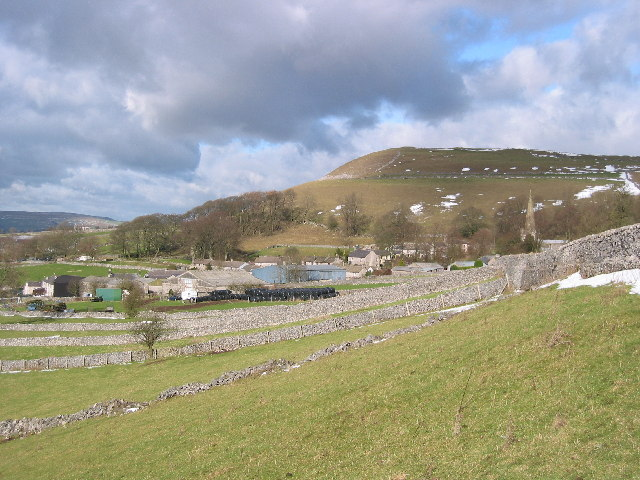
- Chelmorton from Midshires Way

- Location within Derbyshire
- Population: 322 (2011)
- District: Derbyshire Dales
- Shire county: Derbyshire
- Region: East Midlands
- Country: England
- Sovereign state: United Kingdom
- Post town: BUXTON
- Postcode district: SK17
- Dialling code: 01298
- Police: Derbyshire
- Fire: Derbyshire
- Ambulance: East Midlands
- UK Parliament: Derbyshire Dales

Chelmorton is a village and a civil parish in Derbyshire, England. It is in the Derbyshire Dales district and the nearest towns are Buxton to the northwest and Bakewell to the east. The name Chelmorton derives from Old English (a personal name + dūn) and probably means 'Ceolmaer's hill' (or 'Cēolmær's hill'). The population of the civil parish as of the 2011 census was 322.

Chelmorton village lines a long street in a high, shallow basin on a limestone plateau, part of the White Peak area of the Peak District National Park. The village is surrounded by a regular pattern of rectangular fields that are bordered by limestone walls; the layout of these indicates that the village had one or possibly two medieval open fields, before enclosure occurred at a subsequent unspecified time.

In the 12th century the village was known as Chelmerdon(e). The parish church of Saint John the Baptist is 11th century. At the opposite end of the village stands its oldest dwelling, Townend Farm, built originally by Isaiah Buxton in 1634. With its four Venetian windows and pedimented doorway it is also known locally as Chelmorton Hall. This ancestral home and family seat of the Marsden family has an enclosed courtyard with elaborate outbuildings. The Church Inn is at the bottom of Chelmorton Low. Other sites of interest are the Rakes, and the source of the village's traditional water supply, Illy Willy Water.

Children from Chelmorton go to Harpur Hill Primary School, Buxton Community School, Monyash Primary School and Lady Manners School.

== See also ==
- Listed buildings in Chelmorton
