= Beeley =

Village and civil parish in northern Derbyshire, England

Coordinates: 53.2035°N 1.6044°W

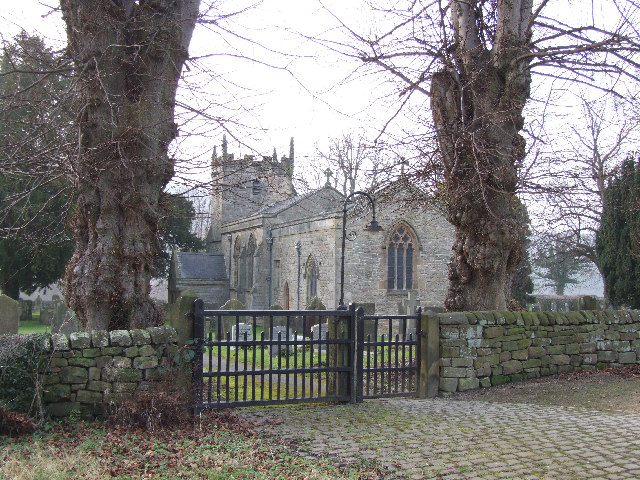
- St Annes Church, Beeley

- Beeley parish highlighted within Derbyshire
- Population: 195 (2011)
- OS grid reference: SK264673
- District: Derbyshire Dales
- Shire county: Derbyshire
- Region: East Midlands
- Country: England
- Sovereign state: United Kingdom
- Post town: MATLOCK
- Postcode district: DE4
- Police: Derbyshire
- Fire: Derbyshire
- Ambulance: East Midlands

Beeley is a village and civil parish in northern Derbyshire, England. Located near Bakewell in the Derbyshire Dales, it is situated on the B6012 road, between Rowsley and Edensor. The civil parish population at the 2011 Census was 195.

It is part of the Peak District National Park, and has been part of the Chatsworth estate since the 18th century, when the Duke of Devonshire bought Beeley Hill Top and then much of the property piecemeal. Beeley Old Hall dates from the 17th century. On School Lane there is an outdoor centre called Dukes Barn.

The Peak District Boundary Walk runs through the village.

== See also ==
- Listed buildings in Beeley
- Pilsley, another Chatsworth estate village
