= Brushfield =

Hamlet and civil parish in Derbyshire, England

Coordinates: 53.240°N 1.764°W

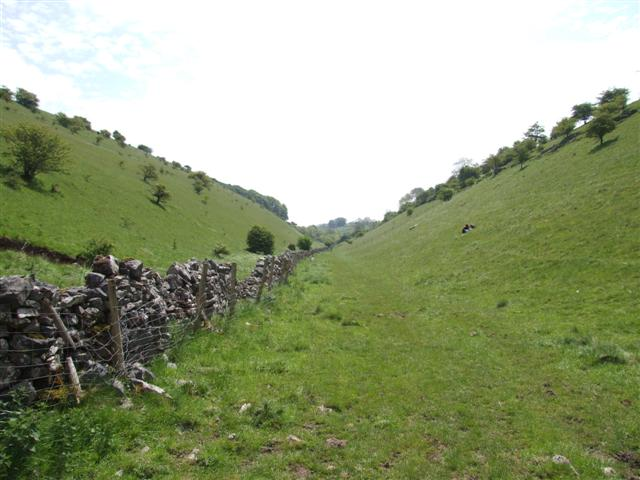
- High Dale, Brushfield.

- Brushfield parish highlighted within Derbyshire
- Population: 13
- OS grid reference: SK158714
- District: Derbyshire Dales
- Shire county: Derbyshire
- Region: East Midlands
- Country: England
- Sovereign state: United Kingdom
- Post town: BUXTON
- Postcode district: SK17
- Police: Derbyshire
- Fire: Derbyshire
- Ambulance: East Midlands

Brushfield is a hamlet and civil parish in the Derbyshire Dales district of Derbyshire, England, in the Peak District National Park. It is about 8 miles east of Buxton. According to the 2001 census it had a population of 13. In 2007 it had just three houses. Several holiday lets are run by two separate families. One of these cottages is called the 'Old School House', a small one-bed house of stone.

There are three scheduled monuments in the parish: bowl barrows at Brushfield Hough and Putwell Hill and High Field hlǣw, a rare pre-Christian burial monument dating from around 600AD.
