= Little Longstone =

Village in Derbyshire, England

Coordinates: 53.243°N 1.715°W

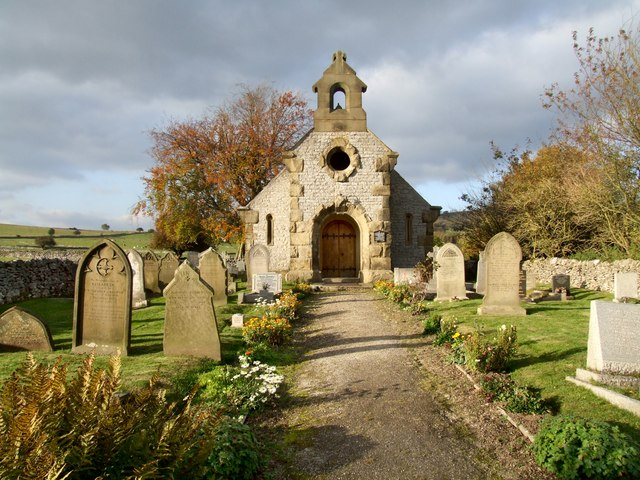
- Little Longstone Congregational Chapel

- Location within Derbyshire
- Population: 103 (2001 census)
- OS grid reference: SK191718
- District: Derbyshire Dales
- Shire county: Derbyshire
- Region: East Midlands
- Country: England
- Sovereign state: United Kingdom
- Post town: BAKEWELL
- Postcode district: DE45
- Dialling code: 01629
- Police: Derbyshire
- Fire: Derbyshire
- Ambulance: East Midlands
- UK Parliament: Derbyshire Dales

Little Longstone is a village and civil parish in the Derbyshire Dales district, in the county of Derbyshire, England. The village is on a minor road west of Great Longstone, just off the B6465 road from Wardlow to Ashford-in-the-Water. There is a Grade-II-listed Congregational Chapel and a public house, the Packhorse Inn, in the village. As in many small parishes, there is no parish council and local democracy is administered via a parish meeting. In 2001 the parish had a population of 103.

The parish includes parts of Monsal Dale and the hamlet of Monsal Head, and lies wholly within the Peak District National Park. The Monsal Trail, a popular cycleway and footpath following a section of the former Manchester, Buxton, Matlock and Midlands Junction Railway, runs just south of the village.

== Listed buildings and scheduled monuments ==
There are nine listed buildings in the parish (all listed at Grade II):

- village stocks and adjacent house
- Manor House, stable block and Dutch barn
- Packhorse Inn
- Monsal Dale Viaduct (also known as Headstone Viaduct)
- Congregational Chapel
- Cosy Cottage and adjoining cottage

and four scheduled monuments, comprising one disused lead mine and a series of bowl barrows:

- White Cliff bowl barrow
- a bowl barrow west of Castlegate Lane
- two bowl barrows east of Hay Dale
- Putwell Hill Mine
