= Old Millclose Mine =

Lead mine in Derbyshire, England

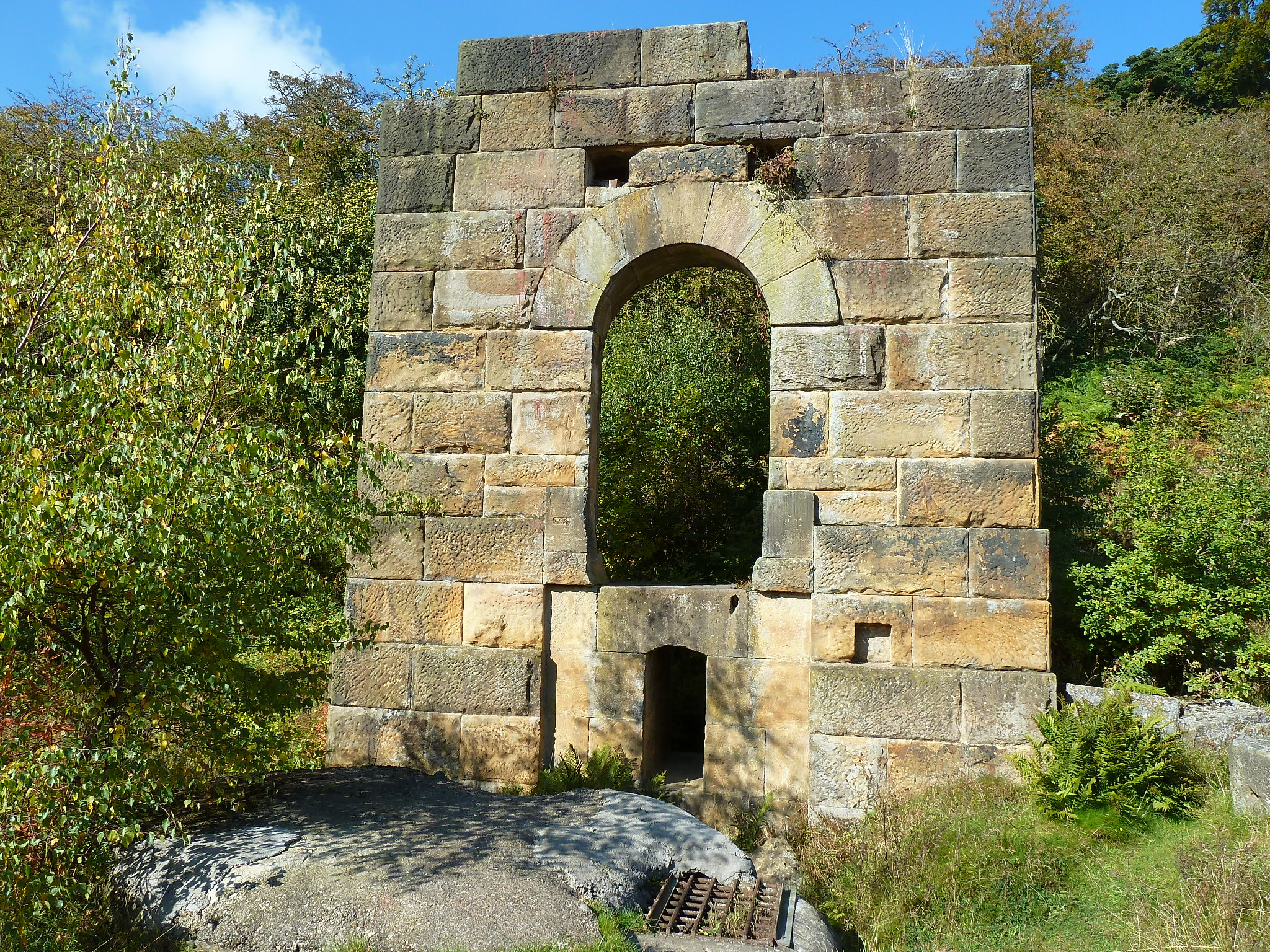

- Location within Derbyshire
- 53°9′10.8″N 1°36′57.3″W
- Location: near Wensley, Derbyshire
- OS grid reference: SK 258 618

History
- Built: 1859

Scheduled monument
- Designated: 18 April 1979
- Reference no.: 1017750

Old Millclose Mine was a lead mine near Wensley, in Derbyshire, England. The engine house of the mine survives as a ruin; it is a scheduled monument.

== History ==
The engine house was built from 1859 to 1860 by Edward Wass, owner of Lea Lead Works, who re-opened this mine. It housed a Cornish engine, made by Thornewill and Warham of Burton-on-Trent, to pump water from the mine via the Watts engine shaft nearby. The engine was in use until the early 1870s.

A new mine (Millclose Mine) was then opened about 450 metres (1,480 ft) to the north-east; it became known as the largest lead mine in Britain, eventually closing in 1940.

== Description ==
The "bob wall" of the engine house, thicker than the other walls, that supported the beam of the beam engine, survives to a height of 9 metres (30 ft). The arched opening that accommodated the beam was above the surviving section. It is of gritstone ashlar and is 1.5 metres (4 ft 11 in) thick. There are foundations or bases of the other walls.

Nearby are the foundations of a boiler house, a winding engine house and a chimney. East of the engine house is the stone-lined shaft, now capped and covered with a grille.

== See also ==
- Derbyshire lead mining history
