= Sparrowpit =

Village in Derbyshire, England

Coordinates: 53.323°N 1.865°W

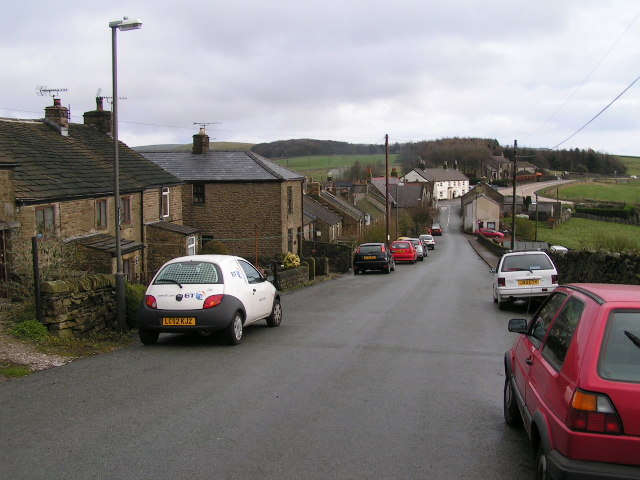
- Looking eastwards to the A623 and the Wanted Inn. This direct but steep road to Chapel-en-le-Frith through the village is the original turnpike route, but was superseded in the late 18th century by a new road via Barmoor Clough. The modern main road follows the newer route, hence the sharp bend at Sparrowpit.

- Location within Derbyshire
- OS grid reference: SK090806
- District: High Peak
- Shire county: Derbyshire
- Region: East Midlands
- Country: England
- Sovereign state: United Kingdom
- Post town: Buxton
- Postcode district: SK17
- Police: Derbyshire
- Fire: Derbyshire
- Ambulance: East Midlands
- UK Parliament: High Peak (UK Parliament constituency)

Sparrowpit is a small village between Chapel-en-le-Frith and Peak Forest in the High Peak area of the Peak District, Derbyshire, England.

The name is derived from 'spar row pit' from the fluorspar mines.

The village has an active community, including a methodist chapel and village hall.

It is situated at a crossroads where the main road (A623) takes a right-angled bend at the Wanted Inn. From this junction, one minor road takes a different and hillier route to Chapel-en-le-Frith, and another heads for Mam Tor and Castleton by way of the Winnats Pass.

The watershed between rivers running east into the North Sea and west into the Irish Sea runs almost exactly through the village.
