= Hungry Bentley =

Deserted medieval village in Derbyshire, England

Coordinates: 52.945°N 01.735°W

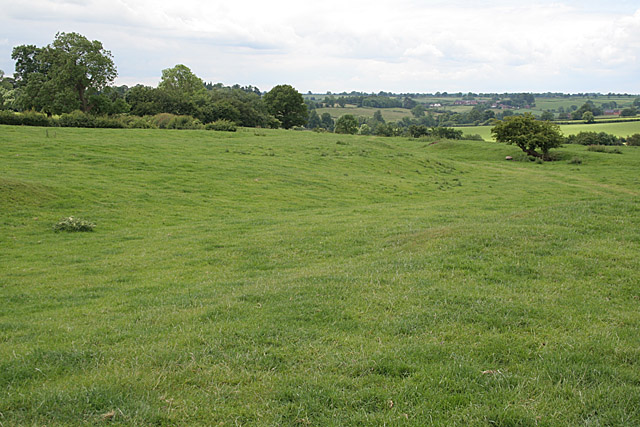
- The former site of Hungry Bentley

- Location within Derbyshire
- OS grid reference: SK17873866
- Shire county: Derbyshire
- Region: East Midlands
- Country: England
- Sovereign state: United Kingdom
- Post town: Ashbourne
- Postcode district: DE6
- Police: Derbyshire
- Fire: Derbyshire
- Ambulance: East Midlands

Hungry Bentley is a deserted medieval village and civil parish in the Derbyshire Dales district of Derbyshire, England, between Uttoxeter and Derby. The site is a scheduled monument and has been called the best "depopulated settlement" in Derbyshire. The name Bentley is said to mean a clearing with bent grass. The more unusual appellation of "Hungry" is said to refer to the poor quality of the land and the local inhabitants' poor food.

== History ==
Hungry Bently was mentioned in the Domesday Book as belonging to Henry de Ferrers and was worth eleven shillings

Wulfgeat and Ulfkil have one carucates of land to the geld. There is land for 1 plough. It is waste. TRE worth 20s now 11s. Ralph holds it.

In Domesday, the place was just called Bentley, which is said to mean a place where there is bent grass. The added word "Hungry" is considered to refer to the poor quality of the land and the local inhabitants' poor food. "Hungry" makes sure that this Bentley is not confused with other villages called Bentley, such as Fenny Bentley, which is very close.

After the Ferrers the place was owned by the Blounts, then Lord Mountjoy and then the Browne family. At some point the manor came to be owned by the Bentley family. Edward Bentley of Hungry Bentley was tried at the Old Bailey on a charge of high treason (being a catholic) and convicted in 1586. In 1801 the settlement had about 80 residents living in ten dwellings. Edward Wilmot had purchased the manor from the Bentley family. In 1817 it was the property of Sir Robert Wilmot, Baronet of Chaddesden, and Bentley Hall had become Bentley Hall Farmhouse, occupied by Daniel Oakden, yeoman farmer, father of Australian explorer John Jackson Oakden. By 1857, the whole of the manor had been transferred to Sir Sacheveral Wilmot, although it was noted that a small portion of land was excluded. That land was owned by the Rev. German Buckston of Bradbourne Hall. This land known as Boothey Hay Flats had been rented in 1686 for 1000 years at ten pounds a year. This rent had been converted to a freehold in 1829 for the payment of £67 and ten shillings.

In 1872 the village was included in a description of the parish of Longford. The "liberty" of Hungry Bentley was said to be in the possession of Lord Vernon and it was noted that there "used to be a chapel here".

The reason for the village's depopulation is unknown, but the poor agriculture, a move away from arable farming, a change in climate and the black death have been all been considered as possible reasons. The site was identified by the County of Derbyshire in 1956 as a scheduled monument. It is now scheduled as of national importance (Ref No. 29935). The similar village of Wharram Percy in Yorkshire is now thought to have been abandoned for economic reasons.

== Today ==
Hungry Bentley has been called the best "depopulated settlement" in Derbyshire. Inspection of the site shows clear evidence of where the main thoroughfares were and where many of the actual buildings were located. The most substantial building still standing is Bentley Hall, which aligns with the supposed thoroughfares of the abandoned village and the nearby Roman road of Long Lane.

== See also ==
- Listed buildings in Hungry Bentley
- Alkmonton medieval settlement, a deserted village nearby
