= Offerton, Derbyshire =

Coordinates: 53.324°N 1.681°W

Offerton
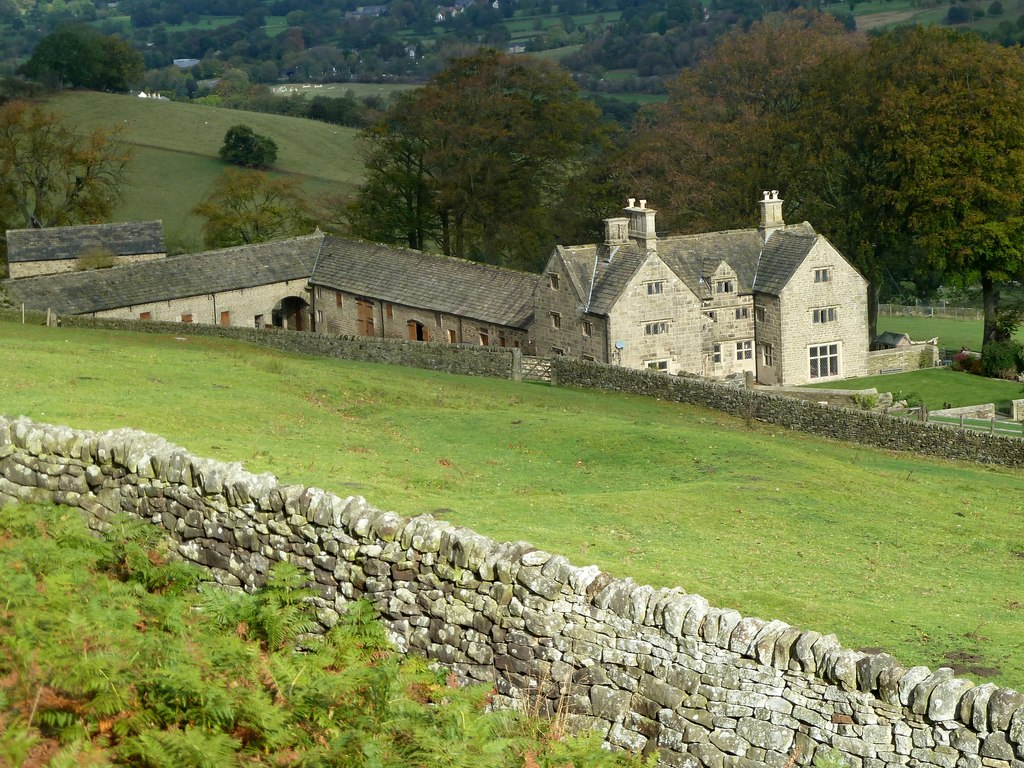
- Offerton Hall

- Location within Derbyshire
- OS grid reference: SK213808
- District: Derbyshire Dales
- Shire county: Derbyshire
- Region: East Midlands
- Country: England
- Sovereign state: United Kingdom
- Post town: HOPE VALLEY
- Postcode district: S32
- Police: Derbyshire
- Fire: Derbyshire
- Ambulance: East Midlands

Offerton is a hamlet and civil parish in the Derbyshire Dales district, in Derbyshire, England. It lies on the River Derwent. The village features Offerton House, a Grade II* listed building and the nearby Offerton Hall, also Grade II* listed.

== See also ==
- Listed buildings in Offerton, Derbyshire
