= Coombs Dale =

Valley in the Derbyshire Peak District, England

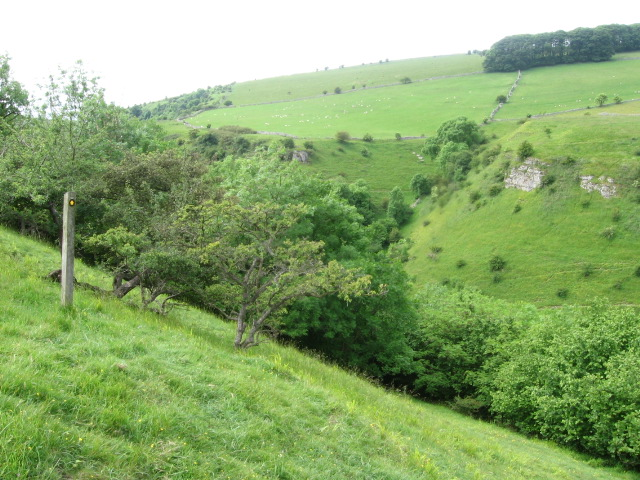
- View across Coombs Dale
- Length: 1.9 miles (3 km) West-East
- Width: 450 metres (1,476 ft)
- Depth: 150 metres (492 ft)

Geography
- Location: Derbyshire, England
- Coordinates: 53.2681°N 1.6750°W
- Interactive map of Coombs Dale

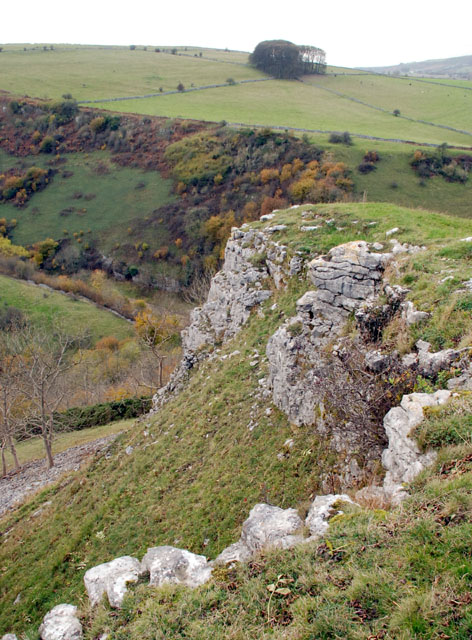
Limestone outcrop above Coombs Dale

Coombs Dale is a steep-sided, dry carboniferous limestone valley in the Derbyshire Peak District of England. The village of Calver lies about 1 km to the east and the village of Stoney Middleton lies less than 1 km to the north. The dale is cut into the hills on the east side of Longstone Moor. The upper end of the dale is known as Rough Side. Several springs flow down the dale during winter and after heavy rains.

The fossil-rich limestone was formed from deposits in a warm shallow sea in the Brigantian stage of the Carboniferous period (around 330 million years ago). Coombs Dale is a designated Site of Special Scientific Interest (SSSI). Ash trees and hazel grow on the scree slopes of the dale sides. Varied shrubs and wild flowers include dogwood, blackthorn, common rock-rose, wild thyme, bloody cranesbill, lily-of-the-valley, mountain melick, woolly thistle, maiden pink, leadwort, cowslip, rare dark-red helleborine and orchids. The local limestone fern Gymnocarpium robertianum thrives on the scree and the rare fingered sedge Carex digitata can be found in places. Grazed native grasses are mainly meadow oat-grass and glaucous sedge. The dale is also habitat for dark green fritillary and brown argus butterflies.

Longstone Edge, above the south side of the dale, has been mined for minerals for many centuries. Lead mining heaps and beehive mine shafts are spread across the terrain. Nearby Cavendish Mill has been a processing centre for fluorspar since 1965. Sallet Hole Mine is a 19th-century fluorspar mine in the centre of Coombs Dale, which closed in 1998. There is a disused quarry at the foot of Coombs Dale.

Black Harry Gate is at the head of the dale, leading onto Black Harry Lane (an old packhorse route across the moorland). In the early 18th century, a notorious highwayman called Black Harry ambushed and robbed travellers crossing the local moors. He was finally caught by the Castleton constabulary and was hanged, drawn and quartered on the Gallows Tree at nearby Wardlow Mires. There also used to be a Black Harry Farm but it was demolished in the 1970s when the Blakedon Hollow lagoon was built to treat the waste from the fluorspar industry.

Coombs Dale is designated as 'Open Access' land for the public, following the Countryside and Rights of Way Act 2000. There is an easy-going footpath along the length of the valley floor. There is access into the dale from both ends, as well as footpaths from Stoney Middleton and Calver into the central section of the valley.

Coombs Dale was featured on the TV programme Walks Around Britain in 2016 (season 2 episode 6).
