= Curbar =

Village in Derbyshire, England

Coordinates: 53.268°N 1.624°W

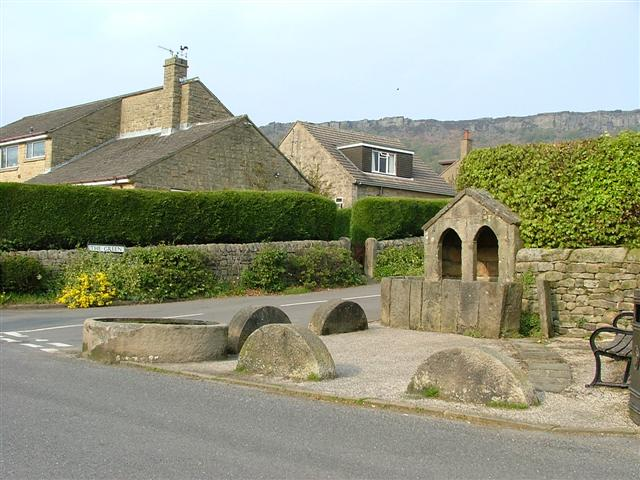
- Old well, horse trough and millstones at junction in centre of village

- Location within Derbyshire
- Population: 417 (2011)
- OS grid reference: SK251746
- District: Derbyshire Dales
- Shire county: Derbyshire
- Region: East Midlands
- Country: England
- Sovereign state: United Kingdom
- Post town: HOPE VALLEY
- Postcode district: S32
- Dialling code: 01433
- Police: Derbyshire
- Fire: Derbyshire
- Ambulance: East Midlands

Curbar is a village and civil parish in the Derbyshire Dales district of Derbyshire, England. The population based on the 2011 Census was 417. Curbar is situated a mile north of Baslow, close to Calver on the A623.

The village has a street (Bar Road) with the highest average house value in Derbyshire. Close to the east are the popular rock-climbing escarpments of Curbar Edge and Baslow Edge. To the west of the village is the River Derwent. The parish church is dedicated to All Saints. Immediately to the south of the church stands Curbar Primary School, which serves the three villages of Curbar, Calver and Froggatt. The school is the custodian of an old May custom known as the Maybough. On the first of May, or as soon as possible thereafter, a tree-branch is brought into school and decorated with flowers by the children. The Maybough is taken to various points in Curbar and Calver, where it is displayed to the accompaniment of songs and a dance. Several attempts have been made to ascertain the origin of the Maybough. The event was originally performed by the villagers rather than the school, the switchover taking place around the time of the First World War.

== See also ==
- Listed buildings in Curbar
- All Saints' Church, Curbar
