= Great Longstone War Memorial =

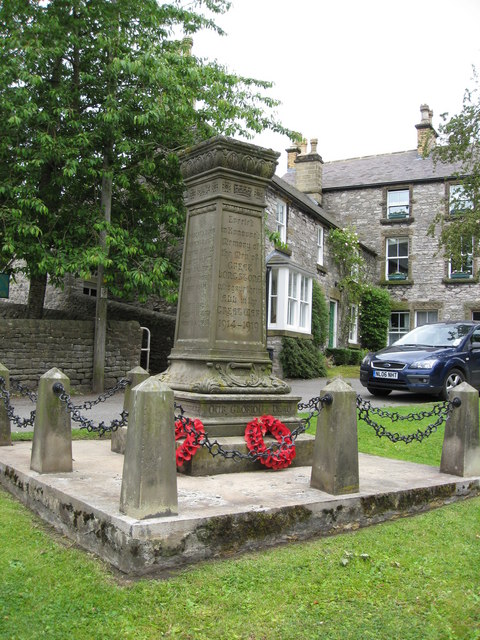
- Great Longstone War Memorial

- Location in Derbyshire
- 53°14′34″N 1°42′11″W
- Location: Great Longstone, Derbyshire, England

Listed Building – Grade II
- Official name: War Memorial
- Designated: 22 March 1985
- Reference no.: 1334973

Great Longstone War Memorial is a 20th-century grade II listed war memorial in Great Longstone, Derbyshire.

== History ==
The war memorial was unveiled on 22 July 1923, with the Duke of Devonshire in attendance.

The memorial has been Grade II listed since 22 March 1985.

== See also ==
- Listed buildings in Great Longstone
