= Stoney Middleton Bath House =

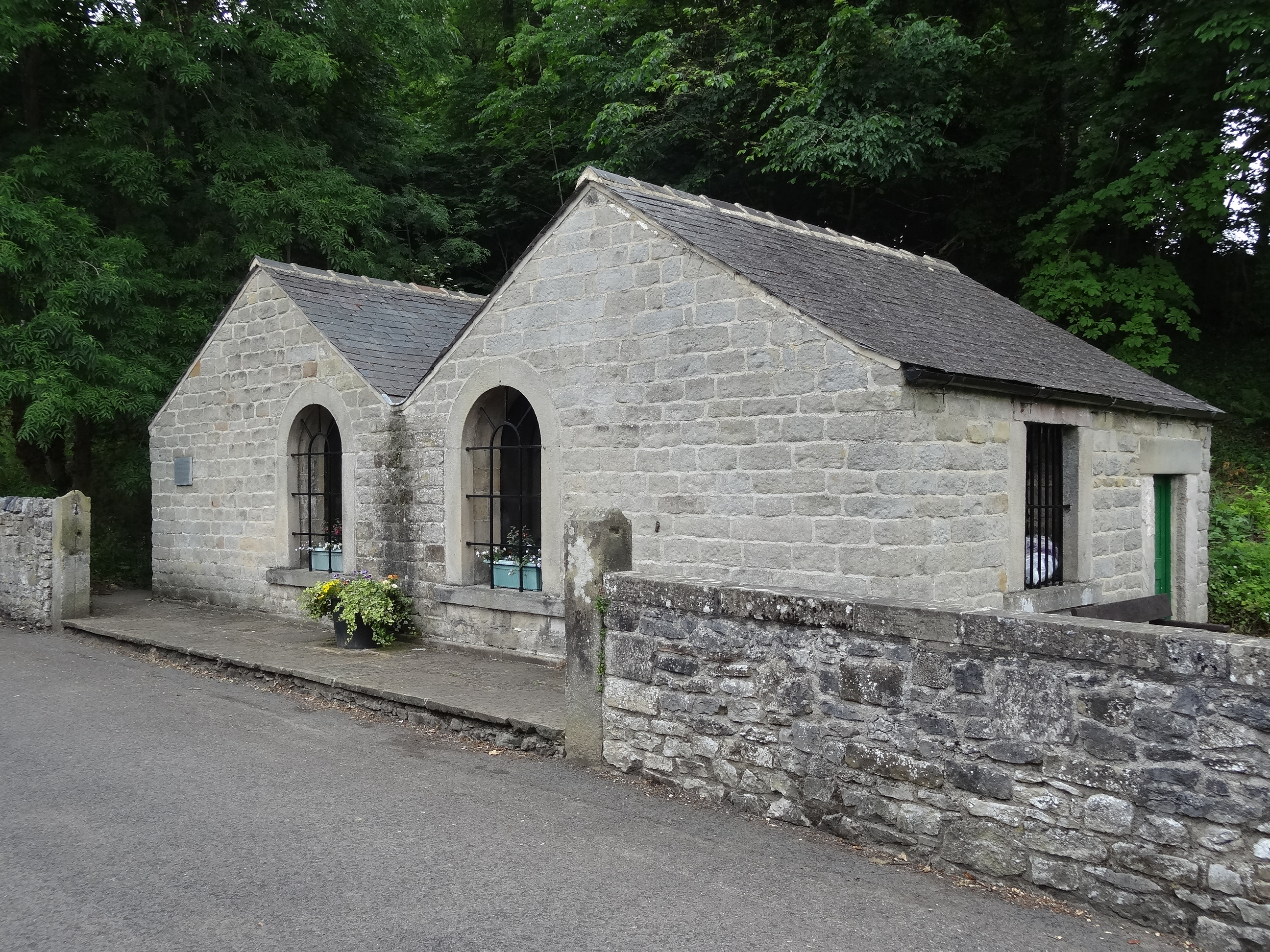
- Stoney Middleton Bath House

- Location in Derbyshire
- 53°16′34″N 1°33′56″W
- Location: Stoney Middleton, Derbyshire, England

Listed Building – Grade II
- Official name: Roman Bath House
- Designated: 14 July 1980
- Reference no.: 1109972

Stoney Middleton Bath House is a grade-II listed bath house in Stoney Middleton, Derbyshire, England. Despite the baths being described as 'Roman' there is no evidence to suggest the Romans built baths on the site.

== History ==
The bath was built in the early 19th-century, with separate by Thomas Denman of Middleton Hall and Lord Chief Justice of England.

== See also ==
- Listed buildings in Stoney Middleton
