= Great Longstone =

Village in Derbyshire, England

Coordinates: 53.242°N 1.701°W

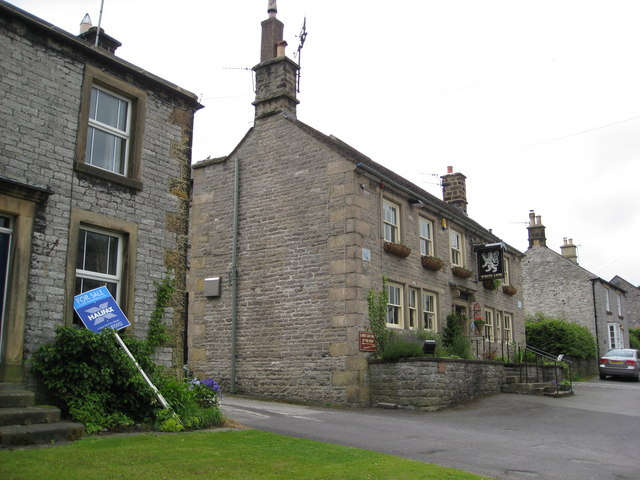
- Main Street

- Location within Derbyshire
- Population: 843 (2011)
- OS grid reference: SK210720
- District: Derbyshire Dales
- Shire county: Derbyshire
- Region: East Midlands
- Country: England
- Sovereign state: United Kingdom
- Post town: BAKEWELL
- Postcode district: DE45
- Dialling code: 01629
- Police: Derbyshire
- Fire: Derbyshire
- Ambulance: East Midlands
- UK Parliament: High Peak

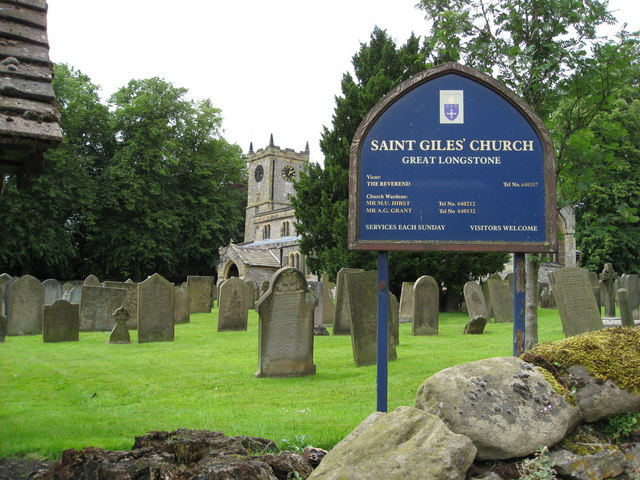
Saint Giles' Church

Great Longstone, with Little Longstone, is one of two villages in the local government district of Derbyshire Dales in Derbyshire, England. The population (including Hassop and Rowland, but not Little Longstone) as taken at the 2011 Census was 843.

== History ==
A place called Longsdune was mentioned in the Domesday Book as belonging to Henry de Ferrers and being worth thirty shillings; this is considered to be Great Longstone.

The church of St Giles in Great Longstone dates from the 13th century. A medieval cross stands in the churchyard, and the head of a cross is built into the wall of the vestry.

The manor house, Longstone Hall, has its origins in the following century, but was rebuilt in the mid-18th century. That century was one of prosperity, with lead-mining and shoemaking. There are two public houses in the main village: The Crispin Inn, named after St Crispin, the patron saint of shoemakers, and The White Lion.

The manors of Great and Little Longstone passed through many hands over the years. Walter Blount, Lord Mountjoy, was Lord of the manor on his death in 1474, when the lordship passed to Robert Shakerley and his wife Margaret, daughter and heiress of Roger Levett. The two families' coats of arms adorn the church of St Giles. In subsequent years, Shakerley descendants sold the manor to Elizabeth Talbot, Countess of Shrewsbury.

A market cross stands on the village green.

Little Longstone, further west, has a 17th-century manor house and still has its village stocks.

To the north is Longstone Edge, a limestone ridge some 1,300 feet (400 m) in height, on an upfolding of the Derbyshire limestone known as the Longstone Anticline. It has been, and is, intensively quarried for galena, fluorspar, barytes and, more controversially, limestone. Since Longstone Edge is a noted beauty spot and is within the Peak District National Park there is strong local pressure for quarrying to stop altogether. Some of the quarrying is strictly controlled by the Peak District National Park Authority, which has been conducting a lengthy legal battle to try to stop other quarries that are operating outside the authority's guidelines. Further north is the White Cliff, where the exposed limestone contains fossilised corals.

There are four Sites of Special Scientific Interest wholly or partly in the parish. The largest is Longstone Moor, rising to approximately 395 metres (1,296 ft) above sea level to the northwest of Longstone Edge. The moor is described by Natural England as "the largest example of limestone heathland in the Peak District National Park" and "the best of only a very few remaining areas of this unusual type of vegetation". It is considered to be of "particular importance" for its lichens, including Centraria islandica, rare in the Peak District and in lowland Britain in general. Within the confines of the moor are three scheduled monuments, namely the remains of Cackle Mackle Lead Mine and two bowl barrows. In the far west of the parish is a section of the Cressbrook Dale SSSI, part of the Derbyshire Dales National Nature Reserve. In the north-east, the southern bank of Coombs Dale falls within the parish boundary; among its notable species are woolly thistle Cirsium eriophorum ("a southern species, rare in Derbyshire"), the limestone fern Gymnocarpium robertianum and the rare fingered sedge Carex digitata. Finally, a tiny and isolated area of the Wye Valley SSSI falls partly within the parish boundary next to Castlegate Lane.

There was a railway station, built by the Midland Railway in 1863 when it extended the Manchester, Buxton, Matlock and Midlands Junction Railway towards Buxton. Originally known as "Longstone", in 1913 it was renamed "Great Longstone for Ashford" (Ashford-in-the-Water). It closed in 1962, but the building, designed to match the nearby Thornbridge Hall, survives as a domestic residence, and the trackbed through the station is part of the 8.5-mile (13.7 km) Monsal Trail, a walk and cycleway.

=== Notable people ===
- George Furness (1820–1900), construction engineer and benefactor, described himself as a "contractor of public works"

== See also ==
- Listed buildings in Great Longstone
