= Listed buildings in Calver =

Calver is a civil parish in the Derbyshire Dales district of Derbyshire, England. The parish contains nine listed buildings that are recorded in the National Heritage List for England. Of these, one is listed at Grade II*, the middle of the three grades, and the others are at Grade II, the lowest grade. The parish contains the village of Calver and the surrounding area. The listed buildings consist of a house, a cottage, a farmhouse, a mounting block and a lamp standard, a bridge, a former schoolroom, a former mill and wheelhouse, and a milestone.

== Key ==
| Grade | Criteria |
|---|---|
| II* | Particularly important buildings of more than special interest |
| II | Buildings of national importance and special interest |

== Buildings ==
| Name and location | Photograph | Date | Notes | Grade |
|---|---|---|---|---|
| 2 Lowside; 53.26827°N 1.64112°W | | 18th century | A sandstone house with rusticated quoins, an eaves band, and a slate roof with coped gables and moulded kneelers. There are three storeys and two bays. The central doorway has a moulded surround and a hood mould. To its left is a casement window, the middle floor contains a sash window and a blind window, and in the top floor is a Venetian window. | II |
| Lamp standard and mounting block 53.26781°N 1.64086°W | | 18th century | In the centre of the village square is a mounting block in gritstone, consisting of two square blocks with overhanging caps and angle stones. It is surmounted by a 19th-century lamp standard in cast iron on a stone plinth. On the plinth is an inscribed metal plaque. | II |
| Jasmine Cottage; 53.26791°N 1.64117°W | | Late 18th century | The cottage is in limestone with gritstone dressings, quoins, and a stone slate roof. There are two storeys and two bays. The doorway has a quoined surround and the windows are two-light mullioned casements. | II |
| Knouchley Farmhouse; 53.27635°N 1.64161°W | | Late 18th century | The farmhouse is in roughcast gritstone, with quoins, a plinth band, bracketed eaves, and a hipped stone slate roof. There are two storeys, three bays, and a lean-to and link wall at the north end. The doorway has a rectangular fanlight, and the windows are sashes, some blocked and painted. | II |
| Calver Bridge; 53.26663°N 1.63152°W | | c. 1800 | The bridge carries a road over the River Derwent, and is in gritstone. It consists of three segmental arches with moulded hood moulds, and rounded cutwaters with domed heads. Pilaster buttresses rise from the cutwaters, and the moulded string course steps over them. The cambered parapet has oversailing copings with chamfered edges, and the curving abutment walls end in square piers with square caps. | II* |
| Calver Mill; 53.26740°N 1.63106°W | | 1803–04 | A cotton mill, later converted for residential use, it is in gritstone with roofs of stone slate and tile. There are six storeys and a T-shaped plan, consisting of a main range with 20 bays, a two-bay rear staircase tower, a two-storey six-bay wing to the west, and small polygonal former privy towers to the east and west. Running through the centre of the mill is a segmental arch, and the windows are sashes. | II |
| Former Schoolroom, Stocking Farm; 53.26886°N 1.63225°W | | c. 1817 | Built as a Sunday school, later a mill school, and then used for other purposes, the building is in gritstone with quoins, and a tile roof with a gabled bellcote on the south. There are two storeys and three bays. On the east front is a blocked round archway with impost blocks and a keystone, to its left is a segmental-arched cart entry with a keystone, and further to the left are external steps on two circular columns. In the upper floor is a doorway, a circular window to the left, and two mullioned and transomed windows to the right. The south gable end contains an inserted entrance and above is a round-headed window with a moulded impost band. | II |
| Milestone; 53.27015°N 1.64408°W | | Early 19th century | The milestone on the southwest side of The Avenue, (A623 road), is in gritstone. It consists of a chamfered block with a rounded top stepped up in the middle. The milestone is inscribed with the distances to Tideswell, Chapel-en-le-Frith, Manchester, and Chesterfield. | II |
| Wheelhouse, Calver Mill; 53.26722°N 1.63133°W | | 1833–34 | The former wheelhouse is in gritstone with a hipped Welsh slate roof. There is a single storey and a rectangular plan. On the west front are two segmental arches with a cutwater between, and the east front has two segmental arches with five tall small-pane windows above. | II |
