= Listed buildings in Wardlow, Derbyshire =

Wardlow is a civil parish in the Derbyshire Dales district of Derbyshire, England. The parish contains three listed buildings that are recorded in the National Heritage List for England. All the listed buildings are designated at Grade II, the lowest of the three grades, which is applied to "buildings of national importance and special interest". The parish contains the village of Wardlow and the surrounding countryside. The listed buildings consist of a farmhouse and attached barn, a public house, and a church with an attached school.

== Buildings ==
Name and location	Photograph	Date	Notes
Hall Farmhouse and barn 53.26633°N 1.72751°W		Late 17th century	The farmhouse and barn are in limestone with gritstone dressings, and roofs of Welsh slate and stone slate with coped gables and moulded kneelers. There are two storeys, and the buildings form an L-shaped plan. The farmhouse has quoins and a moulded string course, most of the windows are mullioned, some with hood moulds, and in the gable are two oval windows in rectangular surrounds with moulded hood moulds. The openings in the barn include doorways and windows.
The Three Stags' Heads; 53.27713°N 1.73017°W		Mid to late 18th century	A farmhouse with attached outbuildings, later a public house, in limestone with gritstone dressings, partly rendered and painted. The roof is mainly in Welsh slate, the east bay is in stone slate, and the west gable is coped. The public house has two storeys and four bays, the east bay taller, and the outbuildings to the west have a single storey and overlofts, and six bays. The main doorway to the public house has a bracketed hood, there is a smaller doorway to the west, and the windows have small panes. On the outbuildings are external steps leading up to a doorway with a massive surround, and there are other doorways and windows.
Church of Good Shepherd and school 53.26942°N 1.72935°W		1872–73	The church and attached school are in limestone with gritstone dressings, and Welsh slate roofs with coped gables and moulded kneelers. The church and school form a T-shaped plan, they have a single storey, and at the junction is a twin gabled bellcote. The church is in Gothic style, it has a doorway with a four-centred arch and a moulded hood mould, and above it is a stone plaque. The west window has four lights and is in Perpendicular style. The school contains three-light mullioned windows with hood moulds.
