= Thornbridge Hall =

Grade II listed house in Derbyshire, England

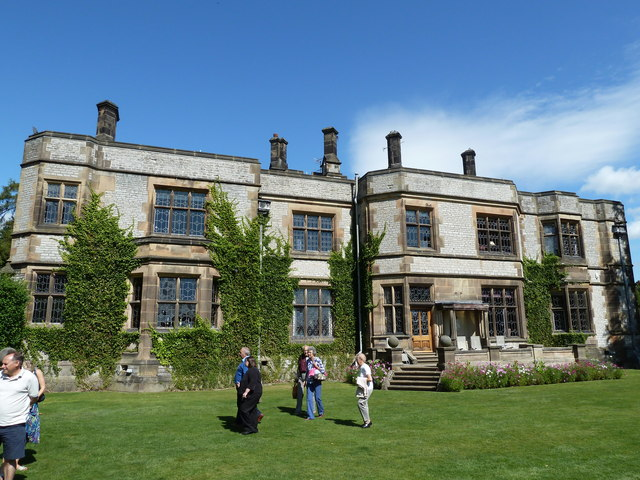
- Interactive map of the Thornbridge Hall area
- Former names: Thornbridge House

General information
- Location: Great Longstone, England
- Coordinates: 53.234959°N 1.705112°W
- Client: Longsdon family

Design and construction
- Architects: J.B. Mitchell-Withers 1871; Charles Hadfield 1897

Website
- thornbridgehall.co.uk

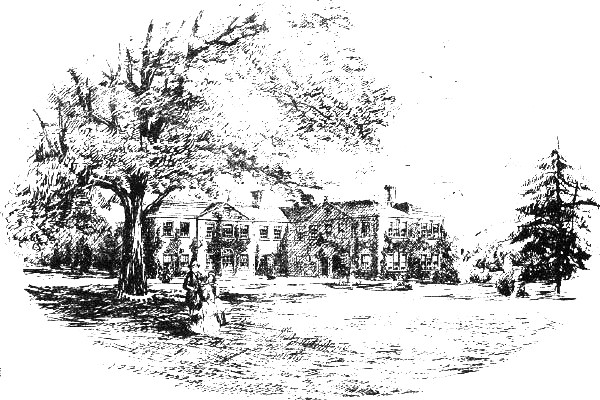
South view of Thornbridge Hall, 1871

Thornbridge Hall is a large English country house near the village of Great Longstone in the Derbyshire Dales. It is a Grade II listed building.

== History ==
From the 12th to the late 18th century, Thornbridge Hall was the seat of the Longsdon family. In 1790, Andrew Morewood bought Thornbridge Hall for the large sum of £10,000, equivalent to £1,303,600 in 2025. He made his money exporting linens from Manchester to St Petersburg in Russia. The Morewood family considerably enlarged the house.

George Morewood died in 1857 and the house was put up for sale. Until around 1870 the house was owned by John Sleigh JP.

In 1872, Frederick Craven acquired the property and in 1873 rebuilt it in Jacobean style and installed the William Morris/Edward Burne-Jones window in the Great Hall. This was done to the designs of the Sheffield architect J.B. Mitchell-Withers. Frederick Craven died in April 1884 and the house was put up for sale in 1895.

In 1896, George Marples, a Sheffield businessman and lawyer, extended the house to nearly its present form, built lodges and cottages, landscaped the park and gardens, added his own private railway station, and acquired the Watson buffet fountain from Chatsworth House.

The estate was sold in May 1930 for £16,750 to Charles Boot, the Sheffield entrepreneur who designed and built Pinewood Studios. At the sale it was reported that the estate covered 185,453 acres. In a three-day auction in June 1930, many of the contents were sold. Charles Boot added items from Clumber Park and panelling from Derwent Hall. His company, Henry Boot Construction, was contracted to demolish Clumber after a fire in 1938. It was Boot who was responsible for bringing the many items to Thornbridge. On the death of Charles Boot in 1945, many of the contents were sold at auction raising £8,000 but Thornbridge Hall still retains a vast array of statues, facades and fountains originally belonging to Clumber.

Sheffield City Council took over the house in 1945 and it became a teacher training college, Thornbridge Hall College of Education. At this time the house was of sufficient note that a Great Western Railway GWR 6959 Class steam locomotive – No. 6964, built in May 1944 – was named Thornbridge Hall in June 1947. It was withdrawn from service in September 1965 and later scrapped at T. Ward in Beighton, Sheffield. In later years, the hall was used as an educational and conference centre by the council, providing residential facilities for teachers and pupils in the house itself and in various outbuildings.

The Hunt family purchased the house from the Council in 1997 for £850,000 and started restoration work to the gardens, and removed additions to the house to reveal its earlier proportions.

== Gardens ==
The 12 acres of formal gardens were designed at the end of the 19th century by Simeon Marshall, working for the James Backhouses & Sons nursery. They were inspired by the vision of the owner, George Marples, to create a '1000 shades of green' to be viewed from his bedroom window. Areas of the garden include an Italian garden, Scented Terrace, Water Garden, koi pond, Kitchen Garden and Orangery, amongst others.

Recent developments include:

- the Scented Terrace created in 2011, situated below the Kitchen Garden and The Orangery. The garden is full of lilacs, roses, bearded irises, lilies and other fragrant flowers and plants
- a new Knot Garden created in 2017, replacing a box hedge knot garden. The new knot garden is full of grasses, salvias, alliums, geums and yew
- in 2019 Cascade Garden (phase 1) was created. Situated below the koi pond, and complete with a waterfall, this area has been terraced by gabions filled with a mixture of tufa and yew. Bananas, ginger, tree ferns, bamboo, gunnera and many other 'exotic' plants fill this area.

In 2017, the gardens became a Royal Horticultural Society (RHS) partner garden. They are open to the public all year round, with free RHS member access at certain times.

== Present use ==
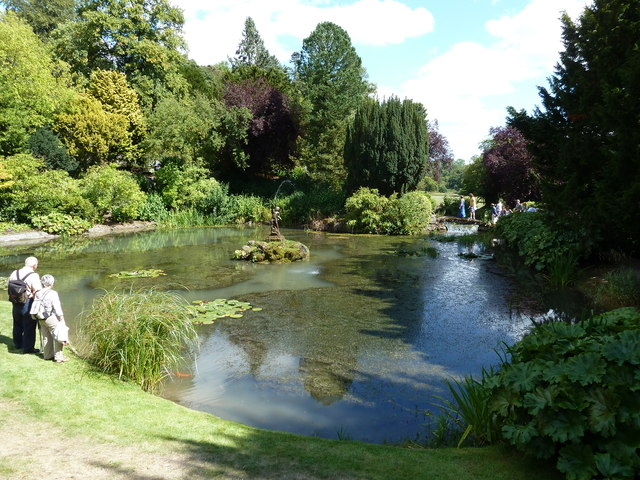
Thornbridge Hall Gardens

From 2002, Thornbridge Hall has been owned by Jim and Emma Harrison, owners of Thornbridge Brewery and A4e respectively, and is both a private family home and a venue for events, including weddings. The gardens are open to the public all year round.

The original Thornbridge Brewery was based in a converted joiner's and stonemason's workshop within the grounds of Thornbridge Hall.

== See also ==
- Listed buildings in Ashford-in-the-Water
- Listed buildings in Great Longstone
