= St Martin's Church, Stoney Middleton =

St Martin’s Church, Stoney Middleton
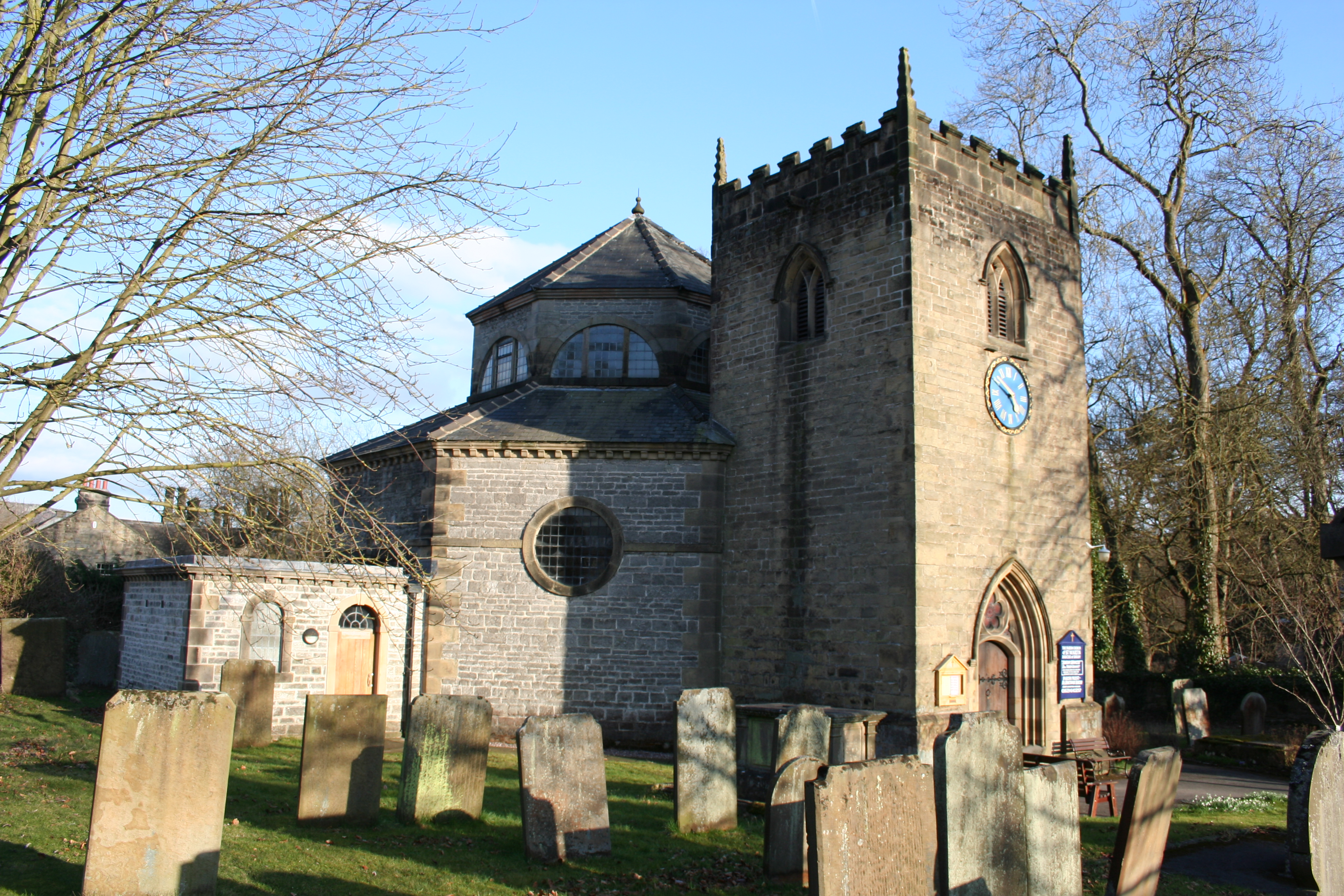
- St Martin’s Church, Stoney Middleton
- St Martin’s Church, Stoney Middleton
- 53°16′32.88″N 1°39′14.4″W
- OS grid reference: SK 23168 75479
- Location: Stoney Middleton
- Country: England
- Denomination: Church of England

History
- Dedication: St Martin

Architecture
- Heritage designation: Grade II* listed

Administration
- Diocese: Diocese of Derby
- Archdeaconry: Chesterfield
- Deanery: Bakewell and Eyam
- Parish: Stoney Middleton

St Martin's Church is a Grade II* listed parish church in the Church of England in Stoney Middleton, Derbyshire.

== History ==
The church dates from the 15th century and was built by Joan Eyre to celebrate the safe return of her husband from the Battle of Agincourt. Following a serious fire in 1757, the main body of the church was rebuilt in 1759 in an octagonal form by James Paine.

The church was restored in 1861 when the west gallery was removed, and a north vestry was added in 1880.

== Parish status ==
The church is in a joint parish with

- All Saints' Church, Curbar
- St Giles' Church, Longstone
- The Good Shepherd Church, Wardlow

== Organ ==
The church contains a pipe organ by Cousans Sons and Co dating from 1903. A specification of the organ can be found on the National Pipe Organ Register.

== See also ==
- Grade II* listed buildings in Derbyshire Dales
- Listed buildings in Stoney Middleton
