= Three Stags' Heads =

Listed pub in Wardlow, Derbyshire, England

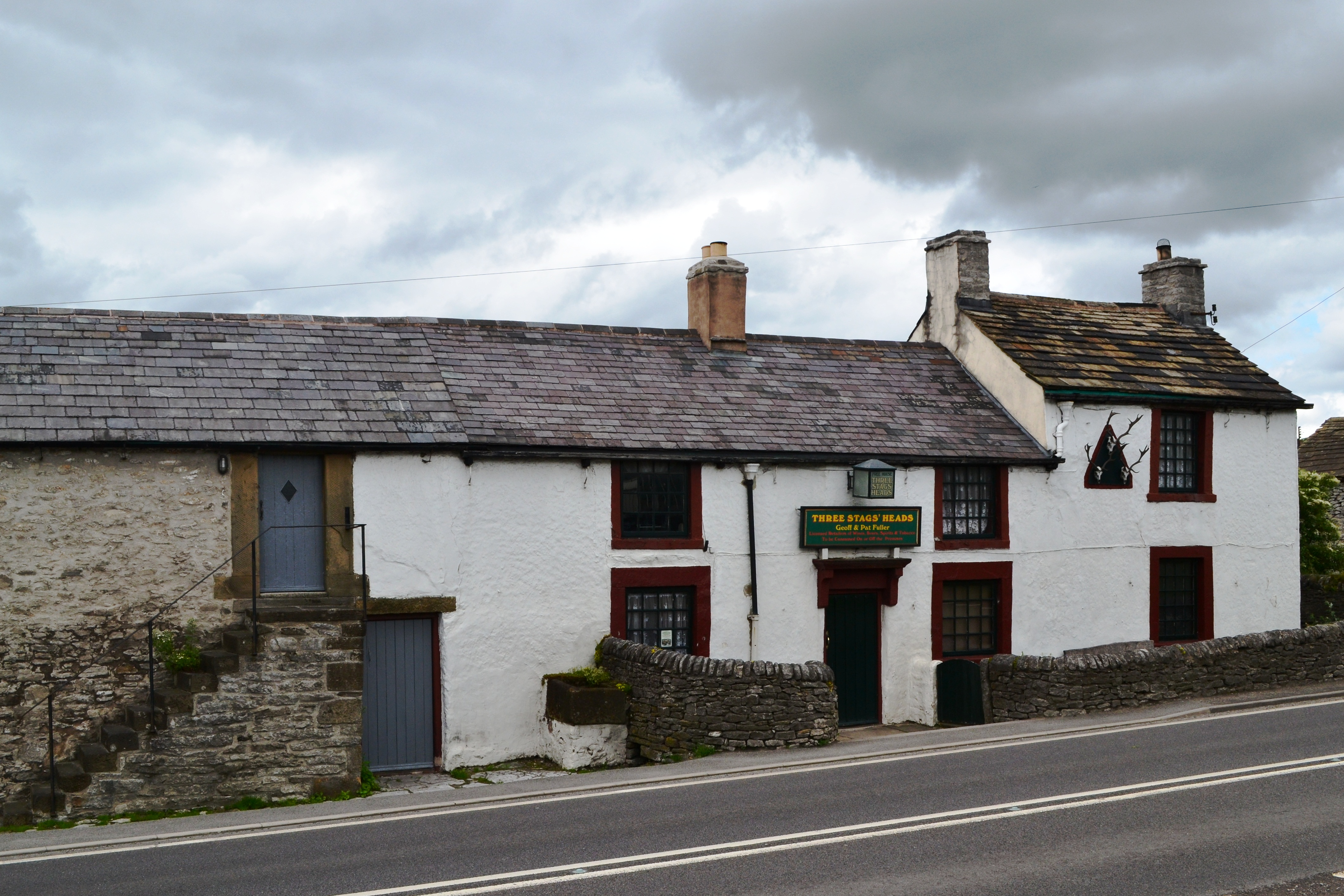
- The pub in 2012

General information
- Type: Public house; originally a farmhouse and outbuildings
- Location: Mires Lane, Wardlow Mires, Derbyshire, England
- Coordinates: 53.277165°N 1.729991°W
- Year built: Mid to late 18th century
- Renovated: 19th and 20th century (altered and added)
- Owner: Independent

Design and construction
- Designations

Listed Building – Grade II
- Official name: Three Stags Heads
- Designated: 23 June 2000
- Reference no.: 1380338

The Three Stags' Heads is a Grade II listed public house on Mires Lane in Wardlow Mires, a hamlet in Derbyshire, England. Originating as a mid to late 18th-century farmhouse with associated agricultural buildings, it was later converted into a pub. Its largely unaltered interior has been recognised by the Campaign for Real Ale (CAMRA), which awards it three stars on its National Inventory of Historic Pub Interiors, denoting an interior of "outstanding national historic importance". As of August 2026, the pub remained in independent ownership.

== History ==
The building originated as a mid to late 18th-century farmhouse with an attached range of outbuildings, and was later converted into a public house. It underwent alterations and extensions during the 19th and 20th centuries. According to the Campaign for Real Ale (CAMRA), the property also served travellers using a nearby road junction while retaining its agricultural function. CAMRA notes that the former livestock buildings were later adapted for other uses, including a pottery operated by the owners, and that a bar counter was not installed until the 1940s.

Geoff and Pat Fuller took over the pub's licence in 1988 and also operated a pottery business from the premises. The pub developed a long association with Abbeydale Brewery, which delivered its first cask there in 1996 and brews the house beer, Black Lurcher. On 23 June 2000, the Three Stags' Heads was designated a Grade II listed building. In 2012, the Fullers established the Wardlow Mires Pottery and Food Festival, which began at the pub before expanding into an annual event. Geoff and Pat retired from the day-to-day running of the pub in 2019, and ownership later passed to their nephews and niece.

It was included on CAMRA's National Inventory of Historic Pub Interiors before the inventory's grading system was revised. Under the revised scheme, it is rated three stars and its interior is regarded as being "of outstanding national historic importance". As of August 2026, the freehold remained in independent ownership.

== Architecture ==
=== Exterior ===
The building is constructed of local stone. Its roofs are covered mainly in Welsh slate, although the taller eastern section retains stone slates, and several chimney stacks rise from the roofline. The pub occupies the eastern end of the building and contains three connected bar areas, with the serving area positioned in the middle. To the west, the former agricultural ranges have been adapted for storage use. The principal frontage is arranged over two storeys, with a taller section at the eastern end that may represent a later addition. This part contains small-paned windows on both floors and a doorway sheltered by a modest canopy.

Elsewhere, the windows are similarly traditional in character and a further entrance is located towards the western side. Attached to the rear and west is a long range incorporating former loft spaces, reached in part by an external stone staircase. Openings that once served the upper storage areas have since been glazed, while other former doorways have been altered or converted to windows.

=== Interior ===
The interior retains several traditional features, including a timber porch in the central bar and stone-flagged floors. A large fireplace survives with a substantial beam and timber mantel, together with 19th-century iron fittings, while a built-in cupboard with a panelled door is set into one wall. The main bar retains simple fittings, including a mid-20th-century bar counter and painted shelving backed by mirrors. Other rooms contain features such as dado panelling, fixed bench seating, serving hatches and additional stone-surround fireplaces. The former outbuilding contains five cattle stalls separated by stone divisions, reflecting the building's agricultural origins.

== In popular culture ==
The Three Stags' Heads was cited by Neil Gaiman as an inspiration for his short story Black Dog.

== See also ==
- Listed buildings in Wardlow, Derbyshire
