= Stoney Middleton =

Village in Derbyshire, England

Coordinates: 53.276°N 1.656°W

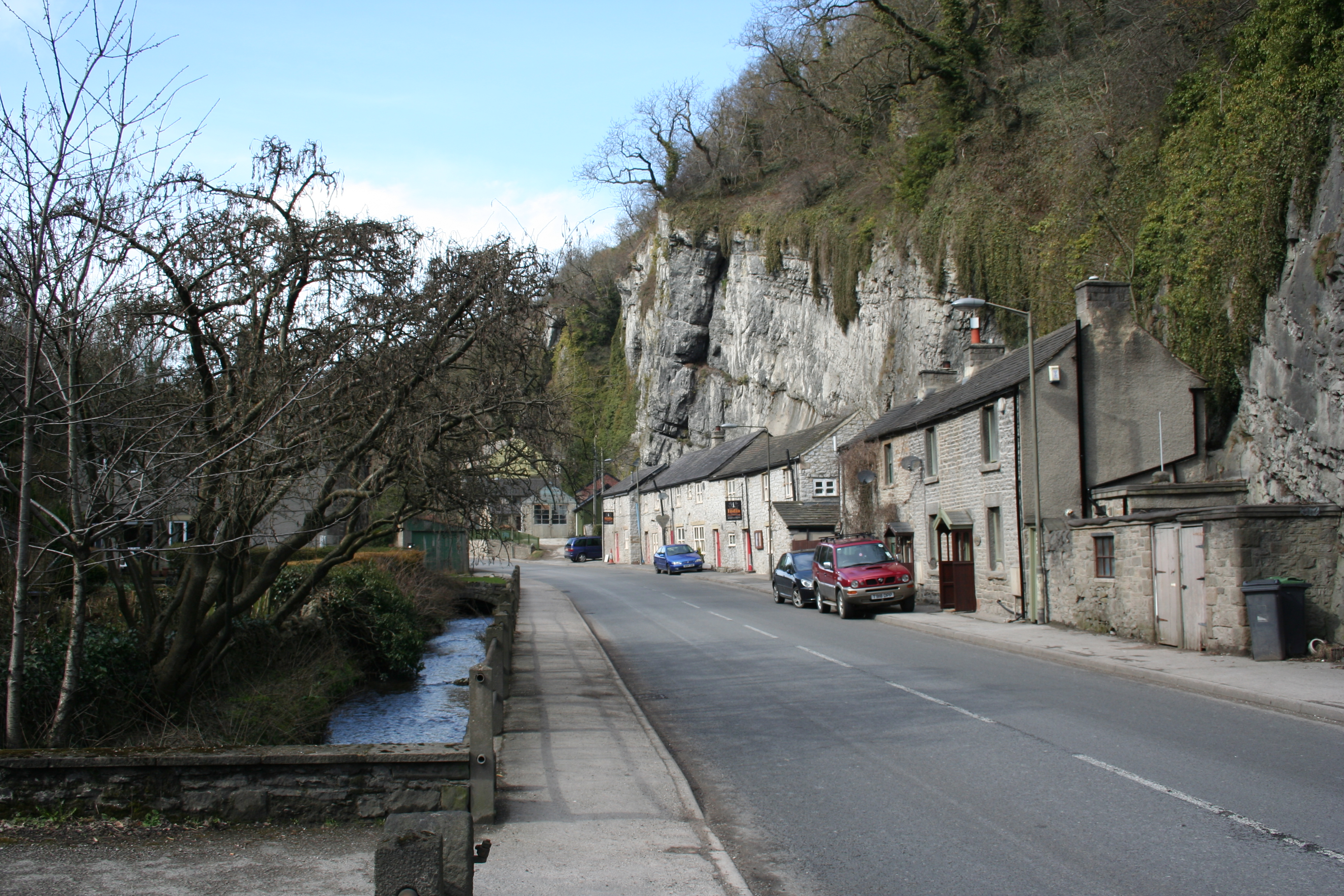
- Middleton Dale and the Dale Brook from Stoney Middleton

- Location within Derbyshire
- Population: 470 (2011)
- OS grid reference: SK230754
- District: Derbyshire Dales
- Shire county: Derbyshire
- Region: East Midlands
- Country: England
- Sovereign state: United Kingdom
- Post town: HOPE VALLEY
- Postcode district: S32
- Dialling code: 01433
- Police: Derbyshire
- Fire: Derbyshire
- Ambulance: East Midlands
- UK Parliament: Derbyshire Dales

Stoney Middleton is a village and civil parish in the Derbyshire Dales district of Derbyshire, England. It is in the White Peak area of the Peak District southeast of Eyam and northwest of Calver, on the A623 road at the foot of the limestone valley of Middleton Dale. The population at the 2011 Census was 470.

== History ==
The village is thought to be a Roman settlement, perhaps based on lead mining, but there is currently no archaeological evidence to prove this. A 19th-century bathhouse over a hot spring is known locally as The Roman Baths, but this was built in an unsuccessful attempt to establish a spa resort. (After Stoney Middleton Youth Club cleared undergrowth in the early 1980s, the building was consolidated and made secure by local craftsmen with the aid of a grant by Peak Park).

A semi-circular earth platform called "Castle Hill" overlooks the village; academic opinion varies as to what this earthwork originally was. It may have been a ringwork castle, or simply the foundations of a summer house. The origins of the name of the village go back to the Saxo-Norman period when it was known as Middletone or Middletune, the name Stoney Middleton literally meaning 'stony middle farm'.

=== Domesday Book ===
Stoney Middleton is mentioned in 1086 in the Domesday Book. The manor is first recorded as being where the king, William the Conqueror, had land:

In Stoney Middleton, Godgyth had four bovates of land to the geld. Land for four oxen. There 6 villans and one bordar have 2 ploughs and four acres of meadow and a little scrubland. TRE as now worth six shillings.

The book then says under the title of "The lands of Ralph fitzHubert":

In Stoney Middleton Leofnoth and his brother had one carucate of land. There is land for one plough. It is waste. This manor is one league long and 4 furlongs broad.

=== Change in location ===
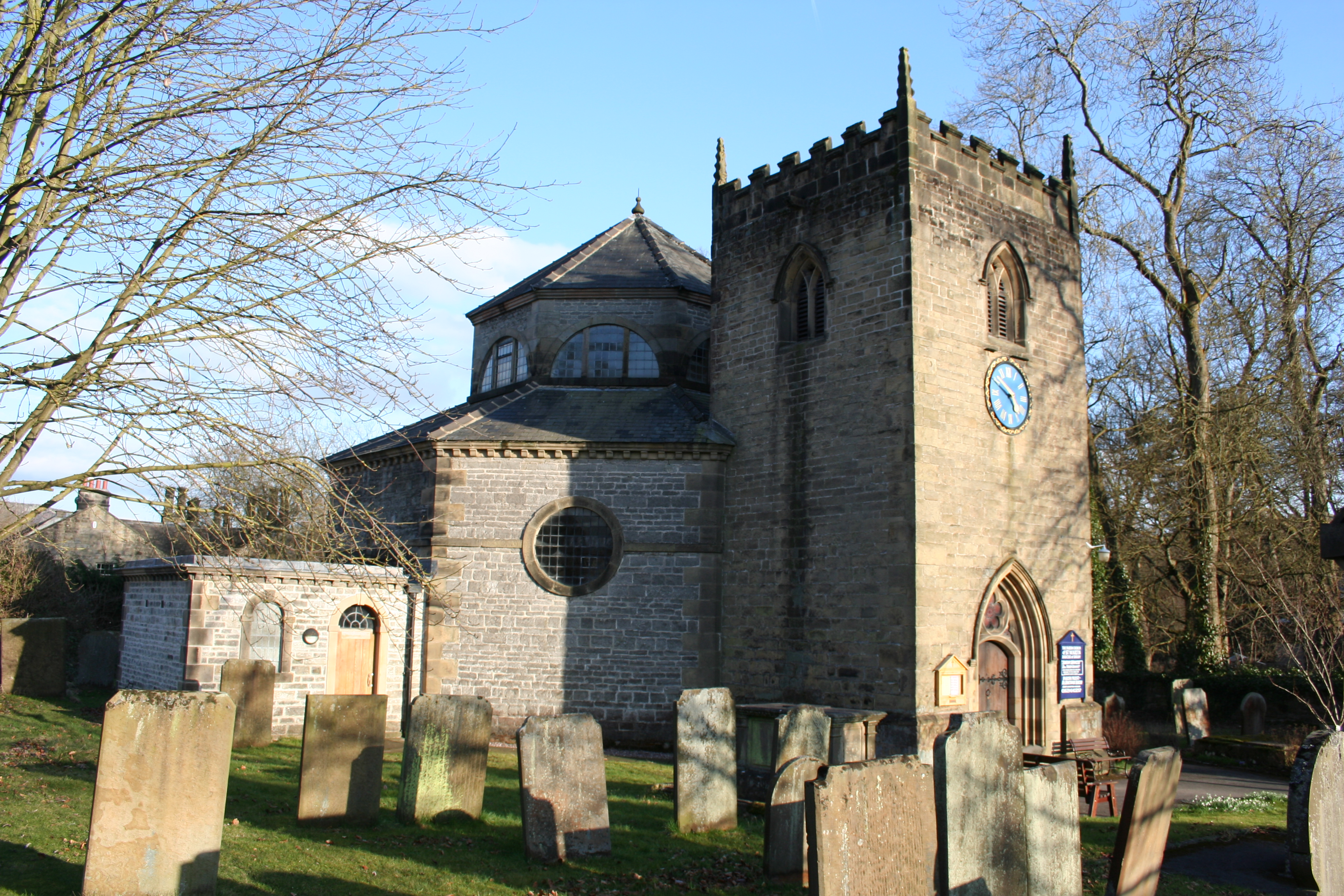
St Martin's Church

Local archaeologists and historians have speculated (since 1996) that the original location of the village, which was ravaged by the Black Death, may have been immediately to the south of the Old Hall, on a series of terraces (still visible from the public footpath overlooking the meadows between the lower, modern extension of the village and the bottom of the "Town" the hill by the Moon Inn which leads up to Stoney Middleton Junior School). Renewal of the village led to the construction of a stone chapel in the 15th century at the crossroads of the roads/tracks going between Eyam and Grindleford, which was dedicated to Saint Martin, perhaps to cater for pilgrims to the spring. The tower survives, attached to an unusual octagonal nave of 1759.

=== Modern history ===
During the Great Plague, the 17th-century villagers left food for those self-quarantined in nearby Eyam. Atop a cliff above Middleton Dale lies Lovers Leap, from which Hannah Baddeley jumped in 1762, but miraculously survived. She died two years later.

A road was blasted through Middleton Dale in 1830, and in 1840 an octagonal toll house was built in the village, now a fish and chip shop which stands opposite the Royal Oak public house. Other notable buildings include Middleton Hall. A primary school was built in 1835 by public subscription and is the meeting place for the Parish Council, the PTA, WI, Horticultural Society, Tennis Club, and other activities of the village. Despite a campaign by school governors, parents and friends, Derbyshire County Council voted at the Council Meeting on 12 December 2006 to propose the closure of Stoney Middleton school from 31 August 2007. This decision was, however, eventually over-ruled in May 2007. A cross by the main road is dated 1846. It was erected to mark the repeal of the Corn Laws. Several electric narrow-gauge railways were operated in Stoney Middleton by Laporte Industries Ltd up to 1987 for the mining of fluorite.

In January 2007, some houses in the village were damaged by a wall of mud caused by the failure of a dam near the top of the dale. The dam, which held a lagoon of mud and water from a local mineral quarry, burst following heavy rainfall. In May 2007, The Times newspaper reported that police had found a crystal meth factory in Stoney Middleton, in a rented industrial unit in the Rock Hill business park; it was the largest such facility discovered in the United Kingdom at the time.

=== Industry ===
In the dale were several quarries, once a major source of employment for the village. Footwear became a major industry, with an industrial boot factory (William Lennon) surviving to the present day. Lead mining also continued, with a Barmote Court alternating between Stoney Middleton and Eyam until the early 20th century. Darlton Quarry was bombed by two German Junkers Ju 88s during World War II; both aircraft being shot down as they returned home. A prisoner-of-war camp was situated at the bottom of the village and housed Italian prisoners (amongst others).

== Rock climbing ==
The Dale became a major centre for Peak District rock climbers in the 1960s and 1970s, initially developed by people like Jack Street, Geoff Birtles, and Tom Proctor, who in 1968 established one of the hardest climbs in the world at that time, Our Father (E4 6b) on Windy Buttress. Future British and international rock climbing stars such as Jerry Moffatt lived at the crag in an abandoned wooden shed, and established some of the hardest climbs in Britain, such as Helmut Schmitt (E6 6b), and Little Plum 8a (5.13b). There are currently over 477 rock climbs at the 50-metre high limestone crag.

== Attractions ==
The Lover's Leap café has for many years been a wet-weather retreat and refueling stop for cyclists, cavers, and climbers. The Moon Inn was a pub much frequented by the climbing fraternity and maintains the tradition today with a "muddy boots welcome" sign and Bed and Breakfast for walkers and climbers. In the 1980s the dale began to wane in popularity having been largely worked out by climbers as well as the quarrymen.

At the eastern end of the village, running from the warm water spring near the Roman Baths, the path known locally as Jacob's Ladder leads directly in front of the village cemetery and passes through Plantation Woods up to Eyam New Road. It affords views of Curbar and Froggat Edge, Coombs Dale, and a Bronze Age barrow over towards Deep Rake. In 2003, Derbyshire County Council reviewed the status of the path, classified as a Schedule D road; residents had petitioned for a change in the road's status, and the Trail Riders Fellowship petitioned against any change. The council decided to maintain the status of the road. As of March 2013, the designation of this route as a BOAT (Byway Open to All Traffic) was being contested by the parish council, who intended to apply for a Traffic Regulation Order to apply to the right-of-way.

A well dressing (a ceremony predating Christianity which now uses plant materials to decorate the well with – usually – Christian symbols) takes place annually in the village, usually spanning the last week in July and the first week in August.

== In film and television ==
The village was featured in the first episode of Most Haunted: Midsummer Murders in which the team investigates the death of a supposedly Scottish peddler and of Hannah Baddeley. Whilst investigating, they also conducted a vigil at the Moon Inn.

In the spring of 2021, production crews for the forthcoming Mission: Impossible – Dead Reckoning Part One film began to construct a set in a disused quarry near to the village. In August 2021 the scene, involving a locomotive crashing into the quarry, was filmed.

== See also ==
- Listed buildings in Stoney Middleton
