= Listed buildings in Stoney Middleton =

Stoney Middleton is a civil parish in the Derbyshire Dales district of Derbyshire, England. The parish contains 19 listed buildings that are recorded in the National Heritage List for England. Of these, one is listed at Grade II*, the middle of the three grades, and the others are at Grade II, the lowest grade. The parish contains the village of Stoney Middleton and the surrounding countryside. The listed buildings consist of houses, farmhouses, cottages and associated structures, a church and a tomb in the churchyard, a former malthouse, a bath house, a limekiln, a chapel, a milestone, a former toll house and a village cross.

== Key ==
Grade	Criteria
II*	Particularly important buildings of more than special interest
II	Buildings of national importance and special interest

== Buildings ==
Name and location	Photograph	Date	Notes	Grade
St Martin's Church; 53.27581°N 1.65400°W		15th century	The church was largely rebuilt in 1759, it was partly restored in 1861, and the vestry was added in 1880. The tower is in gritstone, the body of the church is in limestone with gritstone dressings, and the roofs are slated. The church consists of an octagonal nave with an ambulatory and a pyramidal roof, a projecting chancel bay, a north vestry, and a west tower. The tower has two stages, a pointed west doorway with a moulded surround, a traceried tympanum, and a hood mould, above which is a clock face. In the top stage are bell openings with Y-tracery, over which is an embattled parapet and crocketed corner pinnacles.	II*
Middleton Hall; 53.27578°N 1.65322°W	—	Early 17th century	A house that has been much altered, it is in gritstone on a plinth, with quoins, floor bands, a cornice partly moulded and partly coved, and a tile roof with moulded stone gable copings and plain kneelers. There are two storeys, a half-H shaped plan, and a south front of three bays. In the centre is a doorway with a moulded surround, and a segmental pediment on moulded brackets. The windows are mullioned or mullioned and transomed. On the east side, and curving to the south, is a walkway with fluted cast iron columns, and a stone entrance arch with a moulded gable and an elaborate finial. On the east front is a two-storey gabled porch and a doorway with a four-centred arched head, and to the north is a four-light transomed stair window.	II
Churchyard Tomb; 53.27570°N 1.65371°W		Mid-17th century (probable)	The tomb in the churchyard of St Martin's Church is a stone table tomb. On the east and west sides are semicircular-headed niches, the west niche containing an hour glass and two upturned armorial shields. The north and west sides have semicircular-headed niches with moulded arches, and on the top is a slab with a moulded edge and an illegible inscription.	II
Denham Cottage and outbuilding 53.27557°N 1.65465°W	—	17th century	The cottage and attached outbuilding are in gritstone, with quoins, and two storeys. The cottage on the right has a tile roof with stone gable copings and kneelers. There are two bays, and it contains mullioned windows with hood moulds. The outbuilding to the left has a stone slate roof and six bays, and contains two doorways, one with a quoined surround, and various other openings, some of which are blocked.	II
Pine View; 53.27527°N 1.65720°W	—	Late 17th century	A row of three cottages that were refashioned in the late 18th century. They are in limestone and gritstone, rendered on the front, with gritstone dressings, large quoins, and a stone slate roof. There are two storeys, and have doorways with flush surrounds, and mullioned windows containing casements. At the rear is a catslide roof over extensions.	II
Spa Cottage; 53.27608°N 1.65437°W	—	18th century	Two cottages combined into one, it is in limestone and gritstone with gritstone dressings, quoins, and a tile roof with a stone coped gable, moulded kneelers, and a ball finial. There are two storeys and three bays, the left bay projecting and gabled. In the right two bays is a central doorway with a flush surround and a pointed lintel, and the windows are replacements. The left bay has a doorway with a quoined surround, and the windows are mullioned.	II
The Old Malt House; 53.27581°N 1.65550°W	—	Late 18th century	The malthouse, later converted and used for other purposes, is in rendered stone with gritstone dressings, quoins and a slate roof. There are five storeys at the front and three at the rear, and three bays, the east bay recessed. On the front are a doorway and an arch, both with brick surrounds and segmental heads. To the right is an inserted archway, in the first floor is a doorway with a quoined surround converted into a window, and two-light mullioned windows. At the rear are similar windows, and a segmental archway with chamfered voussoirs, now infilled.	II
Roman Bath House; 53.27632°N 1.65383°W		1815	The bath house, which has been restored, is in gritstone. There is a single storey, and it consists of two parallel gabled ranges. Facing the road are two round-arched windows, and on the right return is a large square opening and a doorway with a flush surround.	II
3 The Nook; 53.27547°N 1.65521°W	—	Early 19th century	The house is in gritstone with a tile roof. There are three storeys and a single bay. The doorway has a flush surround and a bracketed stone hood, and to its right is a bootscraper. The windows are sashes, the ground floor window is mullioned with two lights, and in the upper floors the windows have a single light.	II
Brook Cottages; 53.27575°N 1.65531°W		Early 19th century	A warehouse converted into two cottages, one above the other, in 1970. They are in limestone with gritstone dressings, quoins, bands linking the lintels, and a slate roof with a stone coped gable and moulded kneeler to the east. There are two bays and each cottage has two storeys. To the west is a segmental archway, and the windows are casements.	II
Brook House; 53.27554°N 1.65517°W	—	Early 19th century	The house is in limestone with gritstone dressings, quoins, and a stone slate roof with a coped gable and plain kneelers. There are three storeys and three bays. The central doorway has a moulded surround and a bracketed hood. Above it is a sash window with a semicircular head, imposts and a keystone, to its left is a canted bay window, and the other windows are sashes with flush surrounds.	II
Highfields Farmhouse; 53.27331°N 1.67072°W	—	Early 19th century	The farmhouse is in gritstone with a tile roof, two storeys and three bays. The central doorway has a plain fanlight, and the windows are sashes with flush surrounds.	II
Limekiln; 53.27834°N 1.67810°W	—	Early 19th century	The limekiln at the western entrance to the quarry is in limestone, and in the shape of a large beehive. It is about 25 feet (7.6 m) high, and built partly into a hillside. The limekiln has a circular plan, with buttresses flanking the entrance, over which is a large lintel. Under the lintel, and recessed, is an arched entrance with voussoirs.	II
Wesleyan Reform Chapel; 53.27622°N 1.65674°W		1826	The chapel is in limestone with gritstone dressings, chamfered quoins, and a slate roof with a bellcote on the east gable. There are two storeys and three bays. In the centre is a doorway with a semicircular-arched head, a stepped architrave, imposts, a fanlight, and a raised double keystone. Above the doorway is a window with a semicircular head and a keystone, and the other windows have raised plain surrounds.	II
The Old Vicarage; 53.27319°N 1.65720°W	—	1836	The vicarage, later a private house, is in gritstone, with a sill band and a pyramidal slate roof. There are two storeys and three bays. The central doorway has pilasters and a plain entablature, and the windows are sashes.	II
Milestone; 53.27911°N 1.68594°W		c. 1840	The milestone on the south side of Middleton Dale (A623 road) is in gritstone. It consists of a slab with slightly splayed sides and a curved top. On the sides are inscribed the distances to Tideswell, Chapel-en-le-Frith, Manchester and Chesterfield.	II
Former toll house 53.27600°N 1.65702°W		1840	The toll house, later used for other purposes, is in gritstone with a hipped tile roof. There is a single storey, three bays, and an elongated octagonal plan. It contains a two-light window with a chamfered mullion and a doorway, both with a hood mould.	II
Village cross 53.27525°N 1.65547°W		1846	The cross standing at a road junction is in stone. It has a circular stone base, an octagonal plinth, and a tapering rectangular pier carrying a dated cross. The cross was erected to celebrate the Repeal of the Corn Laws.	II
Wall, steps and fountain, Middleton Hall; 53.27563°N 1.65321°W	—	19th century	The low retaining wall to the south of the house is in stone with slab copings, and links three flights of steps with banded balustrades. Flanking the tops and bottoms of the flights, and along the wall, are urns with gadrooned tops and bases on pedestals. From the central flight, a wall runs to the south and leads to a tufa bank with a shell fountain feeding a polygonal pond.	II
