= Listed buildings in Great Longstone =

Great Longstone is a civil parish in the Derbyshire Dales district of Derbyshire, England. The parish contains 31 listed buildings that are recorded in the National Heritage List for England. Of these, one is listed at Grade I, the highest of the three grades, one is at Grade II*, the middle grade, and the others are at Grade II, the lowest grade. The parish contains the village of Great Longstone and the surrounding area. Most of the listed buildings are houses, cottages and farmhouses and associated structures. Part of the gardens of Thornbridge Hall are in the parish, and these contain a number of listed buildings. The other listed buildings include a church, a cross in the churchyard, the village cross, two public houses, a former guidepost used as a gatepost, a former railway station, a war memorial, and a telephone kiosk.

== Key ==
| Grade | Criteria |
|---|---|
| I | Buildings of exceptional interest, sometimes considered to be internationally important |
| II* | Particularly important buildings of more than special interest |
| II | Buildings of national importance and special interest |

== Buildings ==
| Name and location | Photograph | Date | Notes | Grade |
|---|---|---|---|---|
| St Giles' Church, Longstone; 53.24387°N 1.70144°W | | 13th century | The church has been altered and extended through the centuries, and was restored in 1872–73 by R. Norman Shaw. It is built in limestone with gritstone dressings, lead roofs on the body of the church, and stone slate on the porch roof. The church consists of a nave with a clerestory, north and south aisles, a south porch, a chancel, and a west tower. The tower has three stages, string courses, bell openings in the upper two stages, clock faces, and an embattled parapet with corner crocketed pinnacles. | I |
| Village Cross; 53.24296°N 1.70339°W | | 15th century (probable) | The village cross on The Green is in gritstone. It consists of five circular steps, an octagonal base, a shaft, square at the bottom and rising to be octagonal, and a circular cap with a pyramidal top. | II |
| Churchyard Cross; 53.24370°N 1.70135°W | | 16th century (probable) | The cross in the churchyard of St Giles' Church is in gritstone. It has a square chamfered base on three steps. The shaft is tapering and octagonal, with a moulded cap and a 20th-century cross. | II |
| The Manor House; 53.24340°N 1.70454°W | — | 17th century | The house, which was later extended and altered, is in limestone with gritstone dressings, and stone slate roofs with coped gables and plain kneelers. There are two storeys and an east front of seven irregular bays. On the front are two canted bay windows and a porch approached by steps. The windows vary; some are mullioned, one also has a transom, some are sashes and one is set in a gabled dormer with a ball finial. | II |
| The Hall; 53.24426°N 1.70396°W | — | 17th century | A small country house that was expended in 1747 and restored by Hubert Worthington] in 1929. The earlier part is in limestone with gritstone dressings, and a stone slate roof with coped gables, moulded kneelers, and a ball finial. The later part is in limestone and brick with gritstone dressings, a cornice, and a coped parapet with ball finials. The house is in two and three storeys, with angle quoins, a front of three bays, and the lower earlier wing to the left. The doorway has rusticated pilasters and a moulded architrave, and the windows are sashes with moulded surrounds. In the earlier wing is a mullioned and transomed window with a moulded hood mould. | II* |
| Lower Stables, The Hall; 53.24404°N 1.70445°W | — | 17th century | The stable block is in limestone with gritstone dressings, quoins, and a stone slate roof with coped gables. There are two storeys, and the openings include doorways with quoined surrounds, a doorway with chamfered jambs and a keystone, mullioned windows, and vents. | II |
| Shakerley; 53.24327°N 1.70289°W | — | 1667 | A house, later a store, in limestone with gritstone dressings, quoins, and a stone slate roof with coped gables and moulded kneelers. There are two storeys, an L-shaped plan, and a gabled bay on the left. It contains windows of various types, a double cart entrance with a moulded initialled keystone, and a doorway with a moulded dated keystone. | II |
| Churchlady House, wall and gate piers 53.24310°N 1.70297°W | — | Early 18th century | A house in limestone with gritstone dressings, and a Welsh slate roof with coped gables and moulded kneelers. There are two storeys and an L-shaped plan, with four bays, the right bay projecting and gabled. In the left three bays are a single-light window, two-light mullioned windows, and a doorway, all with chamfered surrounds. The right bay has chamfered quoins, a string course, two-light mullioned windows, and in the gable is a datestone. The garden wall has moulded copings, and two square gate piers with moulded caps. | II |
| Gatepost; 53.25652°N 1.73160°W | — | 1737 | A guidepost, later used as a gatepost, it is in gritstone. It consists of a square block about 3 feet (0.91 m) high with a flat top. The post is inscribed with the date and "BAKEWELL ROAD". | II |
| Gate piers, walls, pump and trough, The Hall; 53.24354°N 1.70413°W | — | Mid 18th century | The gate piers at the south entrance to The Hall are in stone, square and rusticated, with moulded caps and ball finials, and the flanking walls are about 10 feet (3.0 m) high with chamfered copings. The wall to the east contains a doorway with rusticated quoins to the south, and a moulded architrave and a keystone to the north. To the west are a pair of gate piers at the entrance to the stable yard, a fluted metal pump, and a stone trough. | II |
| The Cottage; 53.24610°N 1.70717°W | — | 1765 | A house in limestone with gritstone dressings, quoins, and a stone slate roof with coped gables and moulded kneelers. There are two storeys and five bays. On the front are two canted bay windows, two doorways, one with a moulded surround and a hood mould, sash windows, and a datestone. | II |
| Crispin Inn; 53.24306°N 1.70403°W | | Late 18th century | The public house, which was extended in 1887, is in limestone, the earlier part rendered, with gritstone dressings, and a Welsh slate roof with coped gables, moulded kneelers, and ridge cresting tiles to the extension. There are two storeys, the earlier part has three bays, and the extension forms a projecting gabled bay on the right. On the earlier part is an open gabled wooden porch flanked by mullioned windows, and in the upper floor are sash windows in gabled dormers with fretted bargeboards. The right bay has quoins, a doorway with a bracketed hood, tripartite mullioned windows, and a datestone. | II |
| Stone Croft, Cuckoo Cottage and the Little House; 53.24279°N 1.70210°W | — | Late 18th century | A row of three cottages in limestone with gritstone dressings, quoins, and a tile roof with coped gables and moulded kneelers. There are three storeys, and each cottage has one bay. The doorways have stone surrounds, and the windows are top-hung casements with flat heads, other than the upper two windows in the right bay, which have segmental heads. | II |
| The Farm; 53.24388°N 1.70519°W | — | Late 18th century | The farmhouse is in limestone with gritstone dressings, quoins, and a roof of Welsh slate on the south and stone slate to the north, with coped gables and moulded kneelers. There are two storeys, an L-shaped plan, and a front of three bays. The doorway has a flush surround and a hood mould, and the windows on the front are sashes. At the rear are mullioned windows and a tall stair window. | II |
| Gates and gate piers, The Manor House; 53.24329°N 1.70389°W | — | Late 18th century | The gate piers are in gritstone, and are square and rusticated. Each pier has a fluted frieze, a moulded cap, and a ball finial. The gates are wooden, with wrought iron work. | II |
| White Lion; 53.24254°N 1.70206°W | | Late 18th century | The public house is limestone with gritstone dressings and a tile roof. There are two storeys and a symmetrical front of five bays. Steps lead up to the central doorway that has a moulded surround and a bracketed hood. The windows are sashes, those in the ground floor are tripartite. | II |
| Ash House; 53.24261°N 1.70236°W | — | Early 19th century | The house is in limestone with gritstone dressings and a Welsh slate roof. There are two storeys and two bays. The central doorway has a moulded hood mould, to its left is a flat-roofed bay window, and the other windows are sashes. | II |
| Laburnum House; 53.24275°N 1.70173°W | — | Early 19th century | The house is rendered, and has a Welsh slate roof with coped gables and plain kneelers. There are two storeys and two bays, with a recessed two-bay wing on the left. The central doorway has a flush surround and a bracketed hood, and the windows are sashes. | II |
| Rose Cottage and Spring Bank; 53.24215°N 1.70070°W | — | Early 19th century | Three cottages, later two, in limestone with gritstone dressings, quoins, and a Welsh slate roof with coped gables and moulded kneelers. There are two storeys and three bays. On the front are doorways, one of which has a moulded hood mould and is blocked. Most of the windows are top-hung casements. | II |
| Upper Stables, The Hall; 53.24410°N 1.70479°W | — | Early 19th century | The stables are in limestone with gritstone dressings, quoins, a tile roof, and two storeys. In the centre is a doorway with a quoined surround, to its left is a cart entrance with an almost round-arched head, and elsewhere are mullioned windows. | II |
| The Hollies, gate piers and wall 53.24293°N 1.70257°W | — | Early 19th century | The house is in limestone with gritstone dressings and a Welsh slate roof. There are two storeys and three bays. The central doorway has a moulded surround and a bracketed hood, and the windows are mullioned, containing two sashes. In front of the garden is a coped wall, and gate piers with moulded caps. | II |
| The Vicarage; 53.24346°N 1.70136°W | | Early 19th century | The vicarage, which was later extended, is in limestone and gritstone, with quoins, and a stone slate roof with coped gables and plain kneelers. There are two storeys and three bays, the right bay being a later two-storey canted bay window with a coped parapet. In the centre is a doorway with a semicircular fanlight, and the windows are sashes. | II |
| Downside; 53.23645°N 1.70524°W | | 1863 | A railway station converted for residential use, it is in stone with Welsh slate roofs, and gables with fretted bargeboards and finials. There are one and two storeys and a north front of four bays, containing a doorway and a window, each with a pointed segmental arch, and three-light casement windows with chamfered surrounds. On the south front is a three-bay platform canopy on four columns with curved brackets. | II |
| Boundary wall, Thornbridge Hall; 53.23643°N 1.70492°W | — | Late 19th century | The boundary wall is a dry stone wall in limestone and gritstone with chamfered copings. It extends for about 45 yards (41 m), and in the angle is a pier with a ball finial. | II |
| Fountain and urns, Thornbridge Hall; 53.23585°N 1.70269°W | — | Late 19th century | The fountain in the gardens of the hall is enclosed within a quatrefoil, and is in stone. It is circular and has two tiers with fluted bases. At each angle of the quatrefoil is a square pedestal surmounted by an urn with swags, acanthus decoration, and a domed top. | II |
| Four Hermes, Thornbridge Hall; 53.23553°N 1.70302°W | — | Late 19th century | In the gardens of the hall are four stone Hermes, each depicting a season of the year, standing on square pedestals with stepped bases. On the pedestals are carved reliefs of the season, and its name in Greek. | II |
| Retaining wall and grottos, Thornbridge Hall; 53.23533°N 1.70356°W | — | Late 19th century | The retaining wall in the gardens is about 90 yards (82 m) long, and has seven urns on rusticated piers. At the south end is an urn on a polygonal table and an embattled grotto in tufa. Steps lead to a lower level, where there is a stone bench carved with festoons of fruit. | II |
| Two Temples, Thornbridge Hall; 53.23612°N 1.70238°W | — | Late 19th century | The two temples in the gardens of the hall are in gritstone, and both have a square plan, a flat roof, and contain paired Ionic columns. The north temple is open on all sides and is surmounted by a coat of arms and a balustraded parapet, and the south temple has a solid back wall with coupled Ionic pilasters. | II |
| North Lodge, gate and gate piers, Thornbridge Hall; 53.23594°N 1.70480°W | — | c. 1897 | The lodge is in limestone with gritstone dressings, partly rendered, with applied timber framing, and tile roofs with coped gables, moulded kneelers, and ball finials. It is in one and two storeys and has an irregular plan. The central doorway has a moulded surround and a bracketed hood, to its right is a small circular window, and a gabled bay with mullioned windows and chamfered string courses. To the left is a polygonal bay window on the corner, and on the west front is a canted bay window. Attached to the south of the house are square gate piers, the left one with an urn, and a wrought iron gate. | II |
| War Memorial; 53.24284°N 1.70301°W | | 1923 | The war memorial is in gritstone, and consists of a square pier with a stepped base and tapering body, and a moulded cornice at the top with foliage decoration. The faces of the pier are inscribed with the names of those lost in the two World Wars. The memorial is surrounded by eight obelisks linked by metal chains. | II |
| Telephone kiosk 53.24309°N 1.70318°W | — | 1935 | The K6 type telephone kiosk was designed by Giles Gilbert Scott. Constructed in cast iron with a square plan and a dome, it has three unperforated crowns in the top panels. | II |
