= St Giles' Church, Longstone =

Church in Derbyshire, England

St Giles’ Church, Longstone
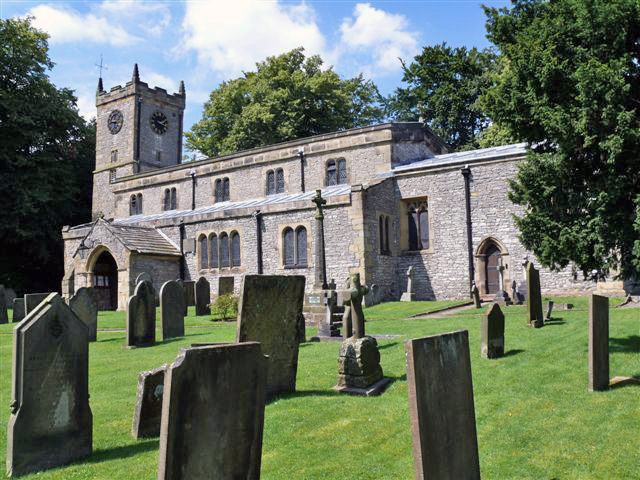
- St Giles’ Church, Longstone (photograph by Bob Abell)
- St Giles’ Church, Longstone
- 53°14′34.26″N 1°42′3.66″W
- OS grid reference: SK 20021 71910
- Location: Great Longstone
- Country: England
- Denomination: Church of England

History
- Dedication: St Giles

Architecture
- Heritage designation: Grade I listed

Administration
- Diocese: Diocese of Derby
- Archdeaconry: Chesterfield
- Deanery: Bakewell and Eyam
- Parish: Longstone St Giles

St Giles’ Church, Longstone (also known as St Giles' Church, Great Longstone) is a Grade I listed parish church in the Church of England in Great Longstone, Derbyshire.

== History ==
The church dates from the 13th century with 14th and 16th century additions. It was restored between 1872 and 1873 by Richard Norman Shaw. The church was restored sensitively with much re-use of original material as possible. The levels of floor throughout were re-arranged, and the church seated with open oak seats. New choir stalls were placed in the chancel, and a low stone screen of simple character was erected between the chancel and the nave. A new vestry and organ chamber was provided. The contractors for the restoration work were Joseph Brown and Co. Stained glass windows designed by Richard Norman Shaw were constructed by Heaton, Butler and Bayne. The bells were cast by Taylor of Loughborough, and the tower clock provided by Smiths of Derby. The church reopened on 22 September 1873

== Parish status ==
The church is in a joint parish with

- All Saints' Church, Curbar
- St Martin's Church, Stoney Middleton
- The Good Shepherd Church, Wardlow

== Organ ==
The church contains a pipe organ by Chappell and Co dating from 1873. A specification of the organ can be found on the National Pipe Organ Register.

== See also ==
- Grade I listed churches in Derbyshire
- Grade I listed buildings in Derbyshire
- Listed buildings in Great Longstone
