= All Saints' Church, Curbar =

All Saints’ Church, Curbar
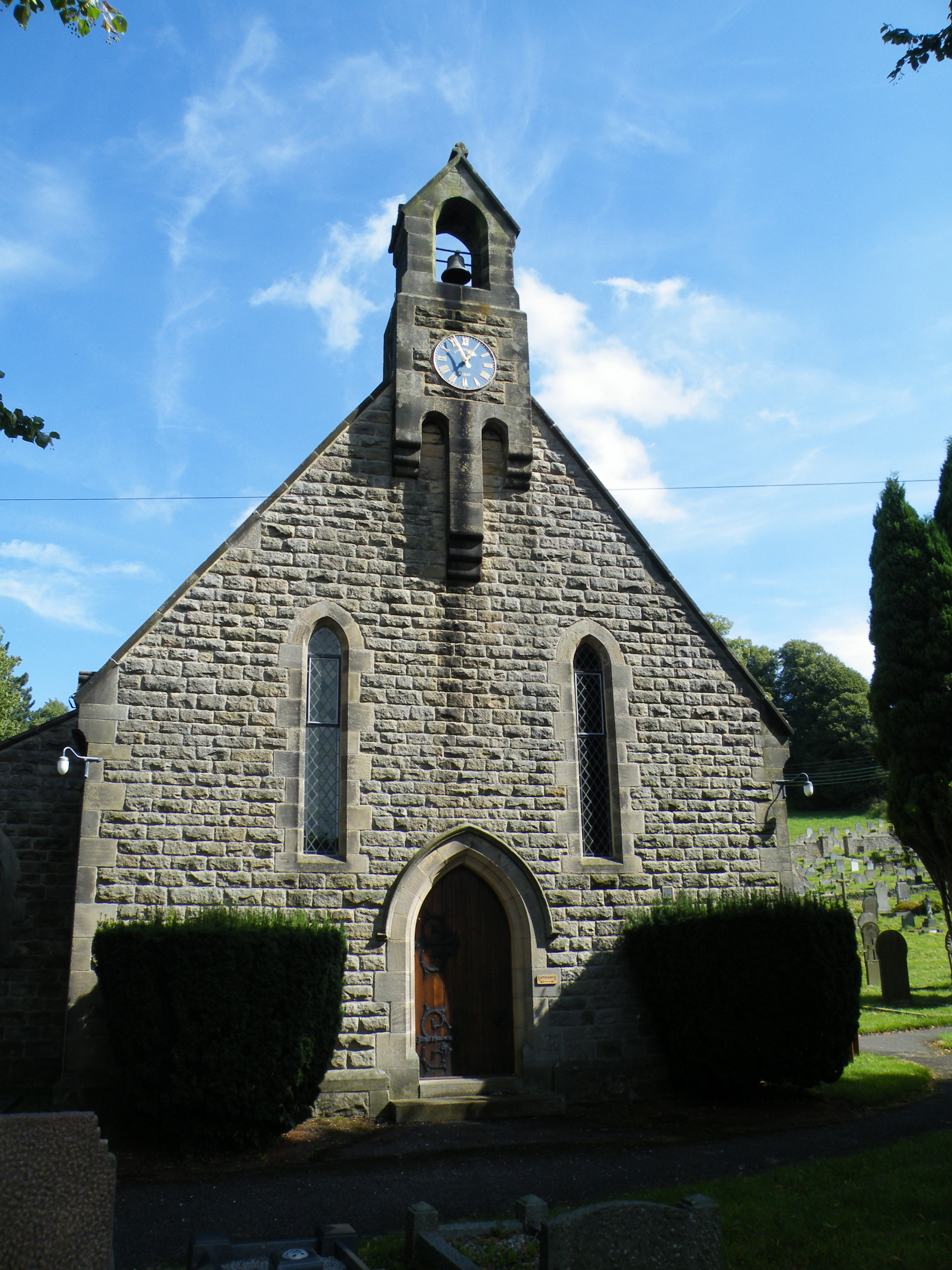
- All Saints’ Church, Curbar

- Location within Derbyshire
- 53°15′56.39″N 1°37′52.65″W
- OS grid reference: SK 24689 74357
- Location: Curbar, Derbyshire
- Country: England
- Denomination: Church of England

History
- Dedication: All Saints

Administration
- Diocese: Diocese of Derby
- Archdeaconry: Chesterfield
- Deanery: Bakewell & Eyam
- Parish: Curbar

All Saints’ Church, Curbar is a Church of England parish church in Curbar, Derbyshire.

== History ==
Until the church was built, the nearest parish church for the residents of Calver and Curbar was Baslow, some 2 miles away. Services were held locally in a loft over the cotton mill in Calver, but by 1867, funds were raised for the construction of a church. The foundation stone was laid by William Cavendish, 7th Duke of Devonshire in April 1867. The land for the church was given by Charles Manners, 6th Duke of Rutland. The church was designed by Anthony Salvin, and built by Mr. Ashwell of London. The church was consecrated by the Bishop of Lichfield, Rt Revd. George Selwyn on 2 June 1868.

== Parish status ==
The church is in a joint parish with

- St Giles' Church, Longstone
- The Good Shepherd Church, Wardlow
- St Martin's Church, Stoney Middleton

== Organ ==
A new organ was installed in 1905 by Cousans, Sons and Company. A specification of the organ can be found on the National Pipe Organ Register.
