= Longstone Edge =

Ridge in Derbyshire, England

Coordinates: 53.259°N 1.684°W

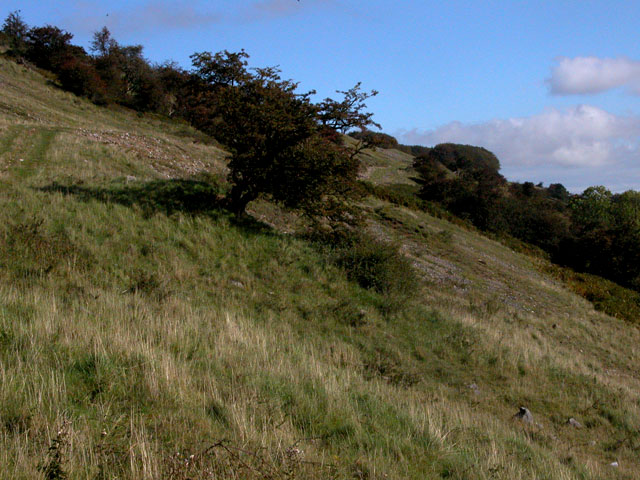

- Location within Derbyshire
- OS grid reference: SK217735
- District: Derbyshire Dales
- Shire county: Derbyshire
- Region: East Midlands
- Country: England
- Sovereign state: United Kingdom
- Post town: BAKEWELL
- Police: Derbyshire
- Fire: Derbyshire
- Ambulance: East Midlands

Longstone Edge is a limestone ridge in the Peak District National Park, in Derbyshire, England.

Longstone Edge is immediately north of the village of Great Longstone, which is in turn about 3 kilometres (1.9 mi) north of the town of Bakewell. It runs from east to west for about 6 kilometres (3.7 mi), from the village of Calver to the River Wye at Monsal Dale and is about 1 kilometre (0.62 mi) wide. It rises to about 395 metres (1,296 ft) and commands far-reaching views over the Peak District.

== Quarrying ==
The Edge has been, and is, intensively quarried for galena, fluorspar and barytes, and more controversially, limestone. Since Longstone Edge is a noted beauty spot within the Peak District National Park, there is strong local pressure for the quarrying to stop altogether. Some of this quarrying is strictly controlled by the Peak District National Park Authority, but the Authority conducted a lengthy legal battle to try to stop other quarries (at Backdale and Wager's Flat) that were operating outside of the authority's guidelines.

In February 2008 the High Court ruled in favour of landowner Bleaklow Industries Ltd, and quarrying at Backdale quarry resumed. The Peak District National Park Authority won permission to appeal against that High Court decision. In the meantime, a consortium of pressure groups campaigned to have the Government buy out the old mineral mining permissions from the landowner.

On 10/11 February 2009 the previous High Court ruling in favour of the landowner and operator of Backdale Quarry was overturned by three appeal judges and, although it still allowed the quarrying to continue, the ruling ensured that the original 1952 permission would be interpreted correctly, with the emphasis on fluorspar rather than limestone.

Bleaklow Industries requested leave to appeal, but this request was denied on 25 June 2009. The operator of Backdale Quarry, MMC Minerals (Midlands) Ltd, was ordered by an HMRC tribunal on 9 April 2009 to pay aggregate duty for the hundreds of thousands of tonnes of limestone it had illegally removed from Longstone Edge. In July 2009 quarrying ceased at Backdale Quarry, and the machinery was removed. Bleaklow Industries own other land on Longstone Edge that is covered by 1952 permissions.
