= Listed buildings in Curbar =

Curbar is a civil parish in the Derbyshire Dales district of Derbyshire, England. The parish contains nine listed buildings that are recorded in the National Heritage List for England. All the listed buildings are designated at Grade II, the lowest of the three grades, which is applied to "buildings of national importance and special interest". The parish contains the village of Curbar and the surrounding area. The listed buildings consist of houses, cottages and associated structures, a public house, a lock-up, a group of water troughs and millstones, a weir on the River Derwent, and a chapel.

== Buildings ==
Name and location	Photograph	Date	Notes
The Chequers Inn and outbuildings 53.28141°N 1.63125°W		Mid 18th century	The public house and outbuildings are in gritstone with quoins, and stone slate roofs with coped gables and moulded kneelers. There are two storeys and three ranges. The left range is roughcast, and has four bays, the left bay recessed. The doorway has a rectangular fanlight with Gothic glazing, and the windows vary; some are mullioned and others are replacement casements. The middle range has three bays, and a central doorway with a quoined surround, a massive lintel and a shallow bracketed hood. The window above the doorway has a semicircular head, and the other windows are sashes or casements, some mullioned. The right range is lower and contains two doorways and a window.
Cottage to the west of Stone Edge and wall 53.26806°N 1.61900°W	—	Late 18th century	A pair of cottages, later combined, in gritstone with quoins and a Welsh slate roof. There are two storeys, three bays, and a lean-to on the left. In the centre are coupled doorways with massive jambs and lintels, the left doorway blocked and a window inserted. The other windows are mullioned with two lights, and contain casements. The boundary wall to the south is formed by vertical flagstones.
Lock-up; 53.26645°N 1.61993°W		Late 18th century	The lock-up is in gritstone with a conical roof. It has a square plan, a single bay, and two storeys. The doorway has a massive surround, and there are square window openings.
Springwell Cottage; 53.26908°N 1.62533°W	—	Late 18th century	A gritstone house with quoins, and a tile roof. There are two storeys and four bays. The central doorway has massive jambs and a lintel, and the windows are mullioned with two lights, and contain casements.
The Mullions; 53.26948°N 1.62535°W	—	Late 18th century	A house in gritstone with a stone slate roof. There are two storeys, a double depth plan, two bays, and an added bay angled on the left. The central doorway has massive jambs, and a shallow pointed arch to the lintel soffit. The windows are mullioned, with two pointed lights. The added bay has a parapet, and contains single-light windows with pointed heads.
Cliff House; 53.26248°N 1.62852°W	—	Early 19th century	The house is in gritstone with quoins, sill bands, an eaves cornice, a parapet, and a hipped tile roof. There are three storeys and three bays. In the centre is a portico with Doric columns, a moulded projecting cornice, and an open parapet with a balustrade, and a doorway with a moulded architrave and a shallow bracketed hood. The windows are sashes, the central window in the middle floor with a cornice on brackets.
Water troughs and millstones 53.26901°N 1.62508°W		Early 19th century	An area by a crossroads containing two stone horse troughs, one of which is circular and has an overflow. The other is rectangular, and has a canopy of gritstone blocks, and a gabled front containing two openings with pointed arches. In front of it are vertical stone slabs, and around the perimeter of the area are massive millstones set into the ground to half their depth.
Weir east of New Bridge; 53.27419°N 1.63328°W		Early 19th century	The weir in the River Derwent is in stone, and has a reverse-S shape. There is a massive embankment with a shallow saddleback to the peak of the weir, and an incline to river level lined with coursed squared gritstone blocks.
Wesleyan Chapel; 53.26799°N 1.62484°W	—	1861	The chapel is in gritstone, and has a Welsh slate roof with coped gables and moulded kneelers. There is a single storey and two bays. In the centre is a projecting gabled porch and a doorway with a massive surround. The windows are rectangular with leaded glazing.
