= Middleton Hall, Stoney Middleton =

Building in Stoney Middleton, Derbyshire, England

Coordinates: 53.2756°N 1.6532°W

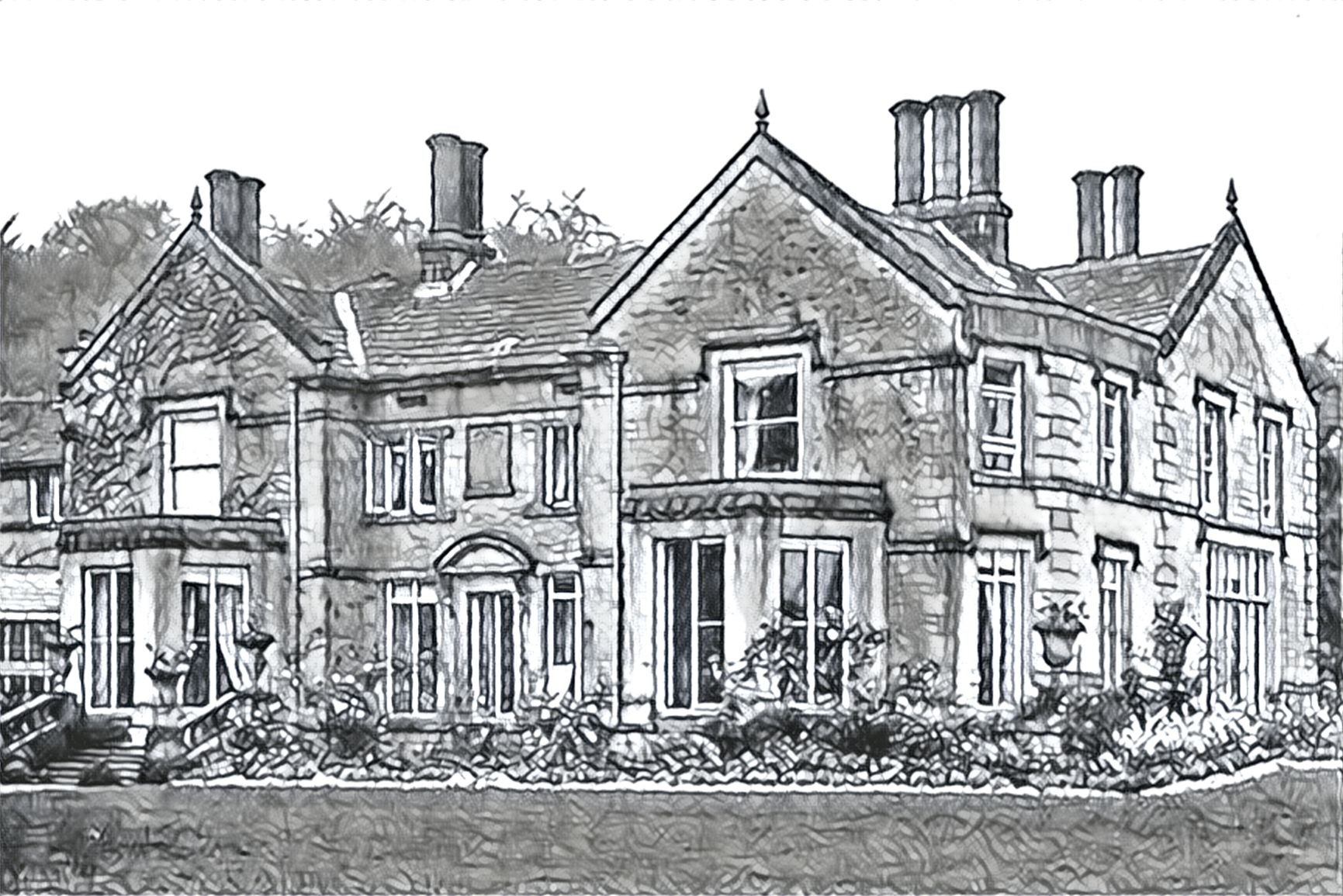
Middleton Hall

Middleton Hall is a restored 17th-century country house at Stoney Middleton, Derbyshire. It is a Grade II listed building.

The house was built in the mid-17th century for Robert Ashton (who was High Sheriff of Derbyshire in 1665) whose son sold it to Edward Finney (High Sheriff) in 1690. Finney's daughter and, in 1790 his heir, married Joseph Denman MD of Bakewell, on whose death the property passed to his nephew Thomas Denman, who was Lord Chief Justice, 1832–50. see Baron Denman.

The house was let out to tenants from 1817 to 1830 but Denman retook possession and altered and extended the house. The Denmans remained in ownership until the fifth Baron sold the estate in 1953. The house stood empty and neglected for almost 25 years. In 1977 it was resold, the 19th-century alterations and additions were largely demolished and the house was restored to its 16th-century appearance.

== See also ==
- Listed buildings in Stoney Middleton
