= Marcelle Barbey-Gampert =

Swiss botanist (1887-1949)

Marcelle Barbey-Gampert (1895–1987) was a Swiss botanist, geologist, and climatologist noted for phytogeographical studies of the Picos de Europa. The standard author abbreviation Barb.-Gamp. is used to indicate this person as the author when citing a botanical name.

== Works ==
Barbey-Gampert, M. (1921). "Esquisse de la Flore des Picos de Europa". Bull. Soc. Bot. Genève. Série 2. 12: 220–245.
