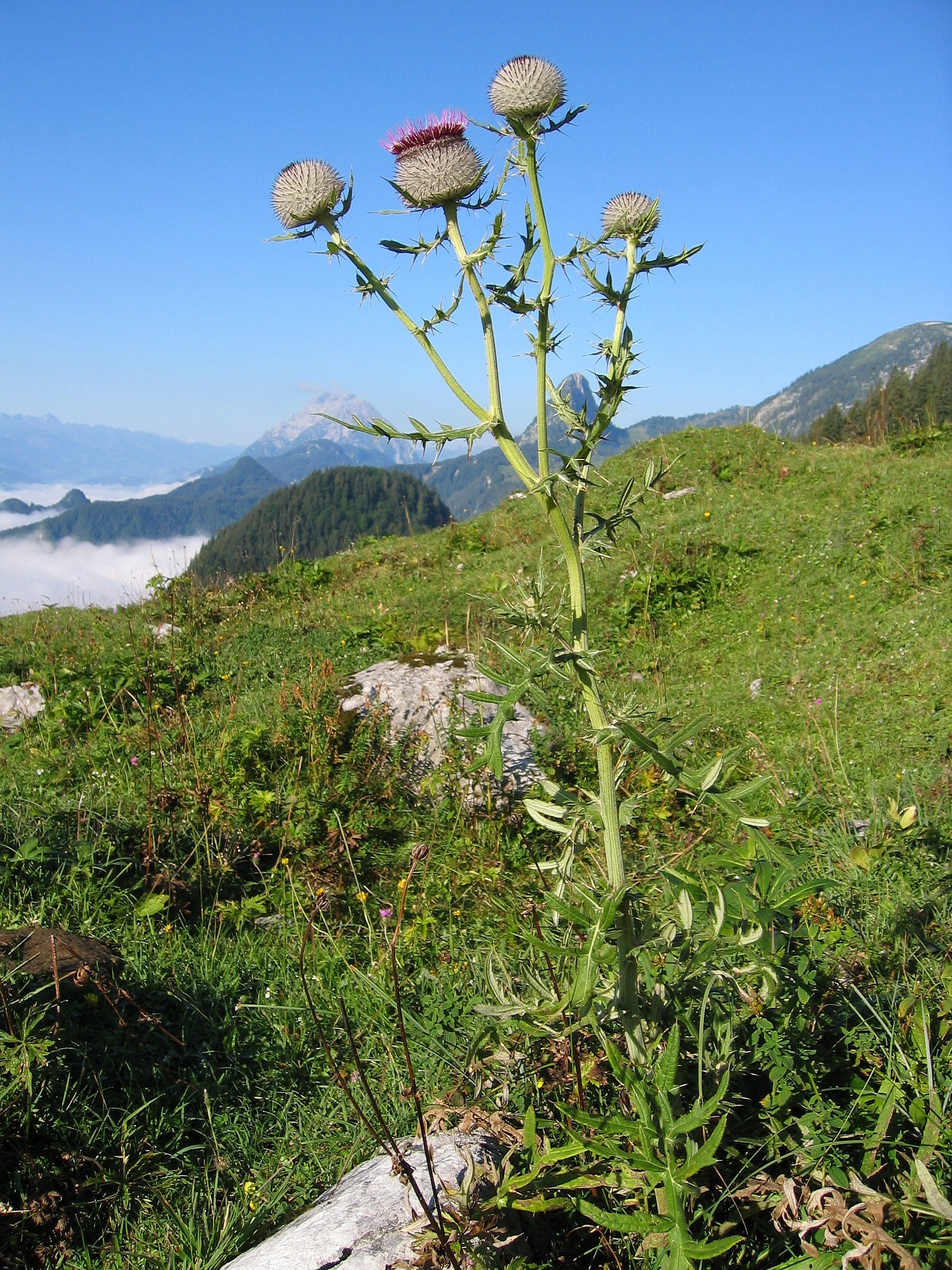

Scientific classification
- Kingdom: Plantae
- Clade: Embryophytes
- Clade: Tracheophytes
- Clade: Spermatophytes
- Clade: Angiosperms
- Clade: Eudicots
- Clade: Asterids
- Order: Asterales
- Family: Asteraceae
- Genus: Cirsium
- Species: C. eriophorum

Binomial name
- Cirsium eriophorum (L.) Scop.

Synonyms
- Synonymy: Carduus eriophorus L.; Carduus spurius L.; Carthamus ferox Lam.; Cirsium chatenieri Legrand; Cirsium chodatii Barb.-Gamp.; Cirsium dinaricum Vandas; Cirsium eriocephalum Wallr.; Cirsium insubricum Moretti ex Bertol.; Cirsium oviforme Gand.; Cirsium proponticum Griseb.; Cirsium vandasii Petr.; Cirsium velenowskyi Vandas; Cnicus cinaroides Sm.; Cnicus eriophorus (L.) Roth; Cnicus spinosissimus M.Bieb.; Epitrachys propontica K.Koch

= Cirsium eriophorum =

Species of plant

Cirsium eriophorum, the woolly thistle, is a herbaceous biennial species of flowering plant in the genus Cirsium of the family Asteraceae. It is widespread across much of Europe. It is a large biennial plant with sharp spines on the tips of the leaves, and long, woolly hairs on much of the foliage. The flower heads are large and nearly spherical, with spines on the outside and many purple disc florets but no ray florets.

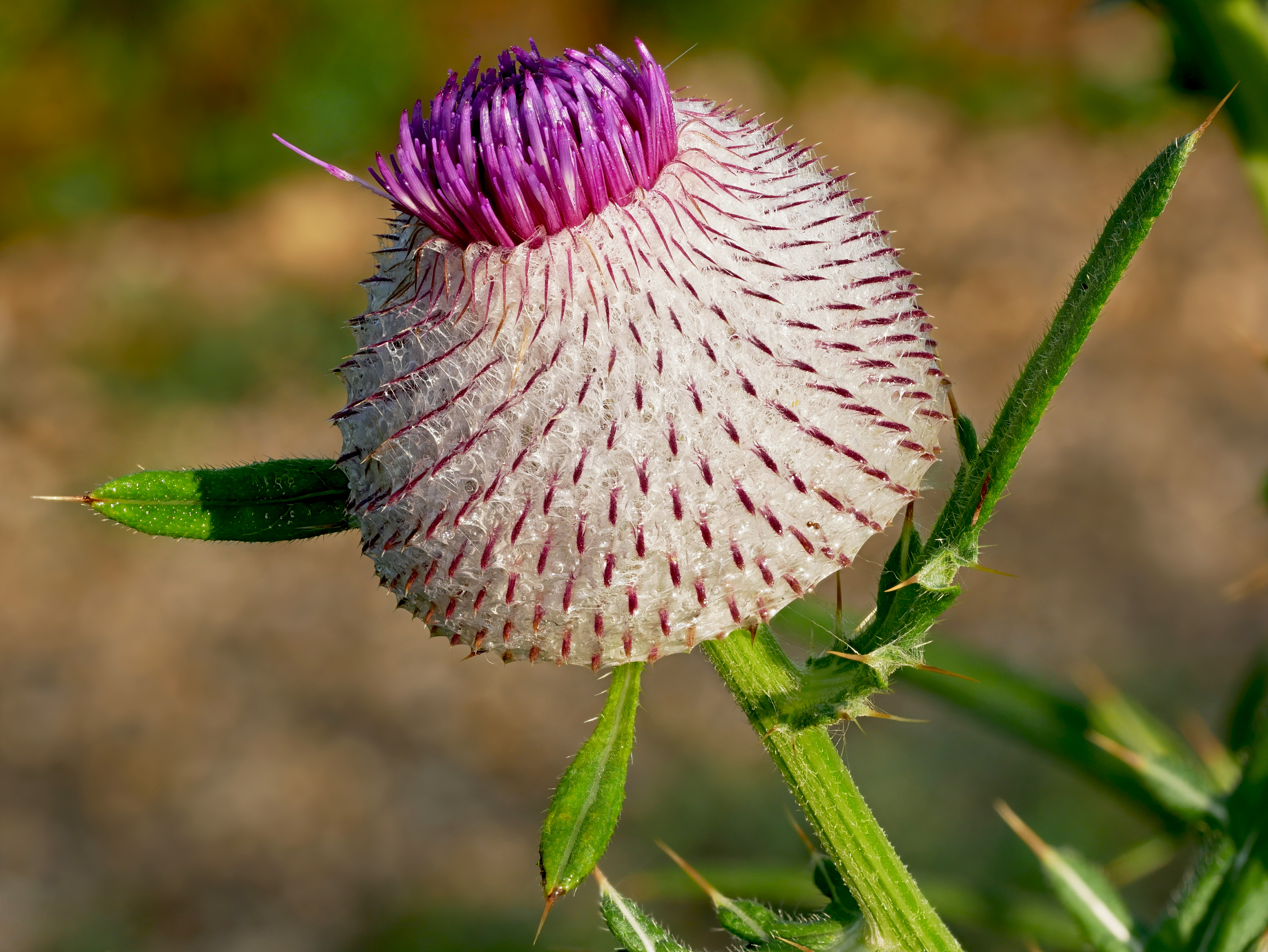
Flower head of C. eriophorum in Kozara National Park, Republika Srpska, Bosnia and Herzegovina

== Description ==
A tall, biennial plant, C. eriophorum reaches heights of 50 to 150 cm (20 to 60 in). The strong, branched stem is densely woolly hairy but has no wings. The stiff leaves are usually pinnate with strong, yellow spines; the lowest leaves are up to 80 cm (30 in) long. The leaf margins are rolled over and the underside of the leaf is felted with white hair. The inflorescence is cymose with a few large flowers with a diameter of up to 7 cm (3 in). These are globular and densely covered with woolly hair. They contain many tubular florets, with long purple tubes and purple stamens, each with a spiny bract covered with white wool through which a spine projects. The flowers are rich in nectar and attract bees, flies, beetles, butterflies and moths.

== Distribution and habitat ==
Cirsium eriophorum has a Central and Western Europe distribution. Its range extends from Upper Volga and the Balkans to the Netherlands, France and Britain. It typically grows in grassland, scrubland and open woodland on chalk, limestone or alkaline clay soils, including the disturbed ground caused by quarrying. In Britain, it grows up to about 310 m (1,000 ft) and is largely confined to central and southern England.

== Uses ==
The young leaves of C. eriophorum can be eaten raw, and the young stems can be peeled and eaten raw or cooked, after being soaked in water to remove their bitterness. The flower buds can be used in a similar way to artichokes but smaller, and an edible oil can be extracted from the seeds. The pappus can be used as tinder for lighting fires.

The plant is hardy and can be easily grown in a sunny position in the garden, in a wildflower meadow or in dappled shade in a woodland garden. It flowers between July and September.
