= Longstone Moor =

Protected area in Derbyshire, England

Coordinates: 53.258157°N 1.7121528°W

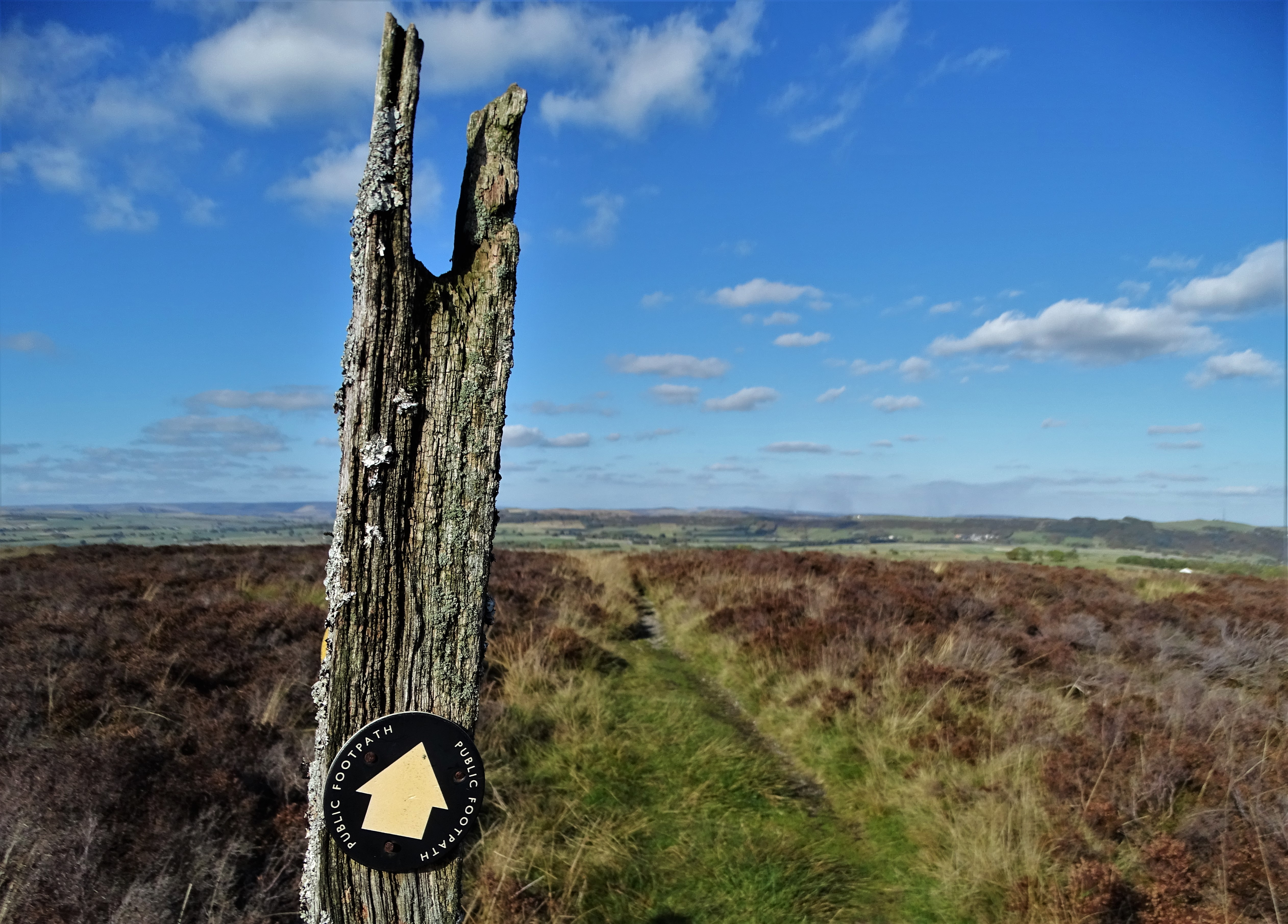
Path over Longstone Moor

Longstone Moor is a Site of Special Scientific Interest within Peak District National Park in Derbyshire, England. It is located 1.6 km (0.99 mi) northeast of the village of Little Longstone. This area is protected because of the heathland present on a limestone plateau. Soils can be deep and composed of loess.

== Biology ==
Plants on the heathland include heather, bilberry, heath bedstraw, tormentill. On the calcareous grasslands, plants include common rock rose. In some areas, debris from lead mines result in soil with heavy metals where plants include spring sandwort, wild thyme, autumn gentian and early-purple orchid.

There are ponds present on Longstone Moor where plant species include floating sweet-grass, jointed rush, common spike-rush and lesser spearwort. The great crested newt has been recorded here.

Lichen species on Longstone Moor include Centraria islandica and species from the genus Cladonia.
