= Calver =

Village in Derbyshire, England

Coordinates: 53.267°N 1.640°W

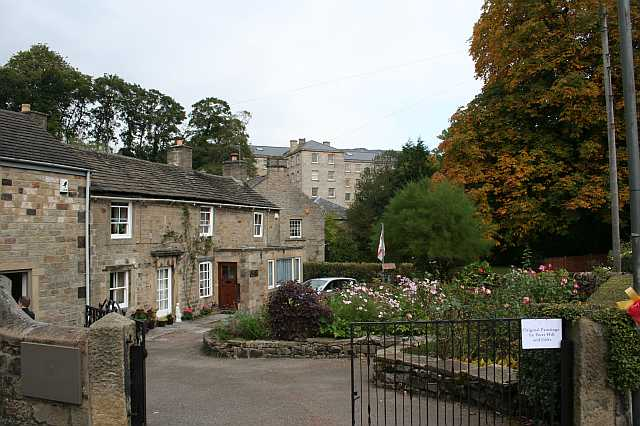
- Calver, with mill in background

- Location within Derbyshire
- Population: 710 (2011)
- OS grid reference: SK240745
- District: Derbyshire Dales
- Shire county: Derbyshire
- Region: East Midlands
- Country: England
- Sovereign state: United Kingdom
- Post town: HOPE VALLEY
- Postcode district: S32
- Dialling code: 01433
- Police: Derbyshire
- Fire: Derbyshire
- Ambulance: East Midlands
- UK Parliament: Derbyshire Dales

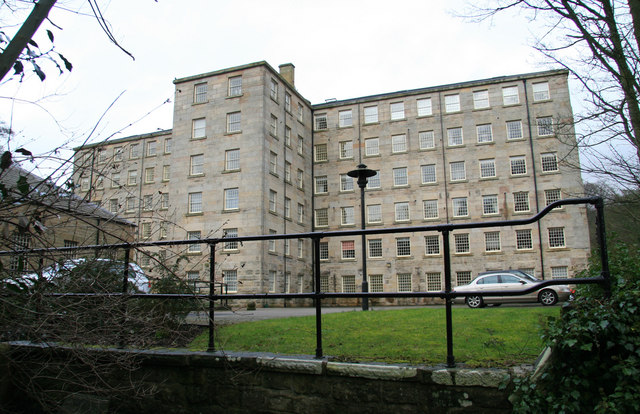
Calver Mill, a 6-storey textile mill of 1803–04, now converted to apartments.

Calver (Old English Calf Slope) is a village and civil parish in Derbyshire, England. The population of the civil parish at the 2011 census was 710.

== Overview ==
Calver is a small village situated in the Derwent Valley, Derbyshire. The village is bordered by the River Derwent and intersected by the A623 trunk road, responsible for carrying traffic between Manchester to the west, Sheffield to the north and Chesterfield to the east.

Stoke Hall is nearby.

Today, the village's buildings are predominantly residential, but some local enterprises, including a craft centre, petrol station and shop, garage, gallery, cafe and three pubs remain. It is also home to Cliff College, which was founded in 1883. There are two camp sites in Calver and many walkers visit the area.

== Historic mills ==
The village is the site of an historic cotton mill opened in 1778 by John Gardom of Bakewell and John Pares of Leicester in place of a corn mill at leased from Thomas Eyre of Hassop.

By 1785 the mill had been developed and stood at three-storeys. In 1799, however, the River Derwent washed away Calver Bridge and took part of the mill with it; shortly after this event, the mill was burned to the ground. A new mill was subsequently constructed, and began production in 1804. By 1830 it employed 200 workers and in 1833 new, larger, water wheels were constructed.

Spinning finished in 1923, but during the Second World War the mill was used as a storage depot and as a plant for crushing and washing fluorspar used in steelmaking. In 1947 the mill was bought by W & G Sissons to produce stainless steel holloware.

The water wheels have disappeared, though their housings still exist and the building has been restored for use as apartments.

The village was also the home to a corn mill, also called Calver Mill. It was constructed in the mid eighteen hundreds on the site of a smelting mill. The pitchback wheel was about 5m in diameter and 1.7m in width. The millpond may have had various sources, including water in Calver sough extracted from the mine.

== Media ==
The Mill was used as a set during production of the television series Colditz. It has since been converted into apartments.

== See also ==
- Listed buildings in Calver
