= Hazlebadge =

Civil parish in Derbyshire, England

Coordinates: 53.316°N 1.742°W

- Civil parish
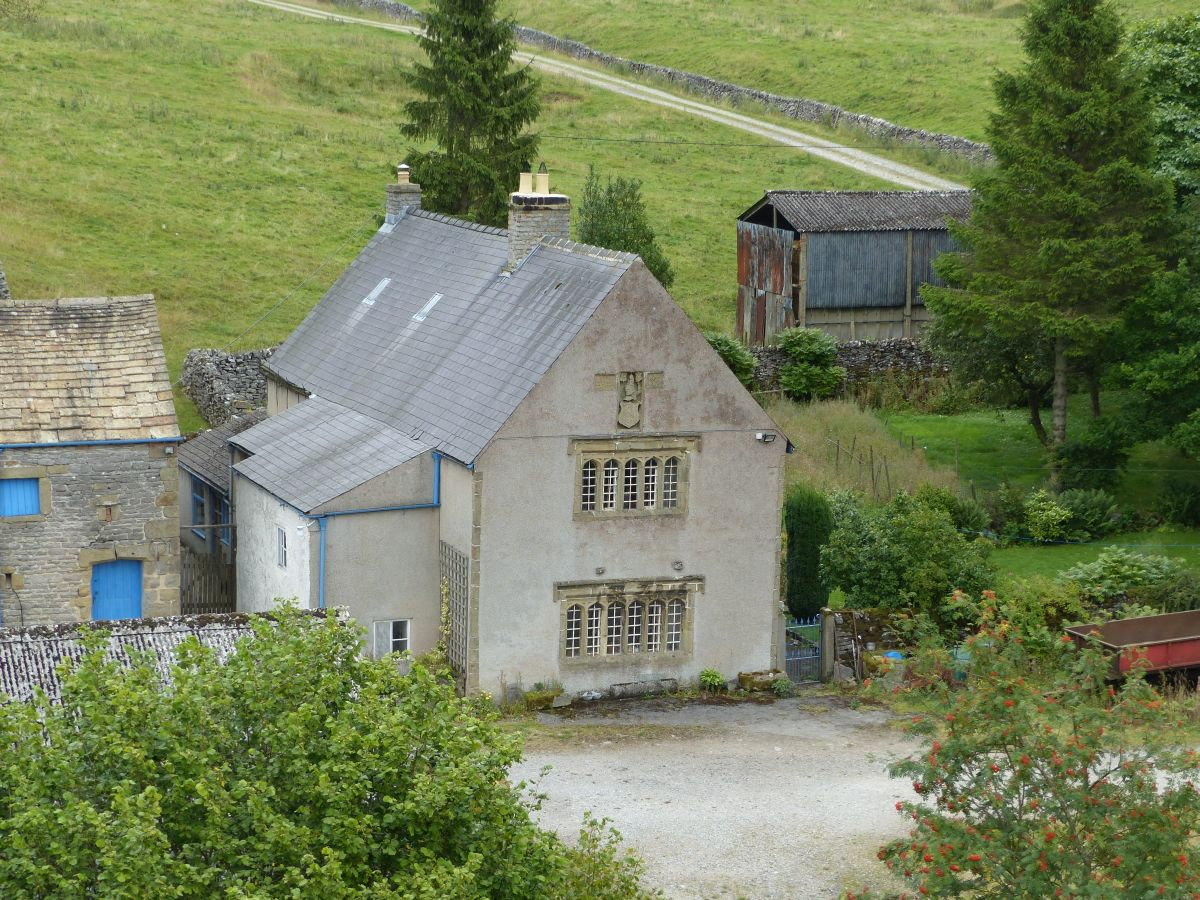
- Hazlebadge Hall

- Location within Derbyshire
- Interactive map of Hazlebadge
- Area: 1.28 sq mi (3.3 km^{2})
- Population: 25 (2021)
  - Density: 20/sq mi (7.7/km^{2})
- OS grid reference: SK 172799
  - London: 143 mi (230 km) SE
- District: Derbyshire Dales
- Shire county: Derbyshire
- Region: East Midlands
- Country: England
- Sovereign state: United Kingdom
- Settlements: Hazlebadge; Coplow Dale
- Post town: HOPE VALLEY
- Postcode district: S33
- Dialling code: 01433
- Police: Derbyshire
- Fire: Derbyshire
- Ambulance: East Midlands
- UK Parliament: Derbyshire Dales

Hazlebadge is a hamlet and civil parish within the Derbyshire Dales district, in the county of Derbyshire, England. Largely rural, Hazlebadge's population was reported as 25 residents in the 2021 census. It is 140 miles (230 km) north west of London, 30 miles (48 km) north west of the county city of Derby, and 7 miles (11 km) east of the nearest market town of Chapel-en-le-Frith. Hazlebadge is wholly within the Peak District national park, and shares a border with the parishes of Abney and Abney Grange, Bradwell, Brough and Shatton, Great Hucklow as well as Little Hucklow. There are four listed buildings in Hazlebadge.

== Geography ==
=== Location ===
Hazlebadge is surrounded by the following local areas:

- Bradwell to the north
- Little Hucklow, Great Hucklow and Coplow Dale to the south
- Abney to the east
- Peak Forest to the west.

The parish is roughly bounded by features such as Castleton Lane to the west, Bradwell Dale and Bradwell Edge to the north, Bleak Knoll to the east, and Stanlow Dale and Durham Edge to the south. This area lies in the far north of the Derbyshire Dales district, briefly overlying the boundary, and is within the northern region of Derbyshire county. Hazlebadge is predominantly an agricultural area, interspersed by few farms and occasional residential dwellings. It is recorded as being a deserted medieval village as it either contained more residences or was a nucleated village in medieval times. Hazlebadge is completely within the Peak District National Park.

==== Settlements ====
- The core of Hazlebadge hamlet is in the centre of the parish along New Road, numbered as the B6049.
- Coplow Dale is a small settlement along its south western edge which crosses from Little Hucklow into the parish.

=== Environment ===
==== Landscape and geology ====
Primarily farming and pasture land throughout the parish outside the sparsely populated areas, there are some small forestry plots throughout, mainly to the north by Bradwell Dale and Jennings Dale. Bradwell Dale and Bagshaw Cavern together is an SSSI noted for its over ground nature and cave system. Clay, limestone, gritstone and lead feature in the geology of the wider area.

==== Water features ====
The Deadman's Clough is a small self-contained stream to the east of the parish, along with a small number of reservoirs in the vicinity. There are some springs and wells found throughout the parish..

==== Land elevation ====
The parish can be hilly and undulating in places, the centre of the parish being within a valley with the land rising to the western and eastern edges. The lowest point is along the north boundary by Bradwell Hills at ~193 metres (633 ft), while the hamlet is 215 metres (705 ft), Coplow Dale at 285–290 metres (935–951 ft), with the parish peak along the south east boundary along Durham Edge at 416 metres (1,365 ft).

== History ==
=== Toponymy ===
Hazlebadge was recorded in the Domesday survey as Hegelebec, and means 'Hazel valley', or 'Hazel brook' (although there are few water features in the area), the place sometimes being alternatively referred to as Hazelbadge.

=== Parish ===
There is an oval barrow and platform cairn in the vicinity covering single or multiple burials and dating to the early to middle Neolithic periods and early Bronze Age (c.2000–1600BC), evidencing human occupation in the parish. There are possible signs of a Roman road through the south and east of the parish. Hazlebadge was recorded in 1086 at the time of the Domesday survey as owned by William Peverel, being held prior to the Norman Conquest in 1066 by Leofwin. By this time only three villagers were recorded. It formed part of the Honour of Peverel estate passed down to his successor William Peverel the Younger, but after he fell out of favour with Henry II these lands were forfeited to the state in 1153. It was then granted to Ranulph de Gernon, 2nd Earl of Chester who died before it could be accepted, and it reverted to King John ‘Count of Mortain’. The manor came into the possession of the Strelley family from the marriage of Sir Robert with Elizabeth Vavasour in the 13th century, and whose grandfather Robert Vavasour had held oversight of the Honour of Peverel. Besides their manor of Strelley, where their tombs can be seen in the Strelley church, they also had Shipley and part of Repton.

Philip de Strelley of the Nottinghamshire family held land in nearby Brough at the mill before the end of the 12th century, having been granted it by the then monarch. A later descendant, Hugo Strelley was recorded as holding the manor of Hazlebadge by 1250. A miller was recorded as residing in the area at this time, implying there was industry in the area, with later reports into the 15th century of a mill in use. Hazlebadge Hall existed from early medieval times, and was a home for the Strelley family. The Strelleys sold Hazlebadge manor to the Vernons of Haddon in 1421. Hazlebadge Hall was later demolished, the stone used for farm buildings, with the present house a creation of the Vernon family from 1549, dated from an onsite inscribed stone. It was used as a residence, a lodge during leisure days and as a local manor court. A later heiress, Dorothy, married into the Manners, whose later family became members of the Dukes of Rutland, these owning the manor until it was sold from their wider estates in 1920 due to them being heavily indebted with refurbishment costs of their seats, along with death duties.

=== Minerals ===
Mining throughout the wider region was an important occupation dating from Roman times, with limestone for building homes and walling uses, along with some zinc, but Hazlebadge was particularly notable for a number of lead pits, with several locations throughout the parish being worked. Liberties were administrative areas for lead mining, and usually followed parish boundaries. There were laws and customs of lead mining which began from the Anglo Saxon era.. The Crown owned the minerals beneath the ground and took royalties from the lead miners, and encouraged this activity as it was a good source of revenue. The Derbyshire lead field had two areas of oversight, the High and Low Peak, both were within the Kings field (or Queens field) which was an area administered for the Crown by the Duchy of Lancaster which was set up with a grant of land by Henry III for his son Edmund Crouchback in 1265. Outside of the Kings field there were areas of land where a noble had been granted the mineral rights as a favour by the King and royalties were instead payable to that noble.

The liberties of Hope, Castleton and Bradwell were mainly within the Kings field. There was, however, one private liberty, being Hazlebadge, owned after 1421 by the Vernons where the usual laws of the Kings field did not apply. It was lucrative; an estimation is that the mines of Castleton, Bradwell and Hucklow yielded 700–1000 loads (four loads = one ton approx.) each year between 1236 and 1249. The Vernon (later Manners) family acquired the Strelley estate in Castleton in 1421 and appear to have obtained the right to also ‘farm’ the lead, and was indicative of the family's determination to extend their grip on the lead miners, also obtaining land in Brough and the liberty of Hazlebadge over which they had full rights. They exerted heavy control on the local lead industry, which led to many legal battles and even riots. In 1630 John Manners from Haddon took all ore sales on his manor of Hazelbadge into his own hands and set the price at 9s per load instead of the market price of 22s leading to renewed conflict. Production continued into the late 20th century before it became uneconomic because of the mines becoming worked out, as well as cheaper imports.

=== Later history ===
Later resident tenants of Hazlebadge Hall included the Barnsley and Fox families during the 1800s, the latter with relations to Samuel Fox, the industrialist who was born in nearby Bradwell. By 1892, Hazelbadge Hall had been the residence of the Fox family for several generations, being first mentioned in the will of George Fox in 1763.

The parish of Bradwell was formed in 1875, of which Hazlebadge was a township. before which both were in the parish of Hope. Bradwell parish included Abney, Great and Little Hucklow, Grindlow, Wardlow and Hazlebadge, which was invariably described as a liberty, township and lordship because of its relative freedom. These later became separate civil parishes.

By the end of the 19th century, three reservoirs had been built amongst the eastern cliffs above the area. These were owned by Bakewell Rural District council and provided water primarily to Bradwell village. Also by this time, Hazlebadge was described as having 10 scattered residences, and very little domestic development has taken place since except for the expansion of agricultural buildings.

Quarters Farm was listed as one of the 10 most expensive properties sold in Derbyshire in 2020 (which includes a manufacturing business).

== Industry ==
As well as the regularised agricultural roles because of its rural location, primarily for pasture farming due to the rocky and hilly nature of the land, the area has also supported lead mining and limestone quarrying with several sites throughout the parish until the 20th century. Corn was ground at a millhouse for some centuries where Mill Meadow farm is presently located by Bradwell Hills. In more recent times, plastics manufacture is a medium-scale business activity locally. There are no amenities or public accessible facilities in the parish.

== Governance and demography ==
=== Population ===
There are 25 residents recorded within Hazlebadge for the 2021 census.

=== Local bodies ===
Because of its small population, Hazlebadge is managed at the first level of public administration via parish meetings, and there is no parish council.

At district level, the wider area is overseen by Derbyshire Dales district council, and because of its inclusion within a national park, the Peak District Park Authority. Derbyshire County Council provides the highest level strategic services locally.

== Landmarks ==
=== Listed buildings ===
There are four listed buildings within the parish, all at Grade II designation and agriculture-related, except for Hazlebadge Hall dating from 1549 which is at the higher designation of Grade II*.

=== Local monuments ===
The wider region is known for a range of historical artefacts, and Hazlebadge has a number of prehistoric and Roman locations spread throughout the parish.

There are two scheduled monuments recorded in Hazlebadge:

- Cop Low oval barrow – 150 metres (490 ft) to the east of the Cop Low settlement
- Funeral mound near Hill Rake, east of Bradwell Dale.

Stan Low is a round barrow 300 metres (980 ft) east of Cop Low and the B6049 road. Robin Hood's Cross along the north eastern border, is the remains of a cross, possibly having begun as a boundary marker near to Hazlebadge, Bradwell and Brough and Shatton parish tripoint. There are caverns to the north west area by Hartle Dale and elsewhere such as Quarters Farm Swallet.

=== Bradwell Dale and Bagshaw Cavern SSSI ===
Bradwell Dale and Bagshaw Cavern Site of Special Scientific Interest extends from Bradwell village in the north, bounded by Hartle Dale to the west, Hazlebadge Hall on the right and follows the B6049 road close to Nether Water Farm by the southern edge of the parish. Its two overlapping elements are Bradwell Dale, and below ground, the cave system of Bagshaw Cavern. The dale contains a well-incised limestone gorge, now completely dry, drained by means of the 3000 metres of cave passages within Bagshaw Cavern. The caves also feature occurrences of straw stalactites.
