= Highlow =

Coordinates: 53.311°N 1.671°W

- Civil parish
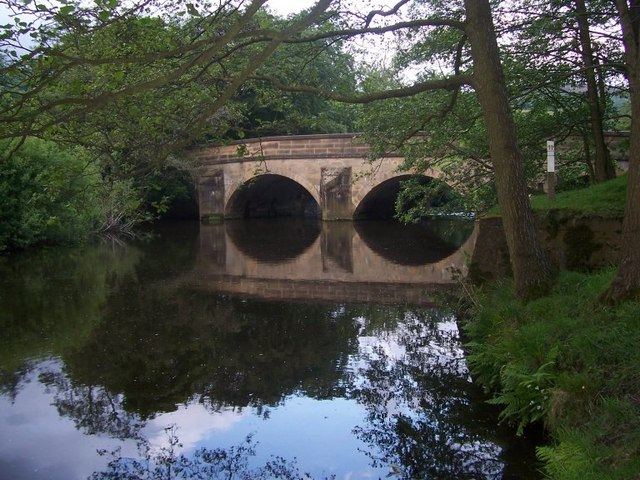
- The River Derwent at Leadmill Bridge

- Location within Derbyshire
- Interactive map of Highlow
- Area: 1.05 sq mi (2.7 km^{2})
- Population: 27 (2021)
  - Density: 26/sq mi (10/km^{2})
- OS grid reference: SK 224798
  - London: 140 mi (230 km) SE
- District: Derbyshire Dales
- Shire county: Derbyshire
- Region: East Midlands
- Country: England
- Sovereign state: United Kingdom
- Settlements: Highlow; Leadmill
- Post town: HOPE VALLEY
- Postcode district: S32
- Dialling code: 01433
- Police: Derbyshire
- Fire: Derbyshire
- Ambulance: East Midlands
- UK Parliament: Derbyshire Dales

Highlow is a civil parish within the Derbyshire Dales district, in the county of Derbyshire, England. Largely rural, Highlow's population is reported as 27 residents in 2021. It is 140 miles (230 km) north-west of London, 28 miles (45 km) north-west of the county city of Derby, and 7 1/2 miles (12.1 km) north of the nearest market town of Bakewell. Highlow is wholly within the Peak District national park, and shares a border with the parishes of Abney and Abney Grange, Eyam, Foolow, Grindleford, Hathersage as well as Offerton. There are nine listed buildings in Highlow.

== Geography ==
=== Location ===
Highlow is surrounded by the following local areas:

- Hathersage and Offerton to the north
- Bretton, Eyam and Grindleford to the south
- Leam and Upper Padley to the east
- Abney and Abney Grange villages to the west.

The parish is roughly bounded by land features such as Bretton Clough to the west, the Derwent and Dunge Brook to the north, Highlow Brook to the east, and Bole Hill to the south. This area lies in the far north of the Derbyshire Dales district and north region of Derbyshire county.

Highlow is completely within the Peak District National Park.

==== Settlements and routes ====
There are two hamlets within the parish:

- Leadmill is along the B6001 road in the far north east, and is the largest grouping of built environment
- A smaller cluster of residences and farms surrounding Highlow Hall in the central area along the Leadmill to Abney route.

Outside of these, Highlow is predominantly an agricultural and rural area, with very few scattered farms and occasional residential dwellings.

There are three roads throughout the parish:

- the B6001 road from Hathersage crosses the far east of the parish to Bakewell
- from that road at Leadmill, a single track lane runs to Abney
- from the lane, another route starting at Highlow Hall towards the north is the only way to Offerton.

=== Environment ===
==== Landscape and geology ====
Primarily farming and pasture land throughout the parish outside the sparsely populated areas, there are some small forestry plots throughout, mainly around the Highlow Brook valley. Abney and Bretton Clough is an SSSI which also covers this area. Limestone, gritstone and lead feature in the geology of the wider area, which lies on millstone grit from the carboniferous era, rising through mudstones, shales, sandstones and grits which have formed soils that are mainly coarse loams with peaty gleysols near springs on the sandstone/shale layers.

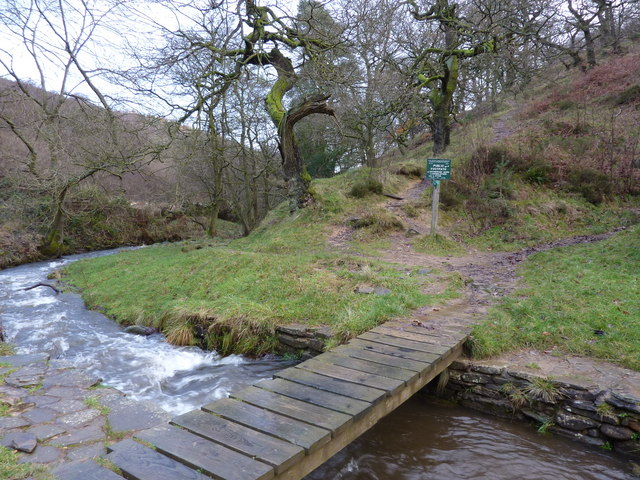
Footbridge at Stoke Ford

==== Water features ====
The parish is roughly bounded by the Bretton Brook to the west, the Derwent and Dunge Brook to the north, and Highlow Brook to the east and centre. Stoke Ford is where several paths meet by the convergence of the Bretton and Highlow streams. There are a number of springs found throughout the parish.

==== Land elevation ====
The parish can be hilly and undulating in places, the land generally rising from east to the west. The lowest point is in the north east area by Leadmill and the Derwent at ~142 metres (466 ft), while the central High Low hill near Highlow Hall is 281 metres (922 ft), The western area rises to 340–350 metres (1,120–1,150 ft), with the parish peak along the south west boundary by Bretton Clough at 370 metres (1,210 ft).

== History ==
=== Toponymy ===
Highlow was not recorded in the Domesday survey as a standalone settlement. It was first reported in public records from the 12th century as Heihlau, meaning high hill, presumably named after the notable land feature High Low hill in the centre of the parish.

=== Local area ===
There are tumuli and cairns in the north western area of the parish, which are ancient burial tombsites dating to the Bronze Age. Although not recorded during the time of the Domesday records in 1066, Highlow as a notable settlement was established enough to be on Christopher Saxton's 1579 Derbyshire map, approximately where Highlow Hall was located, although it appears to have become depopulated over time. An ancient route ran from Highlow known as the ‘corpse path’, possibly because of its use to transport coffins to the churchyard at Hathersage church. Halifax Gate was another old route which went over the Derwent, and southbound went onto the West Riding of Yorkshire.

Lead was mined in times past at locations throughout the parish and beyond. There is evidence that a lead mill by the locality of Leadmill at the start of the 17th century was earlier the site of a corn mill. The lead mill was subsequently in use up to the 18th century as a stonemason's mill before being converted to a private residence. A millpond located there has been latterly used as a fish farm. The only public house, The Plough Inn in Leadmill, was built in the 16th century. Leadmill Bridge over the River Derwent dates from the late 18th century where it replaced a ford, and was widened in 1928.

=== Highlow Hall ===
Highlow Hall comprised a small manor house and various auxiliary agricultural buildings dating to the late 16th century with middle 17th century alterations. By the time of Edward II the Highlow manor belonged to the Archer family, which later became extinct. Robert le Eyre was hereditary warden of the Royal Forest of the Peak administered from Peveril Castle in Castleton, during Edward III's reign, Robert's grandson, William le Eyre de Hope was forest warden. By the beginning of the 15th century Highlow Hall became the seat of a branch of the Eyre family, them having arrived in the country during the Norman Conquest, and by the time of Edward I had settled at the village of Hope.

Robert Eyre rebuilt the hall during the 17th century, and later became High Sheriff of Derbyshire. In the early part of the 18th century, John Eyre resurrected the ancient surname of Archer, but following his death in 1842 the hall and adjoining farm were sold to the Duke of Devonshire, owner of Chatsworth House, with tenant farmers taking up residence at the hall. Following the death of the 10th Duke of Devonshire the hall, as well as a number of other farms in the Chatsworth Estate were sold in order to satisfy death duties. The then resident tenants, the Wain family, bought Highlow Hall and remain present owners. The outbuildings and barns have been converted to cottages which are in separate ownership.

== Governance and demography ==
=== Population and local bodies ===
There are 27 residents recorded within Highlow parish for the 2021 census. Because of its small population, Highlow is managed at the first level of public administration via combined parish meetings with Abney and Abney Grange alongside Offerton, there is no parish council.

At district level, the wider area is overseen by Derbyshire Dales district council, and because of its inclusion within a national park, the Peak District Park Authority. Derbyshire County Council provides the highest level strategic services locally.

== Community and leisure ==
There is one public house at Leadmill, The Plough Inn which dates from the 16th century.

=== Tourism ===
There are sites offering overnight accommodation, catering particularly to Peak District visitors in Leadmill. Several landmarks and locations appealing to tourists are scattered throughout the wider area. The long distance Peak District walking route Derwent Valley Heritage Way follows the north east parish boundary.

== Landmarks ==
=== Listed buildings ===
There are nine listed structures within the parish, all at Grade II designation and mainly agricultural related, except for Highlow Hall and its archway entrance, both dating from the 16th century and at the higher designation of Grade II*.

=== Local monuments ===
The wider region is known for a wide range of prehistoric artefacts and Roman locations spread throughout.

The only scheduled monument recorded in Highlow is a cairnfield located around 600 metres (1/4 mi) west of Highlow Hall.

A tumulus is further to the west by the parish boundary.

=== Abney and Bretton Clough SSSI ===
This extends from Highlow Wood in the south of the parish, encircling north of Bole Hill, before encompassing the south western legs of the parish and the valley of the Bretton Brook, and continuing into the Abney Grange area. Bretton Clough is characterised by deep basin peats occurring within pockets of the landslip formations of its valley slopes.
