= Deadman's Clough =

Coordinates: 53°18′56″N 1°43′54″W

Location
- Country: England

Physical characteristics
- Source
  - location: Bradwell
- Mouth
  - location: Bretton Brook

Deadman's Clough is a stream in the civil parish of Hazlebadge in the Derbyshire Peak District. The stream rises to the south of Bradwell, where it meets the Bretton Brook to the west of Abney.

== Name ==
The name likely refers to Saxon conflicts in the area.

== See also ==
- List of rivers of England
