= Listed buildings in Highlow =

Highlow is a civil parish in the Derbyshire Dales district of Derbyshire, England. The parish contains nine listed buildings that are recorded in the National Heritage List for England. Of these, two are listed at Grade II*, the middle of the three grades, and the others are at Grade II, the lowest grade. The most important buildings in the parish are Highlow Hall and its gateway, which are listed at Grade II*. All the other listed buildings, apart from a bridge, are buildings or structures associated with the hall.

== Key ==
Grade	Criteria
II*	Particularly important buildings of more than special interest
II	Buildings of national importance and special interest

== Buildings ==
Name and location	Photograph	Date	Notes	Grade
Highlow Hall; 53.31734°N 1.67255°W		Late 16th century	A small manor house that has been altered and extended, it is in gritstone with roofs of Welsh slate and stone slate. There are two storeys and attics, and an irregular L-shaped plan. The southwest front has four bays, the left two bays are embattled, the right two bays are gabled, and there is a projecting two-storey embattled porch with moulded merlons. The doorway has a moulded surround, and above it is a mullioned window with a moulded surround. The left two bays have a string course, and the left bay contains a two-storey bay window. In the right two bays are sash and casement windows. On the northeast wall is a massive external chimney stack.	II*
Gateway to Highlow Hall; 53.31750°N 1.67286°W		Early 17th century	The gateway consists of a semicircular gritstone arch with a chamfered surround, rising from a wall with quoins. The arch is flanked by circular columns with moulded bases and capitals. Above the arch is a projecting moulded band, with ball finials at the ends, and the base for a further ornament in the centre.	II*
Outbuilding northwest of the barn, Highlow Hall; 53.31787°N 1.67283°W		Early 17th century	The outbuilding is in gritstone, with quoins, a stone slate roof, and two storeys. It contains six doorways that have lintels with cambered heads, four of which have been converted into windows, and two mullioned windows with the mullions removed. In the upper floor are two taking-in doors, and slit vents.	II
Barn northeast of Highlow Hall; 53.31772°N 1.67265°W		Mid-17th century	The barn is in gritstone, with quoins, and a tile roof with coped gables. There is a single storey with an overloft at the southeast end, and four bays. The barn contains a full height opening with a segmental head and a quoined surround, four doorways, most with chamfered and quoined surrounds, four levels of slit vents, and in the gable end, a dovecote with six tiers of perches, and pairs of round-headed entry holes.	II
Garden house west of Highlow Hall; 53.31733°N 1.67336°W		c. 1700	The garden house is in gritstone on a quoined base and a chamfered plinth, with an eaves band, and a pyramidal stone slate roof with an acorn finial. There are two storeys and a square plan. the openings have projecting flat-faced surrounds.	II
Gate piers and walls southeast of the Garden House, Highlow Hall; 53.31714°N 1.67327°W		Early 18th century	The gate piers are square and in gritstone, They rise from a shallow plinth, and each pier has a hood mould and a moulded cap. The flanking walls have half-round copings.	II
Gate piers and walls southwest of Highlow Hall; 53.31729°N 1.67277°W		Early 18th century	The gate piers are square and in gritstone, They rise from a shallow plinth, and each pier has a hood mould and a moulded cap. The flanking walls have chamfered coping, and the enclosure wall contains a doorway with a quoined surround.	II
Outbuilding northeast of Highlow Hall; 53.31756°N 1.67257°W		Mid-18th century	Originally a hen house and piggery, the building is in gritstone with quoins and a stone slate roof. There are two storeys and an external stairway. To the southwest is an enclosure containing two feeding troughs and a water trough, the enclosing wall with chamfered copings.	II
Leadmill Bridge; 53.32190°N 1.65103°W		Late 18th century	The bridge carries the B6001 road over the River Derwent. It is in gritstone, and consists of three depressed semicircular arches. The bridge has pointed cutwaters, voussoirs, a chamfered band, and a parapet with flattened saddleback copings.	II
