= Highlow Brook =

Coordinates: 53°18′51″N 1°40′00″W

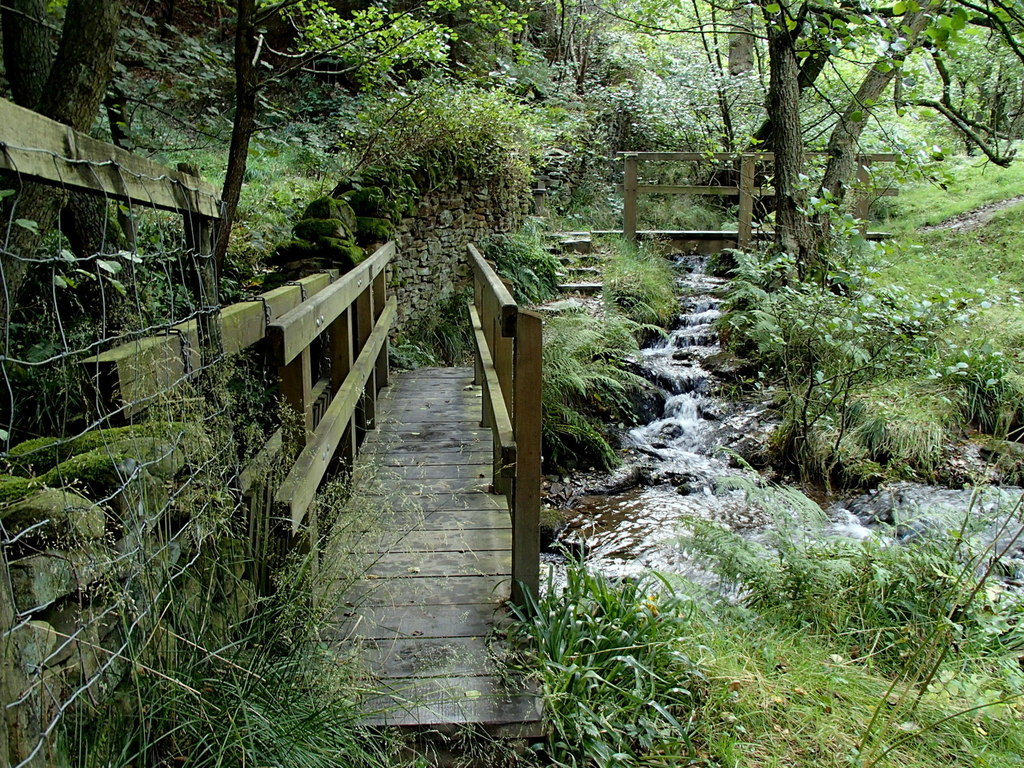
- Highlow Brook

Location
- Country: England

Physical characteristics
- Source
  - location: River Derwent
- Mouth
  - location: Bretton Brook

Highlow Brook is a stream in the civil parish of Highlow in the Derbyshire Peak District. The stream is a tributaries of the River Derwent, flowing southeast from the river, south of Hathersage, before meeting the Bretton Brook in Abney.

The brook is featured in popular walking routes within the Peak District National Park, including recreational trails that follow the watercourse through Highlow Wood to connect Hathersage and surrounding villages.

== See also ==
- List of rivers of England
