= Bretton Brook =

Coordinates: 53°18′51″N 1°40′00″W

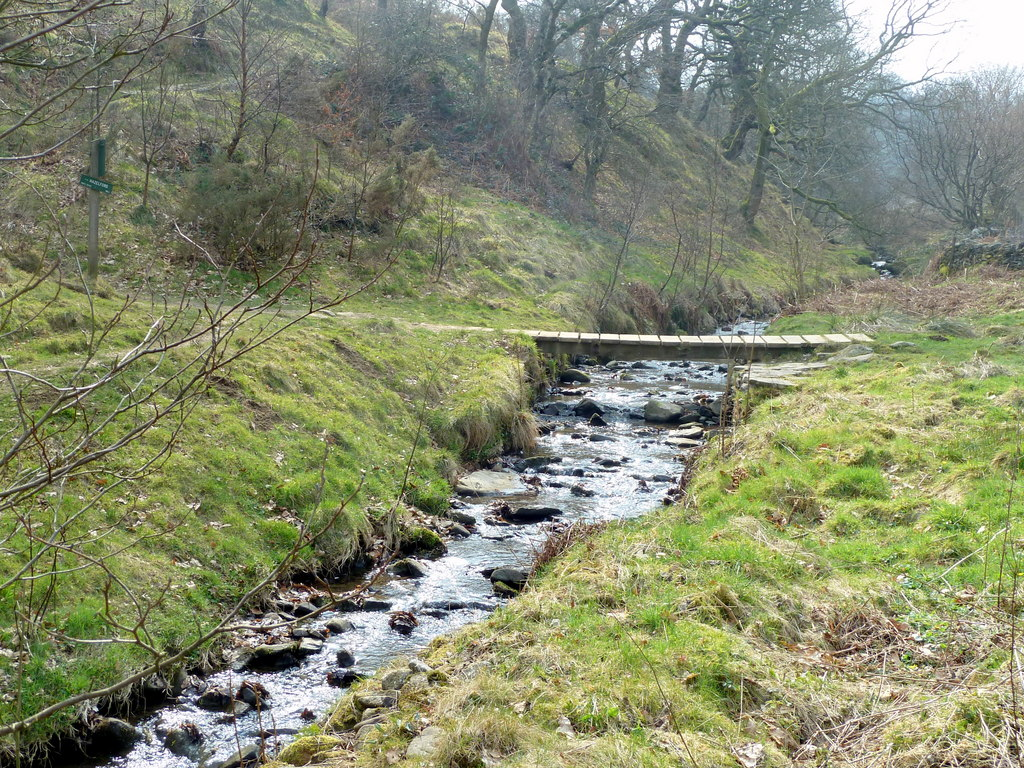
- Bretton Brook

Location
- Country: England

Physical characteristics
- Source
  - location: Highlow Brook
- Mouth
  - location: Deadman's Clough

Bretton Brook is a stream flowing through Bretton in the Derbyshire Peak District. The stream is a tributary of the Highlow Brook, which is a direct tributary the River Derwent south of Hathersage.

== See also ==
- List of rivers of England
