= Tideslow Rake =

Protected area in Derbyshire, England

Coordinates: 53°17′54″N 1°46′12″W

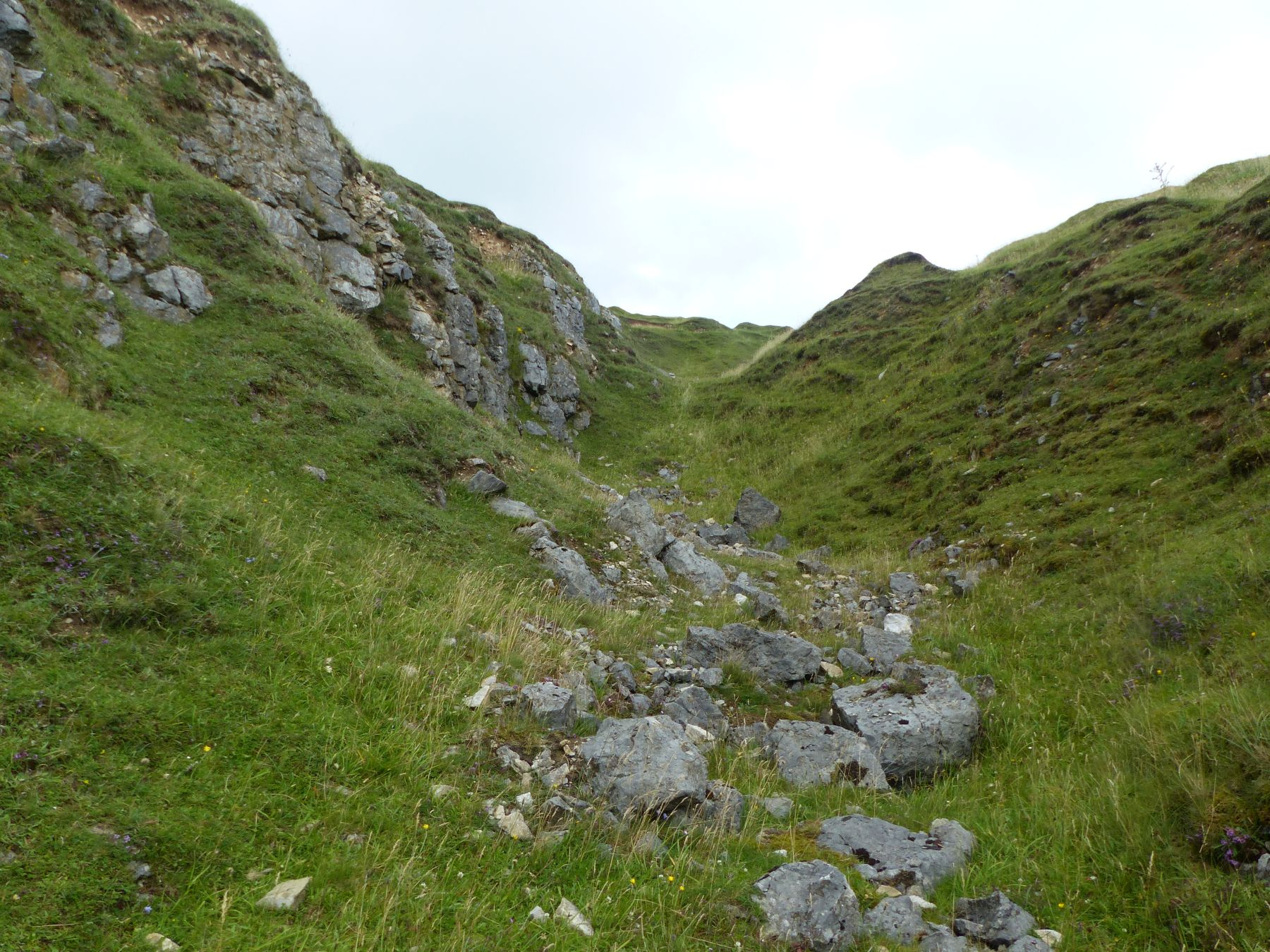
Tideslow Rake

Tideslow Rake is a Site of Special Scientific Interest within Peak District National Park in Derbyshire, England. It is located 2km north of the village of Tideswell and 900m south of the village of Little Hucklow. The soils at this site are rich in heavy metals because of a long history of lead mining there. The area is protected because of the plants and lichens that are adapted to the high levels of contaminants.

== Biology ==
Plant species at this site that are associated with heavy-metal deposits include spring sandwort, mountain pansy and moonwort.

In areas where the soil has lower levels of heavy metals, plant species include eyebright, lady’s bedstraw, rough hawkbit, salad burnet, limestone bedstraw, hairy rock cress, meadow saxifrage, woolly thistle and early-purple orchid.

Lichen species at this site tend to be adapted to acidic heathlands, reflecting the vegetation that used to be present here. These lichen species include Cetraria islandica, Cladonia bacillaris (considered part of Cladonia macilenta), Cladonia scabriuscula, Verrucaria xyloxena (genus Verrucaria), Vezdaea rheocarpa (genus Vezdaea) and Bacidina indigens (genus Bacidina).

Ecological studies at this site have considered the different strategies used by plants to survive on metal contaminated soils.

== Scheduled monument ==
This site shows a range of features associated with mining and also a limekiln whose quicklime production was used for blasting. A gin-circle marking the historic position of horse-powered winding gear is also present.
