= Highlow Hall =

House in Highlow, Derbyshire Dales, England

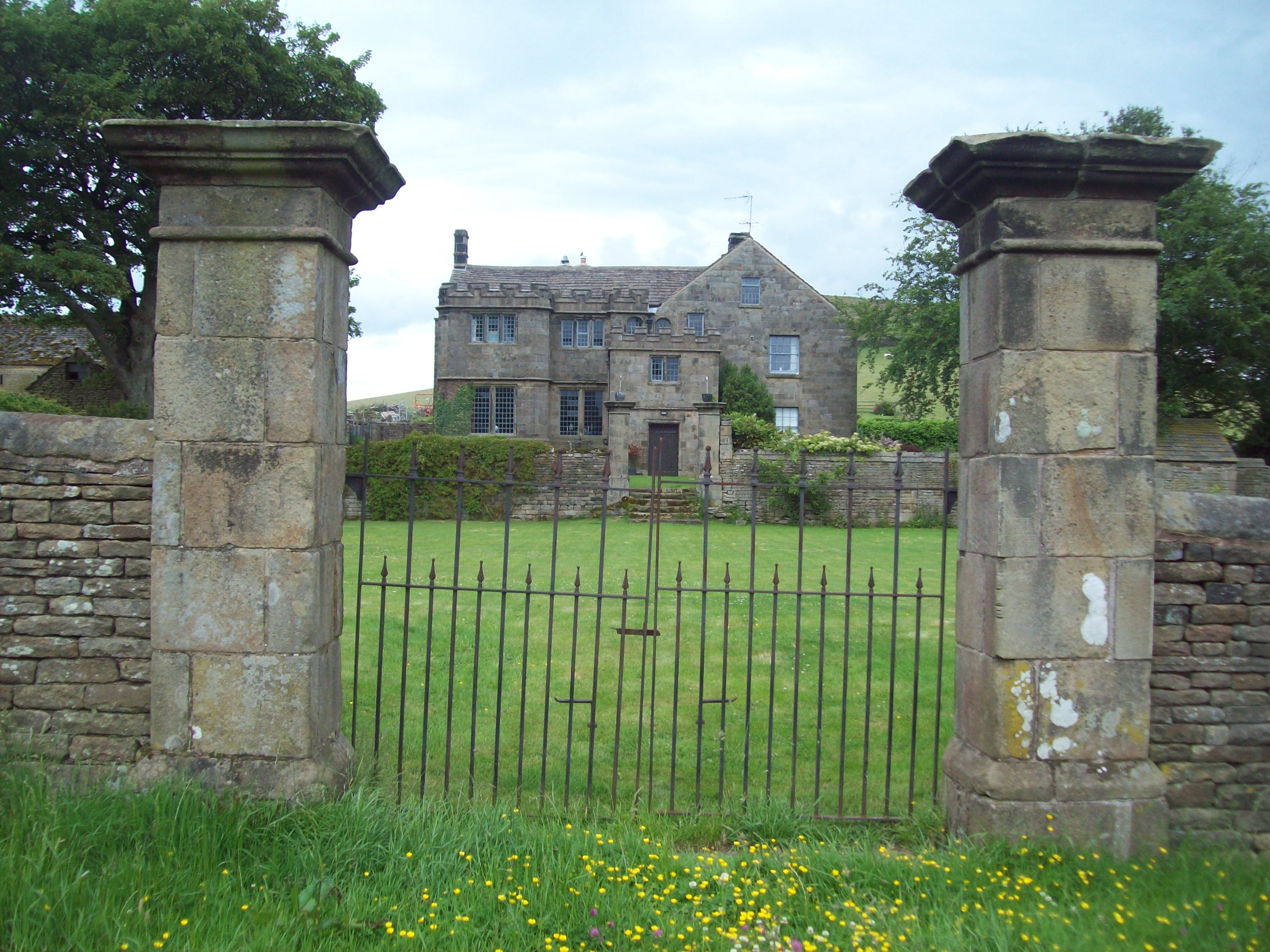
- Highlow Hall

- Location within Derbyshire
- 53.3173°N 1.6725°W
- Location: Highlow, Derbyshire

History
- Built: Late 16th century

Listed Building – Grade II*
- Official name: Highlow Hall
- Designated: 29 September 1951
- Reference no.: 1311217

Highlow Hall is a historic Elizabethan manor house in Highlow civil parish, near Hathersage, Derbyshire, England. It was owned by the Eyre family from approximately 1340 to 1842, at which point one branch of the family had already emigrated to the United States. It is a Grade II*-listed building and dates to the late 16th century.

The gateway to the hall is also Grade II* listed and a number of other buildings are listed at Grade II:

- Gate piers, flanking walls and wall linking the Hall and the flanking walls
- Gate piers and flanking walls south east of garden house
- Garden house to the west
- Farm outbuilding to the north east
- Barn to the north east
- Farm outbuilding attached to the north east end of the barn to the north east
Listed buildings at Highlow Hall
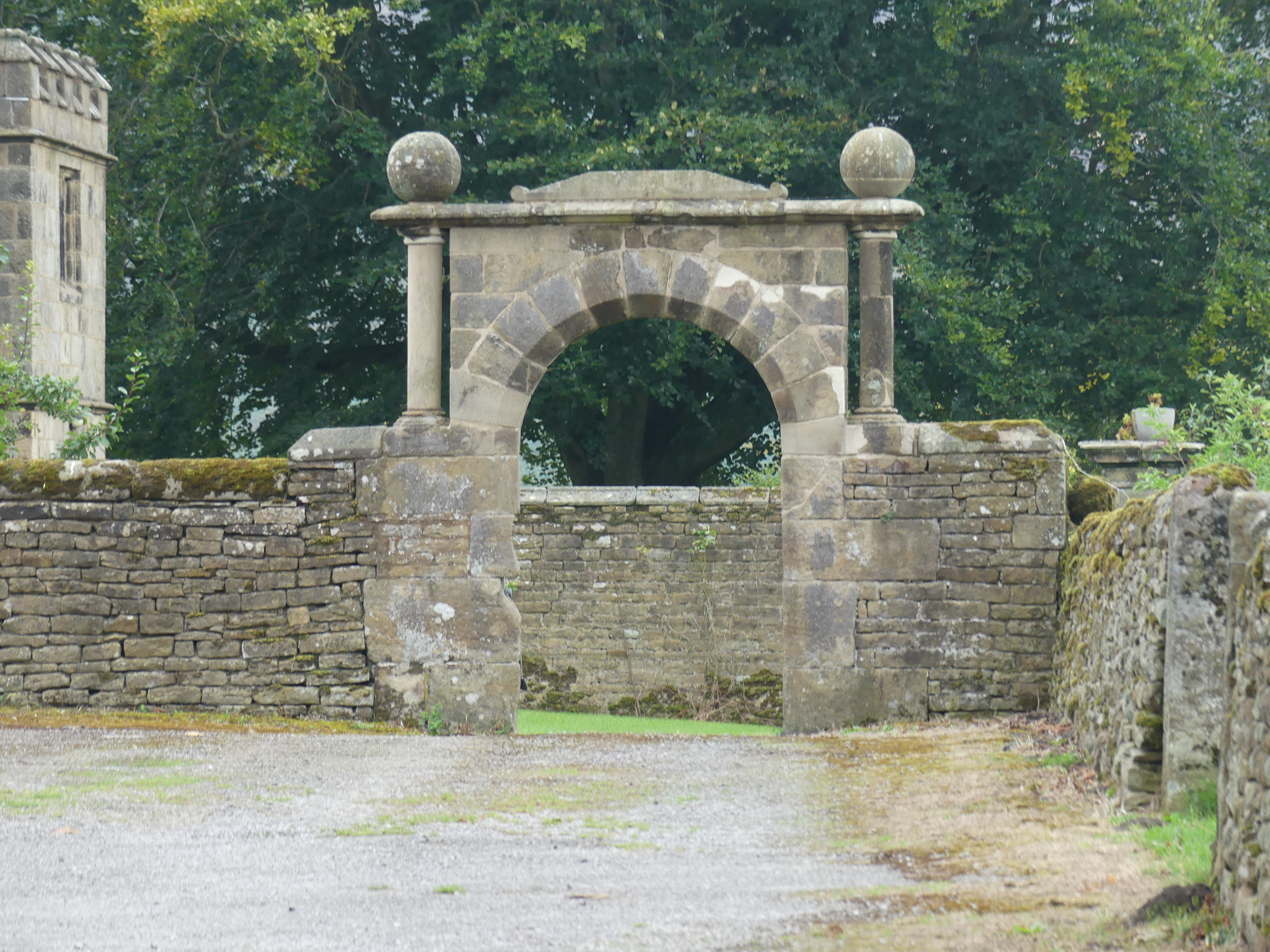
Main gateway

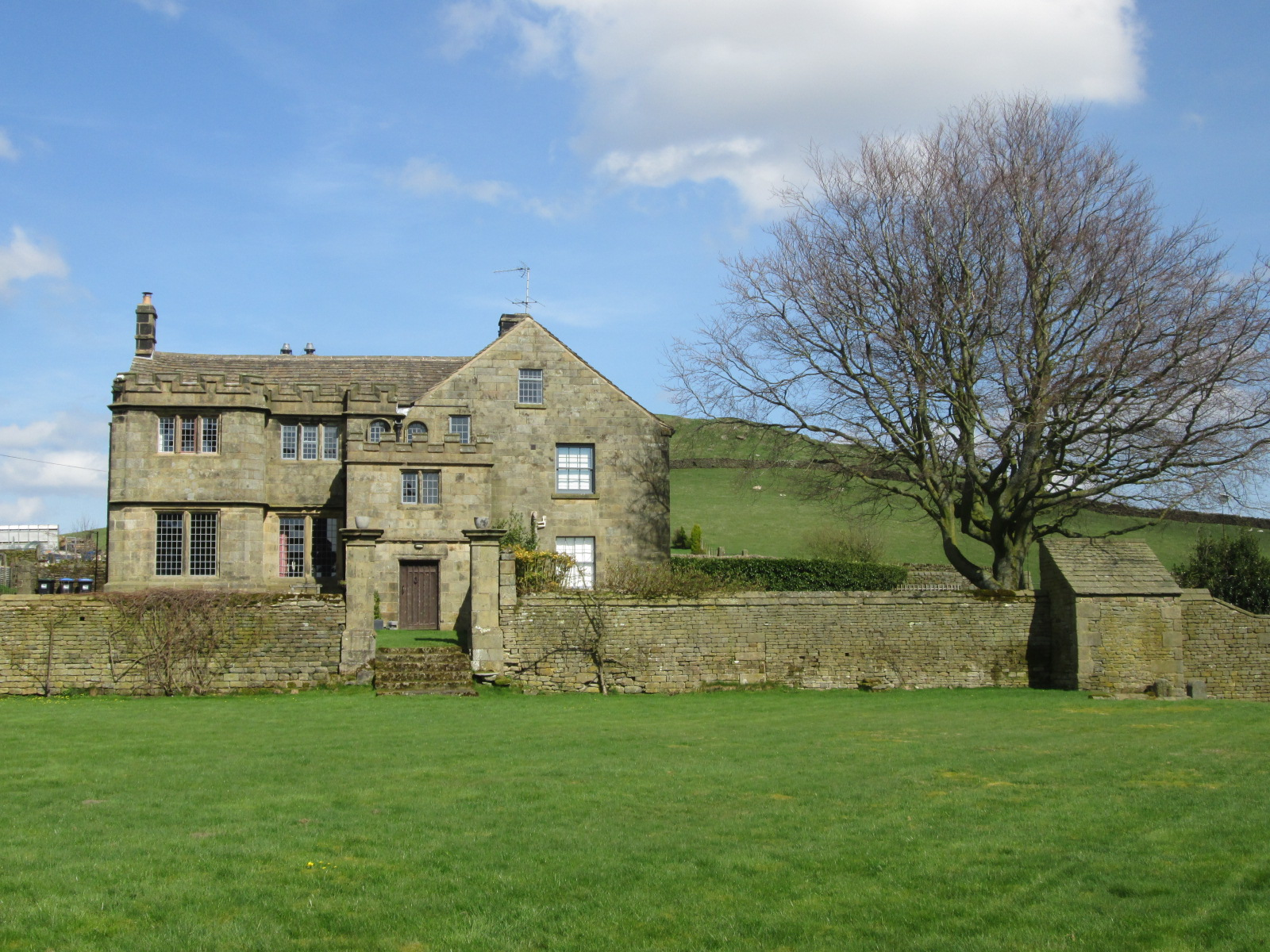
Flanking wall and gateway

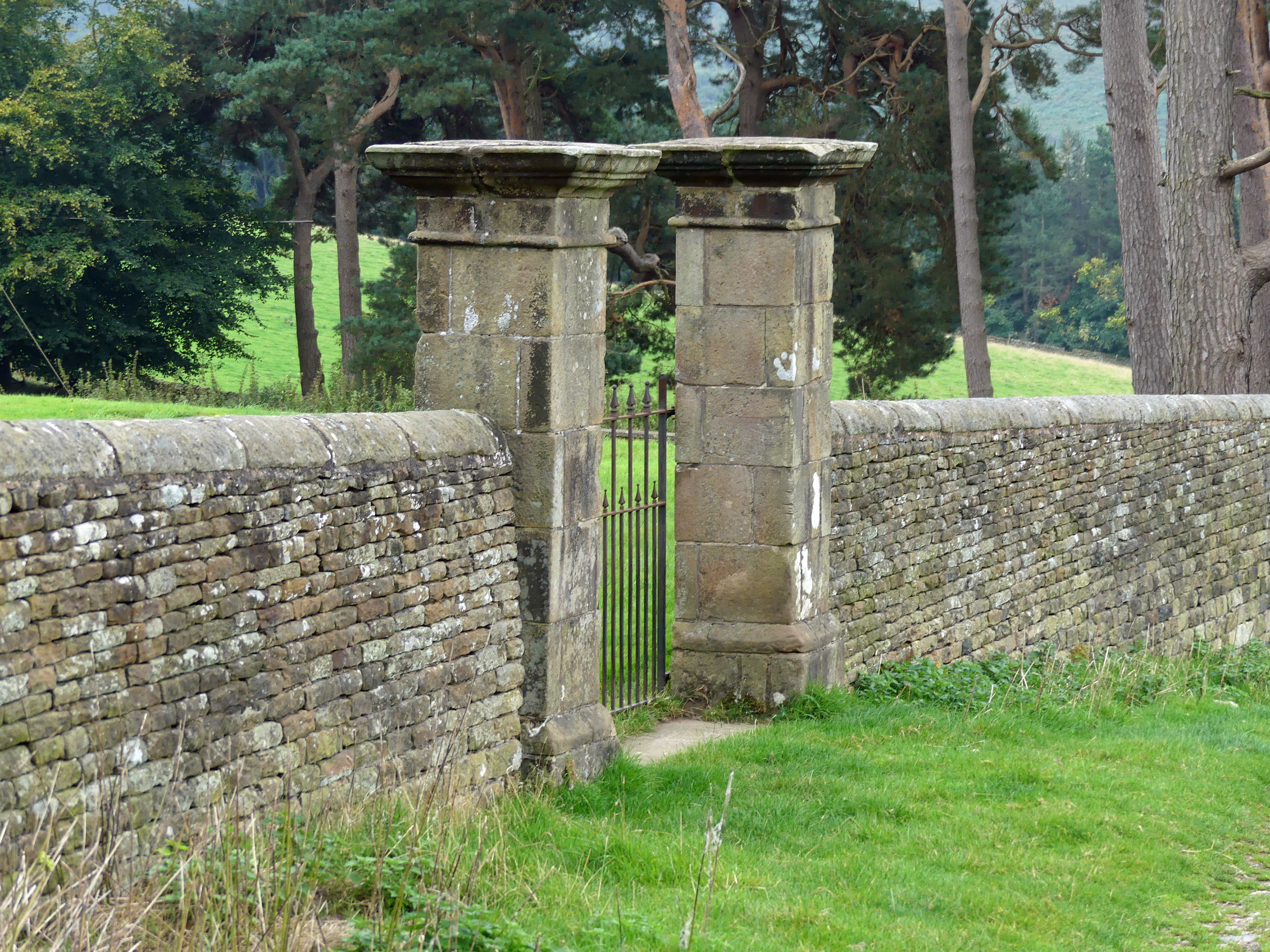
Outer gates and wall

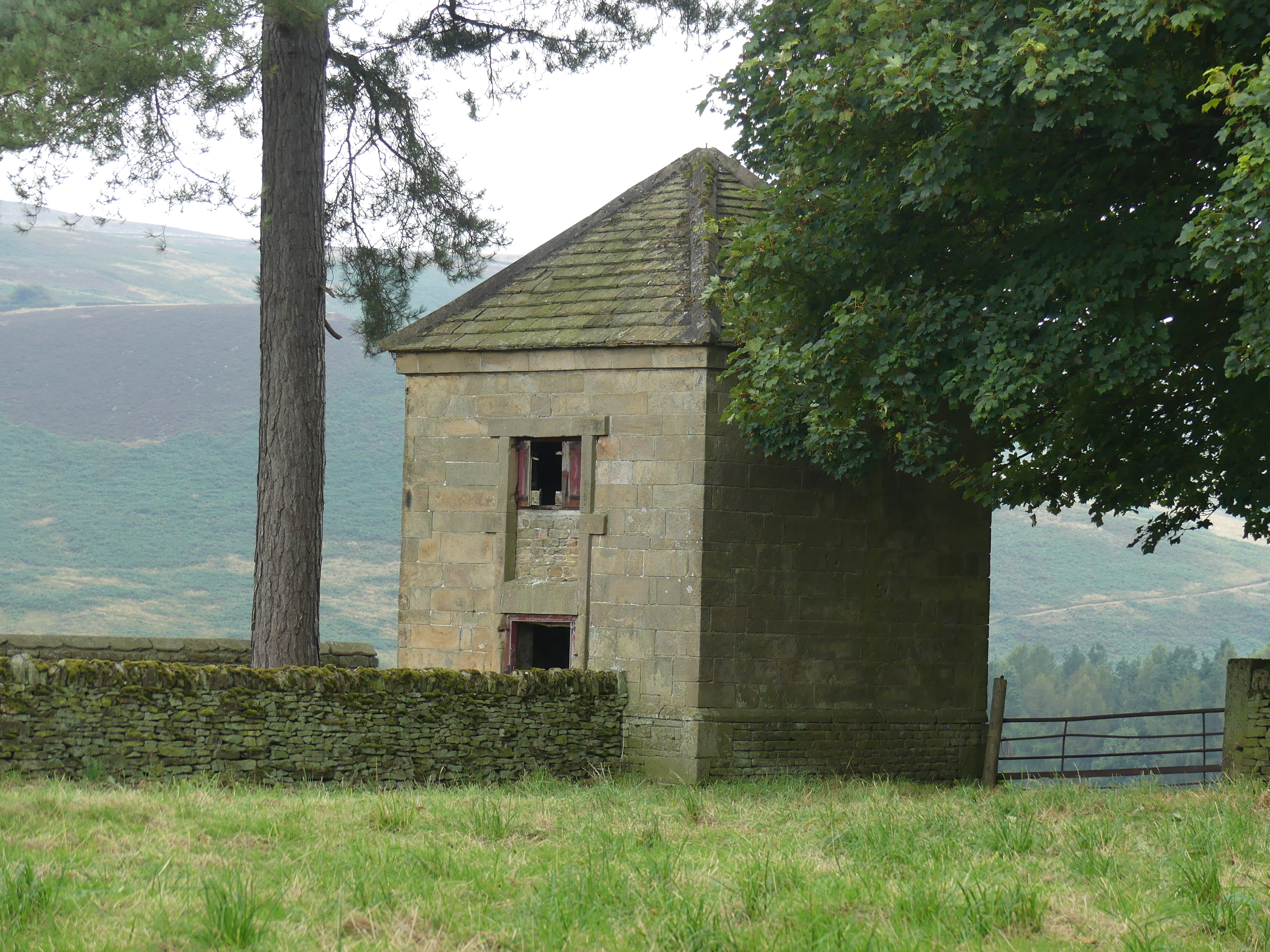
Garden house

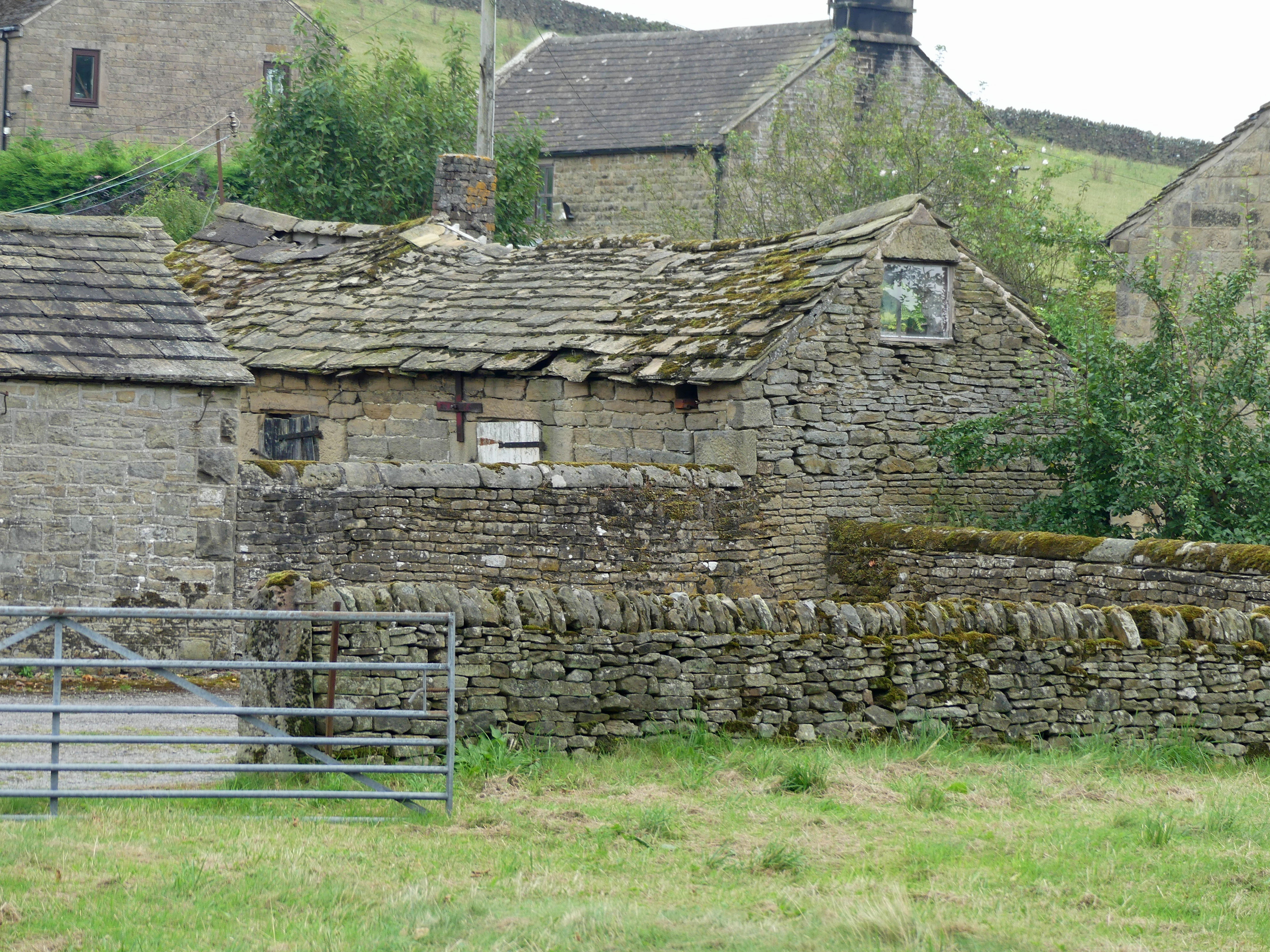
Outbuilding to north-east

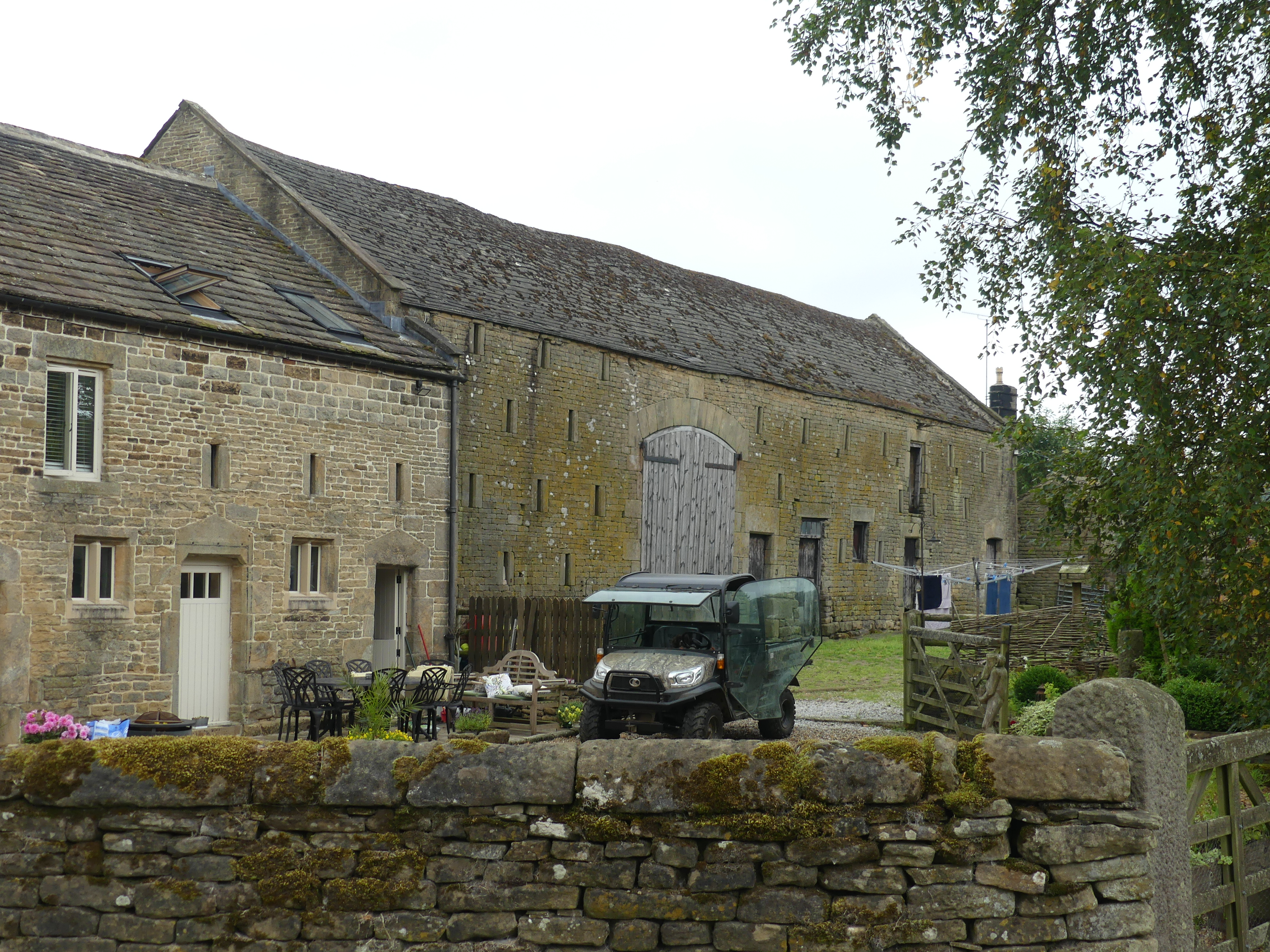
Barn to north-east

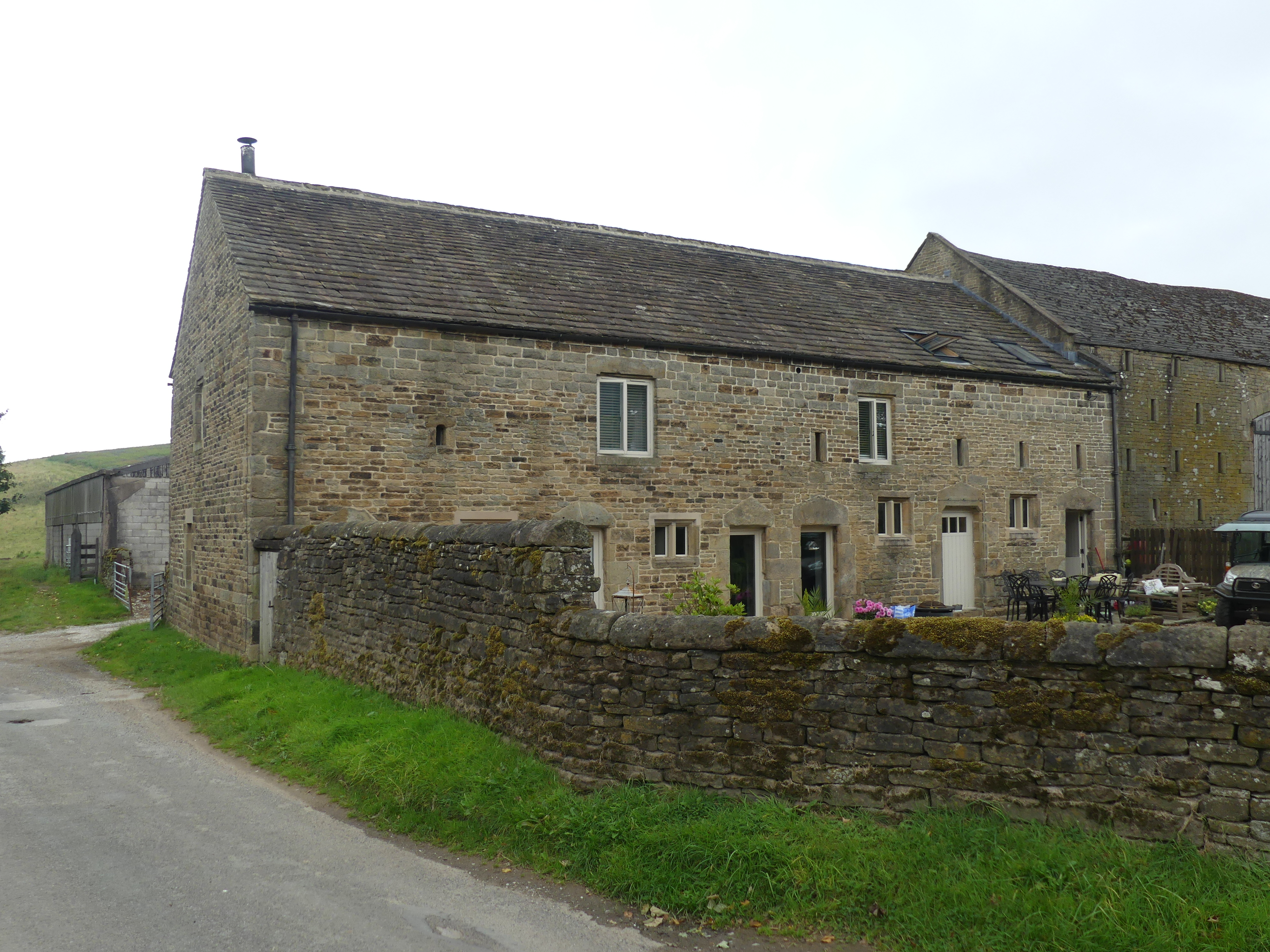
Outbuilding adjoining barn

Highlow Hall is associated with the White Lady, a local ghost of a woman named Elizabeth Archer, said to haunt the estate.

== See also ==
- Grade II* listed buildings in Derbyshire Dales
- Listed buildings in Highlow
