= Listed buildings in Great Hucklow =

Great Hucklow is a civil parish in the Derbyshire Dales district of Derbyshire, England. The parish contains eight listed buildings that are recorded in the National Heritage List for England. All the listed buildings are designated at Grade II, the lowest of the three grades, which is applied to "buildings of national importance and special interest". The parish contains the village of Great Hucklow and the surrounding countryside, and the listed buildings consist of houses, farmhouses and two chapels, and structures associated with them.

== Buildings ==
Name and location	Photograph	Date	Notes
Hucklow Hall; 53.29766°N 1.73306°W		Mid 17th century	The house is in gritstone, with massive quoins, and a stone slate roof with moulded gable copings and plain kneelers. There are two storeys and attics, a two-bay hall range and a gabled cross wing. The doorway has a chamfered quoined surround, most of the windows are mullioned with hood moulds, and on the west front is a transomed stair window.
Artis Farmhouse and barn 53.29731°N 1.73771°W	—	Mid 18th century	The farmhouse and barn are under a continuous roof, and are in gritstone with quoins, and a tile roof with moulded gables and kneelers. There are two storeys, the house has three bays, and the barn has two. On the front of the house are two doorways, one with a bracketed hood, and the other with a porch, and the windows are mullioned. In the barn are doorways, windows, and a small hayloft door.
The Old Manse and walls 53.29710°N 1.73452°W		Mid 18th century	A limestone house with gritstone dressings on a plinth, with rusticated quoins, sill bands, a moulded eaves cornice, and a tile roof with coped gables and moulded kneelers. There are three storeys and a symmetrical front of three bays. The central doorway has Doric pilasters and a pediment, and the windows are mullioned with three lights. At the rear is a mullioned and transomed stair window. Enclosing the garden are walls with flat coping and iron railings at the front, containing square gate piers with pyramidal copings.
Camphill Farmhouse; 53.30354°N 1.72820°W	—	Late 18th century	The farmhouse is in rendered stone with gritstone dressings and a tile roof. There are two storeys and four bays. On the front are two doorways with flush surround and a single-light window, and the other windows are mullioned and contain two casements.
Stanley House and stable block 53.28199°N 1.73251°W		1781	The house and stable block, now incorporated into the house, are in limestone with gritstone dressings, quoins, and a tile roof on the house and stone slate on the stable block. The house has two storeys, a double-depth plan, and three bays, and the stable block is attached to the rear range. Steps lead up to the central doorway that has a moulded bracketed hood and a plain fanlight. The windows are sashes, and in the stable range is a segmental-headed arch with a quoined surround and an initialled and dated keystone.
Unitarian Chapel; 53.29614°N 1.73370°W		1796	The chapel, which was extended in 1901, is in gritstone with quoins, a sill band, an eaves band, and a roof of tile and blue slate, with coped gables and plain kneelers. There are four bays, three with a single storey, and the south bay with two. The doorway and most of the windows have semicircular heads. The south gable end has a mullioned window, a window with a semicircular head, and an inscribed plaque, and on the apex is a corbelled-out bellcote.
Methodist Chapel; 53.29716°N 1.73389°W		1806	The chapel is in rendered stone with gritstone dressings, on a plinth, with bracketed eaves, stone slate on the main roof, and slate on the lean-to. There is a single storey, the entrance front has three bays, and a pedimented gable containing an inscribed and dated plaque. In the centre is a semicircular-arched doorway with a traceried fanlight, flanked by sash windows with semicircular heads.
Walls and gate, Methodist Chapel; 53.29706°N 1.73377°W	—	Early 19th century	The walls enclosing the churchyard on the east and north sides are in limestone and gritstone with chamfered copings. On the east side are iron gates, and square gate piers with pedimented copings, between which is an iron lantern arch with decorative scroll work.
