= Bretton, Derbyshire =

Coordinates: 53.28°N 01.70°W

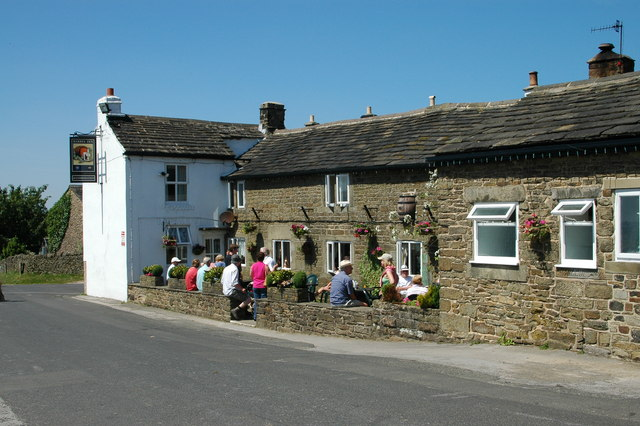
- The Barrel Inn, Bretton.

- Location within Derbyshire
- OS grid reference: SK2077
- District: Derbyshire Dales
- Shire county: Derbyshire
- Region: East Midlands
- Country: England
- Sovereign state: United Kingdom
- Post town: HOPE VALLEY
- Postcode district: S32
- Dialling code: 01433
- Police: Derbyshire
- Fire: Derbyshire
- Ambulance: East Midlands
- UK Parliament: Derbyshire Dales

Bretton, Derbyshire is a hamlet in Derbyshire, England. Set on a ridge with a panoramic view, it has few inhabitants but boasts a pub called the Barrel Inn, and the Bretton youth hostel.

The hamlet lies above Bretton Clough, a narrow, steep-sided valley which Bretton Brook runs through. The clough also contains the remnants of five deserted homesteads which once formed part of a small community in the area.

== See also ==
- Bretton Brook
