= Little Hucklow =

Village in Derbyshire, England

Coordinates: 53.304°N 1.756°W

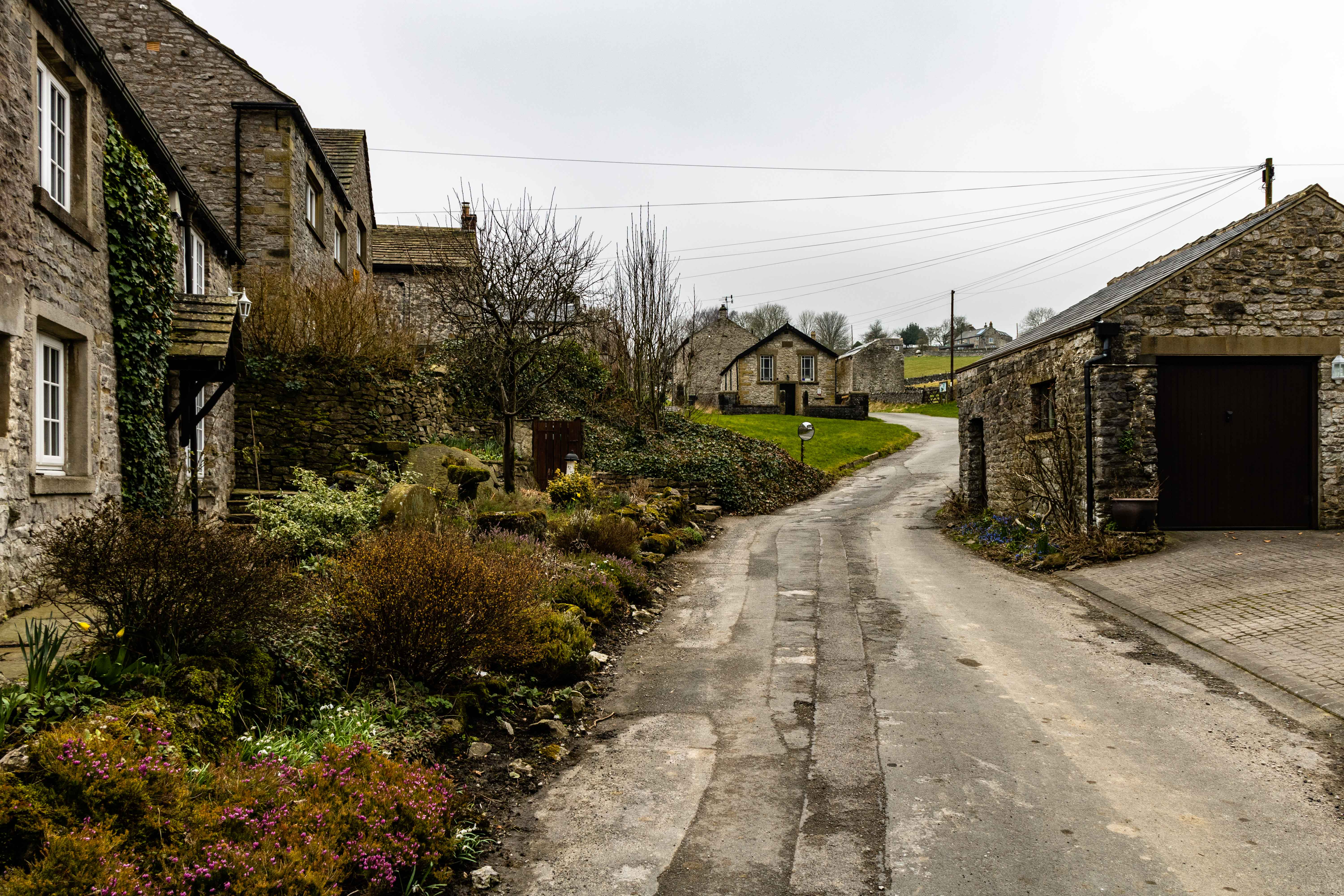
- Houses in Little Hucklow

- Location within Derbyshire
- OS grid reference: SK163785
- District: Derbyshire Dales
- Shire county: Derbyshire
- Region: East Midlands
- Country: England
- Sovereign state: United Kingdom
- Post town: BUXTON
- Postcode district: SK17
- Dialling code: 01298
- Police: Derbyshire
- Fire: Derbyshire
- Ambulance: East Midlands
- UK Parliament: Derbyshire Dales

Little Hucklow is a village and civil parish in Derbyshire. Whilst it is a separate civil parish in the Derbyshire Dales District, the Parish Council is joint with Great Hucklow, and Grindlow. The parish consists of the village of Little Hucklow and the hamlets of Coplow Dale and Windmill.

The population of the parish is about 120 reducing to less than 100 at the 2011 Census. The population is now included in the civil parish of Great Hucklow. It lies within the Peak District National Park, under Hucklow Edge. The neighbouring villages are Bradwell, Derbyshire to the north, Great Hucklow to the east and Tideswell to the south. The village lies just west of the B6049 about a mile and a half north of where it crosses the A623 at the Anchor Inn. The village is linear and is aligned east–west.

The sole public house in Little Hucklow village, the Old Bulls Head, closed in the 2000s but reopened as the Blind Bull in 2020. Adjoining the pub is the Manor House, a Grade II* listed building dating from 1661.

The parish is highly rural with current farming activity being mainly livestock rearing. There was formerly considerable lead mining activity in the parish, including a 600-foot-deep (180 m) shaft at High Rake mine. The mine is situated on a large vein about a quarter of a mile west of the hamlet of Windmill in the Liberty of Little Hucklow. This vein is known under different titles as it ranges from the Sir William Hill to the east to beyond Tideslow Top to the west. At High Rake shaft it is called the High Rake, but immediately west of the old Tideswell to Castleton road it is known as Tideslow Rake and beyond Tideslow Top as White Rake. Eastward beyond Windmill it is known as the Hucklow Edge Vein. The foundations of the mine buildings at High Rake have been excavated by the Peak District Historical Mines Society. High Rake Mine is a Scheduled Monument as is Tideslow Rake to the west; the latter is also a designated Site of Special Scientific Interest.

Windmill is a small hamlet in the parish of Little Hucklow, consisting of fifteen houses, and several farms. It is on the lane that runs west from Windmill Triangle to the Old Castleton Road. There are a number of old houses, one a former public house and the other the village shop and café.
