= Great Hucklow =

Village in Derbyshire, England

Coordinates: 53.297°N 1.734°W

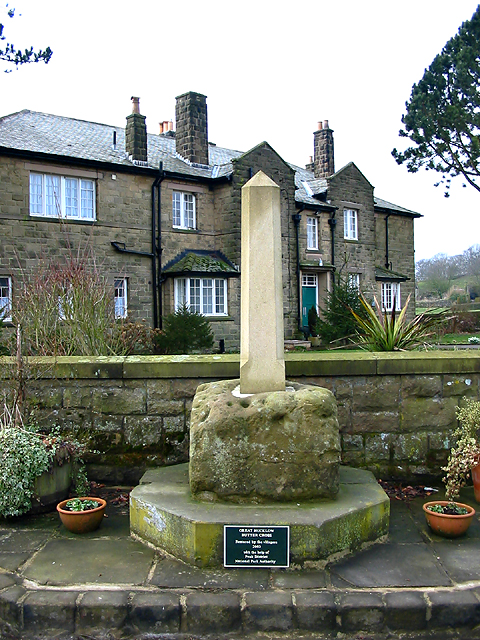
- Great Hucklow Butter Cross

- Location within Derbyshire
- Population: 427 (2011)
- OS grid reference: SK177777
- District: Derbyshire Dales
- Shire county: Derbyshire
- Region: East Midlands
- Country: England
- Sovereign state: United Kingdom
- Post town: BUXTON
- Postcode district: SK17
- Dialling code: 01298
- Police: Derbyshire
- Fire: Derbyshire
- Ambulance: East Midlands
- UK Parliament: Derbyshire Dales

Great Hucklow (Old English Hucca's burial mound) is a village and civil parish in the Derbyshire Peak District which is under Hucklow Edge between the villages of Tideswell and Bradwell. It has a population of about 100, including Foolow, Grindlow and Little Hucklow and was measured at 427 in the 2011 Census.

The village is twinned with Parisot, Tarn-et-Garonne, a rural village of similar size in the south-west of France.

== Geography ==
The land rises steeply to the north of the village to Hucklow Edge and at Camphill on the plateau above it there is a gliding field, operated by the Derbyshire and Lancashire Gliding Club, which in July 1954 hosted the World Gliding Championships. On 9 August 2011 a paraglider flight began in the village, ending over 250 km away in Suffolk.

The village is accessed from the B6049 about a mile north of where it crosses the A623 at the Anchor Inn. The road to the village goes off to the east at the Windmill triangle.

A lead vein or rake outcrops to the surface to the west of the village and dives under the rocks of Hucklow Edge on the western side of the village.

== History ==
The Unitarian Old Chapel was founded in 1696 and is still in use; it also has a small meeting room which is used by the community. The Methodist Chapel, built in the early part of the 19th century, was converted to offices in 1999.

The area is mainly agricultural, but the village was formerly a centre of the Derbyshire lead mining industry. An adit, known as Milldam Mine, has recently been reopened by Glebe Mines Ltd that connects the various deep mines that had formerly been dug along Hucklow Edge. This mine is being worked for fluorspar, which is frequently found associated with lead in the vein.

== Culture and community ==
It had a theatre for 40 years, which was run by L. du Garde Peach with actors and staff from the local area. The first production (The Merchant of Venice, Shakespeare) was in 1927 staged in the Hucklow Holiday Homes. The first set of plays in the New Play House was in 1938, with four one act plays written by Peach. The New Play House was in a converted lead mining building (known locally as cupolas from the lead smelting furnace). The first 200-second hand seats cost 1 shilling and 9 pence each. The stage was 28 feet (8.5 m) wide by 30 feet (9.1 m) deep. The theatre brought visitors to Great Hucklow from all parts of the north of England. The theatre building is still used as an activity centre.

The Nightingale Centre, which belongs to the Unitarians, is in the middle of the village and accommodates groups for school and community visits to the area, conferences and provides country holidays for children from inner cities. The Centre brings many visitors to the village from all over the world.

Recently, Great Hucklow has taken control of the Silance Mine Heritage Site, jointly with the village of Foolow. This is a four hectare area of scrub, woodland and grassland on a south facing slope on Hucklow Edge which was the previous location for lead working at both Silence and Old Grove Mine and more recent re-working of the surface mineral heaps for fluorspar. The site straddles the parish boundary between Grindlow to the west and Foolow to the east. It is positioned on the boundary between the White and Dark Peak character areas. The history of mining has resulted in the development of complex surface soils with those derived from the shales lying in intimate association with soils developing from limestone and mineral material brought to the surface during the mining operations. Both Silence and Old Grove Mines have been extensively reworked for fluorspar at surface, but at the top end of Silence Mine there are the previously unrecognised remains of steam engine buildings and associated structures. These include the back walls of a horizontal engine house and boiler house, the possible base of a chimney and a small sunken ‘chamber’ that originally was one half of a wheel pit which contained a large flywheel and/or winding drum associated with the engine house. Hillocks remain in the northern part of Old Grove Mine. The Peak District Mines Historical Society are currently excavating the remains of Silance Mine.

The village is host to an annual martial arts residency, a tradition that dates back almost 30 years.

== Education ==
In the village is a primary school, which is located up School Lane, under the edge, and a pub, the Queen Anne.

== See also ==
- Listed buildings in Great Hucklow
