= Coplow Dale =

Settlement in Derbyshire, England

Coordinates: 53.30°N 01.76°W

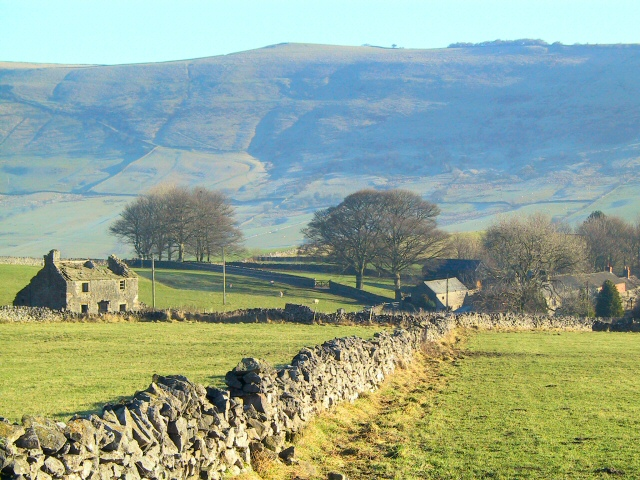
- Coplow Dale.

- Location within Derbyshire
- OS grid reference: SK1679
- Shire county: Derbyshire
- Region: East Midlands
- Country: England
- Sovereign state: United Kingdom
- Police: Derbyshire
- Fire: Derbyshire
- Ambulance: East Midlands

Coplow Dale (or Coplowdale) is a small settlement in the civil parish of Little Hucklow, Derbyshire, England.
