= Abney, Derbyshire =

Village in Derbyshire, England

Coordinates: 53.31°N 1.71°W

Abney
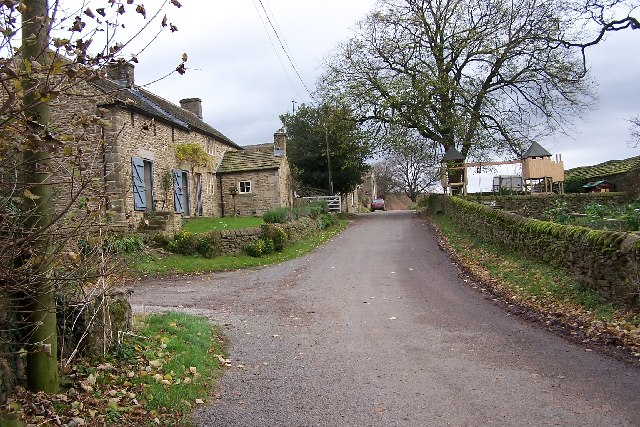
- Abney village

- Location within Derbyshire
- OS grid reference: SK194792
- District: Derbyshire Dales
- Shire county: Derbyshire
- Region: East Midlands
- Country: England
- Sovereign state: United Kingdom
- Post town: HOPE VALLEY
- Postcode district: S32
- Dialling code: 01433
- Police: Derbyshire
- Fire: Derbyshire
- Ambulance: East Midlands

Abney (Old English Abba's Island) is a village in the parish of Abney and Abney Grange in the English county of Derbyshire. The settlement was mentioned as Habenai in the Domesday book of 1086. It was recorded as Abbeneia, Abbeney(a) and Abbeneye between 1200 and 1431, and as Abney from 1416.

Abney was in the civil parish of Outseats, but in April 2015 the Outseats parish was merged with Hathersage parish, the latter name being used for the two combined parishes. The village is too small to have its own amenities other than a village hall, which contains a war memorial commemorating two parishioners, Wilfred Eyre and Reginald Eydes, who died in the First World War. The closest church, pub and shops are in Eyam.

== Listed building ==
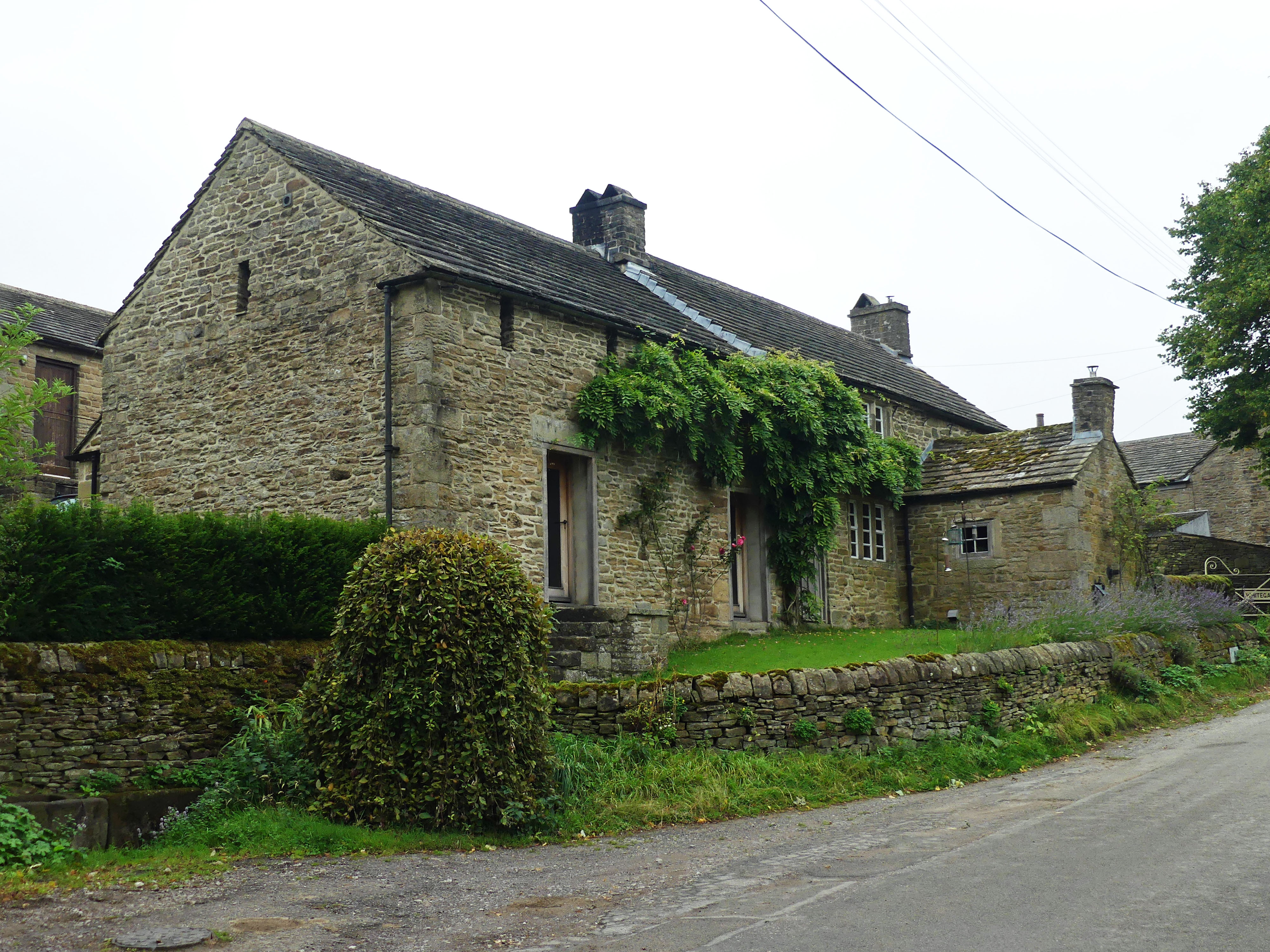
Whitegate House

There is just one listed building in the parish, Whitegate House, which is listed at Grade II, the lowest grade. It is a 17th-century stone-built farmhouse with 19th-century additions.

== Notable residents ==
William Newton, poet, was born near Abney at Cockey Farm.
