= Abney and Abney Grange =

Coordinates: 53.316°N 1.704°W

Abney
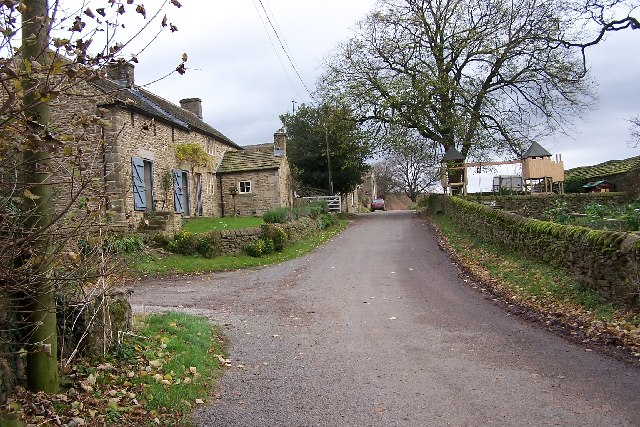
- Abney village

- Abney and Abney Grange parish highlighted within Derbyshire
- OS grid reference: SK198799
- District: Derbyshire Dales
- Shire county: Derbyshire
- Region: East Midlands
- Country: England
- Sovereign state: United Kingdom
- Post town: HOPE VALLEY
- Postcode district: S32
- Police: Derbyshire
- Fire: Derbyshire
- Ambulance: East Midlands

Abney and Abney Grange is a civil parish in the Derbyshire Dales district of Derbyshire, England. It covers the villages of Abney and Abney Grange.

== Notable residents ==
William Newton, poet, was born near Abney at Cockey Farm.
