= Thomas Stanley (puritan) =

English clergyman

Thomas Stanley (c. 1610 – 26 Aug 1670) was an ejected puritan minister whose actions alongside Church of England priest William Mompesson when the Derbyshire parish, Eyam, became infected with the plague during the 17th century averted more widespread catastrophe.

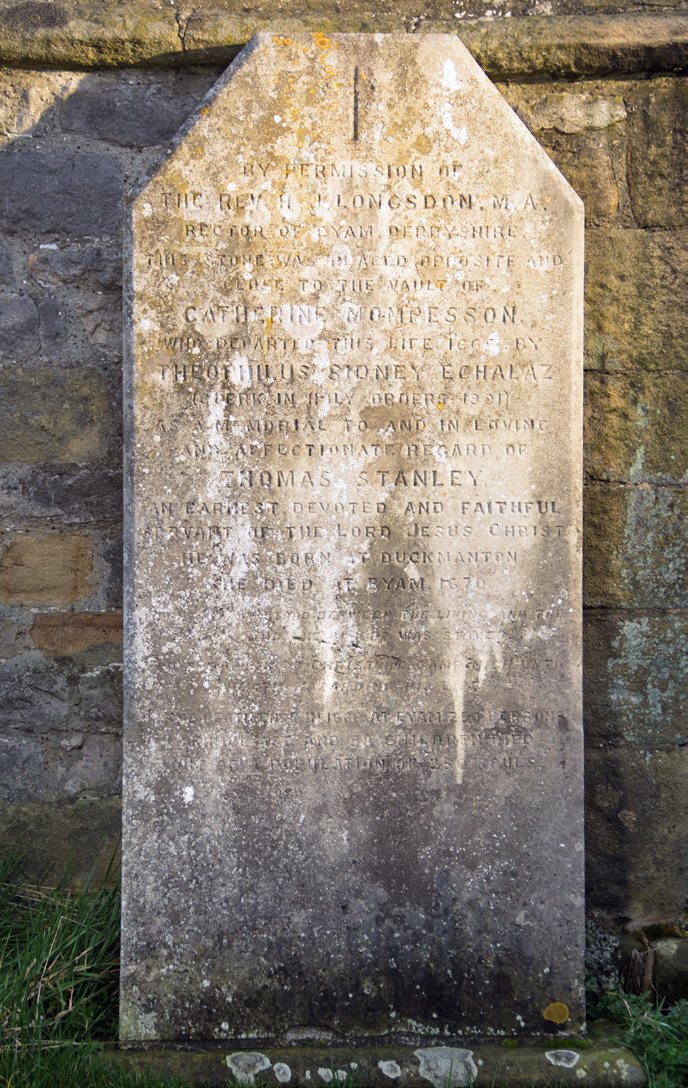
Thomas Stanley's Grave at Eyam.

== Life ==
Stanley was born c. 1610 in Duckmanton. By 1633 he was rector at Dore, before moving onto Ashford in the Water in 1640. By 1644 he was rector at St Lawrence's Church in Eyam, replacing Shorland Adams, a post he held until 1660 when he resigned and left the village, because he refused to comply with the 1662 Act of Uniformity, which made use of the Anglican Book of Common Prayer compulsory. He returned to the village in 1664 following the death of his wife. When the plague arrived, he intended to leave once again; however, he was convinced to stay to write wills for the villagers.

== Death and legacy ==
Stanley died on 26 Aug 1670 at Eyam. A plaque was erected in the village detailing his life.

== See also ==
- St Lawrence's Church, Eyam
- Mompesson's Well
- The Roses of Eyam
