= Cucklet Church =

English cave

- Cucklet Church Cave
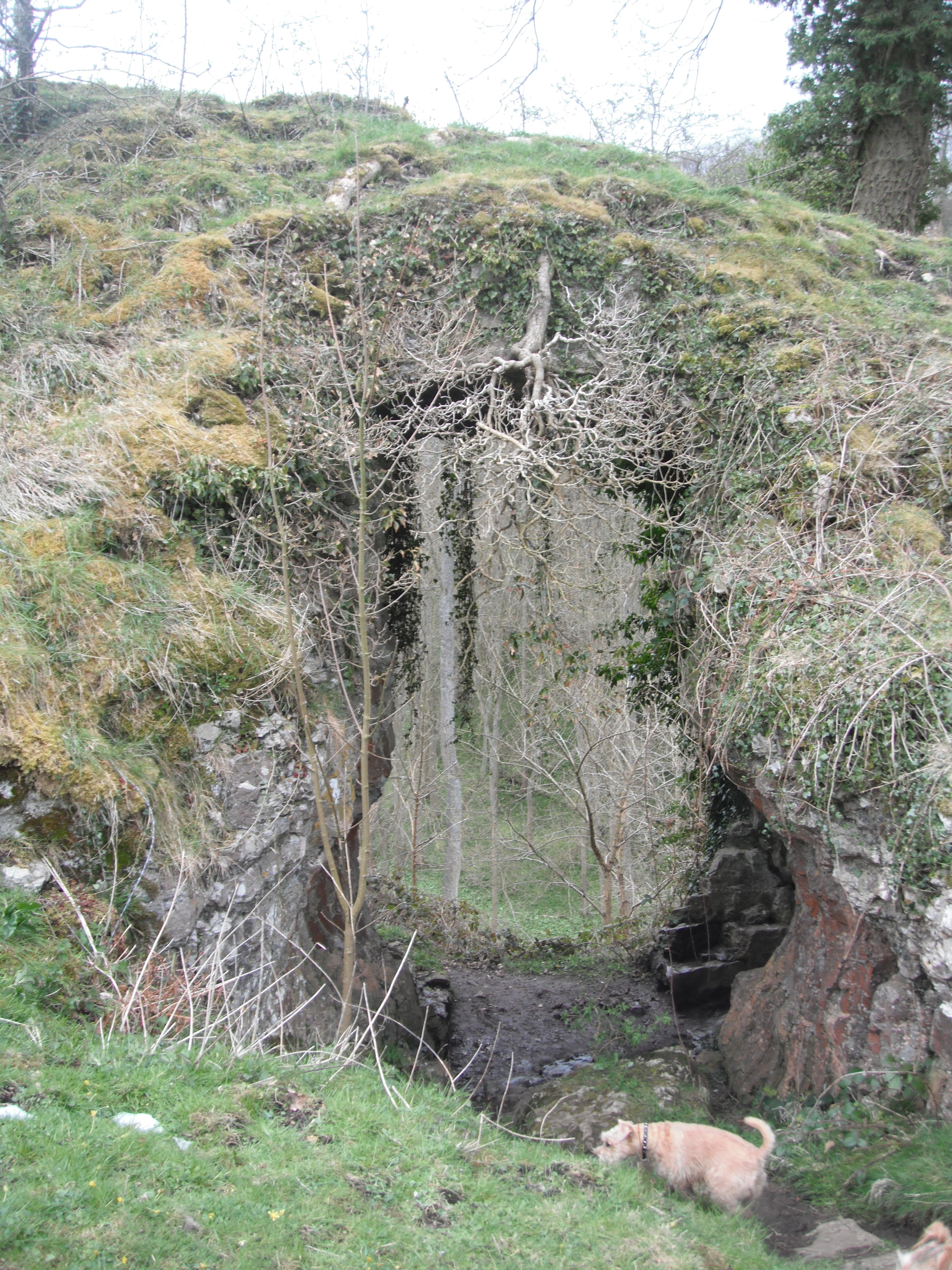

- Location within Derbyshire
- Location: Eyam, Derbyshire
- Coordinates: 53.2824°N 1.6786°W
- Elevation: 800 feet (240 m)
- Entrances: 5
- Difficulty: Grade I
- Access: Permissive

Cucklet Church, formerly known as Cucklet Delph, is a cave west of Jumber Brook in Eyam, Derbyshire.

The book Caves of the Peak District describes it as "A series of through arches in a prominent buttress." It lies within the Stoney Middleton Dale Site of Special Scientific Interest.

== History ==
The cave was used as a church during the 1665 plague outbreak by William Mompesson. The cavern itself was used as Mompesson's pulpit, with local family groups standing in the valley. An annual plague commemoration service is held at the cave.

The 19th-century Sheffield author Samuel Roberts published Cucklet Church, a poem that accompanied a description of Eyam and its history.
