= Hollow Brook =

Coordinates: 53°17′12″N 1°40′07″W

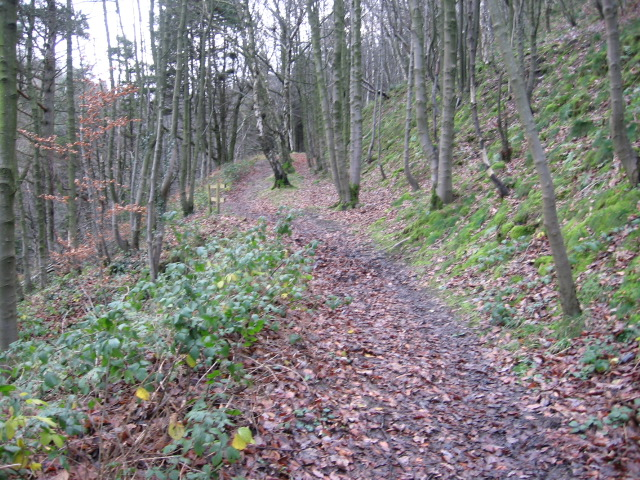
- Footpath above the Hollow Brook

Location
- Country: England

Physical characteristics
- Source
  - location: Abney
- Mouth
  - location: Dale Brook

Hollow Brook is a stream in Eyam in the Derbyshire Peak District. The stream originates to the north of the village between Abney and Leam. The brook flows south through the middle of the village before meeting the Dale Brook in Middleton Dale near Stoney Middleton.

== Hollowbrook Cottage ==
Hollowbrook Cottage is named for the brook. Mr. James Wills is recorded as teaching science and art at Hollowbrook Cottage and Academy in the 1850s.

== See also ==
- List of rivers of England
