= Mompesson's Well =

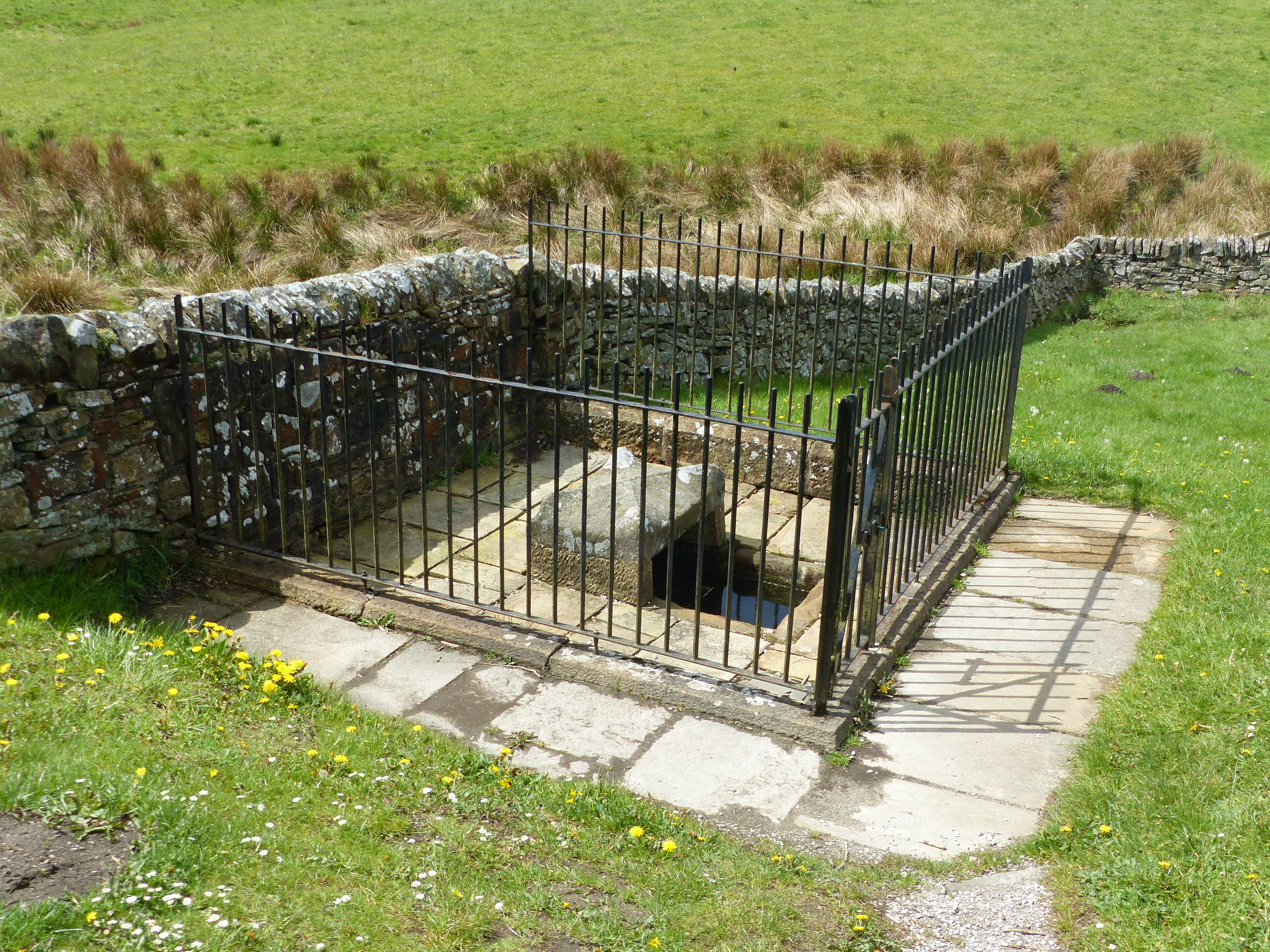
- Mompesson's Well

- Location in Derbyshire
- 53°17′29″N 1°40′03″W
- Location: Eyam, Derbyshire, England

Listed Building – Grade II
- Official name: Well
- Designated: 12 July 1967
- Reference no.: 1347936

Mompesson's Well is a 17th-century grade II listed water well in Eyam, Derbyshire.

== History ==
The well is named for Church of England priest William Mompesson (1639 - 1709), who served at St Lawrence's Church during The Great Plague. Mompessons actions during the plague prevented widespread catastrophe in the parish.

In 1665 plague hit England, and a consignment of cloth bound for Eyam brought with it the infectious fleas which spread the disease. Mompesson, in conjunction with another clergyman, the ejected Puritan, Thomas Stanley, took the courageous decision to isolate the village. In all, 260 of the village's inhabitants, including his wife Catherine, died before the plague claimed its last victim in December 1666.

Mompesson filled the well with vinegar, and used it to sterilize coins that entered and exited the village.

The memorial has been Grade II listed since 12 July 1967.

== See also ==
- Listed buildings in Eyam, Derbyshire
