= Shorland Adams =

English clergyman

Shorland (or Sherland) Adams (c. 1605 – 11 Apr 1664) was a Church of England priest whose outspoken support for the Royalists during the English Civil War garnished his reputation during his tenure in the parishes of Eyam and Treeton.

== Life ==
Reverend Shorland Adams was Rector of Eyam between 1630 and 1644, before being ejected by the Puritans and replaced by Thomas Stanley. Stanley was later ejected and Adams was reinstated in 1660, whilst also remaining rector at Treeton, and he remained the parishes until his death in 1664, being replaced by William Mompesson. Due to his outspoken support for the Royalist cause during the English Civil War, the Parliamentarians imprisoned and stripped Adams of his dwelling.

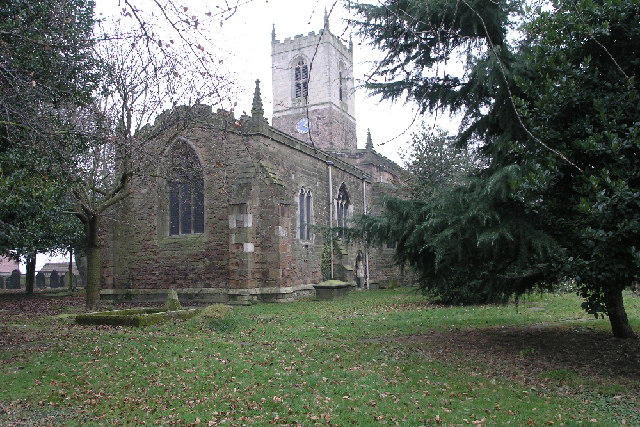
St Helen's Church, Treeton

== Death and legacy ==
Adams died on 11 Apr 1664 at Treeton. He was buried at St Helen's Church, Treeton.

== See also ==
- St Lawrence's Church, Eyam
- St Helen's Church, Treeton
