= Richard Furness =

British poet (1791–1857)

Richard Furness (2 August 1791 – 13 December 1857) was a British poet.

Memorial plaque depicting Richard Furness

== Biography ==
Richard Furness was known as "The Poet of Eyam" after the village in Derbyshire, England where he was born on 2 August 1791. His parents, Samuel and Margaret sent him to school, although he could already read fluently by the age of four. He initially got a job keeping accounts locally but then went as apprentice to a currier in Chesterfield at the age of fourteen. He was able to extend his linguistic skills by learning French from prisoners of war. He learned mathematics and music and at the age of seventeen he was a Wesleyan preacher.

Four years later he walked to London, and enlisted as a soldier. He did not, however, give up preaching. At the request of Dr. Adam Clarke, he spoke at the City Road Chapel. After a year he returned to Derbyshire. He separated from the Methodists at about this time because he wrote a patriotic song which was sung in a public house. In 1813 he started business at Eyam as a currier, but trade was neglected for music, poetry, and mathematics.

His prospects were not improved when in 1816 he ran away with and married Frances Ibbotson of Hathersage. In 1821 he became schoolmaster in the free school at Dore which was then in Derbyshire. He also acted as vestry and parish clerk, but showed his independence of mind and action by invariably closing his book and resuming his seat at the recitation of the Athanasian Creed. He practised medicine and surgery, and when the ancient chapel of Dore was pulled down, his plans for a new church were adopted. He only superintended the erection of the building, but carved the ornamented figures which adorn the structure. On a change of incumbent at Dore he retired from his office of schoolmaster on a pension of £15. The only duties he had now to perform were those of district registrar, which yielded him twelve pounds a year. In no year of his life did his income exceed eighty pounds.

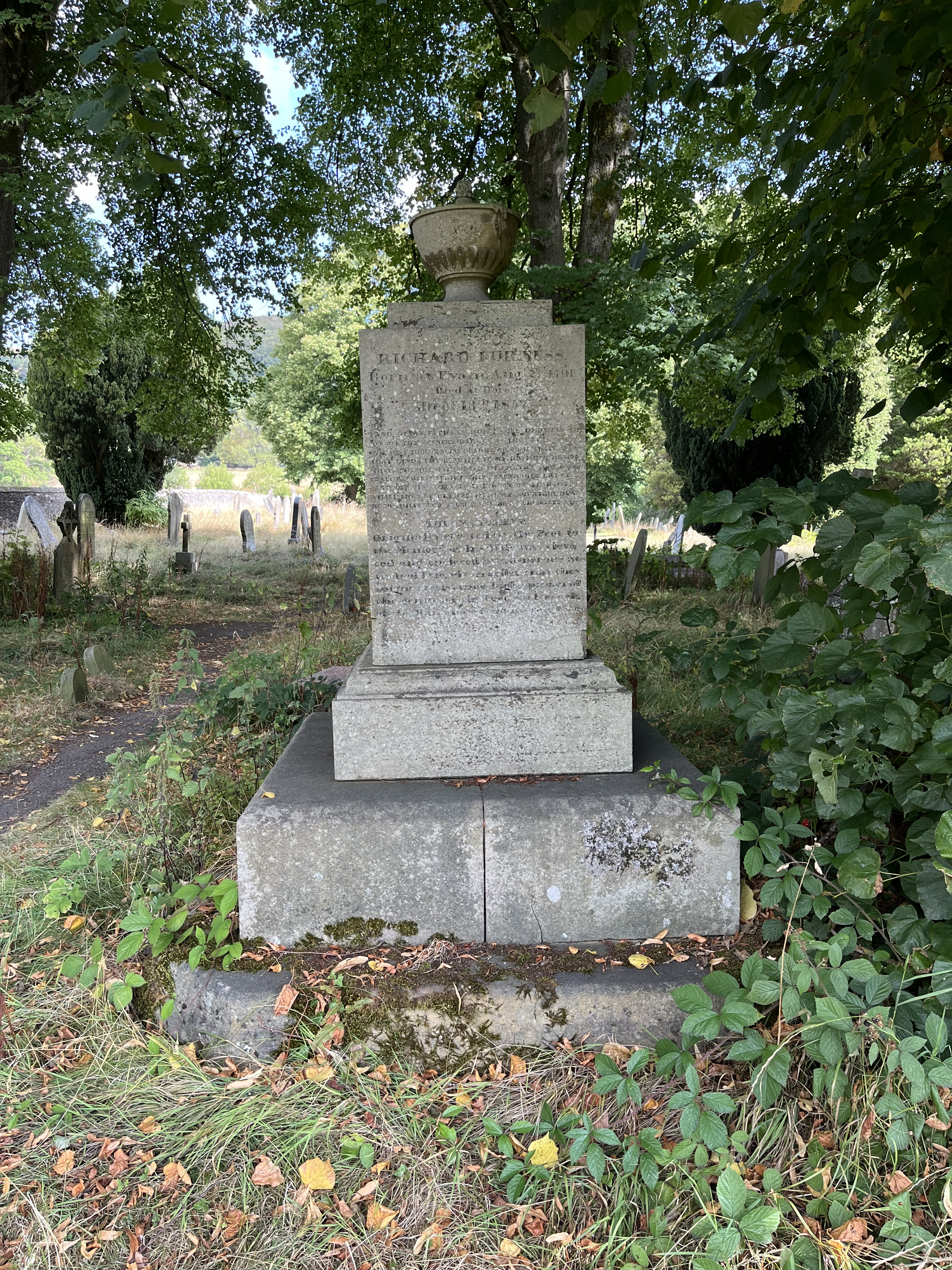
The grave of Richard Furness in the churchyard of St Lawrence's Church, Eyam in 2026

His first publication was a satirical poem entitled the 'Rag Bag’ in 1832. His next was 'Medicus-Magus, a poem, in three cantos,’ Sheffield, 1836, 12mo, in which he depicted the manners, habits, and limited intelligence in the more remote parts of Derbyshire, the local terms being elucidated by a glossary. The title was afterwards altered to 'The Astrologer.' Many of his miscellaneous poems were printed in the 'Sheffield Iris'. After his death a collected edition of his 'Poetical Works’, with a sketch of his life by Dr. G. Calvert Holland, was published (Sheffield, 1858, 8vo). His verse is antiquated but forcible. One of his short pieces, the 'Old Year's Funeral,’ was thought by James Montgomery to be worthy of comparison with Coleridge's ode 'On the Departing Year.'

His wife died in 1844, and in 1850 he took as a second wife, Mary, widow of John Lunn of Staveley, Derbyshire. He died on 13 December 1857, and was buried at Eyam church.
