= Peter Cunningham (priest) =

Reverend Peter Cunningham was probably born in 1747 and died in Chertsey on 24 June 1805. For most of his life he acted as a curate and published several poems of a political tendency.

== Life ==
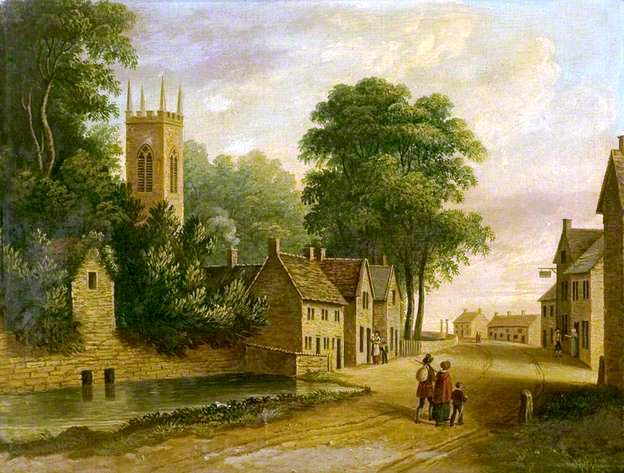
Eyam village as it looked when Cunningham was curate, 1775-90

Accounts of Peter Cunningham's life have mostly been gleaned from the writings and correspondence of the Seward family, covering his period as curate at Eyam in 1775–90, and principally from four letters of his that have been preserved from that period. In addition, two accounts of him are given in 19th century works dealing with Eyam, Ebenezer Rhodes' Peak Scenery and William Wood's The History and Antiquities of Eyam. The account of him given in a past edition of the Dictionary of National Biography is vague and conjectural.

Three letters were written to Thomas Seward immediately before and after his installation as curate at Eyam. He there describes himself as the son of a naval officer who would have preferred him to follow a military career and now cannot be bothered to write to him. Instead of a university education, he was privately coached before being ordained in 1772 by the Archbishop of York. He mentions having friends in Kent, and notably in Deal, from which his first letter was written. He has a close connection with a Yorkshire family from some ten years before his ordination, as well as in Scotland, from where the name Cunningham derives. A later letter to a fellow cleric mentions ‘family letters from the West Indies’. Anna Seward described him as having the manners of a gentleman and he frequently mentions warm relations with, and sometimes the patronage of, members of the peerage.

Following his ordination, Cunningham was appointed as curate at the Yorkshire village of Almondbury, which he left after a while to take up a tutorship which turned out badly. His next appointment was at Eyam and he was at pains to assure his future employer that, in his opinion, the Church of England ‘approaches the nearest of all others to the pure religion of the Gospel’, deprecating the schismatic tendencies in Methodism which were then dividing Eyam parish. He also forewarns Seward that he is very deaf. Anna Seward was later to comment on his near-sightedness, which obliged him to wear spectacles, his untidy appearance and affected nasal delivery. Nevertheless, he was soon to become a favourite with the women of the parish and was noted as being untiring in trying to educate the poor children there, as well as tutoring those of the more socially prominent. His sermons were so much admired that Thomas Seward admitted in one of his own sermons that he had left much of the preaching to Cunningham on this account.

Very soon after his appointment, Cunningham mentions being engaged in literary pursuits and even showed the Rector and his daughter (who was the same age as himself) some of his poems. At the time he was first venturing on publication in 1783, he encountered the labouring-class poet William Newton and introduced him to Anna Seward. She too encouraged his writing and sent a poem of Newton's, addressed "To the Rev. Peter Cunningham, author of Britannia’s Naval Triumph", to The Gentleman’s Magazine (March 1785). As well as expressing gratitude for Cunningham's friendship, it takes up the patriotic theme of the poem and ends with the hope that he will "Still with thy pen thy country's cause defend, Her warmest patriot and her firmest friend." The patriotism did continue and Cunningham showed particular loyalty to the royal family as defenders of the Church of England. He wrote an ode that was sung during celebrations in Chesterfield of the 1788 centenary of the 'Glorious Revolution' and in the following year published A sermon preached at Eyam, Derbyshire, on Thursday the 23d of April, 1789, being the day appointed for a general thanksgiving for His Majesty's happy recovery.

In his letter to the Reverend Thomas Wilson written in 1788, Cunningham referred to 'the former variegated and adversely shaded part of my life' before taking the curacy at Eyam, which replicates his mention of earlier misfortune and hardship in his first letter to Seward. But now, he continues, 'I have thoroughly reconciled myself to the obscurity and sequestered nature of my situation'. After the publication of The Naval Triumph, George Rodney had offered to help find him a situation in Ireland but he had refused this, as he did initially an offer of the chaplaincy to the British factory at Smyrna so long as there was still the possibility of staying on at Eyam after Seward gave up the rectorship. Forced at last to accept the chaplaincy, he left for Smyrna in 1790 and in order to meet expenses had to sell his books and other possessions. During the years he spent in Turkey he nearly lost his life in a shipwreck, and then in a fire on land which destroyed all his papers. Reduced once more to the utmost poverty, he set out to walk back to Britain across Turkish territory, until he discovered a timely gift of money left in a book of poems with which he had been presented on leaving.

On his return, he took up a curacy in Chertsey, partly through the support of Charles James Fox, the dedicatee of his poem St Anne's Hill. In June 1805 he died suddenly at the annual dinner of the Chertsey Friendly Society, to which he had been in the habit of preaching a sermon every year. After his death, his debts and funeral expenses were paid with the financial support of local gentry, thus bringing full circle a career marked by disappointed hopes which the support of the titled among whom he moved could do little to alleviate.

== Poetry ==
Cunningham published several poems anonymously, often combining topography with political themes. Their style was characterised by Ebenezer Rhodes as "elegant and tasteful in expression…but cold in feeling. His lines, though generally graceful, and not unfrequently polished to excellence, are occasionally cumbrous and sluggish from an excess of epithet…As a poet he had many beauties, checkered with a considerable proportion of defect." Their procession of allegorical abstractions and Latinate poeticisms was complained of as hindering his meaning. "Everything is buried in gloom and obscurity. In other words, we are presented with a great deal of pompous and high-sounding language which leaves no distinct impression on our minds." A good example of his writing, which changed little over 25 years, is contained in this quatrain from his description of Chatsworth House:

But see – 'the faded forms of Sorrow' fly
Before gay Minstrelsey's enliv'ning Pow'rs,
And fair Euphrosyne with sparkling Eye,
In yon bright Palace, leads the golden Hours.

The poem was published in the same year as his The naval triumph. The latter was written in commemoration of Admiral Rodney's victory over the French fleet at the Battle of the Saintes in 1782 and published in what Cunningham described in his letter to the Reverend Thomas Wilson (1788) as 'an incorrect and mutilated edition'. The poem that followed it was Chatsworth, or the Genius of England's prophecy (Chesterfield 1783). The poem describes the great mansion and surrounding landscape, linking the history of its Cavendish owners with the patriotic themes of martial honour and freedom.

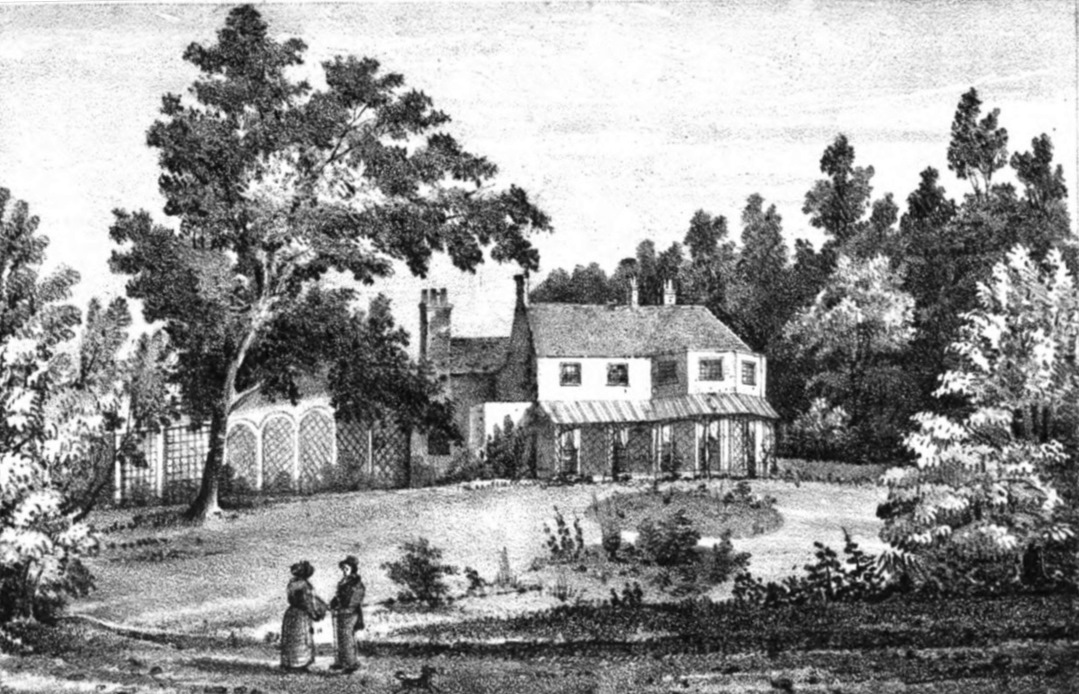
The topographical frontispiece from St Anne's Hill

A further political forecast was written in 1785 (but not published until two years later): The Russian prophecy, a poem occasioned by a remarkable phenomenon in the heavens, observed in Russia, February 19, 1785. The title page bears the inscription 'Sacred to the glory and imperial virtues of Catharine the Great, Empress of all the Russias', and the author arranged for several copies to be sent by the Russian ambassador to St Petersburg. In this poem the Genius of Russia foretells the decline of the Ottoman Empire and the establishment of a Russian dynasty on the throne of Constantinople, in anticipation of the Russo-Turkish War (1787–92)

Two more topographical poems deal with locations in Surrey. Leith Hill (London 1789) followed in the tradition of John Denham's Cooper's Hill, while St Anne's Hill (Chertsey 1800) deals with the mansion of the politician Charles James Fox, to whom the poem was dedicated on his birthday that year. Fox had withdrawn from Parliament at the time and party opponents had made his place of retirement their butt in such satires as "Imitation of Bion written at St Anne's Hill" and "The Shade of Alexander Pope on the banks of the Thames" (1799). Cunningham had always made sure to reveal his anonymous authorship where it would be to his benefit, as it was in this case. The poem was also the most successful of Cunningham's works in another sense, achieving two more editions after his death.
