= Listed buildings in Eyam =

Eyam is a civil parish in the Derbyshire Dales district of Derbyshire, England. The parish contains 55 listed buildings that are recorded in the National Heritage List for England. Of these, one is listed at Grade I, the highest of the three grades, two are at Grade II*, the middle grade, and the others are at Grade II, the lowest grade. The parish contains the village of Eyam and the surrounding countryside. The history of the village is notable because when the plague broke out in 1666, the village went into voluntary quarantine to prevent the disease from spreading outside. Some of the listed buildings are associated with this event, including cottages occupied by the victims of the disease, and their gravestones. Most of the other listed buildings are houses, cottages and farmhouses and associated structures. The other listed buildings include a church, a cross and tombs in the churchyard, the rectory, a well head, water troughs, a set of stocks, and the former engine house to a lead mine,

== Key ==
Grade	Criteria
I	Buildings of exceptional interest, sometimes considered to be internationally important
II*	Particularly important buildings of more than special interest
II	Buildings of national importance and special interest

== Buildings ==
Name and location	Photograph	Date	Notes	Grade
Churchyard cross 53.28411°N 1.67467°W		Early 9th century	The cross in the churchyard of St Lawrence's Church is in stone, and consists of a square base and a tapering shaft with a Celtic cross. Its decoration is complex and well organised, and includes interlace carving, and two figurative scenes depicting the Virgin and Christ, and an angel with trumpet. On the head of the cross are carvings of angels in panels.	I
St Lawrence's Church; 53.28429°N 1.67483°W		13th century	The church was remodelled in the 15th century and partly rebuilt in 1618, it was restored and extended by G. E. Street in 1868–70, and the south aisle and the porch were rebuilt in 1882–83 by John Dodsley Webster. The chancel is built in limestone with a tile roof, and the rest of the church is in gritstone with a lead roof. The church consists of a nave with a clerestory, north and south aisles, a south porch, a chancel with a north vestry, and a west tower. The tower has two stages, diagonal buttresses, a two-light west window with a pointed arch and a datestone above, a clock face on the south side, two-light bell openings, a moulded string course with gargoyles, and an embattled parapet with crocketed corner pinnacles. On the south chancel wall is an ornate sundial.	II*
The Olde House and garage 53.28736°N 1.67998°W		1615	The house and barn, later converted into a garage, are in gritstone with quoins, and a stone slate roof with coped gables and moulded kneelers. There are two storeys and two bays, and the single-bay garage to the left. The doorway has a chamfered quoined surround, a slightly arched head, a lintel with shields, and a central initialled and dated plaque, and a stepped hood mould. The windows are mullioned, and there are two coped gabled dormers, each with a coat of arms in the gable.	II
Ruins of Bradshaw Hall; 53.28713°N 1.67802°W		Early 17th century	A country house now in ruins, it is in gritstone with quoins and without a roof. There are two storeys and an irregular plan. The remaining openings include mullioned and transomed cross windows, and a doorcase with a quoined and chamfered surround.	II
2 and 3 Church Avenue; 53.28439°N 1.67545°W		17th century	A pair of cottages at right angles, in limestone and gritstone, with gritstone dressings, quoins, and a roof of stone slate with chamfered gable copings and kneelers to the south. There are two storeys, No. 2 has a single bay, and No. 3 has two. No. 2 has a doorway with a quoined surround, mullioned windows, and a bull's eye window in a moulded surround with four keystones. No. 3 has a doorway with a plain surround, mullioned windows, and a horizontally-sliding sash window.	II
Eyam Hall; 53.28489°N 1.67660°W		17th century	A small country house in gritstone, partly rendered, with quoins, continuous moulded string courses forming hood moulds, parapets with moulded copings, and stone slate roofs with moulded gables and kneelers. There are two storeys and four bays, and a two-storey west wing. The house has an H-shaped plan, the south front with a two-bay central range and projecting gabled wings. The central doorway has pilasters and a raised keystone, and the windows are mullioned. The east front has three gables, and at the rear is a gabled stair tower.	II*
Merrill House; 53.28715°N 1.67967°W		17th century	The house is in rendered stone with gritstone dressings and a stone slate roof. There are two storeys and two bays. The central doorway has a chamfered quoined surround, and the windows are mullioned with casements. There is a continuous hood mould over the ground floor openings, and separate hood moulds in the upper floor.	II
Mompesson's Well; 53.29127°N 1.66720°W		17th century	The well head is in gritstone. It consists of a stone trough, covered to the west by a rectangular slab, and crossed by humped ribs. The well head is enclosed by iron railings.	II
Plague Cottage and Rose Cottage; 53.28427°N 1.67573°W		17th century	A pair of gritstone cottages with quoins, and stone slate roofs with a coped gable and moulded kneeler on the west. There are two storeys and four bays. The doorways have flush surrounds, and the windows are horizontally-sliding sashes.	II
Tomb 7 metres south of church porch 53.28405°N 1.67481°W		Mid-17th century	The tomb in the churchyard of St Lawrence's Church is in gritstone, and is a table tomb. On the east and west ends are panels with carvings in relief depicting a skull and crossbones, a winged angel head, and an hourglass. Elsewhere, there are fluted pilasters, flowers in vases, and urns. The slab has moulded sides and no inscription.	II
Wall and water troughs 53.28669°N 1.67779°W		17th century	The water troughs and wall alongside the road are in gritstone. There are three large troughs, and a retaining wall to the north.	II
Lydgate Graves and wall 53.28335°N 1.67050°W		1666	There is a pair of plague gravestones inscribed with the date and the details of two members of the Darby family. The area is enclosed by coped stone walls.	II
Riley Graves and Graveyard; 53.28395°N 1.65863°W		1666	The graveyard is in an isolated location and is enclosed by gritstone walls. It contains six gravestones and a table tomb, all to the memory of members of the Hancocke family.	II
Tomb of Catherine Mompesson; 53.28416°N 1.67464°W		1666	The tomb of Catherine Mompesson, wife of William Mompesson, is in the churchyard of St Lawrence's Church, and is a table tomb in stone on a stepped base. On each face are inset panels, and on the corners are baluster-type pilasters. The north and south sides have raised armorial shields, and on other faces are inscriptions and depictions of hourglasses. The top slab has moulded edges and an inscription.	II
Tomb of H. Merrill; 53.28811°N 1.68032°W		1666	The is in an isolated site, and is a table tomb in gritstone. The tomb is plain with a flat top inscribed with initials and the date.	II
Hall Farmhouse; 53.28538°N 1.67729°W		1761	The farmhouse is in gritstone, partly rendered, with quoins, and a roof in tile and stone slate. There are two storeys and three bays. The doorway has a lintel with initials and the date inscribed in a shield. There is a single-light window, and the other windows are mullioned, all with casements.	II
Barn northwest of Eyam Hall; 53.28526°N 1.67716°W		Late 17th century	The barn, which incorporates a byre and a hayloft, is in gritstone with quoins, and a stone slate roof with moulded gable copings and kneelers on the south. There are two storeys and four bays, and a later single-story extension to the east. On the west front is a doorway with a chamfered quoined surround and a massive lintel, and on the east front is a doorway with a chamfered quoined surround, and a segmental-headed archway.	II
Barn west of Eyam Hall; 53.28503°N 1.67722°W		Late 17th century	The barn, which incorporates a byre and a hayloft and which has been converted for other uses, is in limestone and gritstone with quoins, and a stone slate roof with moulded gable copings and kneelers. There are two storeys and four bays, and at the east is a projecting single-storey bay. On the front are two doorways with quoined surrounds, one converted into a window, a large archway, a flight of external steps, and in the upper floor are three hayloft doors.	II
Garden House and wall, Eyam Hall; 53.28442°N 1.67603°W		Late 17th century	The garden house is in limestone and gritstone with gritstone dressings, quoins, and a stone slate roof with moulded gables and kneelers. There are two storeys and one bay. In the east and west fronts are doorways with chamfered and quoined surrounds, and on the north front is a flight of steps leading to an upper floor doorway with a moulded surround. The windows are mullioned. Attached to the house and continuing round the garden is a wall in limestone and gritstone with chamfered coping, and one section in red brick with gritstone bands.	II
Gates and attached walls and terrace, Eyam Hall; 53.28481°N 1.67673°W		Late 17th century	At the entrance to the grounds, three semicircular steps lead up to iron gates flanked by square piers, with bands, decorated panels, moulded cornices, and ball finials. Outside these are gritstone walls with chamfered copings, and to the west is a gateway with a quoined chamfered surround, and moulded capitals. Inside the grounds, five semicircular steps lead up to a paved terrace that has a gritstone retaining wall with chamfered copings.	II
Outbuilding southwest of Eyam Hall; 53.28490°N 1.67700°W		Late 17th century	The outbuilding is in limestone and gritstone with gritstone dressings, quoins, and a stone slate roof with moulded gable copings and kneelers. There are two storeys and two bays. In the centre is a doorway with a quoined surround and a moulded inner edge, a large lintel, and a hood mould, and the windows are mullioned. External steps with a coped wall lead up to a doorway in the south gable end.	II
Village Stocks; 53.28462°N 1.67710°W		Late 17th century	The stocks consist of two gritstone piers, one with a curved top, and both have long slits on the inner surfaces. The cross bars are wooden and contain four holes.	II
Tomb 12 metres southeast of church porch 53.28409°N 1.67458°W		Early 18th century	The tomb in the churchyard of St Lawrence's Church is in stone, and is a table tomb. The base has panelled sides and a moulded band. The slab has gadrooned edges, acanthus leaves on the corners, and an illegible inscription.	II
1 Church Avenue; 53.28420°N 1.67555°W		18th century	A cottage in limestone and gritstone, with gritstone dressings, quoins, and a roof of tile and stone slate with moulded gable copings and kneelers. There are two storeys and an irregular plan, and contains plank doors and casement windows. To the west is an attached gabled cottage with mullioned windows.	II
10 Church Street and two attached cottages 53.28366°N 1.67352°W		18th century	A row of three gritstone cottages on a plinth, with quoins and a stone slate roof. There are two storeys, and each cottage has a single bay. On the front are three doorways with flush surrounds, and the windows are a mix of horizontally-sliding sashes and casements.	II
Barn northwest of the Coach House; 53.28408°N 1.67584°W		18th century	The barn, later converted for other uses, is in gritstone with quoins and a tile roof with moulded gable copings and kneelers. There are two storeys and two bays. Some of the windows are mullioned, and there is a hayloft door.	II
Dale Head; 53.28403°N 1.67211°W	—	18th century	The house, possibly with a 17th-century core, is in stone, partly rendered, with quoins and a stone slate roof. There are two storeys, a double-depth range, and a single bay. The doorway has a flush surround, above it is a casement window, and the other windows are mullioned.	II
Derwent Cottage and Derwent House; 53.28365°N 1.67352°W		Mid-18th century	A pair of gritstone houses with chamfered quoins, and stone slate roofs with coped gables and moulded kneelers. There are two storeys, and each house has three storeys, a central doorway with rusticated jambs and a semicircular pediment. The outer bays contain Venetian windows with imposts and raised keystones; the central lights are sashes, and the outer lights are casements.	II
Highcliffe Farmhouse and Jumber Cottage; 53.29348°N 1.68057°W		Mid-18th century	A farmhouse divided into two houses, it is in gritstone with quoins, and a stone slate roof with moulded gable copings and kneelers. There are three storeys and two bays. A doorway has been converted into a window, a doorway has been inserted, and the windows are mullioned.	II
Laburnum Cottage; 53.28575°N 1.67723°W		Mid-18th century	The cottage is in gritstone with quoins, and a stone slate roof with coped gables and moulded kneelers. There are two storeys, two bays, and a later extension to the left with a rounded corner. On the front is a latticed wooden porch, and the windows are mullioned with sashes.	II
Outbuilding south of Merrill House; 53.28709°N 1.67986°W		18th century	The outbuilding, later converted for residential use, is in gritstone with quoins, and a stone slate roof. There are two storeys and two bays. In the ground floor are two doorways and a fixed window, and the upper floor contains a two-light mullioned window.	II
Plague Cottage; 53.28421°N 1.67558°W		18th century	A cottage, possibly with a 17th-century core, it is in limestone and gritstone with gritstone dressings, quoins, and a roof of stone slate and tile, with coped gables and moulded kneelers. There are two storeys and two bays. The doorway has been inserted, and the windows are mullioned.	II
The Firs; 53.28772°N 1.67383°W	—	Mid-18th century	A gritstone house with quoins, and a stone slate roof with coped gables and moulded kneelers. There are two storeys and three bays. In the centre is a doorway and the windows are mullioned.	II
Bagshaw House and outbuildings 53.28401°N 1.67562°W		Late 18th century	The house is in gritstone with quoins, and a stone slate roof with a coped gable and moulded kneelers to the right. There are two storeys and two bays, and a recessed single-bay outbuilding to the right. In the centre is a doorway with a moulded surround and a bracketed moulded stone hood, and the windows on the front are sashes. The outbuilding has a segmental-arched doorway and a divided fanlight, and above is a hayloft opening. At the rear are mullioned windows.	II
Edge Lea; 53.28655°N 1.67775°W		Late 18th century	A gritstone house with quoins and a slate roof. There are two storeys and two bays. The central doorway has a quoined surround, above which is a stilted semicircular window with a keystone, and the other windows are sashes.	II
Mompesson Cottages; 53.28439°N 1.67233°W		Late 18th century	A pair of cottages that were extended in the 19th century, they are in gritstone with quoins, and a stone slate roof with coped gables and moulded kneelers. There are two storeys, two bays, and a recessed single-bay extension on the left. In the original part are two doorways and mullioned windows, and the extension, which is rendered, contains a doorway and casement windows.	II
Upper Birch Row; 53.28468°N 1.66918°W		Late 18th century	A row of three gritstone cottages with quoins, and a stone slate roof with coped gables and moulded kneelers. There are two storeys, and each cottage has one bay. The doorway have flush surrounds, and the windows are mullioned.	II
Aughton House; 53.28396°N 1.67526°W		Early 19th century	The house is in rendered red brick with stone dressings, chamfered quoins, a sill band, a coved eaves cornice, and a slate roof with coped gables and plain kneelers. There are two storeys and three bays. The central doorway has rusticated jambs and a fanlight with diamond tracery. The windows are sashes with keystones.	II
Church Cottage, Church View and attached house 53.28378°N 1.67460°W		Early 19th century	A row of cottages in gritstone with quoins and a stone slate roof. There are two storeys and four bays. On the front are three doorways with plain surrounds, and the windows are sashes.	II
Eyam House; 53.28859°N 1.68748°W	—	Early 19th century	The house, which was extended later in the century, is in gritstone with hipped Westmorland slate roofs. The original part has two storeys and three bays, and the recessed extension has two storeys and attics, and two bays. The main front has corner pilasters, a band, and a moulded cornice. Steps lead up to the central doorway that has pilasters, and a shallow pediment with acroteria. To the south is a rectangular bay window, the other windows in the original part are sashes, and in the extension they are mullioned.	II
Gate piers, Eyam House; 53.28877°N 1.68756°W	—	Early 19th century	There are three gate piers. They are in gritstone, square and rusticated, and 8 feet (2.4 m)} high. Each pier has a moulded cornice and a ball finial.	II
Gate piers between Eyam House and Eyam View Farmhouse; 53.28870°N 1.68782°W	—	Early 19th century	The gate piers are in gritstone, square and rusticated, and 8 feet (2.4 m)} high. Each pier has a moulded cornice and a ball finial.	II
Eyam View Farm Buildings; 53.28882°N 1.68823°W		Early 19th century	The farm buildings are in limestone with gritstone dressings and stone slate roofs, and consist of three ranges around a square. In the northwest corner is a pigeon loft with a pyramidal roof, a semicircular-headed opening with a keystone, and pigeon holes and shelves. Elsewhere, there are doorways and windows, and in the north range is a line of segmental-headed arches with quoined surrounds.	II
Eyam View Farmhouse; 53.28868°N 1.68785°W		Early 19th century	The farmhouse is in limestone with gritstone dressings and quoins, and a stone slate roof with coped gables and moulded kneelers. There are two storeys, a double range plan, and three bays, and a later rear extension. On the front are three full-height, semicircular-headed blind arches and a doorway, and the windows are sashes.	II
Fern Lea; 53.28438°N 1.67126°W		Early 19th century	A gritstone cottage with a stone slate roof, two storeys and two bays. The central doorway has a fanlight and a bracketed hood, and the windows are sashes.	II
Forester's House; 53.28440°N 1.67111°W		Early 19th century	A house in gritstone with quoins, a stone slate roof, two storeys and two bays. The doorway has a fanlight, and the windows are sashes, all with flush surrounds.	II
Lady Wash Farmhouse; 53.29607°N 1.67177°W	—	Early 19th century	The farmhouse is in gritstone with quoins and a stone slate roof. There are two storeys, two bays, and a rear wing. The doorway has a flush surround, and the windows are mullioned.	II
New Engine Mine Engine House; 53.29295°N 1.66509°W	—	Early 19th century	Formerly the engine house to a lead mine, it is in gritstone with quoins, a stone slate roof, and two storeys. It contains various openings, and inside is a massive tie-beam for lifting heavy weights. To the southwest is the base of the demolished chimney.	II
Shepherd's Flat Farmhouse; 53.29326°N 1.69981°W	—	Early 19th century	A farmhouse in rendered stone on a plinth, with gritstone dressings, quoins, sill bands, a moulded eaves cornice, and a hipped stone slate roof. There are two storeys and three bays. The central doorway has a semicircular head, stepped jambs, fluted imposts and brackets, a traceried fanlight, and a moulded hood, and the windows are sashes.	II
The Brick House and railings 53.28447°N 1.67685°W		Early 19th century	The house is in red brick, rendered on the side, with stone dressings, a moulded eaves cornice, and a hipped stone slate roof. There are two storeys and three bays. In the centre is a lattice porch and a semicircular-headed doorway with a traceried fanlight. The windows are sashes, the window to the right of the doorway with a segmental head, and the others with flat heads. To the front and right of the house are low stone walls with chamfered copings and iron railings. In front of the house are stone gate piers with rounded tops and decorative iron gates.	II
Wayside and Roselyn; 53.28435°N 1.67137°W		Early 19th century	A pair of gritstone cottages with quoins and a stone slate roof. There are two storeys and each cottage has one bay. The doorways have flush surrounds, and the windows are sashes.	II
Delf View and stables 53.28418°N 1.67617°W		c. 1825	The house and former stable block, now incorporated into the house, are in gritstone with a floor band, a cornice, and hipped stone slate roofs. The house has two storeys and five bays, the middle bay projecting. In the centre is a porch with pilasters, an entablature and a parapet, the doorway has a fanlight, and the windows are sashes. The former stable has a single storey and two bays, and a corbelled eaves gutter. It contains a stepped semicircular arch, now filled with a window, and sash windows.	II
Walls, gate piers and water troughs east of Eyam Hall; 53.28441°N 1.67632°W		19th century	The wall is in gritstone, it has triangular coping, and contains four sets of gate piers. To the west it is recessed and contains two stone water troughs, one larger than the other.	II
Stanley House; 53.28366°N 1.67418°W		Mid-19th century	A pair of gritstone houses with a stone slate roof, two storeys, and three bays. Steps lead up the central paired doorways that have moulded hoods. The windows are sashes, and at the rear is a pointed stair window.	II
The Rectory; 53.28408°N 1.67391°W		1960	The rectory was rebuilt, incorporating material from the 17th and 18th centuries. It is in limestone and gritstone with gritstone dressings, quoins and a stone slate roof. There are two storeys and two bays. The doorway has re-used 18th-century moulded brackets. The windows vary; some are mullioned, some are casements, and there is a mullioned and transomed stair cross window.	II
