= Eyam Hall =

Coordinates: 53.2849°N 1.6767°W

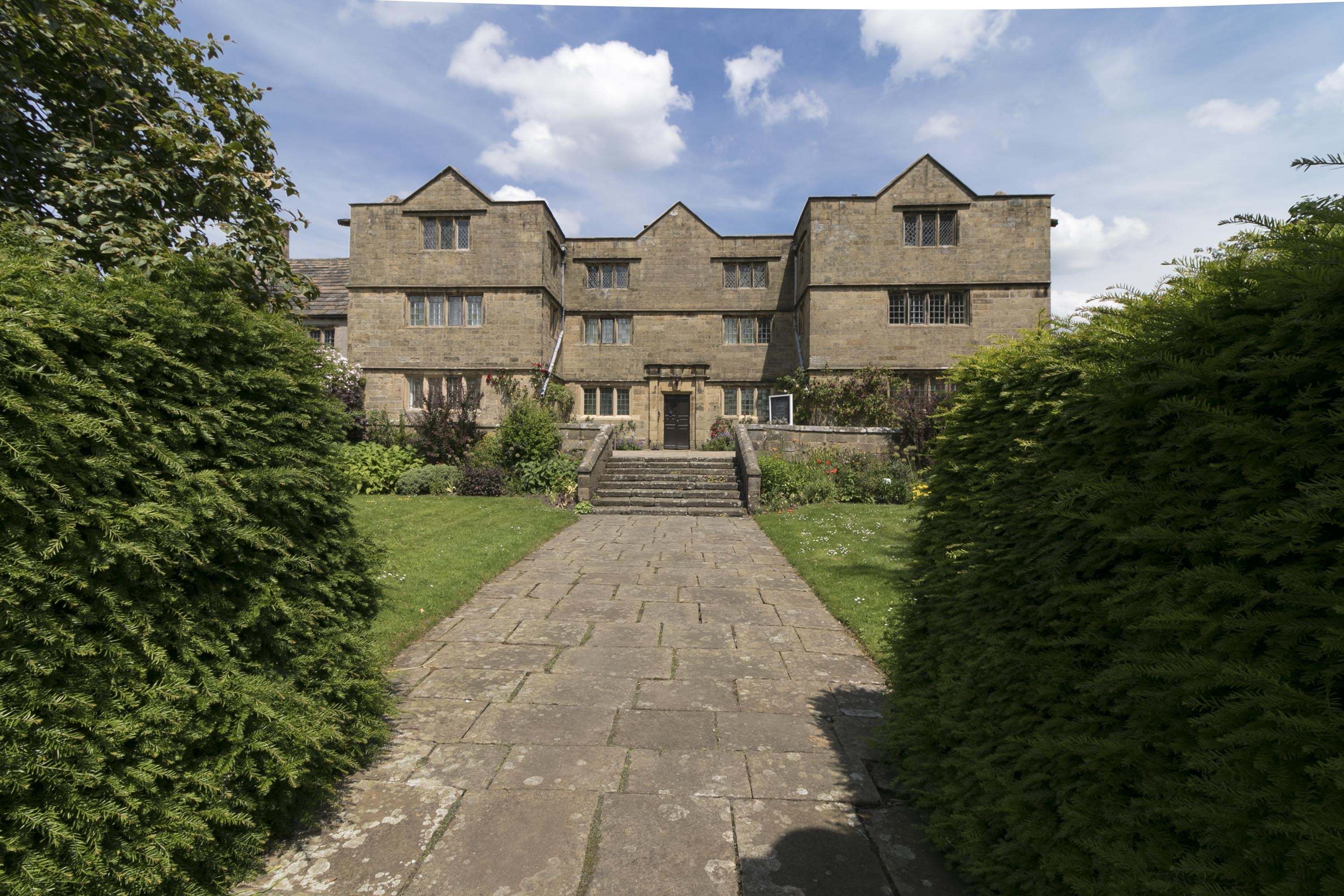
- Eyam Hall in 2017

- Location within Derbyshire
- OS grid reference: SK2165576485

History
- Built for: John and Elizabeth Wright

Listed Building – Grade II*
- Official name: Eyam Hall
- Designated: 29 September 1951
- Reference no.: 1334913

Eyam Hall is a country house within the civil parish of Eyam, Derbyshire, located to the west of St Lawrence's Church, Eyam. It is recorded in the National Heritage List for England as a Grade II* listed building.

Eyam Hall was leased to the National Trust from 2013 until 2018.

== History ==
The Wright family were landowners in Eyam although their family was historically based in Longstone. William Wright gave his land in Eyam to his second son Thomas who is credited with building the hall. Thomas's son John sold his father's house in Unthank and based his branch of the family in Eyam. The hall began life as a generous wedding present in 1671 for John Wright and his new wife Elizabeth. It has been in the Wright family for nine generations and is currently a family home and wedding venue that opens at different times of the year. The historic house is situated in picturesque part of Derbyshire and is an unspoilt example of a gritstone Jacobean manor house. The National Trust leased the hall for 5 years in March 2013, however, their lease has now ended and the Hall is back in the hands of the family full-time.

== General information ==
The Hall and garden are open at different times each year. There is a craft centre and restaurant adjacent to the hall. The shops and cafe are open all year round (except January) from 10 to 4.30 p.m. Eyam Hall is a Grade II* listed building.

== See also ==
- Grade II* listed buildings in Derbyshire Dales
- Listed buildings in Eyam
- List of places in Derbyshire
