= Dale Brook =

Coordinates: 53°16′36″N 1°39′42″W

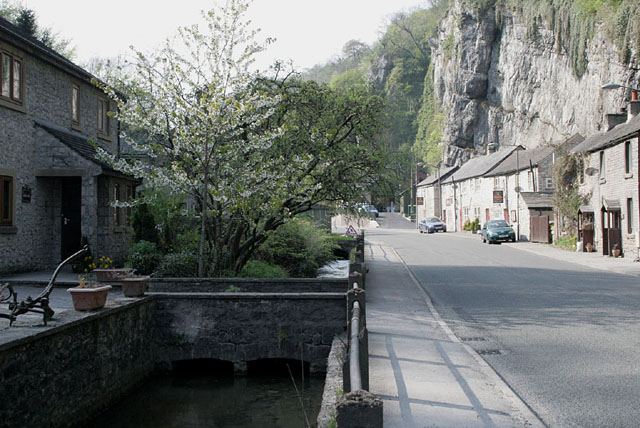
- Dale Brook in Stoney Middleton

Location
- Country: England

Physical characteristics
- Source
  - location: Jumber Brook
- Mouth
  - location: Stoke Brook

Dale Brook is a stream in Stoney Middleton in the Derbyshire Peak District. The stream originates in Middleton Dale, where the Jumber Brook south of Eyam passes under the A623 becoming Dale Brook. The brook flows east through Stoney Middleton where it meets the Stoke Brook before joining the River Derwent at Calver.

== See also ==
- List of rivers of England
