= Riley Graveyard =

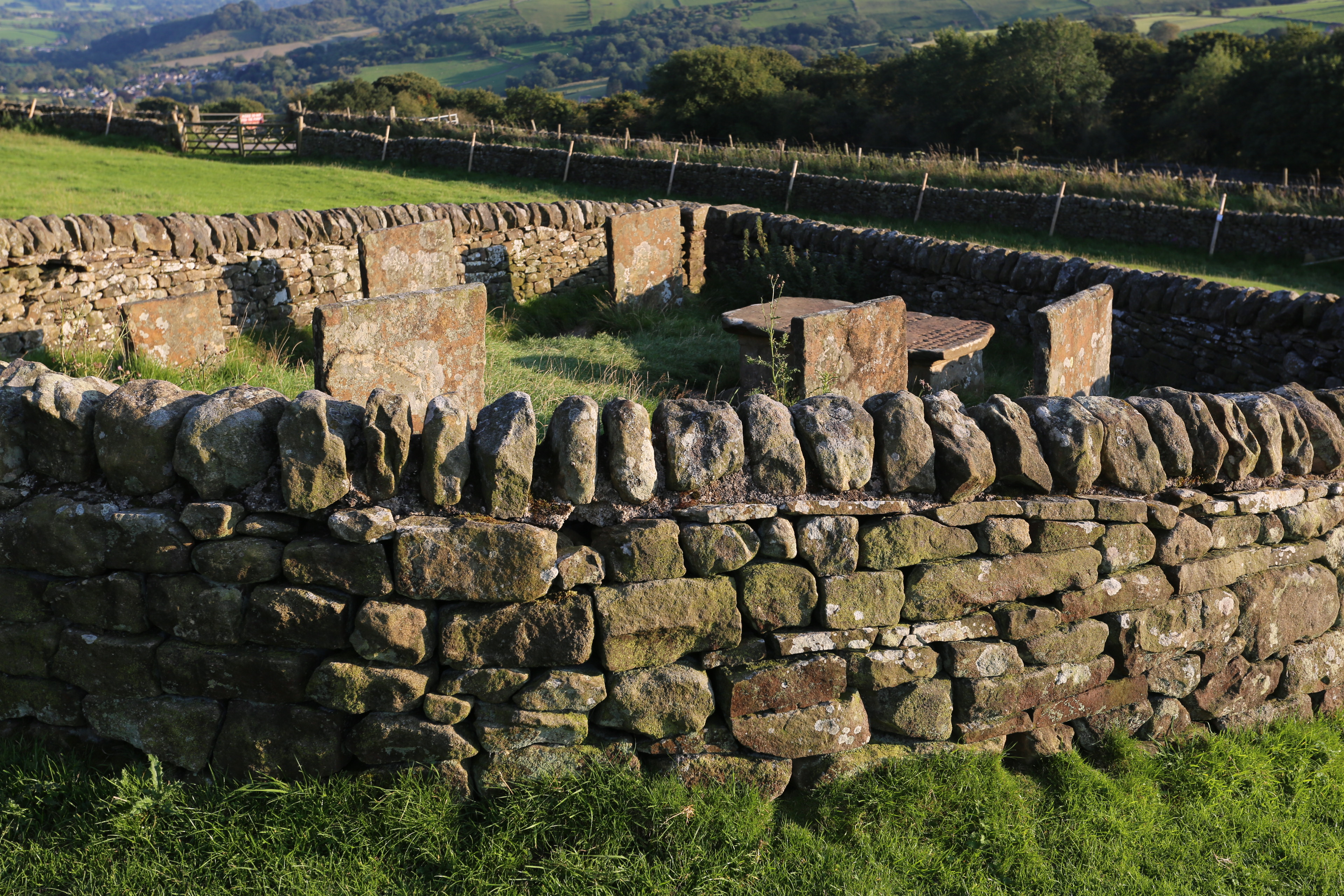
- Riley Graveyard

- Location in Derbyshire
- 53°17′02″N 1°39′31″W
- Location: Eyam, Derbyshire, England

Listed Building – Grade II
- Official name: Cemetery
- Designated: 12 October 1984
- Reference no.: 1109993

Riley Graveyard is a 17th-century grade II listed cemetery in Eyam, Derbyshire.

== History ==
The cemetery, on the outskirts of Eyam, contains the graves of the Hancock family who died during the outbreak of the plague that spread from London to the village in 1666. Elizabeth Hancock buried her husband and six children, carrying the remains up the hill to the burial site. Following the end of the plague, Elizabeth relocated to Sheffield to live with her sole remaining son.

The memorial has been Grade II listed since 12 October 1984.

== See also ==
- Listed buildings in Eyam
