= St Helen's Church, Treeton =

Anglican church in Treeton, South Yorkshire, England

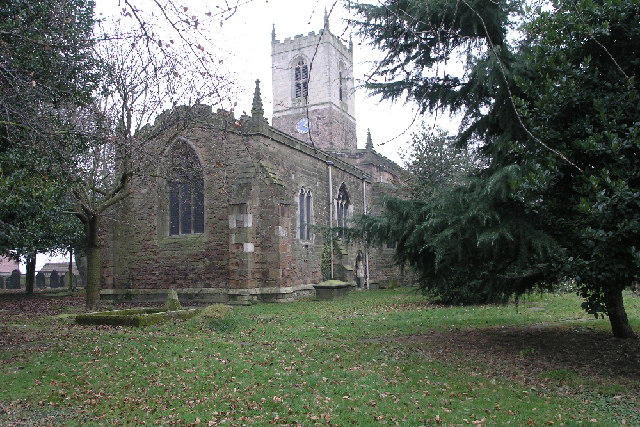
- St Helen's Church, Treeton
- 53.384501°N 1.351273°W
- OS grid reference: SK432877
- Location: Front Street, Treeton, South Yorkshire S60 5QP
- Country: England
- Denomination: Church of England
- Churchmanship: Evangelical

Administration
- Province: York
- Diocese: Sheffield
- Deanery: Rotherham Deanery
- Parish: Treeton

Clergy
- Vicar: Revd Judith Leverton

The Church of St Helen is the parish church in the village of Treeton in South Yorkshire, England. It is a Church of England church in the Diocese of Sheffield. The building is Grade I listed building and dates back to at least the 12th century AD. It is a prominent feature within the village, and can be seen from all directions.

== History ==
There was a church on this site at the time of the Domesday Book survey in 1086, one of only 15 in what would become the county of South Yorkshire The current building was originally constructed c. 1175 to c. 1200, after the previous church, in the Norman style, was demolished and re-built. Only the arches, which are clearly Norman, and a single child's coffin, remain from the original church. It was dedicated to Christian Saint Helen. The lower half of the square tower that remains today, was constructed in the 12th century, and of rubble walling. It is on the westernmost edge of the church. A 13th-century effigy of a medieval knight, the first in the area and commonly referred to as "Sir Gilbert", a reference to the Earl of Shrewsbury, is built into the western wall. Unfortunately, the shield of the knight is too worn for the identification of any coat of arms that could verify the historical accuracy of this belief. The building was remodelled in the late 13th and early 14th centuries, and restored in 1869 and 1892.

There were also several additions in the 15th century, including the present lead roofing, the southern porch, the south chapel, and the western part of the nave. Although the lower half of the tower was constructed in the 12th century, the upper half, which is made of a noticeably different stone and is surrounded on all sides by crenellations with a small upright spire in each corner, was also constructed in the 15th century and contains six bells, three of them not installed until 1892. A clock face can be seen on the eastern side of the tower. On 29 March 1968, it was listed as a Grade I building, and has remained so ever since.

== Notable rectors ==
- 1660-1664: Shorland Adams

== Theft ==
The church is still in use by the congregation of the village of Treeton. In 2008, police found three youths on the church roof, wearing masks, balaclavas and gloves, when over £100,000 worth of lead had already been stolen previously in 10 separate raids, but they were released without charge because they "might be there just for the view". No evidence was found that the youths were planning to steal the lead, even though some had been rolled up on the roof.
