= William Newton (poet) =

- Born: 1750; Abney, Derbyshire, England
- Died: 1830; Tideswell
- Education: Local dame school and apprenticeship
- Occupations: Poet and Mill owner
- Spouse: Helen Coo

William Newton (1750–1830), a labouring class poet often referred to as "the Peak Minstrel", was born near Abney, in the parish of Eyam, Derbyshire, England, on 28 November 1750. He was well regarded by other, more notable writers and made his fortune as owner of Cressbrook Mill, near Tideswell. He died on 3 November 1830.

== Biography ==
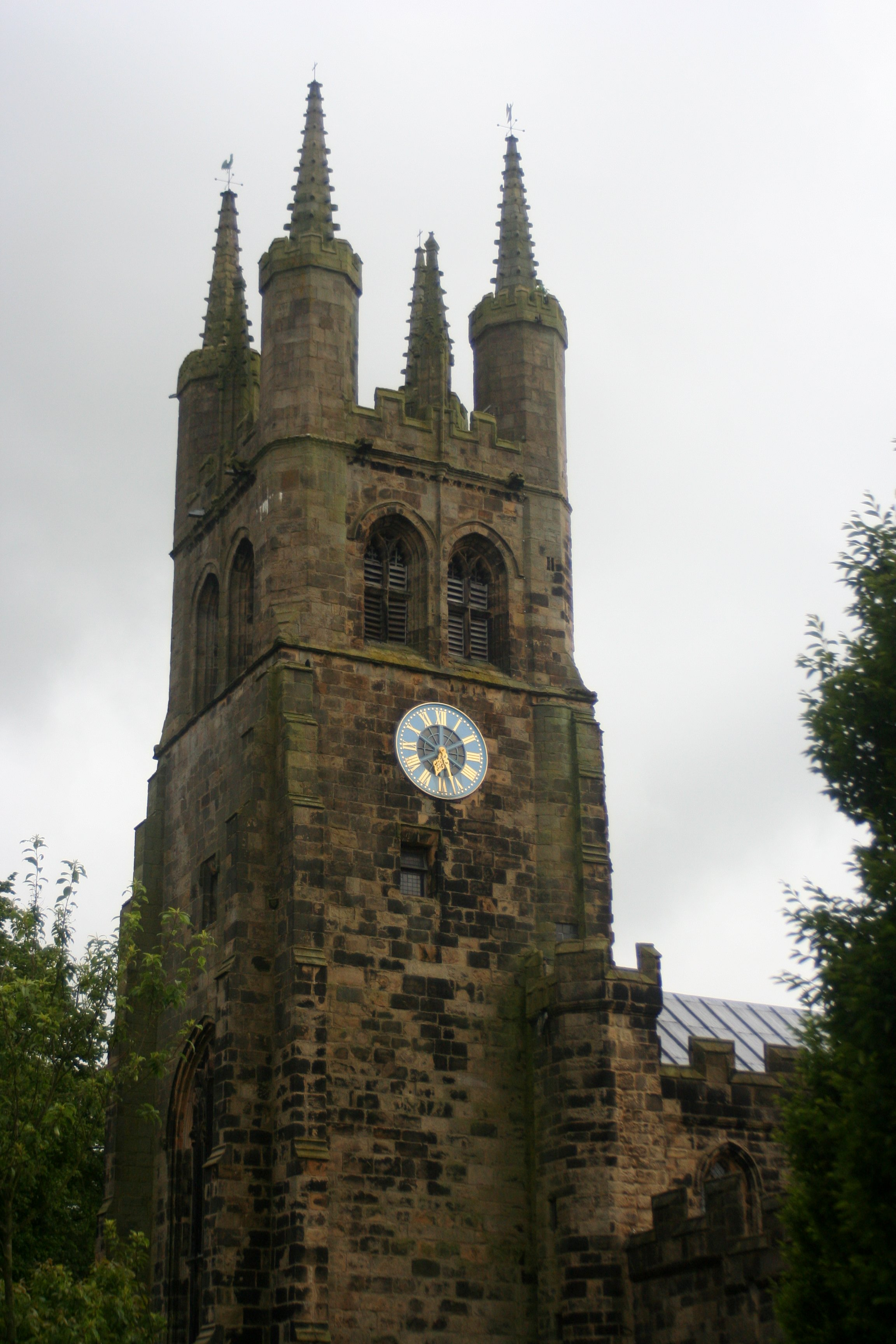
St John's Church in Tideswell, where Newton was buried

Newton was born at Cockey Farm near Abney. He attended a dame school and then followed his carpenter father constructing spinning-wheels, and he started a seven year apprenticeship to become a machinery carpenter at a mill in Monsal Dale. He spent his money on books. The poetic Reverend Peter Cunningham, who was curate at Eyam and encouraged Newton to write.

In the summer of 1783, Newton was introduced to Anna Seward, who also encouraged him in his writing and corresponded with him until her death. In her account of their meeting, Miss Seward expressed a high opinion of "the elegance and harmony" in Newton's writing. Her account appeared the following year under the title "The Minstrel of Woodlow" in The Gentleman's Magazine and at the start of 1785 in both The Scots Magazine, and under the editorship of James Boswell in the newly founded Edinburgh Magazine. Accompanying it was Newton's complimentary address to Cunningham in one of his own poems, and Seward's address to Newton, "Written in the blank leaves of her own poems, presented by her to William Newton":

Thou gentle bard, on whose internal sight
Genius has pour'd her many-coloured light…
And tho' proud Fame her sunny glance has shed
On the low roof that screen thy modest head,
The same exalted spirit scorns to wail
Her echoes silent in thy lonely vale.

Seward's poem is also an evocation of the wild moorland scarred by quarries and smoking lime kilns, among which he works unregarded like a second Chatterton.

Newton was soon to contribute to the industrialisation of the area himself, for he went on to become the agent of Richard Arkwright, often called "father of the industrial revolution", for his invention of the spinning frame at nearby Cressbrook Mill. He was dismissed by Arkwright in 1790 and Anna Seward came to his rescue with a loan that enabled him to invest in a new mill.

Later Newton personally rebuilt Cressbrook Mill, after its destruction by fire. Archives at Manchester Central Library contain evidence that he sought to provide better living conditions for his apprentices than were prevalent at many other mills, and he oversaw the construction of model cottages and a village school. Nonetheless, an apprenticeship even at Cressbrook Mill was far from ideal. There are accounts of Newton's violent treatment of the 300–400 indentured boys from orphanages and charity hospitals that he employed there. Any offence resulted in a beating from him with "hazel sticks across our bare buttocks and loins till he cut the flesh and made the blood flow".

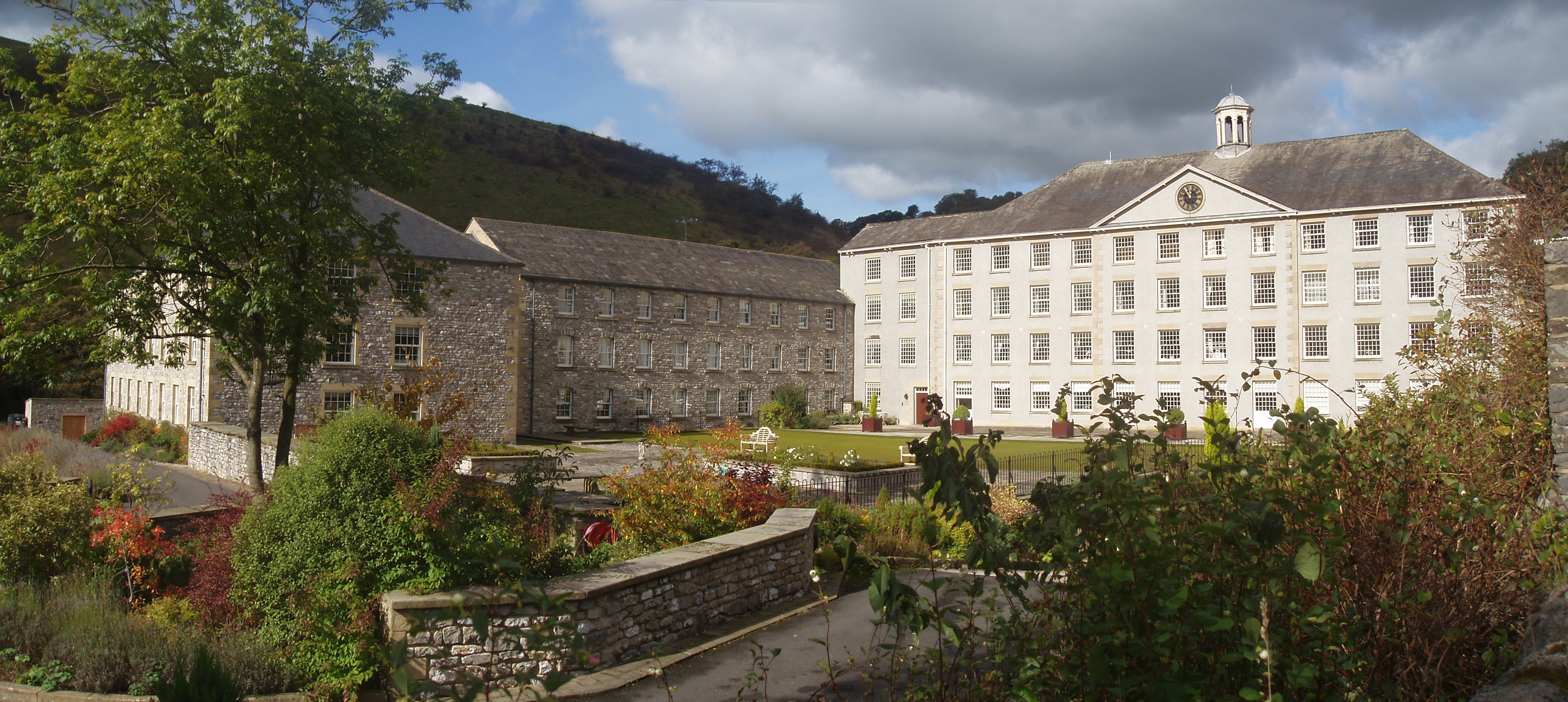
Cressbrook Mill, from which Newton made his fortune

Industrialisation of this remote area is mentioned in the writer John Holland's account of a visit he paid to Newton in 1823. The poet turned mill-owner "appeared venerable in years, with locks white and floating in the breeze; his poetical feeling was not extinct and some latent sparks of that enthusiasm remained." His reason for putting financial betterment before literature was explained in accounts by others by his early marriage and his several children by his wife Helen.

Newton died at his home in Tideswell on 3 November 1830, just short of his 80th birthday. He was buried in St John the Baptist's churchyard there. His wife died only eight days after her husband. His eldest son William (1785–1851) took over the mill and is said to have supplied the village with good water at his own expense.

== Poetry ==
Newton's friendship with Anna Seward gave him entry into a group who imitated the Della Cruscan school in writing each other complimentary verses under assumed names. They were also among those reviving the sonnet in the final decades of the 18th century, an example appearing in the Gentleman’s Magazine for January 1789. Clustered on the page are one of Seward's adaptations of Horace's odes, followed by Newton's sonnet in her praise and another of her sonnets in reply. In the following year, Newton published two more sonnets there of a despairing tone, occasioned by the death of a son, and it has been conjectured, the threat to his livelihood after falling out with Arkwright.

Another poetic exchange with Miss Seward concerns a poem describing the countryside about Eyam, which no longer exists. It is known only from her "Epistle to Mr. Newton, the Derbyshire Minstrel, on receiving his description in verse of an autumnal scene near Eyam, September 1791". Hers is a tearful acknowledgement of childhood memories brought back by the familiar landscape that he evokes. In fact little of Newton's poetry remains outside the files of old magazines and newspapers. He submitted his poems to the Sheffield Register (1787–94) and its successor the Sheffield Iris (1794–1816), where there appeared such verses as "Sonnet to a Mountain Cowslip", "Verses addressed to Mr. Home, written upon reading his tragedy of Douglas", and "Verses occasion'd by the tolling of a passing bell". Others may have appeared under the signature Edwin, the name he went by in the Seward circle. However, Newton never collected his verse for publication in a single edition.

Another poem was published in The Northern Star in 1818 and later privately printed by James Montgomery, editor of the Sheffield Iris. This "supposed soliloquy of a Father under the Gibbet of his son, upon one of the Peak Mountains" made a stir at the time. It has been credited with contributing to the end of the practice of gibbeting, although that did not occur until 1834. A final sonnet, hitherto unpublished, accompanied a late reminiscence of Newton. Dated October 1822, when he was nearing his 72nd birthday, the poem is a mellow piece that draws together an evening scene and anticipation of retirement.

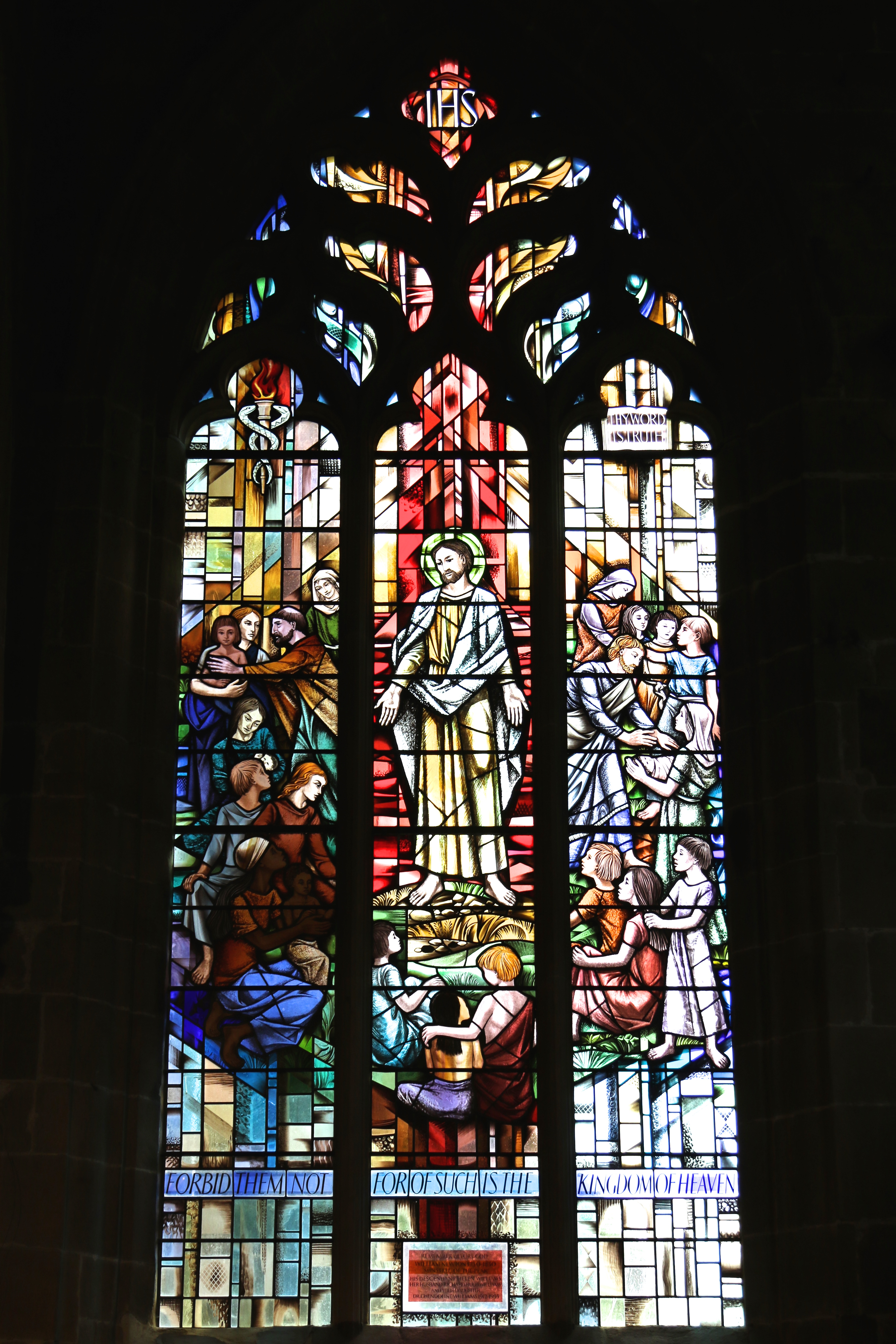
Memorial window to William Newton

Beneath my Alder's peaceful bough,
While whispers soft the Western wind,
My limbs I indolently throw,
And leave the world and care behind.
Here blest with peace, with ease and health,
Life’s toilsome scenes, O let me shun!
Forego ambition, fame and wealth,
To bask me in the evening sun.
And as this gentle bosom'd stream
With silent lapse serenely flows,
Smiles and reflects the golden beam,
Ere modest evening's glories close;
So let me, in life's tranquil evening, find
Calm, soft, unruffl'd joys – the sunshine of the mind!

== Heritage ==
Francis Chantrey initially mistook Newton for a peasant when he met him by chance. As a result the sculptor made a pencil sketch of the poet, which he left with him, as the only life portrait of Newton known to exist. An engraving based on it was reproduced in the Reliquary Quarterly for 1860.

In 1996 a memorial window to Newton was installed in St John the Baptist, Tideswell. Representing Jesus welcoming little children, it remembers the Chantrey's apprenticeship scheme and his descendants in the Williams family, whose daughter Gwendoline died in 1993.

== See also ==
- List of 18th-century British working-class writers
