= Jumber Brook =

Coordinates: 53°17′21″N 1°40′46″W

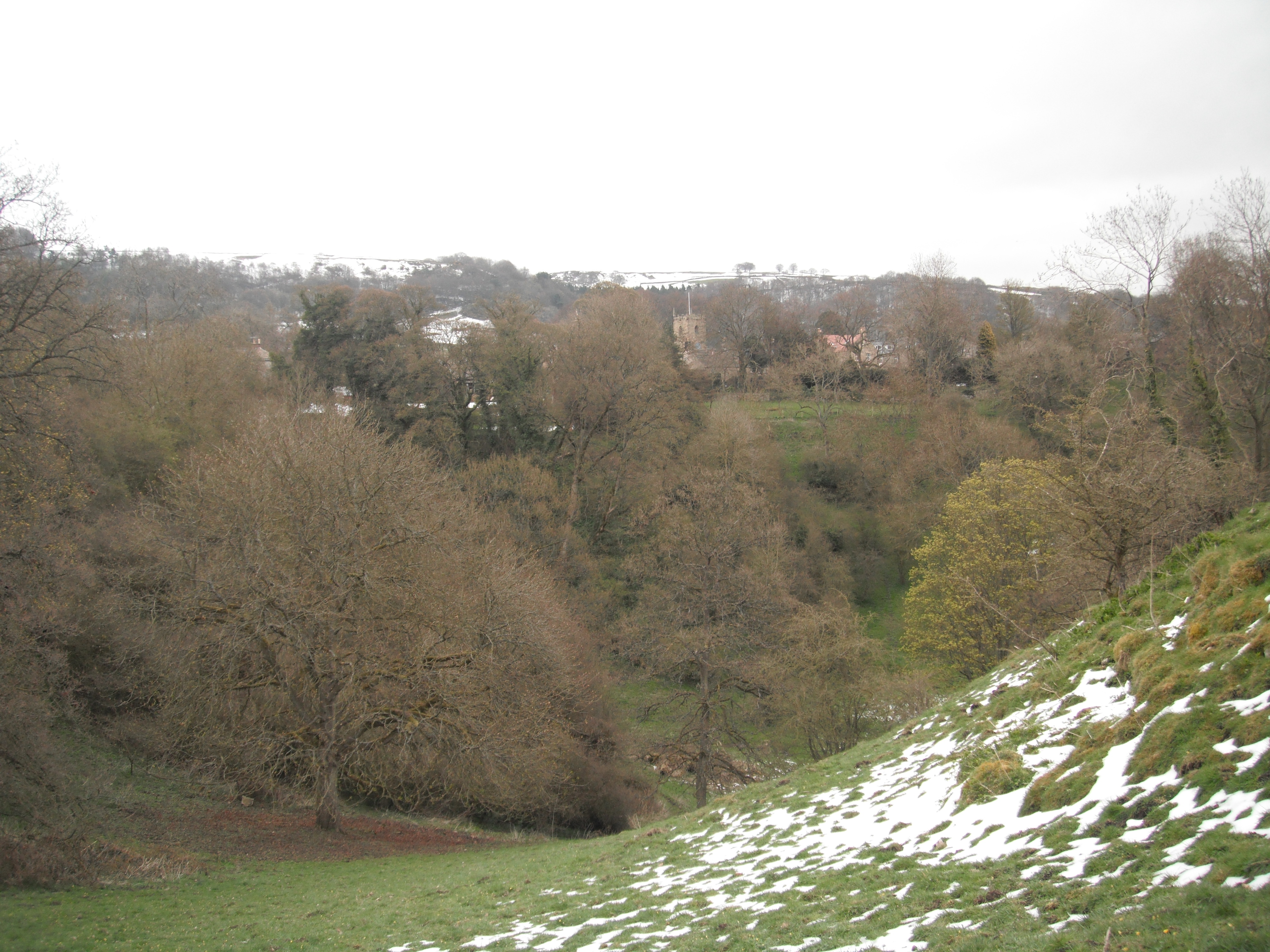
- The Brook flows through The Delf, south of Eyam

Location
- Country: England

Physical characteristics
- Source
  - location: Highcliffe
- Mouth
  - location: Dale Brook

Jumber Brook is a stream in Eyam in the Derbyshire Peak District. The stream originates to the north of the village at Highcliffe. The brook flows south through the middle of the village before meeting the Dale Brook in Middleton Dale near Stoney Middleton.

== See also ==
- List of rivers of England
