= The Roses of Eyam =

Historical drama by Don Taylor

The Roses of Eyam is a historical drama by Don Taylor about the Great Plague that swept Britain in 1665/66. It is largely based on the events that happened in the "plague village" of Eyam in Derbyshire, between September 1665 and December 1666. Published in 1970, The Roses of Eyam had its world premiere at The Northcott Theatre in Exeter, Devon, on 23 September 1970.

== Description ==
The script requires a large cast, with a core of actors prepared to learn extensive parts and portray passionate and sustained emotion. The play best suits an atmospheric setting such as a Norman church or Restoration Manor House, where it can be performed in the round. Taylor himself filmed the story for television in 1973.

The Roses of Eyam was originally intended for an adult audience but has become part of children's theatre. The play is now also a set text in many British schools for students of English Literature and Drama.

== TV production ==
A television production of The Roses of Eyam was broadcast on BBC2 on 12 June 1973 and produced at the BBC's Pebble Mill Studios. Don Taylor himself adapted the stage play for television and he directed it.

== Outline ==
It begins as educated Anglican clergyman the Reverend William Mompesson receives the living from his benefactors, the Saville family. A 'King's Man', he is replacing the previous Puritan incumbent, Thomas Stanley, who has refused to comply with the 1662 Act of Uniformity which makes use of the Anglican Book of Common Prayer compulsory.

The early part of the play establishes that the village is still divided between Royalist and Roundhead sympathisers. Meanwhile, local tailor George Vicars takes delivery of a large consignment of cloth from London. Within days the village is stricken by plague.

Families shut themselves away in their homes fearing that contact with others will invite the infection. With the onset of cold weather in autumn the number of cases falls but rises again when the warm weather comes in spring. An exodus of the village begins but Mompesson and Stanley put aside their differences to persuade the villagers to stay put until the plague is over. The villagers are reminded that if they leave they will be welcome nowhere and will die as outcasts and vagrants, taking many other innocents with them. The villagers voluntarily decide to isolate themselves. Food is left for them by the county High Sheriff at stones marking the limits of the quarantine. As the play evolves the audience moves from location to location and the action intensifies as the village empties.

Some villagers build shacks in the hills, or live in caves, to be away from the infection. The deaths continue through the summer with hardly anyone left to bury the dead. Grass grows in the village streets. Both rectors have doubts at their actions but eventually the dying ceases and the survivors learn they have been successful with no other cases of plague occurring in the county.

Some humour is included by the mad orphan boy Bedlam who sings and dances through the worst times and the two cantankerous old yokels Unwin and Merril.

In some productions each corpse reappears in ghostly white make-up until the audience is surrounded by keening wraiths.
