= Middleton Dale =

Valley in the Derbyshire Peak District

- Stoney Middleton Dale
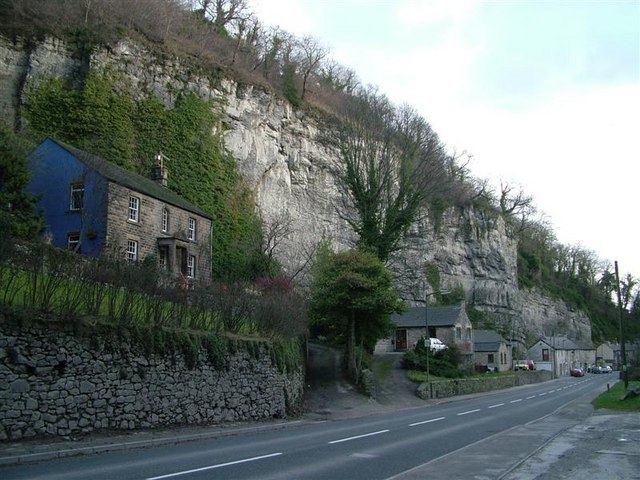
- Crags by A623 in Middleton Dale
- Length: 1.9 miles (3 km) West-East
- Width: 250 metres (820 ft)
- Depth: 60 metres (197 ft)

Geography
- Location: Derbyshire, England
- Coordinates: 53.2805°N 1.6998°W
- Rivers: Dale Brook
- Interactive map of Middleton Dale

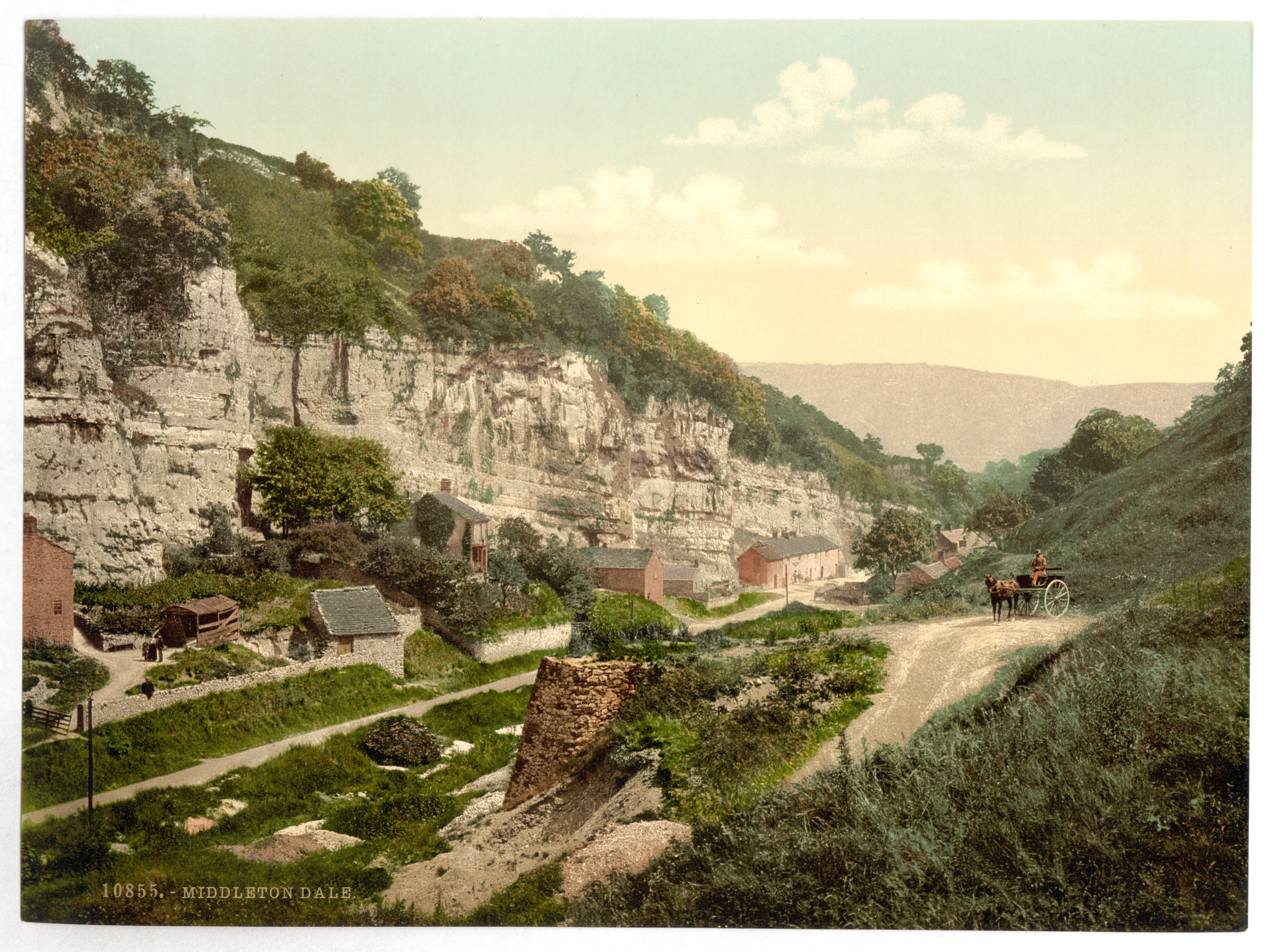
Middleton Dale in c.1900

Middleton Dale is a steep-sided, carboniferous limestone valley in the Derbyshire Peak District of England. The village of Stoney Middleton lies at the eastern foot of the dale and the village of Eyam lies about 600 metres (660 yd) to the north, through the side valley of Eyam Dale. The dale is cut into the surrounding gritstone uplands of Middleton Moor and Eyam Moor. Dale Brook stream runs down the dale into Stoke Brook and on into the River Derwent 1.5 kilometres (1 mi) beyond Stoney Middleton. The Delf is a secluded, wooded side gorge with a stream between Eyam and Middleton Dale. Opposite The Delf, water gushes from Hawkenedge Well and flows into Dale Brook.

The northern side of the valley has an extensive system of caves and sink holes (swallets), although most are narrow and muddy. There are about 70 entrances and more than 3 kilometres (1.9 mi) of cave passages at various levels. The caves have been explored for generations and are often connected to old lead mineshafts. The largest cave system was recorded in 1734 in Dr Short's book History of the Mineral Waters. He wrote how Carlswark Cavern passed right through the mountain and out into Eyam Dale. Inside it there is a large chamber called Oyster Chamber, referring to the abundance of fossilised shells. Merlin Cavern has 1 kilometre (0.62 mi) of passages from old lead mine workings. Fingals Cave is a tall passage with the largest entrance in the dale and is an old mine. Ivy Green Cave is 225 metres (738 ft) long and in 1989 a local boy from Eyam got lost in it and his body was only found a year later.

Limestone has been quarried in Middleton Dale for hundreds of years, from Darlton Quarry, Furness Quarry (now known as Horseshoe Quarry) and Goddards Quarry. The fossil-rich limestone was formed from deposits in a warm shallow sea in the Brigantian stage of the Carboniferous period (around 330 million years ago).

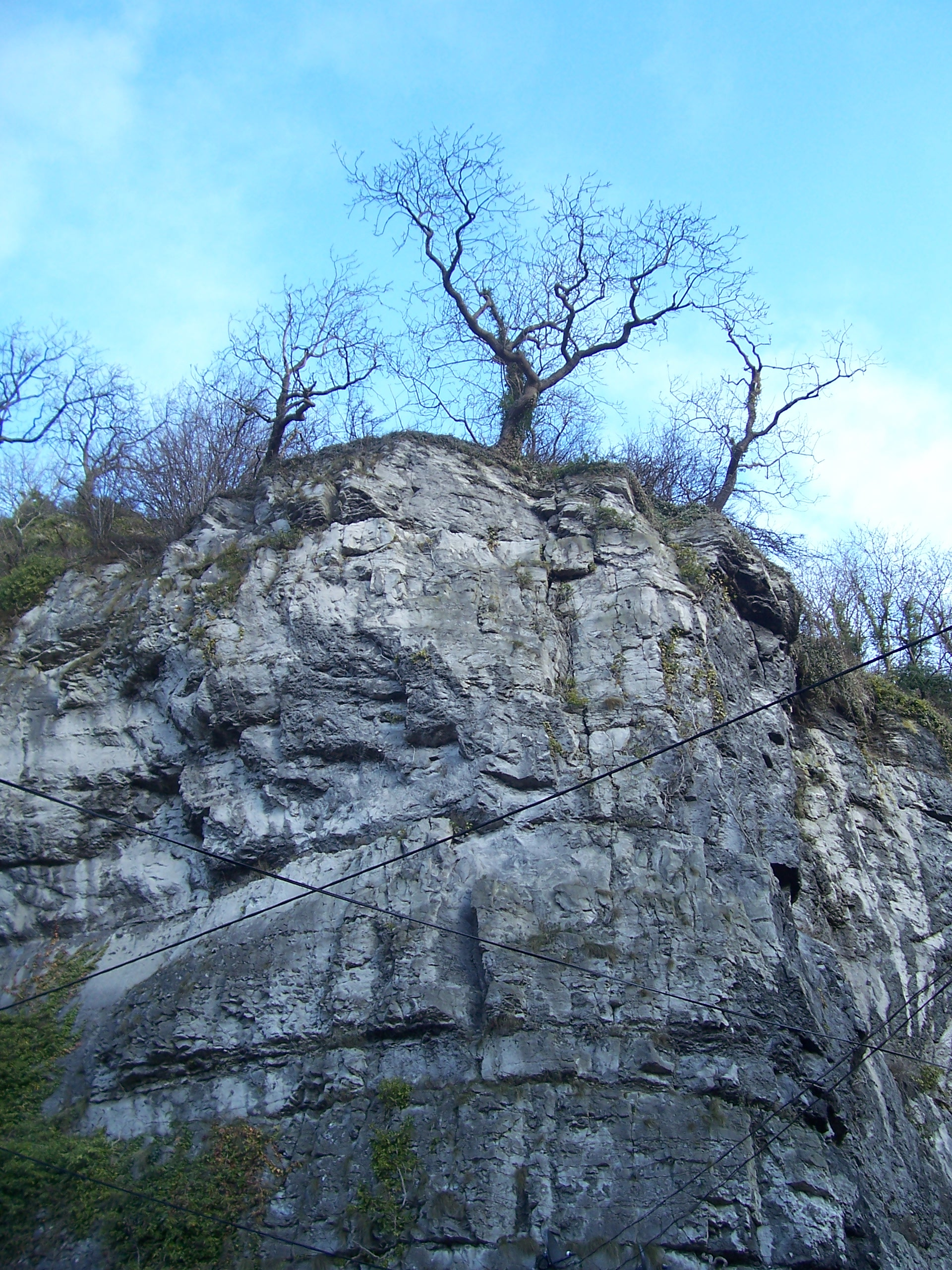
Lovers Leap in Middleton Dale

Middleton Dale has extensive rock climbing, with over 450 graded routes across a series of large buttresses up to 50 metres (160 ft) high. The climbing includes nationally renowned routes such as Alcasan and Our Father. It is a popular location for bouldering.

Lovers Leap is a cliff near the foot of the valley, where in 1762 a jilted young lover called Hannah Baddeley threw herself down but survived the fall. The legend is that her long skirt acted like a parachute and then caught in the bushes by a ledge to halt her fall. Whilst she escaped any major injury, she died two years later still a spinster. The old stone pub building at the bottom of the cliff is known as Lovers Leap and is now a restaurant.

Stoney Middleton Dale is a designated Site of Special Scientific Interest (SSSI), formerly registered as Shining Cliff SSSI. Ancient woodland of ash trees, wych elm and hazel grows on the lower valley slopes. The trees of the higher limestone crags include rock whitebeam, yew and field maple. The limestone cliffs support a variety of uncommon native grasses. Varied shrubs and wild flowers include dogwood, buckthorn, common rock-rose, dog rose, cowslip, moschatel, wood avens, bluebell, early dog-violet, ramson, golden saxifrage and mossy saxifrage.

The A623 road runs along the length of the valley, on an 18th-century turnpike route.

There are footpaths into the dale from Eyam but there are no footpaths along the dale, as the road occupies the route.
