= Ebenezer Rhodes =

English topographer and artist (1762–1839)

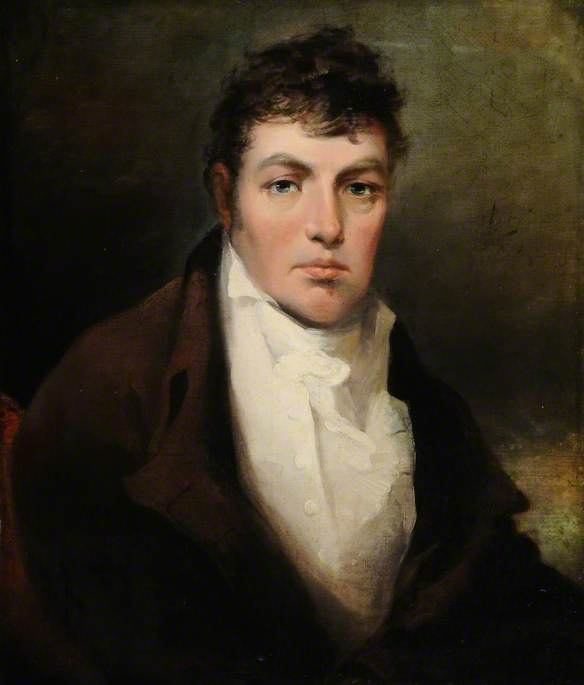
- by Chantry
- Born: 1762 near Rotherham
- Died: 16 December 1839; Sheffield
- Education: Apprenticeship
- Occupation(s): Cutler and topographer
- Spouse: Miss Hill of Sheffield
- Children: seven (two died as children)
- Parent: John Rhodes (an iron worker)

Ebenezer Rhodes (1762–1839) was an English topographer, publisher, master cutler and artist. He became a prominent historian of Derbyshire.

== Life ==
Born in Masborough near Rotherham, in 1762, Rhodes served a seven-year apprenticeship in the cutlery trade from 1777, despite a strong interest in reading and the theatre. He became a senior partner in David Champion, a firm making scissors, to which razors were added later.

Rhodes was elected in 1808 head of Company of Cutlers in Hallamshire and became a master cutler. In August, the members gave their president a gold cup to acknowledge his public services in establishing the Institution.

Rhodes started to become associated with debating societies, one being called The Society of the Friends of Literature, which met in a public house in Sheffield. Rhodes became a conspicuous speaker and Jacobin politician. The groups also included the Rev. John Pye Smith, a theological writer, and James Montgomery, a Christian poet and philanthropist. The groups were eventually suspected of sedition and proscribed.

== Peak scenery ==
Rhodes made many excursions with James Montgomery, to Monsal Dale, Millers Dale and other parts of Derbyshire. He spent days sketching in Dovedale with his fellow artist Thomas Christopher Hofland.

In 1818 Rhodes published the first part of a folio edition of his Peak Scenery, or the Derbyshire Tourist, dedicated to the Duke of Devonshire and illustrated by F.L.Chantrey. This was followed by the first part of Yorkshire Scenery, although other parts were never published. In 1837 Rhodes issued a small Derbyshire Tourist's Guide and Travelling Companion. All his books involved him in financial loss, but his Peak Scenery remains a standard work. Apart from these ventures, he turned his attention to journalism, and for several years edited the Sheffield Independent.

== Bankruptcy ==
Meanwhile his business failed and he became a bankrupt. A fund was raised for his support, to which Montgomery subscribed £100, while Chantrey privately gave Rhodes £50 a year. Thereafter he still made a small income preparing steel plates for engravers by a novel process. He died a poor man, on 16 December 1839, at his home in Victoria Street, Sheffield.

== Publications ==
- Essay on the Manufacture, Choice and Management of a Razor, by E Rhodes Cutler, Sheffield, 1809
- Peak Scenery, or the Derbyshire Tourist, dedicated to the Duke of Devonshire and illustrated by F.L.Chantrey, 1824
- Yorkshire Scenery, Part 1, London, 1826
- Derbyshire Tourist's Guide and Travelling Companion, 1837
- The Poets of Yorkshire (Rhodes was included), by William Cartwright Newsam, 1845
