= William Mompesson =

English clergyman

William Mompesson (1639 – 7 March 1709) was a Church of England priest whose decisive action when his Derbyshire parish, Eyam, became infected with the plague in the 17th century averted more widespread catastrophe.

The earliest reference to him is in Alumni Cantabrigienses; he was baptized at Collingham, West Yorkshire on 28 April 1639, attended school in Sherburn and went to Peterhouse, Cambridge University, in 1655, graduating BA 1659 and MA 1662. He was ordained in 1660. After a period of service as chaplain to Sir George Saville, later (1679) Lord Halifax, he came as Rector to Eyam in 1664, with his wife Catherine (daughter of Ralph Carr, Esq., of Cocken, County Durham).

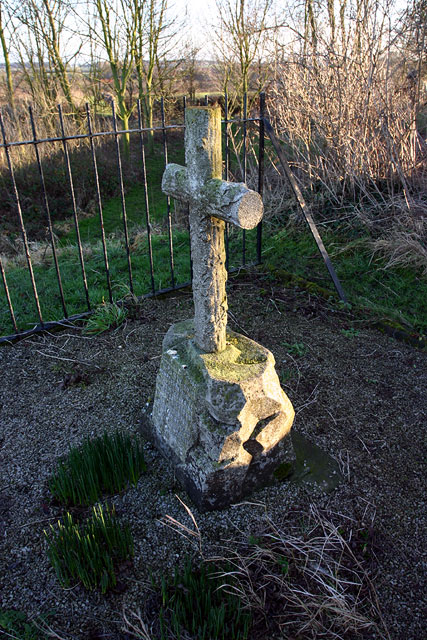
Mompesson's Memorial at Eakring

In 1665 plague hit England, and a consignment of cloth bound for his village brought with it the infectious fleas that spread the disease. After an initial flurry of deaths in the autumn of that year the plague diminished during the winter only to come back even more virulently in the spring of 1666. Mompesson, in conjunction with another clergyman, the ejected Puritan Thomas Stanley, took the courageous decision to isolate the village. In all, 260 of the village's inhabitants, including Mompesson's wife Catherine, died before the plague claimed its last victim in December 1666. Mompesson became associated with the plague and was not universally welcomed at his next parish, Eakring, Nottinghamshire. In 1670 he remarried, his second wife being a widow, Elizabeth Newby. She was a relative of Mompesson's patron, Sir George Saville, and through Saville's patronage Mompesson eventually became Prebendary of Southwell, Nottinghamshire, although he declined the opportunity to be Dean of Lincoln Cathedral. He died in 1709.

This historic episode, commemorated each year in Eyam, has been the subject of many books and plays, notably The Roses of Eyam by Don Taylor (1970). Recently academics have begun to question the key details of the story: for example the extent to which wealthier residents were able to circumvent the ban. For example, despite insisting all villagers should remain in Eyam, Mompesson had his own children sent away to Sheffield in June 1666, just before the quarantine was agreed. At this time he also wanted to send his wife Catherine with them but she refused to leave him, later succumbing to the plague.

Mompesson did many things to help the village during the plague including preventing its spread by filling pockets drilled in the Boundary Stone full of vinegar for trading. This helped stop the spread of the plague by sterilising any coins that came in or out of Eyam. "Mompesson's Well", listed at Grade II by Historic England, is a substantial well on the edge of the village and another site for the exchange of payment for food and other essentials left by neighbouring parishioners.

== See also ==
- St Lawrence's Church, Eyam
- Cucklet Church
- Mompesson's Well
