= Samuel Roberts (Sheffield writer) =

English writer on social issues

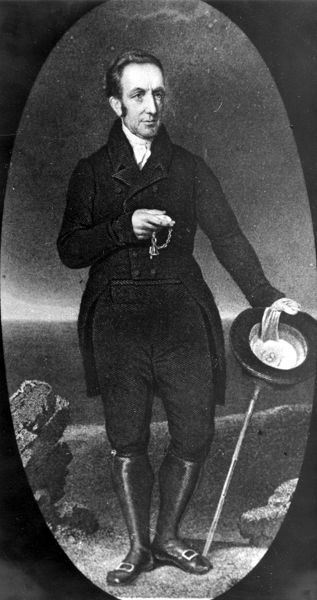
An engraving of Samuel Roberts' portrait, used as the frontispiece to his books

Samuel Roberts, a Sheffield cutler, author and supporter of benevolent causes, was born in the city on 18 April 1763. He died there at the age of 85 on 24 July 1848 and was buried in Anston churchyard.

== Life ==
Samuel Roberts was the second son of the similarly named Sheffield manufacturer and merchant, Samuel Roberts (1732–1799), by his wife Mary Sykes. At the age of fourteen he entered his father's business of silver and plated goods, remaining there until 1784, when he established a firm of his own with fellow apprentice George Cadman (1760–1823). The business prospered and by 1841 had a London showroom at Duke Street, Adelphi. Regarded as one of the ablest manufacturers in Sheffield, Roberts also registered a string of patents for his various innovations.

As a successful and prosperous businessman, he was made an Overseer of the Poor in 1804, a position he shared with James Montgomery, to whose newspaper The Sheffield Iris he now began to contribute. Soon after this, the two started to cooperate in philanthropic schemes. Their first project was forming an association for the abolition of the use of climbing boys in sweeping chimneys, which shortly became a national campaign. In support of this Roberts wrote "The Song of the Poor Little Sweep", composed in a quantitative metre but otherwise resembling William Blake's earlier treatments of the theme in his Songs of Innocence and of Experience.

From then on, "by a rigid economy of time, he found innumerable opportunities for the exercise of his pen on a great variety of subjects" in both verse and prose. On account of his books, pamphlets, broadsheets, and contributions to the press in support of the socially disenfranchised, Roberts became known as "The Paupers’ Advocate". Among the many other benevolent causes he championed, along with Montgomery, was the abolition of slavery and opposition to war, to capital punishment and, particularly in his final years, to the 1834 Poor Law Amendment Act. In at least one case the two shared in attacking the lottery, where Montgomery added his poem "Thoughts on Wheels" to Roberts' The State Lottery: A Dream (1817). Often, too, Roberts' pamphlets with a purely local appeal were printed from the press of Montgomery's newspaper.

Having married Elizabeth Wright, of Anston, on 22 October 1794, Roberts parented a son (also called Samuel) who followed him into his business. Of his three daughters, the second was Mary Roberts, who became an author in her own right with the long poem The Royal Exile (1822). To this her father contributed a sympathetic biography of its subject, Mary, Queen of Scots. His portrait by local artist William Poole (1799–1888), shows him standing with his cane, hat and gloves in one hand and his watch in the other. An engraving of this appeared as a frontispiece to some of his books.

== Books by Roberts ==
- Tales of the Poor, or Infant Sufferings (1813); 2nd series (London, 1829), poetry and fiction dealing with the young
- The Blind Man and his Son and other short fictions (London, 1816)
- The State Lottery, a Dream (London, 1817), with James Montgomery
- Chimney Sweepers' Boys: The Resolutions and Petition to Parliament of the Inhabitants of Sheffield (Sheffield, 1817)
- A Defence of the Poor Laws (Sheffield 1819)
- A Letter to John Bull, to which is added the sketch of a plan for the safe, speedy and effectual abolition of slavery (London 1823), the opening of Roberts' campaign against slavery
- Tom and Charles, or the Two Grinders (1823); included in Yorkshire Tales
- The World of Children, or The Life & Adventures of Arthur Fitzaimer, Esq (1829); included in Yorkshire Tales
- Parallel Miracles, or the Jews and the Gypsies (London, 1830)
- Tocsin the third: Signs of the times, Addressed to British Legislators (Sheffield 1831), comments on the slavery debate
- Eyam: its Trials and its Triumphs (Sheffield, 1834)
- England's Passing Bell, or the obsequies of national holiness, liberty, and honour (Sheffield 1834), on the rights of the poor
- Thoughts on War, addressed to people of all classes (Sheffield, 1834), an 11-page pamphlet supporting the formation of the Auxiliary Peace Society
- The Gypsies, their Origin, Continuance, and Destination (London, 1836); 5th edition enlarged, 1842
- England's Glory, or The Good Old Poor Laws: addressed to the working classes of Sheffield (Sheffield, 1836)
- A Cry from the Chimneys, or An Integral Part of the Total Abolition of Slavery throughout the World (London 1837), a plea for the abolition of the employment of chimney-sweepers' climbing boys
- Queen's Coronation: An Address to the Females of Sheffield on the Wickedness, the Barbarity, and the Impolicy of the Punishment of Death in All Classes (Sheffield 1838), short pamphlet included next year in the dedication of Yorkshire Tales
- Yorkshire Tales & Poems (London 1839)
- The Wickedness of the New Poor Law, Addressed to Serious Christians of All Denominations, with an Appeal to the Clergy (Sheffield, 1839), 10-page pamphlet
- Mary Wilden, a victim to the New Poor Law; or the Malthusian and Marcusian system exposed (London, 1839)
- The Sheffield & Nottingham Tragedies, or The Evils of Capital Punishment (1844), a 15-page pamphlet
- Milton Unmasked (London 1844), an indictment of his poetry as blasphemous
- Memoirs of Elizabeth Creswick Roberts, Addressed to the Aged Female Society (London, 1845), recording the death of his grandchild and a donation in her memory
- Truth, or the Fall of Babylon the Great, Being an Address to the Ratepayers of this Kingdom, and Particularly to Those of Sheffield on the Greatest Curse that Ever was Inflicted on Any Nation, the Poor Law Amendment Act (Sheffield, 1845)
- Lessons for Statesmen: with anecdotes respecting them, calculated to preserve the aristocracy from destruction and the country from ruin (London, 1846), a comment on the Corn Law debates
- The Oppression of the Poor, the Destruction of Nations: Addressed to All Classes in Sheffield (Sheffield, 1848), a 12-page pamphlet on almshouses
- The Jews, the English Poor, and the Gypsies, with a Proposal for an Important Improvement to the British Constitution (London, 1848), relative to the proposal to allow Jews to stand for parliament

The volume published in the year following Roberts' death and purporting to be his autobiography in reality only contains an autobiographical fragment covering the years up to 1800, before he became a public figure. The greater part is taken up with an anonymous commentary on copious extracts from his writing. It was followed in 1862 by Some Memorials of the Family of Roberts by his son, Samuel. Largely directed to family members, the memoir follows the family line from the first records in Ecclesfield towards the end of the 17th century through to the book's date of publication. Included there is a more succinct biography of his father.
