= St Lawrence's Church, Eyam =

St Lawrence’s Church, Eyam
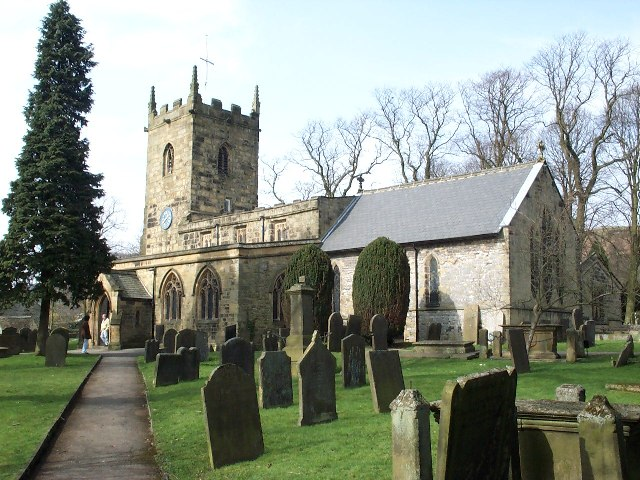
- St Lawrence’s Church, Eyam
- St Lawrence’s Church, Eyam
- 53°17′6.14″N 1°40′44.31″W
- Location: Eyam
- Country: England
- Denomination: Church of England
- Website: achurchnearyou.com/church/13176/; www.eyamchurch.org

History
- Dedication: St Lawrence

Architecture
- Heritage designation: Grade II* listed

Administration
- Province: Canterbury
- Diocese: Derby
- Archdeaconry: Chesterfield
- Deanery: Peak
- Parish: Eyam

St Lawrence’s Church, Eyam is a Grade II* listed parish church in the Church of England in Eyam, Derbyshire.

== History ==
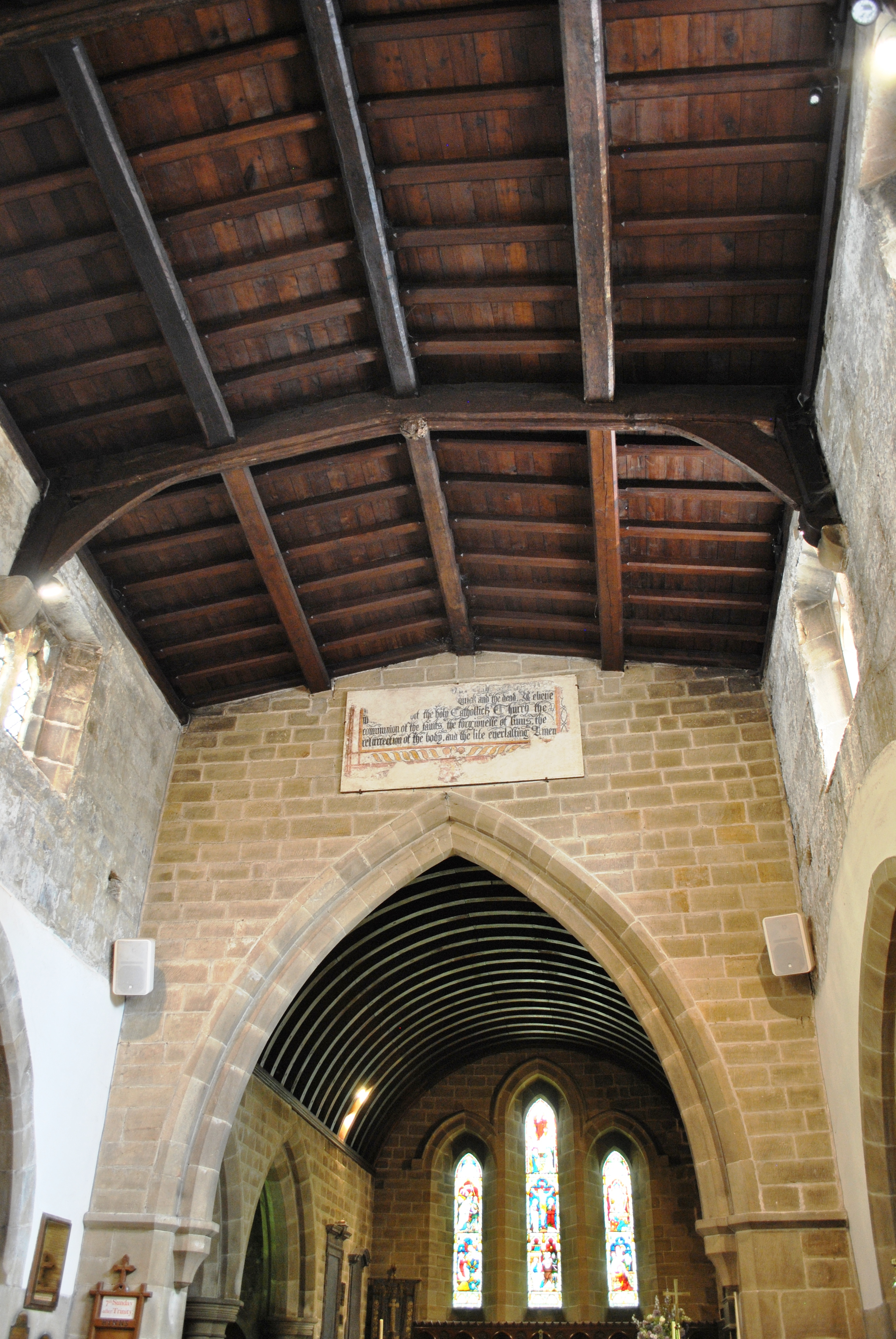
St Lawrence's Church, Eyam

The church is medieval with elements from the 13th and 15th centuries. It was partially rebuilt in 1619. The church was restored in 1868–70 by George Edmund Street with the work started by Malland and Son of Bamford at a cost of £1,337 (equivalent to £137,596 in 2025) for rebuilding the chancel and installing a new window. However, the work was much more involved than first estimated, as the chancel work uncovered the poor condition of the rest of the church and an additional £1,200 (equivalent to £123,497 in 2025) was needed. The contractor was changed to Dennett and Co of Nottingham, and the north aisle was rebuilt with five windows, and an additional aisle was added to the north side of the chancel. The galleries were removed, and the roof was re-leaded.

The south aisle and porch were rebuilt between 1882 and 1883 by Walker of Sheffield with the contractor being Hibbert of Baslow.

== Parish status ==
The church is in a joint parish with:

- St Anne’s Church, Baslow
- St Hugh’s Church, Foolow

== Organ ==
The church contains a pipe organ by Brindley and Foster dating from 1879. A specification of the organ can be found on the National Pipe Organ Register.

== Notable rectors ==
- 1630 and 1660 Shorland Adams
- 1644: Thomas Stanley
- 1664: William Mompesson

== See also ==
- Grade II* listed buildings in Derbyshire Dales
- Listed buildings in Eyam
