= List of museums in Derbyshire =

This list of museums in Derbyshire, England contains museums which are defined for this context as institutions (including nonprofit organizations, government entities, and private businesses) that collect and care for objects of cultural, artistic, scientific, or historical interest and make their collections or related exhibits available for public viewing. Also included are non-profit art galleries and university art galleries. Museums that exist only in cyberspace (i.e., virtual museums) are not included.

== Museums ==
Name	Image	Town/City	Type	Summary
80s Video Shop		Alfreton	Living History	website collection of 80s VHS tapes, movie posters, arcade machines and a screening room, housed in a period store
Bakewell Old House Museum		Bakewell	Multiple	website, historic Tudor house with period rooms, Victorian mill workers dwelling, textiles, toys
Barrow Hill Roundhouse		Barrow Hill	Railway	Preserved roundhouse and locomotives
Belper Heritage Centre		Belper	Local	information, local history, also known as St. John's Chapel Heritage Centre
Bolsover Castle		Bolsover	Historic house	Operated by English Heritage
Buxton Museum and Art Gallery		Buxton	Multiple	Local history, archaeology, fossils and minerals, natural history, art. Free admission. Operated by Derbyshire County Council. The Wonders of the Peak gallery includes local relics from the Bronze Age, Stone Age and Roman times. Located in the old Peak Hydropathic Hotel building since 1928.
Calke Abbey		Ticknall	Historic house	Operated by the National Trust, Baroque country house and garden
Carnfield Hall		South Normanton	Historic house	Country house and park, open by appointment on guided tours
Chatsworth House		Chatsworth	Historic house	Seat of the Dukes of Devonshire, features priceless paintings, furniture, Old Master drawings, neoclassical sculpture, books and other artefacts, gardens
Chesterfield Museum and Art Gallery		Chesterfield	Multiple	Free admission. Operated by Chesterfield Borough Council. Exhibitions cover the story of Chesterfield from Roman times, the Middle Ages and the Industrial Revolution.
Creswell Crags Museum		Creswell	Natural history	Collection of Ice Age and Stone Age artefacts, including prehistoric objects found in the caves and gorge of Creswell Crags. Admission charge.
Cromford Mill		Cromford	Industry	Exhibition of cotton spinning mill machinery and buildings. Located in Richard Arkwright's water-powered cotton mill complex, built in 1771, which are part of the Derwent Valley Mills World Heritage Site. Admission charge.
David Mellor Visitor Centre		Hathersage	Art	website, museum of cutlery designs of David Mellor, factory and store
Denby Pottery Visitor's Centre		Denby	Art	website, small museum of china and porcelain decorative art of the Denby Pottery Company, shop and factory tours
Derby Computer Museum		Derby	Computer Museum	website. A registered charity computer museum run by volunteers which specialises in providing a hands on experience
Derby Gaol		Derby	Prison	18th century prison
Derby Museum and Art Gallery		Derby	Multiple	Fine art, porcelains, local history, archaeology, natural history, geology and military collections. Operated by Derby Museums charity. Exhibits include large collections of Joseph Wright paintings and Royal Crown Derby porcelain. Established in 1879.
Derby Silk Mill (Museum of Making)		Derby	Industry	Local industries, railway, STEM exhibits. Operated by Derby Museums charity. Opened in 1974 and previously called Derby Industrial Museum. Located in Lombe's Silk Mill.
Derbyshire Police Museum		Derby		Exhibition of the history of Derbyshire Constabulary.
Erewash Museum		Ilkeston	Local	Local history, industry, period rooms and art exhibits tell the story of Erewash including Victorian life and Stanton Ironworks. Located in the Georgian mansion Dalby House. Operated by Erewash Borough Council.
Eyam Hall		Eyam	Historic house	Jacobean manor house with costumes, needlework, family portraits, gardens
Eyam Museum		Eyam	Local	Local history, impact of the Bubonic Plague in 1665. Located in the old Methodist chapel, opened in 1994 and operated by a local charity. Admission charge.
Haddon Hall		Bakewell	Historic house	Medieval manor house and gardens
Hardwick Hall		Doe Lea	Historic house	Operated by the National Trust, significant Elizabethan country house, collection of embroideries, gardens, grounds include Stainsby Mill
Heage Windmill		Heage	Mill	website, working windmill built in 1797
High Peak Junction		Cromford	Railway	Workshops for the former Cromford and High Peak Railway, near the Cromford Canal, part of the Derwent Valley Mills
Hope House Costume Museum		Alstonefield	Fashion	website, costumes and accessories from 1790 to the 1970s
Kedleston Hall		Kedleston	Historic house	Operated by the National Trust, 18th century Neoclassical country house, extensive collection of paintings, sculpture and original furnishings, museum of art and items from Asia
Leawood Pump House		High Peak Junction	Technology	Part of the Derwent Valley Mills, canal pump house with preserved steam engine
Little Chester Heritage Centre		Little Chester	Local	website, local history, located in St Paul's Church
Masson Mills Working Textile Museum		Matlock Bath	Industry	Exhibitions of cotton mill machinery and textiles. Located in Richard Arkwright's Masson Mills, built in 1783, which is part of the Derwent Valley Mills World Heritage Site. Admission charge.
Melbourne Hall		Melbourne	Historic house	Country house and gardens
Middleton Top Engine House		Middleton-by-Wirksworth	Steam	website, website, preserved beam engine
Midland Railway – Butterley		Butterley	Railway	Formerly known as Midland Railway Centre, heritage railway and museum. Operated by the Midland Railway Trust. Admission charge with steam train rides.
Moorland Centre		Edale	Natural history	website, geology, wildlife, plants and importance of the moorland and Peak District, operated by the Moors for the Future partnership
National Stone Centre		Middleton-by-Wirksworth	Geology	website, geology, earth science, mining, uses for rocks and minerals, site of former limestone quarries, outdoor fossil trail.
National Tramway Museum		Crich	Railway	Restored period village, home to the National Tramway Museum. Admission charge including tram ride. Collection includes over 80 trams dating from 1873 to 1982.
National Trust Museum of Childhood		Sudbury	Toy	Operated by the National Trust, located at Sudbury Hall. Historical collection of toys, games and dolls. Admission charge.
New Mills Heritage and Information Centre		New Mills	Local	website, local history
Old Manor		Norbury	Historic house	Operated by the National Trust, medieval hall
Peak District Lead Mining Museum		Matlock Bath	Mining	Lead mining, miner family life. Exhibits include a mockup of a lead mine. The museum is located inside the Grand Pavilion. Admission charge.
Peak District National Park Visitor Centre - Castleton		Castleton	Multiple	website, includes the Castleton Village Museum
Peak District National Park Visitor Centre - Upper Derwent		Bamford	Natural history	website, exhibits and information about the park
Pickford's House Museum		Derby	Historic house	Late 18th century Georgian townhouse, displays of eighteenth and nineteenth century costume, toys. Operated by Derby Museums charity. Family home of Georgian architect Joseph Pickford.
Red House Stables Carriage Museum		Matlock	Transport	website, THE CARRIAGE MUSEUM CLOSED Permanently - on 31 December 2017, original horse-drawn vehicles and equipment, blacksmith
Renishaw Hall		Renishaw	Historic house	Country house of the Sitwell family, gardens
Revolution House		Old Whittington	Historic house	17th century alehouse with ties to the Glorious Revolution of 1688
Royal Crown Derby Visitor Centre		Derby	Art	China and porcelain decorative art
Shardlow Heritage Centre		Shardlow	Local	website, local history
Sharpe's Pottery Museum		Swadlincote	Art	website, china and porcelain decorative art
Sir Richard Arkwright's Masson Mills		Matlock Bath	Industry	Water-powered cotton spinning mill, includes the Masson Mills Working Textile Museum, part of the Derwent Valley Mills
Stainsby Mill		Doe Lea	Mill	Operated by the National Trust, 19th-century flour watermill located on the grounds of Hardwick Hall
Strutt's North Mill, Belper		Belper	Industry	Part of the Derwent Valley Mills World Heritage Site, former water-powered cotton spinning mill, also includes the Derwent Valley Visitor's Centre. Exhibitions of local cotton spinning and hosiery. Located in William Strutt's fire-proof mill, built in 1804 Admission charge.
Sudbury Hall		Sudbury	Historic house	Operated by the National Trust, 17th century Restoration style mansion, features the National Trust Museum of Childhood
Tissington Hall		Tissington	Historic house	Early 17th century Jacobean mansion house
Wirksworth Heritage Centre		Wirksworth	Local	website, exhibition about the history, industries and people of this historic Peak District market town.

== Defunct museums ==
- Heanor Heritage Centre, Heanor, closed in 2005
- John King Workshop Museum, Alfreton, parts of collection moved to the National Coal Mining Museum for England
- M & C Collection of Historic Motorcycles, Bakewell, closed in 2012
- Life in a Lens Museum of Photography & Old Times, Matlock Bath, closed in 2017-18

== See also ==
- Visitor attractions in Derbyshire
