= Benjamin Bryan =

English journalist and activist (1840–1914)

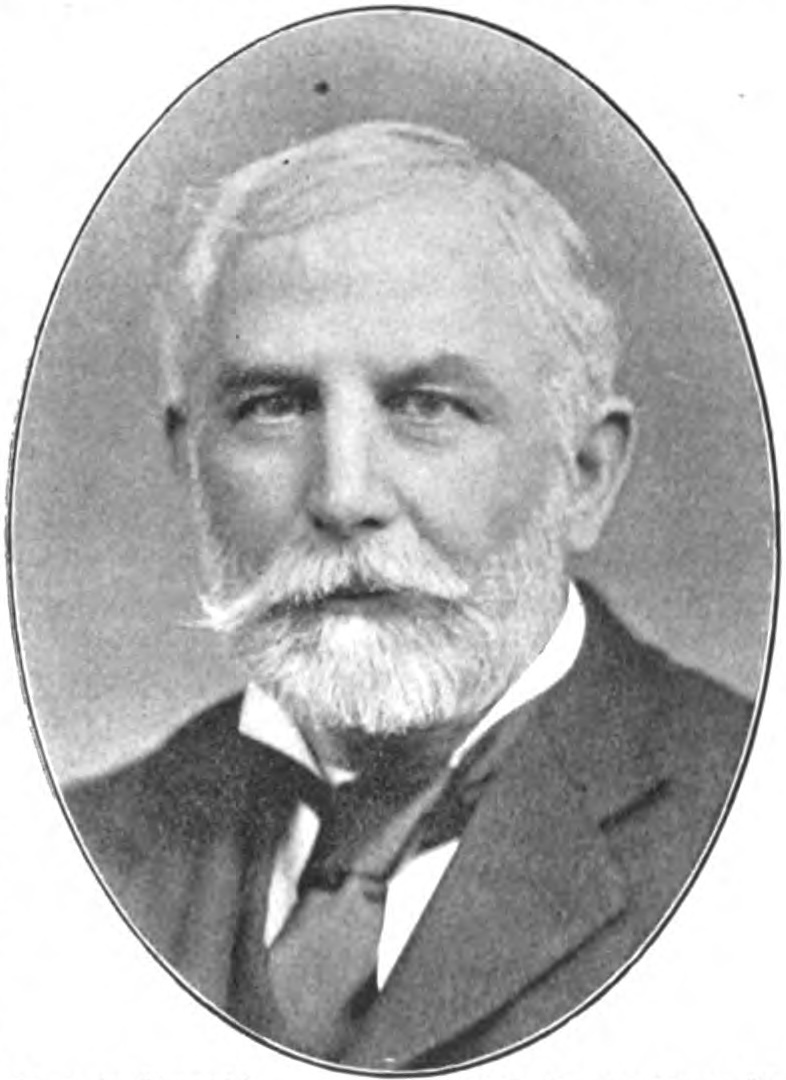
- Bryan c. 1896 by G. Jerrard
- Born: 10 January 1840; Matlock Bath, Derbyshire, England
- Died: 26 January 1914 (aged 74); Belper, Derbyshire, England
- Occupations: Journalist; editor; writer; activist
- Years active: 1853–1914
- Organizations: National Anti-Vivisection Society; National Canine Defence League
- Spouse: Annie Boden (m. 1866, died)

Benjamin Bryan (10 January 1840 – 26 January 1914) was an English journalist, editor, writer, and activist. He began his journalism career at The Derby Mercury in 1853 and later edited newspapers in Blackburn and Canterbury. Bryan was active in anti-vivisection and animal welfare organisations, including the National Anti-Vivisection Society and the National Canine Defence League.

== Biography ==
=== Early life and education ===
Bryan was born in Matlock Bath on 10 January 1840, the eldest son of Benjamin Bryan Sr. and his second wife, Henrietta Bryan (née Butler). His father nicknamed him "Penny Post" because his birth coincided with the introduction of the penny postal rate. Bryan was educated at Mrs. Potter's Dame School on the Dimple, Bonsall Endowed School, and Matlock Green Academy under William Corden Clarke and his brother Edward.

=== Journalism career ===
In 1853, Bryan joined The Derby Mercury. The following year, he began a seven-year apprenticeship with Thomas Newbold. During this period, he learned shorthand and later credited regional journalism with giving him an education that he considered better than university could have offered. By 1860, Bryan was working as a reporter for the Torquay Chronicle. He later worked for newspapers in Bideford and spent two years with the Essex Times. In 1864, he returned to The Derby Mercury and later moved to Blackburn to edit The Patriot and The Standard. He also edited The Kentish Gazette in Canterbury, before returning to Blackburn for a short period.

=== Activism ===
Bryan was involved in the anti-vivisection movement and worked with Frances Power Cobbe; they wrote a book together on vivisection in the United States. From 1883, Bryan was secretary of the National Anti-Vivisection Society, founded by Cobbe in 1875, and edited its periodical, The Zoophilist. He resigned in 1898 and was succeeded by Robert Stewart. In 1899, Bryan served as a representative of the New York State Anti-Vivisection Society at the 1900 Paris Exposition.

By 1908, Bryan was secretary of the National Canine Defence League, and by 1909 he was its chairman and honorary treasurer.

For 15 years after leaving Canterbury, Bryan edited periodicals of the RSPCA and lectured on its behalf.

=== Other activities ===
In 1903, Bryan published Matlock, Manor and Parish, a history of his birthplace that reportedly took more than a decade to research and write. He also contributed articles on archaeology and local history to the Derbyshire Archaeological Journal.

Bryan was a public speaker and supported the Conservative Party in several general elections.

=== Personal life and death ===
Bryan married Annie Boden in 1866. After his wife's death, he returned to Derbyshire and lived in Belper. He died there on 26 January 1914, aged 74. His funeral took place in Matlock on 29 January 1914.

== Publications ==
- The Vivisectors' Directory (1884; editor; introduction by Frances Power Cobbe)
- Vivisection in America (1889; with Frances Power Cobbe)
- Anti-Vivisection Evidences (1895; editor; revised and enlarged)
- Matlock, Manor and Parish (1903)
