= Great Masson Cavern =

Cave in Derbyshire, England

Coordinates: 53°07′28″N 1°33′54″W

Great Masson Cavern is one of two caves at the Heights of Abraham, Matlock Bath, Derbyshire, England. The other is Great Rutland Cavern.

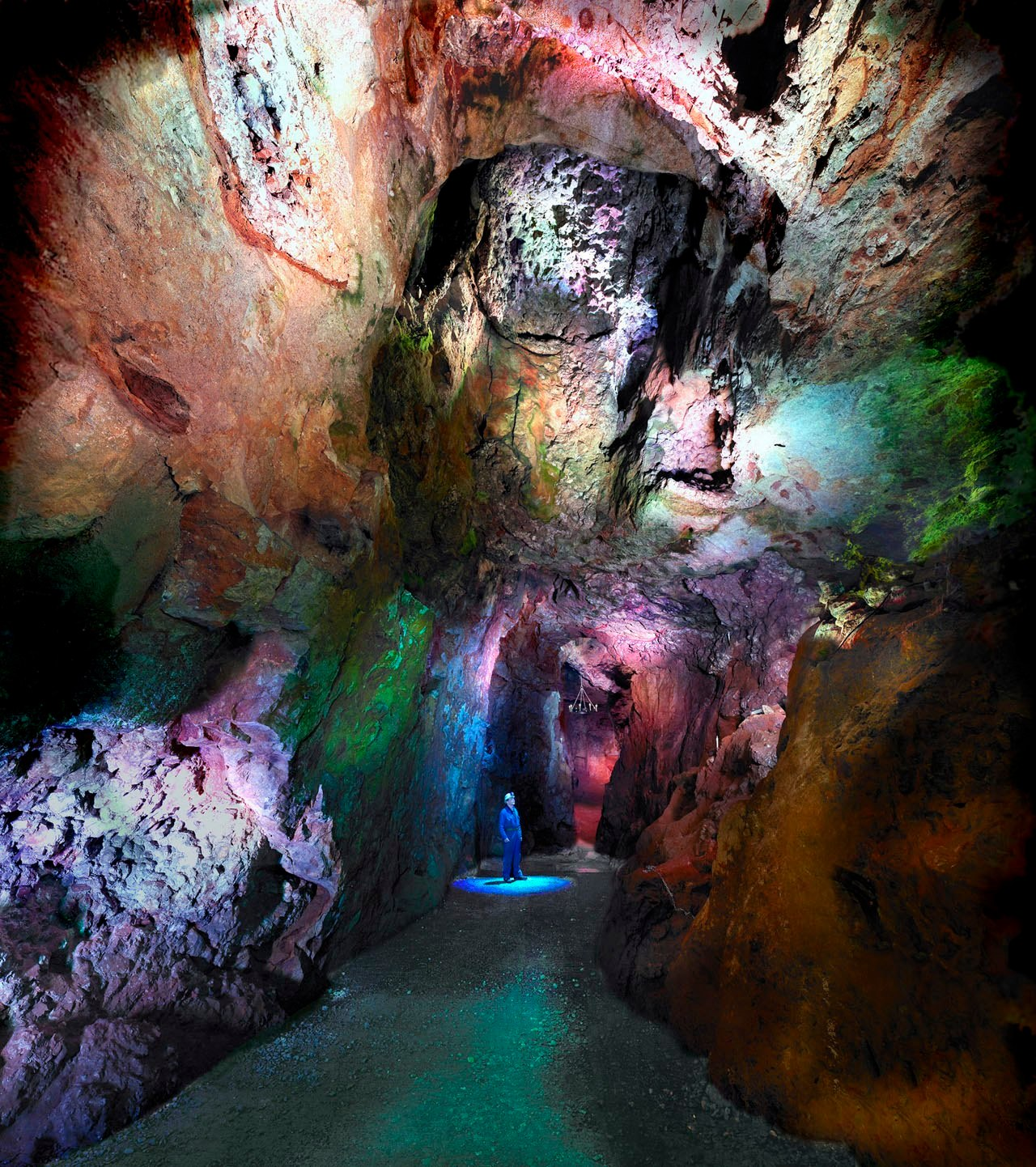
Great Masson cavern lead mining history displays

Great Masson Cavern is notable for its lack of stalactites and stalagmites, as the cave is coated in a clay-like substance that inhibits deposition. However, it still has some rock formations such as "the Owl" and "the Rabbit". It was first opened to visitor viewing in Victorian times and had been mined for fluorspar prior to the opening to visitors.
