= Lovers' Walks =

Public park in Matlock Bath, Derbyshire, England

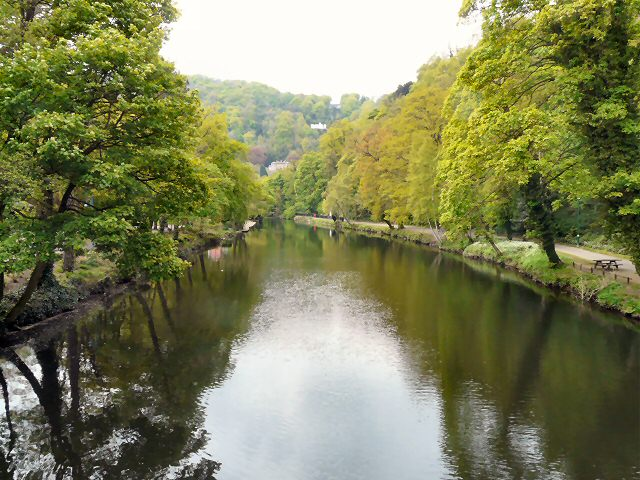
- View north from New Bridge linking Derwent Gardens (left) with Lovers' Walks (right)
- Interactive map of Lovers' Walks
- Location: Matlock Bath, Derbyshire
- OS grid: SK 29531 58055
- Coordinates: 53°07′07″N 1°33′36″W
- Operator: Derbyshire Dales District Council
- Designation: Grade II*
- Website: www.derbyshiredales.gov.uk/leisure/parks-and-open-spaces/lovers-walks-matlock-bath

Lovers' Walks is a public park in Matlock Bath, in Derbyshire, England. Its history dates from the 18th century, and it is listed Grade II* in Historic England's Register of Parks and Gardens. It is designated a Site of Special Scientific Interest.

== History ==
Lovers' Walks, on the east bank of the River Derwent opposite Matlock Bath, dates back to before 1742; it is said be the oldest surviving example of a public pleasure ground. It featured The Cascades, where a thermal spring flowed to the river. The site became in 1782 part of the estate of Richard Arkwright, adjacent to the landscaped gardens of his home at Willersley Castle.

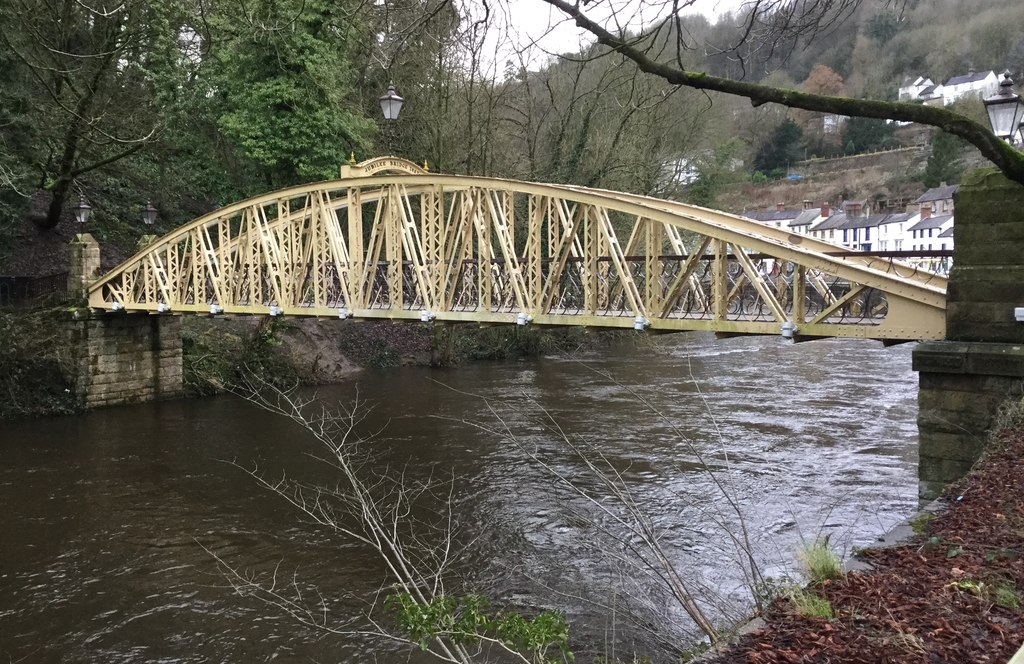
Jubilee Bridge, seen from the north

About 1785 Birdcage Walk, a stepped path leading up the slope, was created by the landscape gardener William Emes. The site was extended northwards at about this time.

In 1887 the Jubilee Grounds were opened in the northern part, accessible from Matlock Bath via Jubilee Bridge. It was a venue for riverside entertainment, with a bandstand built in 1893. Before the bridge was opened, Lovers' Walks was reached only by a ferry, which continued in operation until about 1950. The Ferry Grounds, on the opposite bank of the river, is now the northern part of Derwent Gardens.

== Description ==
The area of Lovers' Walks is about 5 hectares (12 acres). Jubilee Bridge, built in 1887, leads there from North Parade in the village, and New Bridge further south, built in 1969, leads to the site from Derwent Gardens. A path constructed in 1997 leads from Matlock Bath railway station to the northern end of the grounds.

About 60 metres (200 ft) south of Jubilee Bridge there is a children's playground; in the 1920s and 1930s there were animal houses and an aviary nearby. The northern limit of the site was about here before 1785. About 180 metres (590 ft) south of Jubilee Bridge are two small building, a former shop and a shelter once used by ferry passengers.

There is a riverside path, and a parallel path above a wooded slope, which are linked by winding paths. The upper path runs along the limestone ridge at the edge of the woodland, from which there are views towards Matlock Bath and across the countryside.
