= Derwent Gardens =

Public park in Matlock Bath, Derbyshire, England

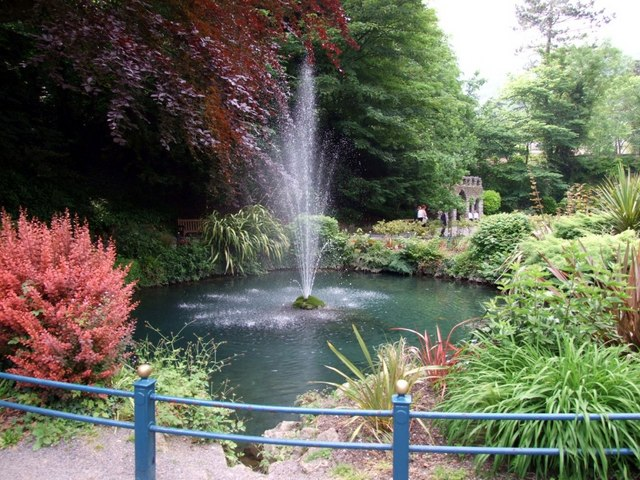
- Interactive map of Derwent Gardens
- Location: Matlock Bath, Derbyshire
- OS grid: SK 29480 57974
- Coordinates: 53°07′05″N 1°33′39″W
- Operator: Derbyshire Dales District Council
- Designation: Grade II
- Website: www.derbyshiredales.gov.uk/leisure/parks-and-open-spaces/derwent-gardens-matlock-bath

Derwent Gardens is a public park in Matlock Bath, in Derbyshire, England. Its history dates from the 19th century, and it is listed Grade II in Historic England's Register of Parks and Gardens.

== History ==
The southern end of the present Derwent Gardens was formerly known as Orchard Holme. It was cleared of trees in the mid 19th century; it was bought in 1880 by Herbert Buxton, a local businessman, and was opened in 1889 as an amusement area featuring a roller coaster. The grounds fell into disrepair in the 1930s, and during World War Two it was requisitioned by the army. After the war it returned to being an amusement area, which included a café, a miniature railway opened in 1949, and an aquarium in a former army building. The area was purchased by Matlock Urban District Council in 1951.

The northern end of the present gardens was formerly the Ferry Grounds, the location since the 18th century of landing stages, catering for tourists.

== Description ==
The area of the park is about 1.5 hectares (3.7 acres). The River Derwent is the eastern boundary of the park, and on the west, above a steep bank, is the A6 road. To the north is the Grand Pavilion. At the southern end there is a bridge, built in 1969, crossing the Derwent to Lovers' Walks, a series of footpaths on the eastern bank of the river.

The gardens were laid out in the late 20th century, incorporating earlier features. There are paths, lawns and flower beds; several thermal springs emerge in the park, from which water features, tufa grottoes and alcoves, created in the late 19th century, were later restored.

Facilities include a bandstand, a children's play area and picnic areas.
