= Heights of Abraham (disambiguation) =

Heights of Abraham may refer to:

- Heights of Abraham, Derbyshire, England
- Heights of Abraham, also known as the Plains of Abraham, Quebec, Canada
- The Heights of Abraham, British electronic music group
