= Life in a Lens Museum of Photography & Old Times =

Former museum in Matlock Bath, England

Coordinates: 53.1212°N 1.5627°W

The Life in a Lens Museum of Photography and Old Times was a museum in Matlock Bath, Derbyshire, England. Opened in 2001, the museum was dedicated to presenting the history of photography from 1839 to around the beginning of the digital age (2001) until its closure between 2017 and 2018.

The museum was housed in five themed rooms in a renovated Victorian building, dating from 1861, on North Parade. There were over five hundred cameras on display and many more items, including mannequins dressed in period clothes, many authentic Victorian or Edwardian.
