= Derby plague of 1665 =

Bubonic plague outbreak in Derby, England

Coordinates: 52.92524°N 1.49003°W

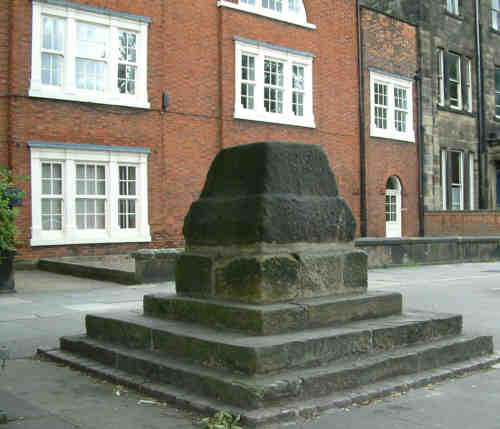
The Headless Cross, also known as the "Vinegar Stone" or "Plague Stone" at Friar Gate, Derby, England.

During the Great Plague of 1665 the area of Derby, England, fell victim to the bubonic plague epidemic, with many deaths. Some areas of Derby still carry names that record the 1665 visitation such as Blagreaves Lane which was Black Graves Lane, while Dead Man's Lane speaks for itself. It has been claimed by some historians that bodies were buried standing upright at St. Peter's Church, Derby, but this legend has been refuted by experts.

Trade was carried out at a Market Stone on Ashbourne Road which leads into the Town Centre. During the epidemic, trade almost ceased and the population faced possible starvation, as well as a cruel death by infection with the plague.

Market stones took many forms, here we see the stone placed at Friar Gate (formerly Nuns Green) at the northern road into Derby (England). This was a medieval headless cross, and also called the "Vinegar Stone" because money was deposited in a trough of vinegar in the top of the stone in the belief that the vinegar would disinfect the coins and prevent the spread of the plague from happening.

Eyam Museum in the village of Eyam in the Peak District, Derbyshire, has a special emphasis on the Plague as it struck Eyam.

== See also ==
- Black Death the mid 14th century start of the pandemic
- Eyam the Derbyshire village that was quarantined
- Great Plague of London epidemic of 1665
