= Eyam Museum =

Local museum in Eyam, England

Coordinates: 53.2871°N 1.6777°W

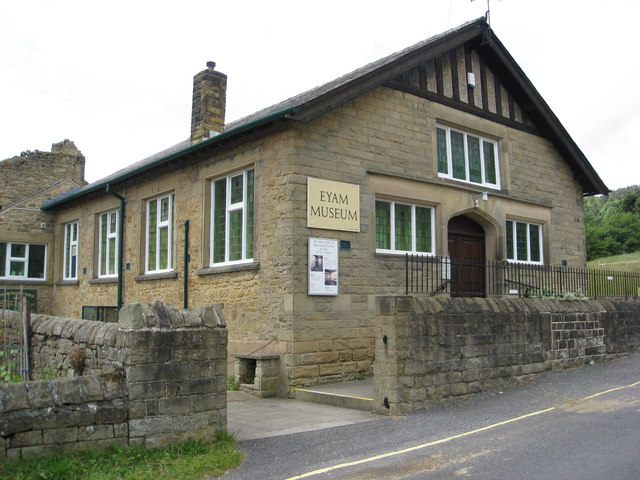
Eyam Museum.

Eyam Museum or as it is locally known Eyam Plague museum is a local museum in the village of Eyam, located in the Peak District, Derbyshire, England.

== Overview ==
Eyam Museum opened on 23 April 1994 as a small museum on a single level.

The museum won the 1998/99 Shoestring Award at the National Heritage Museum of the Year Awards, recognising small museums achieving the best results with limited resources. A model of a Derbyshire lead mine was added in 2002. The museum is staffed by volunteers. It is located in Hawkhill Road.

The museum's galleries present the history of Eyam since prehistoric times, with a special emphasis on the Plague that struck Eyam, known as the Eyam Plague, in 1665.

== The Plague (1665) ==
The museum largely dedicated to Eyam's famous history as a plague village during the bubonic plague of 1665.

== Gallery ==
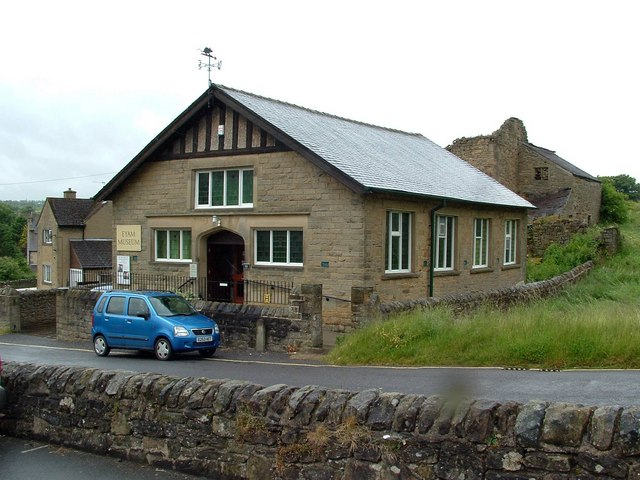
Eyam Museum.

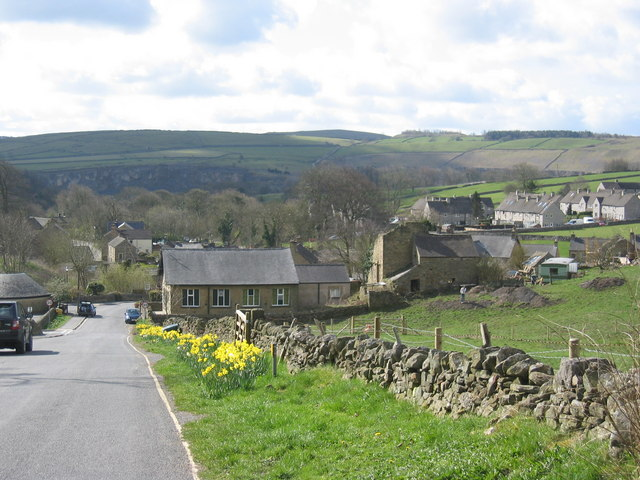
Eyam in bloom: The museum sat nestled in amongst the daffodils of spring

== See also ==
- List of museums in Derbyshire
- Derby plague of 1665
- Eyam Plague Village Website
