= Chesterfield Museum and Art Gallery =

Local museum in Chesterfield, England

Coordinates: 53.2366°N 1.4236°W

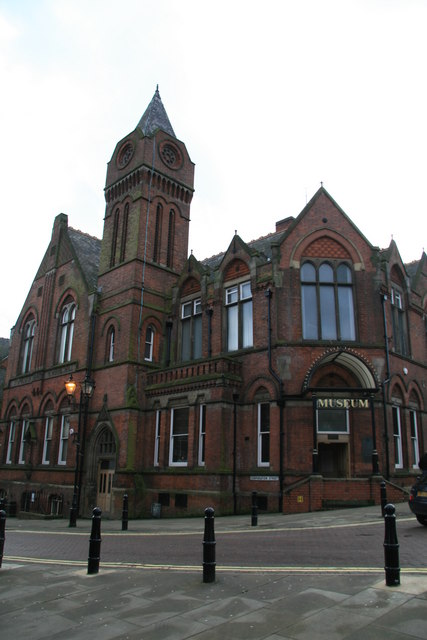
View of the museum building.

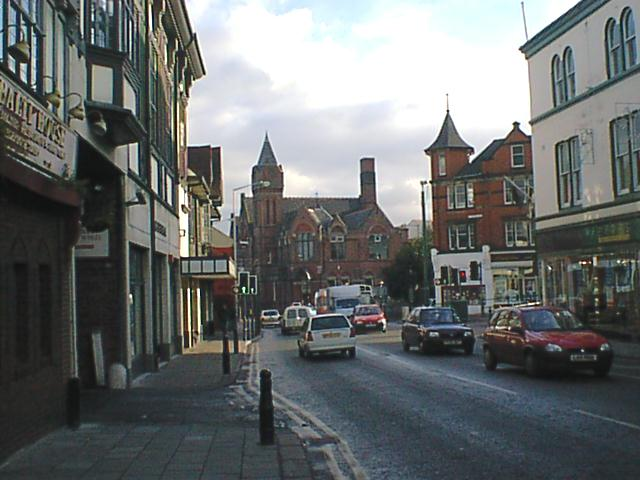
Looking along Holywell Street towards the museum.

Chesterfield Museum and Art Gallery is a local museum and art gallery in the town of Chesterfield, Derbyshire, England.

The hall was named in honour of the British railway pioneer George Stephenson and the museum has a collection of objects relating to the history of the town and its people. The museum is across the road from the Church of St Mary and All Saints, the parish church more popularly known as the Crooked Spire.

The museum, established in 1994, presents the history of Chesterfield from its origins as a Roman fort to the present. It is located on St Mary's Gate in the Stephenson Memorial Hall, dating from 1879 and originally built as a mechanics institute. Later this part of the building was used for the town's public library.

Chesterfield Museum is owned and operated by Chesterfield Borough Council.

== See also ==
- List of museums in Derbyshire
