= Listed buildings in Matlock Bath =

Matlock Bath is a civil parish in the Derbyshire Dales district of Derbyshire, England. The parish contains 44 listed buildings that are recorded in the National Heritage List for England. Of these, three are listed at Grade II*, the middle of the three grades, and the others are at Grade II, the lowest grade. The parish contains the village of Matlock Bath and the surrounding area. The listed buildings are arranged along the valley of the River Derwent and on the steep hillside to the west. Most of the listed buildings are houses, cottages, shops, and associated structures. The other listed buildings include hotels and public houses, churches, a former cotton mill, an obelisk, a railway station and an associated building, a war memorial, and two telephone kiosks.

== Key ==
Grade	Criteria
II*	Particularly important buildings of more than special interest
II	Buildings of national importance and special interest

== Buildings ==
Name and location	Photograph	Date	Notes	Grade
New Bath Hotel; 53.11541°N 1.56109°W		1745	The hotel, which has been successively enlarged over the years, is in stone, mostly rendered and whitewashed, on a plinth, with quoins, and slate roofs. There are three storeys and attics, and a square plan with a northwest wing at an angle. The entrance front has seven bays, with an open Doric porch in the centre. In the left bay is a French window, and the other windows are sashes with moulded surrounds, some in the lower two floors with cornices, and some in the middle floor with pediments. On the other fronts are two-storey canted bay windows. The original plunge bath has survived in the basement.	II
Cliffe House; 53.12942°N 1.56205°W	—	c. 1765	A stuccoed house with a hipped slate roof. There are three storeys and three bays. On the front is a decorative wrought iron porch, and a doorway with an arched head, quoins, and a semicircular fanlight with Gothic tracery. This is flanked by Venetian windows, and the upper floors contain sash windows.	II
Hodgkinson's Hotel; 53.12058°N 1.56365°W		c. 1772	The hotel, which was extended in the 1790s, is stuccoed, on a plinth, and has a slate roof. There are four storeys and three bays. The central doorway has a round arch and a semicircular fanlight, and the windows are sashes with plain surrounds.	II
Old Masson House; 53.11290°N 1.56246°W	—	Late 18th century	A stone house that was later extended, in stone, with quoins, floor bands, a moulded cornice, and a tile roof. There are two storeys, a main range of three bays, a recessed wing on the right, and a later wing on the left. The doorway has a round-arched head, a moulded surround, an architrave, and a segmental fanlight, and the windows are sashes in architraves.	II
Rose Cottage; 53.12114°N 1.56300°W		Late 18th century	The cottage, later extended and used for other purposes, is in stone with quoins, and a tile roof. There are two storeys and a symmetrical front of three bays, and an additional bay to the left. The doorway has a round-headed arch and a wheel fanlight, and the windows are sashes in chamfered surrounds. In front of the garden is a stone wall with moulded flat coping.	II
Temple Hotel; 53.12088°N 1.56441°W		1770s (probable)	The hotel is in painted stone, with quoins, floor bands, and a slate roof. There are three storeys and an L-shaped plan, with wings of three and four bays. In the angle is a Roman Doric portico, and the windows are sashes with plain surrounds. At the end corner of the left wing is a bay window tiered over three storeys.	II
Masson Mill; 53.11263°N 1.56162°W		1783	The mill was built in brick with stone dressings by Richard Arkwright, and has been considerably extended. The original building was of five storeys, raised to six in about 1800, and has a front of 21 bays and sides of three bays. The middle three bays project and are surmounted by a cupola, and the windows are a mix of Venetian windows and lunettes. The mill was extended in the early 19th century, and again from 1900, in Accrington brick, including an engine house, a chimney, and an Italianate tower with Art Nouveau features. The mill closed in 1992 and has been converted for other uses.	II*
Belle View; 53.12214°N 1.56324°W	—	c. 1799	A stone house with a floor band, moulded eaves, and a hipped slate roof. There are two storeys, three bays, and a recessed stuccoed single-storey wing on the left. On the front is a large three-light bow window, the other windows are sashes, and in the wing is a doorway with a semicircular head and a fanlight.	II
Derwent House; 53.12465°N 1.55929°W	—	Late 18th or early 19th century	A stone house with a sill band and a tile roof. There are three storeys and a symmetrical front of three bays. The central doorway has a rectangular fanlight and the windows are sashes; all the openings have plain surrounds.	II
Lower Towers; 53.12251°N 1.56270°W	—	1808 or before	The house is stuccoed, it in Strawberry Hill style with embattled parapets, and has an irregular plan. In the centre is a block with two storeys and two bays, containing windows with ogee heads and Gothic glazing, and a bay window. To its right is a three-storey circular tower, to the left is a recessed wing containing a casement window with Gothic glazing, and at the rear is a five-storey block.	II
Dale Cottage; 53.13155°N 1.55967°W		1820	A stuccoed house with bold lined eaves and a hipped slate roof. There are two storeys and four bays. The central doorway has a gabled surround, and above it is a moulded panel containing the date. The windows are sashes, those in the upper floor with shutters.	II*
136 North Parade; 53.12093°N 1.56326°W	—	Early 19th century	A shop in engraved stucco with a slate roof, three storeys and two bays. The ground floor contains a modern shop front, in the middle floor are two three-light canted oriel windows, and the top floor windows have plain architraves.	II
138–142 North Parade; 53.12084°N 1.56333°W		Early 19th century	A stuccoed shop in a terrace with a slate roof, three storeys and three bays. The ground floor contains a modern shop front, in the outer bays of the middle floor are three-light canted oriel windows, and the other windows are sashes in plain architraves.	II
144 North Parade; 53.12076°N 1.56344°W		Early 19th century	A stuccoed shop in a terrace, with moulded eaves and a slate roof. There are three storeys and three bays. The ground floor contains modern shop fronts, in the right bay of the middle floor is a canted oriel window, and the other windows are sashes with painted stone surrounds.	II
152–158 South Parade; 53.12048°N 1.56368°W		Early 19th century	A stuccoed shop in a terrace, with a slate roof, four storeys and two bays. The ground floor contains a modern shop front, and in the upper floors are sash windows with plain surrounds.	II
160–168 South Parade; 53.12038°N 1.56366°W		Early 19th century	A stuccoed shop in a terrace, with a tile roof, three storeys and four bays. The ground floor contains a modern shop front, and in the upper floors are sash windows with plain surrounds.	II
170–172 South Parade; 53.12028°N 1.56367°W		Early 19th century	A stuccoed shop in a terrace, with false quoins and a tile roof. There are three storeys and four bays. In the ground floor is a modern shop front, and a recessed doorway with a rectangular fanlight on the right. In the central two bays of the middle floor is a large wooden bay window, and the other windows are sash windows with plain surrounds.	II
178 and 180 South Parade; 53.12010°N 1.56364°W		Early 19th century	A stuccoed shop in a terrace, with a slate roof, four storeys and two bays. The ground floor contains a modern shop front, and in the upper floors are sash windows with plain surrounds.	II
182 South Parade; 53.12003°N 1.56361°W	—	Early 19th century	A stuccoed shop in a terrace with moulded stuccoed eaves and a slate roof. There are two storeys and three bays. The ground floor contains a modern shop front, and in the upper floor are sash windows.	II
184 and 186 South Parade; 53.11992°N 1.56358°W	—	Early 19th century	A stuccoed shop at the end of a terrace, with moulded stuccoed eaves, and a slate roof, hipped on the left. There are two storeys and four bays. In the ground floor is a late 19th-century shop front, the upper floor contains sash windows, and in the left return is a round-headed window.	II
High Tor Hotel; 53.12974°N 1.56021°W		Early 19th century	The hotel, in cottage orné style, is stuccoed, with bold eaves and a slate roof with decorative bargeboards. There are two storeys, three gabled bays, and a recessed two-bay wing on the right. On the front is a gabled rustic porch, and the windows have chamfered surrounds and Gothic cast iron glazing bars.	II
Hillside; 53.12218°N 1.56396°W	—	Early 19th century	A stuccoed house with a slate roof. There are storeys, three bays, and a recessed wing on the right with a lean-to roof. In the centre is a tall sash window, flanked by oriel windows each with a moulded underhang, a cornice, and a swept pentice roof. The doorway has a plain surround, and in the wing is a window with a pointed arch.	II
Former Princess Victoria; 53.12018°N 1.56364°W		Early 19th century	The public house is stuccoed and has a slate roof. There are four storeys and two bays. In the ground floor is a 19th-century shop front, the first floor contains two bay windows, and the top two floors contain sash windows.	II
Round House; 53.12230°N 1.56232°W		Early 19th century	A stone house with a hexagonal plan, a single storey, and a slate roof with bold eaves. The doorway and the windows have pointed heads, and the windows contain Gothic glazing bars.	II
The Rocks; 53.13213°N 1.55938°W		Early 19th century	A house, later divided into two, in cottage orné style. It is stuccoed, with bold lined eaves, and a slate roof with ornamental bargeboards. There are two storeys, a main block of five bays, the outer bays projecting and gabled, a single-bay wing on the right, and a rear wing. The outer bays have canted bay windows, most of the other windows are sashes, in the right wing is a balcony over an arcaded loggia, and on the left is a conservatory.	II
The Ruskin Hall; 53.13003°N 1.56041°W		Early 19th century	Originally the servants' hall to Tor House, later High Tor Hotel, it is stuccoed, and has false quoins, bold eaves, and a slate roof with bargeboards. There are two storeys, the gable end faces the road, and the windows are sashes.	II
Obelisk; 53.11847°N 1.56212°W		1820s	The obelisk, which stands at a road junction, is in gritstone. It consists of a tapering shaft in two pieces, about 3.5 metres (11 ft) high. On three sides of the shaft, it is inscribed "TEMPLE HOTEL".	II
Upper Tower; 53.12345°N 1.56465°W		c. 1830	A house in the form of a castle, it is stuccoed and has two storeys. There is a rectangular plan and a recessed wing on the right. On the front are two three-storey circular towers with embattled parapets, and at the rear is a taller tower. The main block has sash window, in the towers are windows with pointed heads and Gothic glazing bars, and in the wing is a window with a small balcony.	II
Woodland Terrace; 53.11513°N 1.55990°W		Early to mid 19th century	The terrace of four stuccoed houses with slate roofs. There are two storeys, each house has three bays, and all the windows are sashes. The left two houses have round-headed doorways with moulded surrounds, wheel fanlights, and keystones. The other houses have pilasters, rectangular fanlights, and moulded cornice hoods on consoles.	II
50–62 North Parade; 53.12181°N 1.56070°W		c. 1840	A row of stone shops with a sill band, a modillion eaves cornice, and a hipped slate roof. There are three storeys and five bays. The ground floor contains 19th-century shop fronts, in the middle floor are tall casement windows with architraves, cornice hoods, and foliated consoles. In front of the middle floor is a wrought iron balcony, and in the top floor are sash windows with plain surrounds.	II
64–70 North Parade; 53.12179°N 1.56101°W		c. 1840	A row of stone shops with a sill band, a modillion eaves cornice, and a hipped slate roof. There are three storeys and six bays. In the round floor is a doorway and a three-light window, and to the left are 19th-century shop fronts. The middle floor contains tall casement windows with architraves, and cornice hoods on consoles, and in front of them is a wrought iron balcony. The top floor contains sash windows with plain surrounds.	II
Holy Trinity Church; 53.11738°N 1.56134°W		1841–42	The church, designed by Weightman and Hadfield in Decorated style, was enlarged in 1873–74. It is built in gritstone with freestone dressings and slate roofs. The church consists of a nave, a south aisle, a north porch, north and south transepts, a chancel with a north organ chamber and a south vestry, and a west steeple. The steeple has a tower with three stages, buttresses, a three-light west window, clock faces, two-light bell openings, crocketed pinnacles, an embattled parapet, and a recessed crocketed octagonal spire.	II
72–86 Fountain Villas; 53.12180°N 1.56143°W		c. 1845	A row of stuccoed stone houses with a hipped slate roof. There are three storeys and six bays. On the front are two Roman Doric porticos and doorways with rectangular fanlights, and the windows are sashes.	II
Belmont; 53.12218°N 1.56356°W	—	1847	A stuccoed house with two storeys, two bays, and a gable containing a quatrefoil-shaped plaque with the date. In the centre of the front is a doorway and a wooden gabled porch, and the windows are sashes.	II
Matlock Bath railway station 53.12240°N 1.55692°W		1849	The station was built by the Manchester, Buxton, Matlock and Midland Junction Railway in Swiss chalet style. It is timber framed with herringbone brick infill, and has a tile roof with overhanging bracketed eaves. There is a single storey, and eight bays, the middle two bays projecting and gabled. The doorway is in the centre, and the windows are mullioned and contain cast iron Gothic glazing bars.	II
Northern building, Matlock Bath railway station 53.12280°N 1.55707°W		c. 1849	The building was erected by the Manchester, Buxton, Matlock and Midland Junction Railway in Swiss chalet style. It is timber framed with herringbone brick infill, and has a tile roof with overhanging bracketed eaves. There is a single storey, and four bays, the outer bays projecting and gabled. There are two doorways in the middle two bays, and the windows are mullioned and contain cast iron Gothic glazing bars.	II
92–98 Fountain Villas; 53.12176°N 1.56183°W		c. 1850	A row of stone houses with quoins and a hipped slate roof. There are three storeys and six bays. On the front are two Roman Doric porticos and doorways with rectangular fanlights, and the windows are sashes.	II
134 North Parade; 53.12099°N 1.56317°W		Mid 19th century	A stuccoed shop at the end of a terrace, with three storeys, three bays, and a two-storey single-bay extension on the right. The ground floor contains a modern shop front, the windows in the main range have two lights, and the window in the extension has three.	II
148 North Parade; 53.12069°N 1.56350°W		Mid 19th century	A building at the end of a terrace, with three storeys, the ground floor in stone with four bays, and the upper floors stuccoed with three bays. It has a floor band, modillion eaves, and a slate roof. In the ground floor is a doorway with a cornice hood on consoles. The windows are sashes, those in the upper two floors with keystones.	II
Methodist Church; 53.12190°N 1.56045°W		1866–67	The church, later used for other purposes, is in stone with quoins, and consists of a nave and a chancel. The front facing the road has a dentilled gable, and contains three giant arches, the middle arch with a doorway and a window above, and the outer arches with round-headed windows, all with hood moulds. Above there are three circular windows. To the left is a tower with three stages, the lowest stage rusticated. Above is a round-headed window, round-headed bell openings, and a short pyramidal spire.	II
Cromford Court; 53.11194°N 1.56401°W		1901	A large house later used for other purposes, it is in stone with rendered brick and timber framing, on a chamfered plinth, with a moulded floor band, and a tile roof with overhanging eaves and ornate bargeboards. There are two storeys and attics, and all the windows are casements. Features include canted bay windows, an oriel window, an octagonal turret with a copper spire, and an entrance archway.	II
War memorial 53.12174°N 1.55903°W		1921	The war memorial in Memorial Park consists of a sculpture in Carrara marble on a pedestal of Cornish grey granite. The sculpture depicts a soldier and a sailor standing across a cairn, holding a flag. The pedestal consists of a pillar with a moulded and dentilled cornice and base and corner pilasters, on a plinth with a laurel wreath in relief. This stands on a stepped base and the memorial is surrounded by a low circular kerb. On the pedestal are inscriptions and the names of those lost in the two World Wars.	II*
Telephone kiosk, North Parade; 53.12176°N 1.56051°W		1935	The K6 type telephone kiosk was designed by Giles Gilbert Scott. Constructed in cast iron with a square plan and a dome, it has three unperforated crowns in the top panels.	II
Telephone kiosk, South Parade; 53.11969°N 1.56322°W	—	1935	The K6 type telephone kiosk was designed by Giles Gilbert Scott. Constructed in cast iron with a square plan and a dome, it has three unperforated crowns in the top panels.	II
