= Heights of Abraham Cable Car =

Coordinates: 53.124292°N 1.560409°W

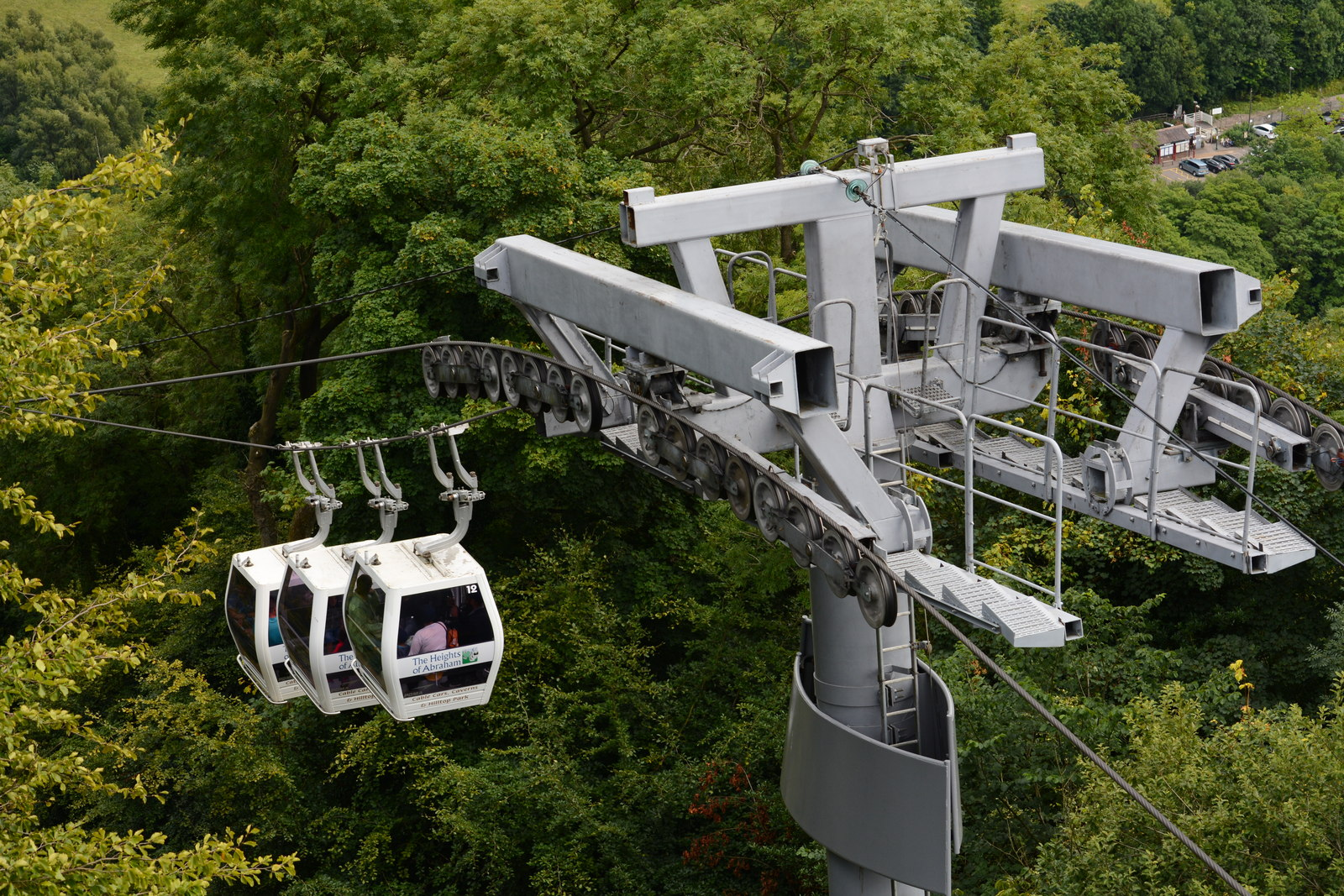
- Interactive map of Heights of Abraham Cable Car

Overview
- Status: Operational
- Character: Gondola lift
- Location: Derbyshire, England, United Kingdom
- Termini: Matlock Bath; Heights of Abraham
- No. of stations: 2
- Open: Spring 1984

Technical features
- Aerial lift type: Mono-cable gondola fixed grip pulsed
- Manufactured by: Poma
- Line length: 1,864 ft (568 m)
- Vertical Interval: 554 ft (169 m)

The Heights of Abraham Cable Car is a gondola lift in the English county of Derbyshire. About 1/3 of a mile long (1,864 feet (568 m)), it links the spa town of Matlock Bath with the Heights of Abraham, a tourist attraction 554 feet (169 m) above. The line was built by Poma and opened in spring of 1984. The cable cars were upgraded in 2004, making them larger and more accessible, to 12 x six-seater cabins, which operate in four trains of three cabins each. An example of the smaller 1984 cabin can be seen displayed at the base station

The line is operated on the relatively unusual single cable pulsed aerial ropeway principle, whereby the cabins are permanently fixed to the cable. To allow passengers to board and alight, the cable is stopped as each train of cabins passes through the stations. As there are four trains but only two stations, this means cabins also stop mid-flight.

The lower station of the cable car is located on the opposite bank of the River Derwent to the Heights of Abraham and the town of Matlock Bath, with the cabins crossing the river at the lower end of their journey. A footbridge provides access from the town to the lower station, which is also situated a short walk away from Matlock Bath railway station.

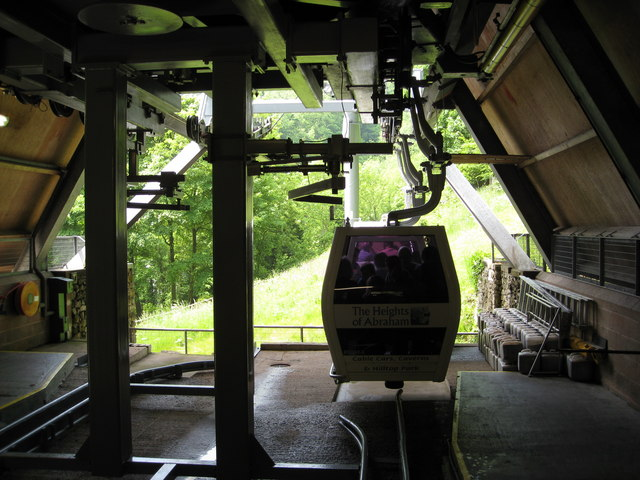
Inside the lower station of the cable car

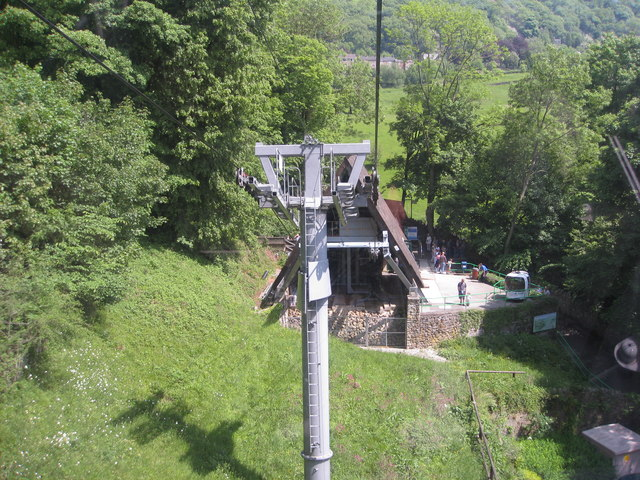
The lower station of the cable car from above

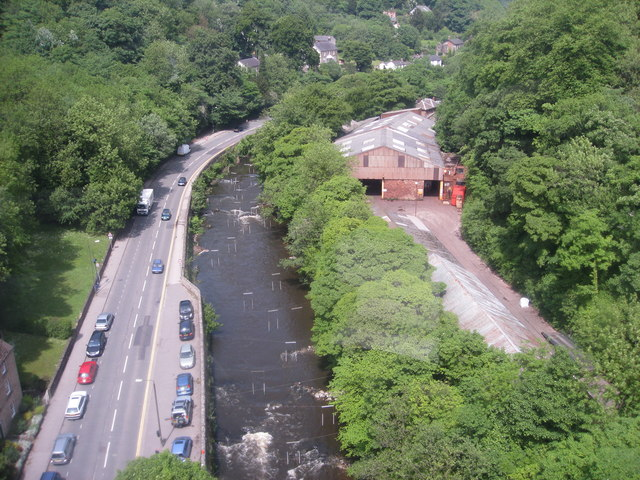
View of the River Derwent mid-flight

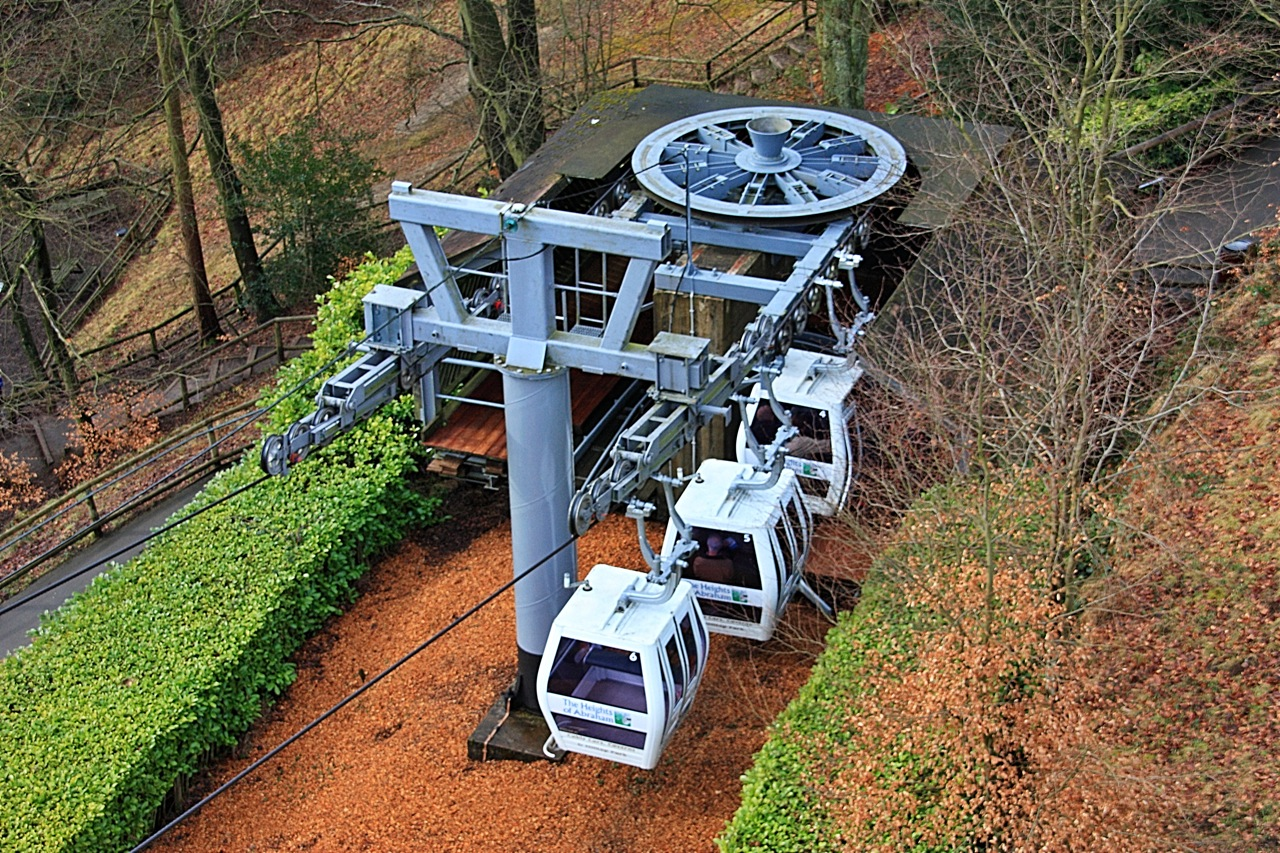
The upper station of the cable car from above
