= Great Rutland Cavern =

Cave in Derbyshire, England

Coordinates: 53°07′28″N 1°33′54″W

Great Rutland Cavern is one of two caves at the Heights of Abraham, Matlock, Derbyshire, England. The other is Great Masson Cavern.

Great Rutland Cavern is a small cave consisting of a narrow passage and a chamber leading into the Nestus Grotto. Occasionally sunlight can be seen through holes in the rock, creating a pattern called 'the devil's face'. At the close of the tour is an audio visual display explaining the grim reality of mining in the 1800s.

It was first opened to the public in 1812 and was then known as Nestor Mine. It was then, and previously, mined for lead and various other minerals.
