= Matlock Bath War Memorial =

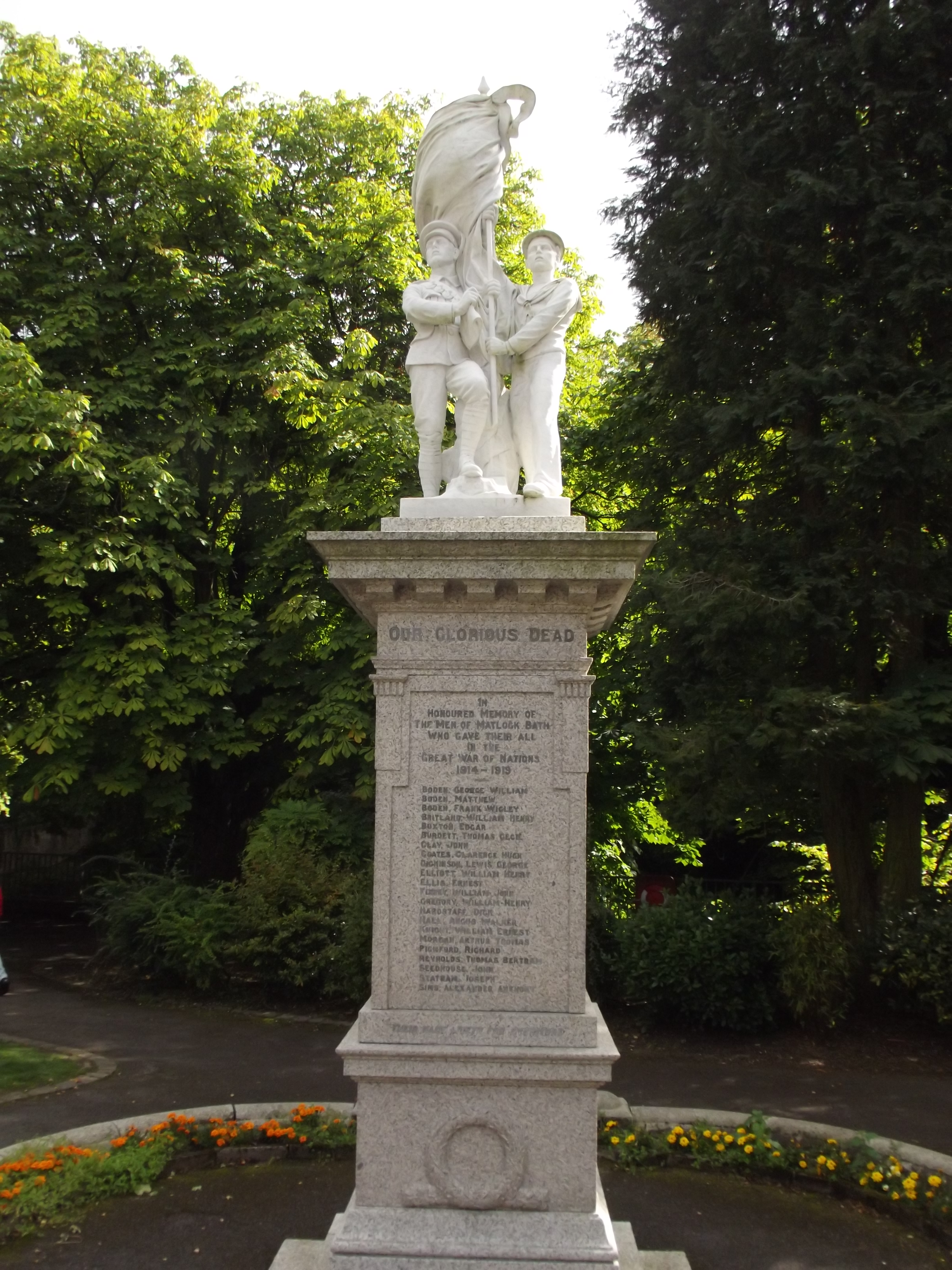
- Matlock Bath War Memorial

- Location in Derbyshire
- 53°07′18″N 1°33′33″W
- Location: Matlock Bath, Derbyshire, England

Listed Building – Grade II
- Official name: War Memorial
- Designated: 12 February 2018
- Reference no.: 1451237

Matlock Bath War Memorial is a 20th-century grade II* listed war memorial in Matlock Bath, Derbyshire.

== History ==
The war memorial in Memorial Park consists of a sculpture in Carrara marble on a pedestal of Cornish grey granite. The sculpture depicts a soldier and a sailor standing across a cairn, holding a flag. The pedestal consists of a pillar with a moulded and dentilled cornice and base and corner pilasters, on a plinth with a laurel wreath in relief. This stands on a stepped base and the memorial is surrounded by a low circular kerb. On the pedestal are inscriptions and the names of those lost in the two World Wars.

The memorial has been Grade II* listed since 12 February 2018.

== See also ==
- Listed buildings in Matlock Bath

== Sources ==
- Hartwell, Clare; Pevsner, Nikolaus; Williamson, Elizabeth (2016) [1978]. Derbyshire. The Buildings of England. New Haven and London: Yale University Press. ISBN 978-0-300-21559-5.
