= Heights of Abraham =

Tourist attraction in Derbyshire, England

Coordinates: 53.12378°N 1.56511°W

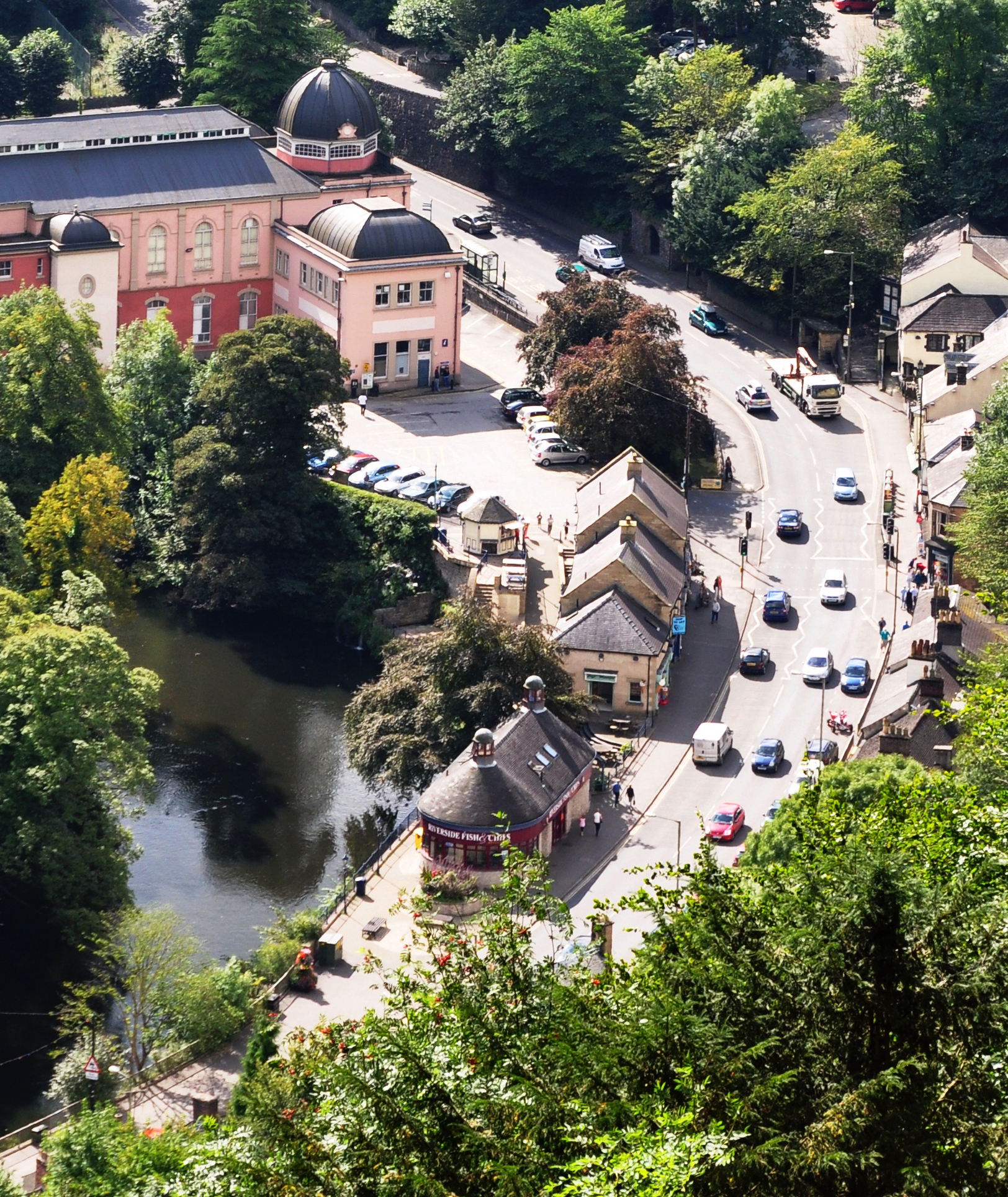
Matlock Bath seen from the Heights of Abraham

The Heights of Abraham is a tourist attraction in Matlock Bath, Derbyshire, England. It consists of a hilltop park on top of Masson Hill, accessed from the village by the Heights of Abraham cable car. The heights are named after a supposed resemblance to the Plains of Abraham, also known as the Heights of Abraham, in Quebec, Canada, where General James Wolfe died in battle against the French in 1759.

Amongst the attractions in the park, which has been open since Victorian times, are cavern and mine tours. There are also views of the dramatic scenery of the valley of the River Derwent. The cable car was opened in 1984 to provide easier access.

The Heights of Abraham are listed as grade II* in the register of historic parks and gardens of special historic interest in England.

== Attractions ==
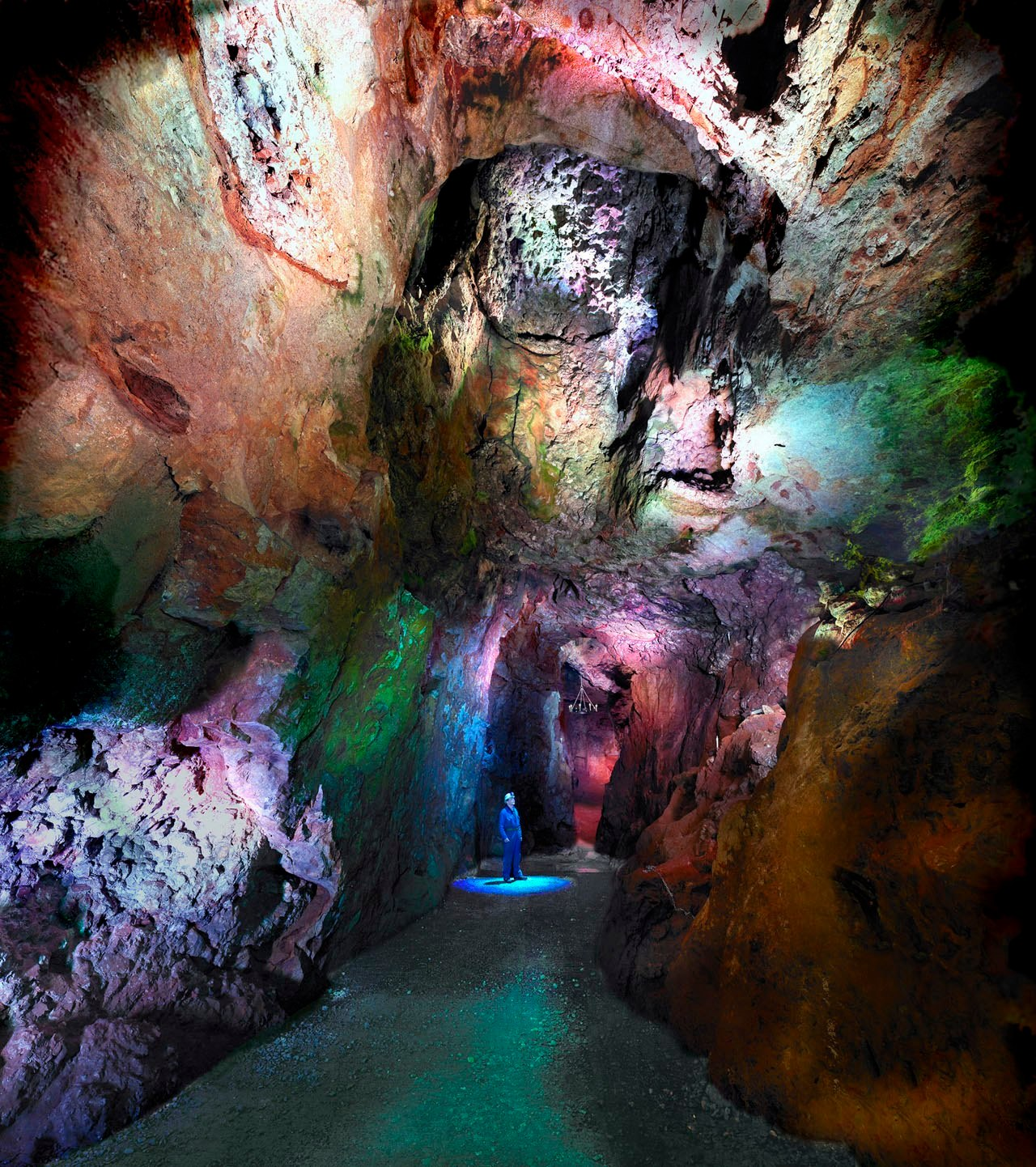
Great Masson cavern lead-mining history displays

There are two caves at the Heights of Abraham, the Great Masson Cavern and the Great Rutland Cavern, both previously mined for lead ore and fluorspar. It is thought that lead mining in this area began in Roman times and reached its peak in the 1700s. As deposits began to dwindle, and cheaper lead was imported in the 1800s, the miners found a far more lucrative use for the caves as tourist attractions; in the process of excavation a large network of caverns and passageways were created which wealthy visitors would now pay to see. There are regular guided tours to retrace the miners' footsteps with a nearby exhibition of photography, fossils and an information film, explaining the cave's history.

The Victoria Prospect Tower was built in 1844 to celebrate the reign of Queen Victoria. From the top of the tower, and from the adjacent amphitheatre, there are panoramic views of the valley of the River Derwent, the spa town of Matlock Bath and the nearby Riber Castle, a ruinous Victorian grand house, and Willersley Castle, a castellated mansion that is now an outdoors pursuit centre. A more modern viewing platform is Tinker's Shaft, which provides valley views as well as a vertical view into the Great Masson Cavern. A view from a different perspective can be obtained from the cable car, as it ascends and descends across the valley to a terminal on the far bank of the river.

The site is home to the Vista restaurant/bar, the terrace café and an ice-cream parlour. There is also a shop specialising in the sale of rock- and mineral-themed items.

== Access ==
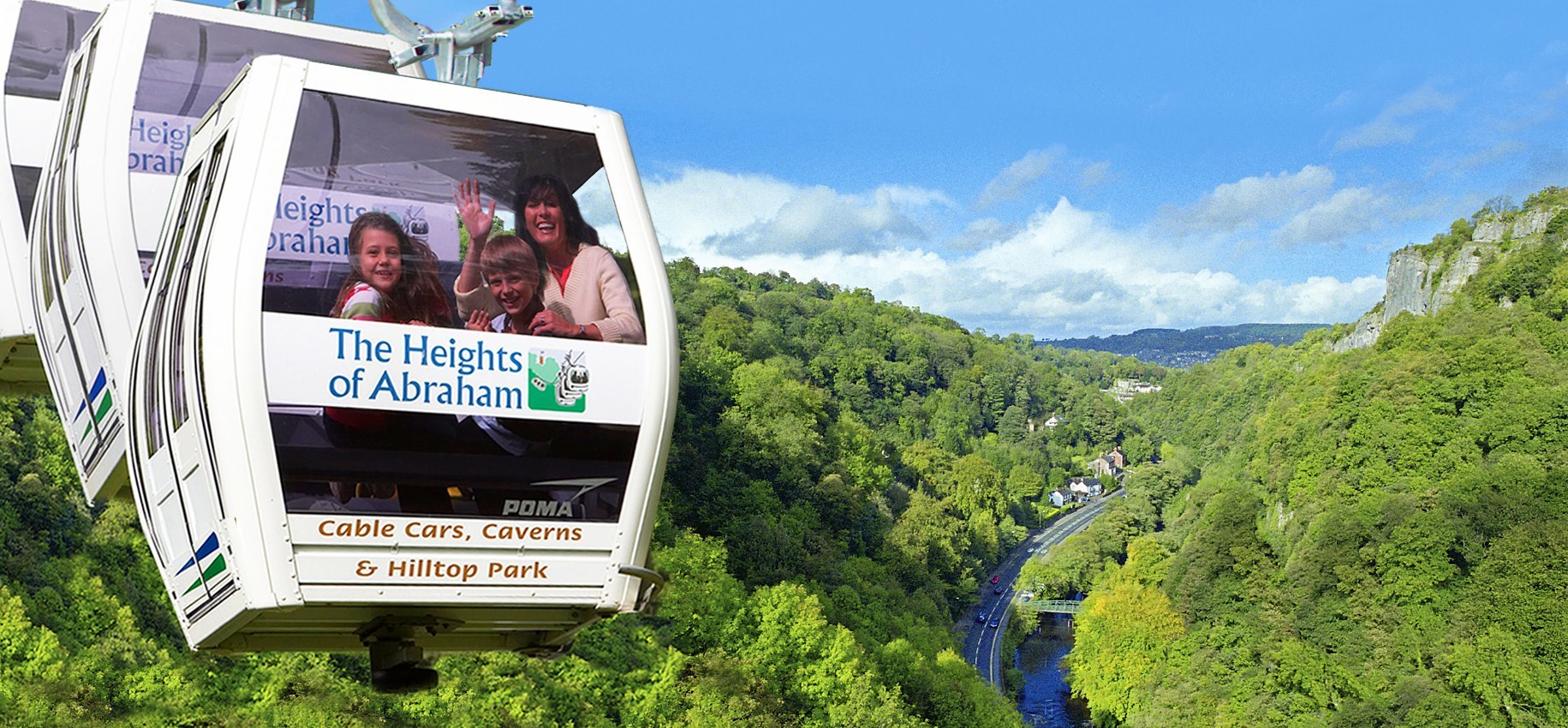
The Heights of Abraham cable cars over the Derwent Valley

Access to the Heights of Abraham is by the cable car only. The lower station of the cable car is located on the opposite bank of the River Derwent to the Heights of Abraham and the town of Matlock Bath, with the cabins crossing the river at the lower end of their journey. A footbridge provides access from the town to the lower station, which is also a short walk away from Matlock Bath railway station.

The site is privately run, and an admission charge is applied. The admission charge covers admission to all the attractions and cave tours. The site is open every day from February to early November, and on various other days. Opening times are 10:00 to 16.30, and later during holidays.
