= Matlock Bath railway station =

Railway station in Derbyshire, England

Coordinates: 53.122°N 1.558°W

Matlock Bath
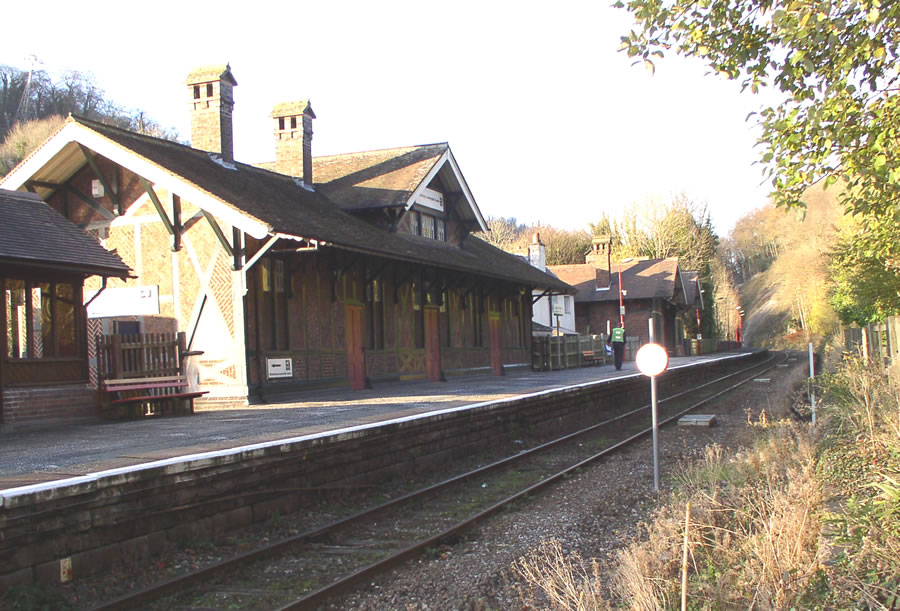
- Matlock Bath station, 2007

General information
- Location: Matlock Bath, Derbyshire Dales; England
- Grid reference: SK297584
- Manager: East Midlands Railway
- Platforms: 1

Other information
- Station code: MTB
- Classification: DfT category F2

Key dates
- 4 June 1849: Opened
- 6 March 1967: Closed
- 27 May 1972: Reopened

Passengers
- 2021/22: ▲61,028
- 2022/23: ▲68,466
- 2023/24: ▲71,396
- 2024/25: ▲83,590
- 2025/26: ▲90,180
Location
Notes
- Passenger statistics from the Office of Rail and Road

Matlock Bath railway station serves the village of Matlock Bath in Derbyshire, England. It is a stop on the Derwent Valley Line, which connects Derby with Matlock. The station building is Grade II listed and is located 16.25 miles (26.15 km) north of Derby; it is owned by Network Rail and managed by East Midlands Railway.

== History ==
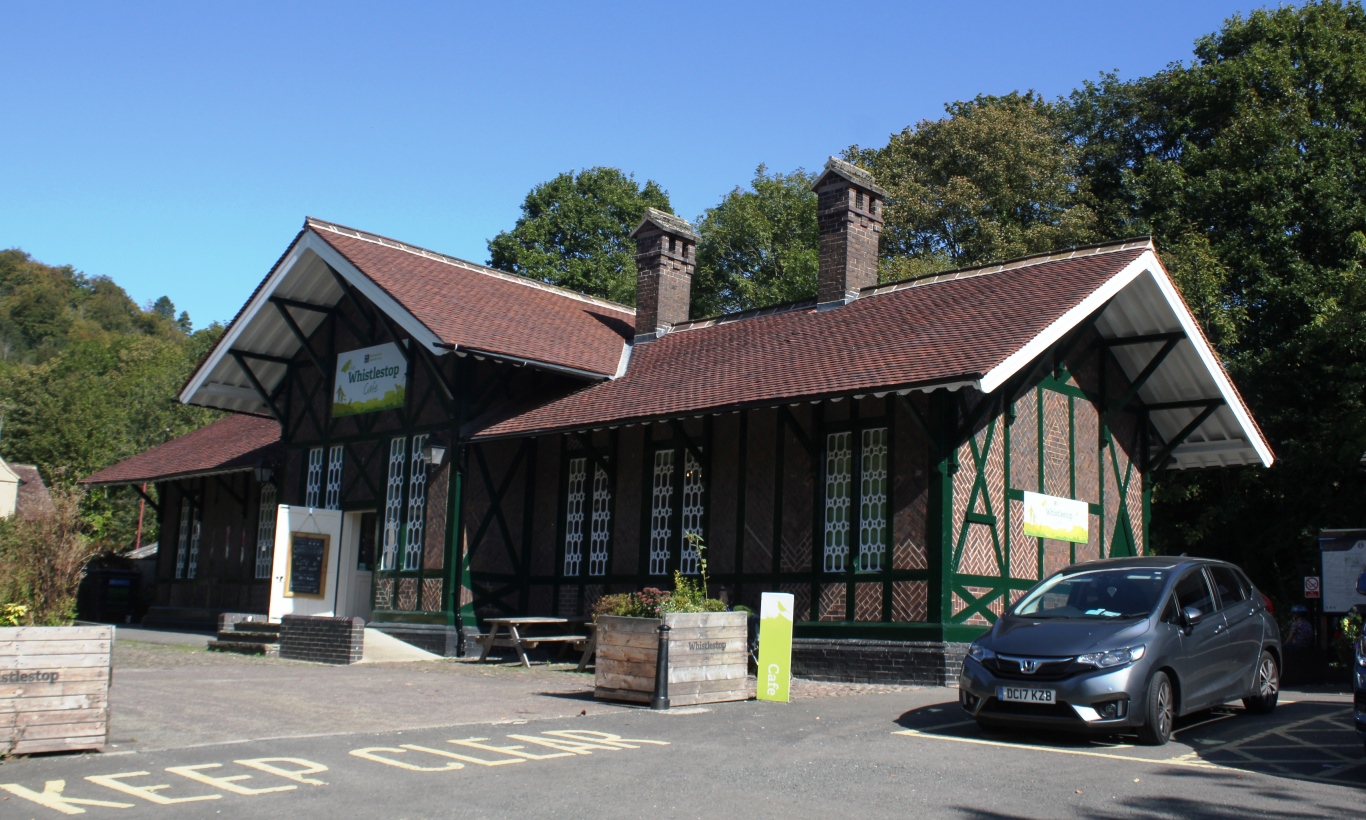
The 'chalet'-style station building seen from the car park

Opened by the Manchester, Buxton, Matlock and Midland Junction Railway on 4 June 1849, the station closed on 6 March 1967 and reopened on 27 May 1972.

In recent times, the usage of the station has increased; for example, in the year 1 April 2009 to 31 March 2010, journeys increased by 62%.

The station buildings have an unusual chalet-style, inspired by the romantic notion at the time that the resort was England's Little Switzerland. The Heights of Abraham cable car runs from near the station up to the Heights of Abraham visitor attraction.

The station buildings have been occupied by Derbyshire Wildlife Trust since the 1980s; they were restored in period-style and opened as a cafe/visitor centre in 2019 after a grant from the National Lottery Heritage Fund, with additional support from Derbyshire Dales and Derbyshire County councils, and other donations.

== Services ==
All services at Matlock Bath are operated by East Midlands Railway, using Class 170 diesel multiple units.

The typical off-peak service is one train per hour in each direction to and from Matlock and Lincoln, via Derby, Nottingham and Newark Castle with one train every two hours extending to Cleethorpes.On Sundays, the station is served by hourly.

Preceding station	National Rail	Following station
Cromford	East Midlands Railway Derwent Valley Line	Matlock

== Public safety issues ==
In October 2015, Network Rail released CCTV footage showing members of the public taking selfie photographs on the main crossing over the tracks at the station. It issued a safety warning, asserting the railways were not for taking photographs on and that trains can appear without warning. Network Rail said it was releasing the footage to highlight the dangerous practices, particularly involving children on the railway line. The crossing has since been closed to the public.

== See also ==
- Listed buildings in Matlock Bath
