= Derby Mercury =

Newspaper

The Derby Mercury was a local, broadsheet newspaper, based in Derby, Derbyshire, England. It ran from 1732 until 1900.
