= Peak District Lead Mining Museum =

Mining museum in Matlock Bath, England

Coordinates: 53°07′11″N 1°33′48″W

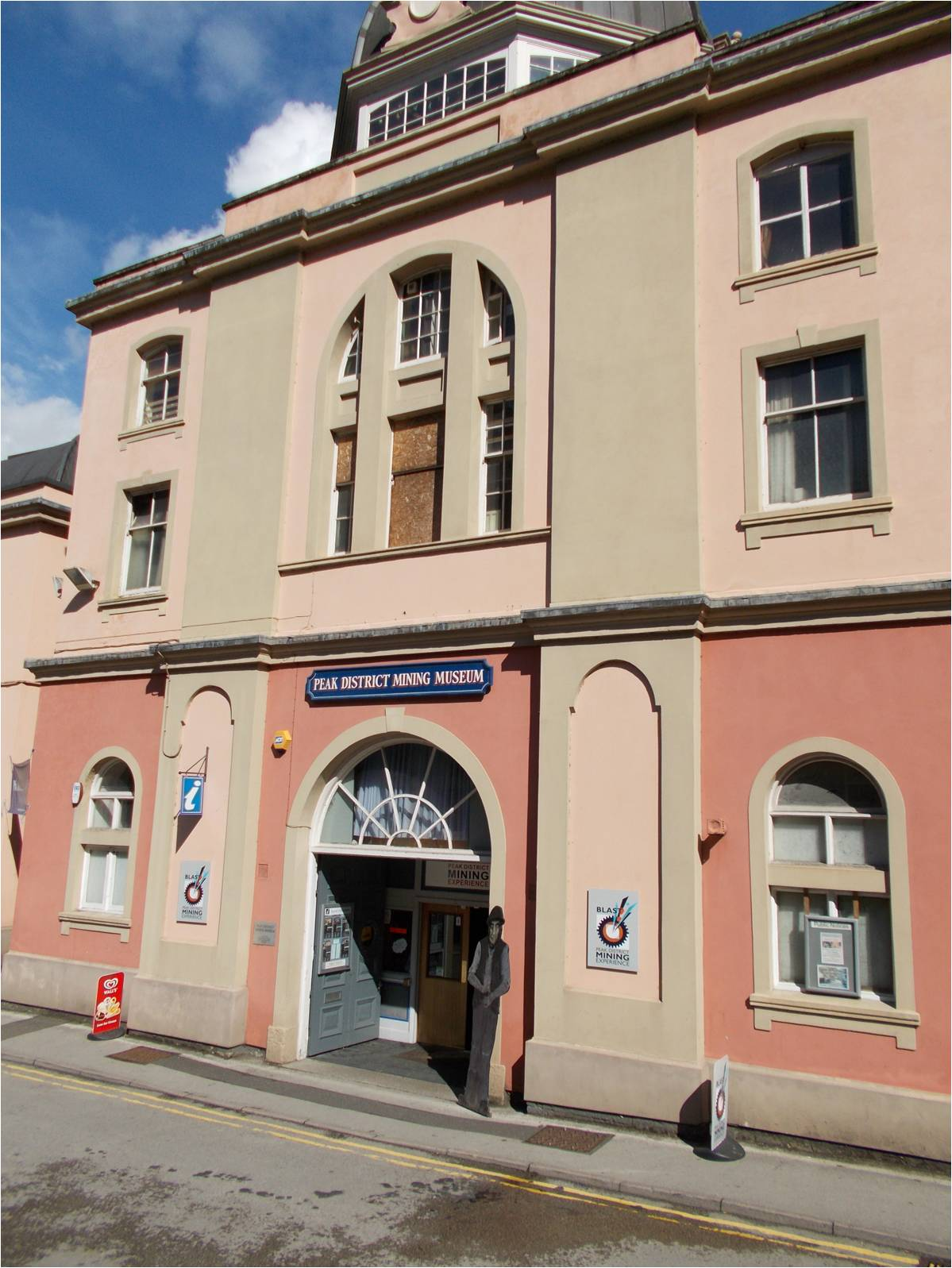
Peak District Lead Mining Museum

The Peak District Lead Mining Museum is located at Matlock Bath, Derbyshire, England. The Peak District Mining Museum is operated as charity by the Peak District Mines Historical Society. The museum is housed inside Matlock Bath's Grand Pavilion.

The museum has mock-ups of a lead mines & shafts in which children may safely experience and explore how the miners were used in this dangerous aspect of England's industrial past.

The museum currently runs guided tours of a local 1920s fluorite mine 'Temple Mine' which is situated across the road, up on Temple Walk.

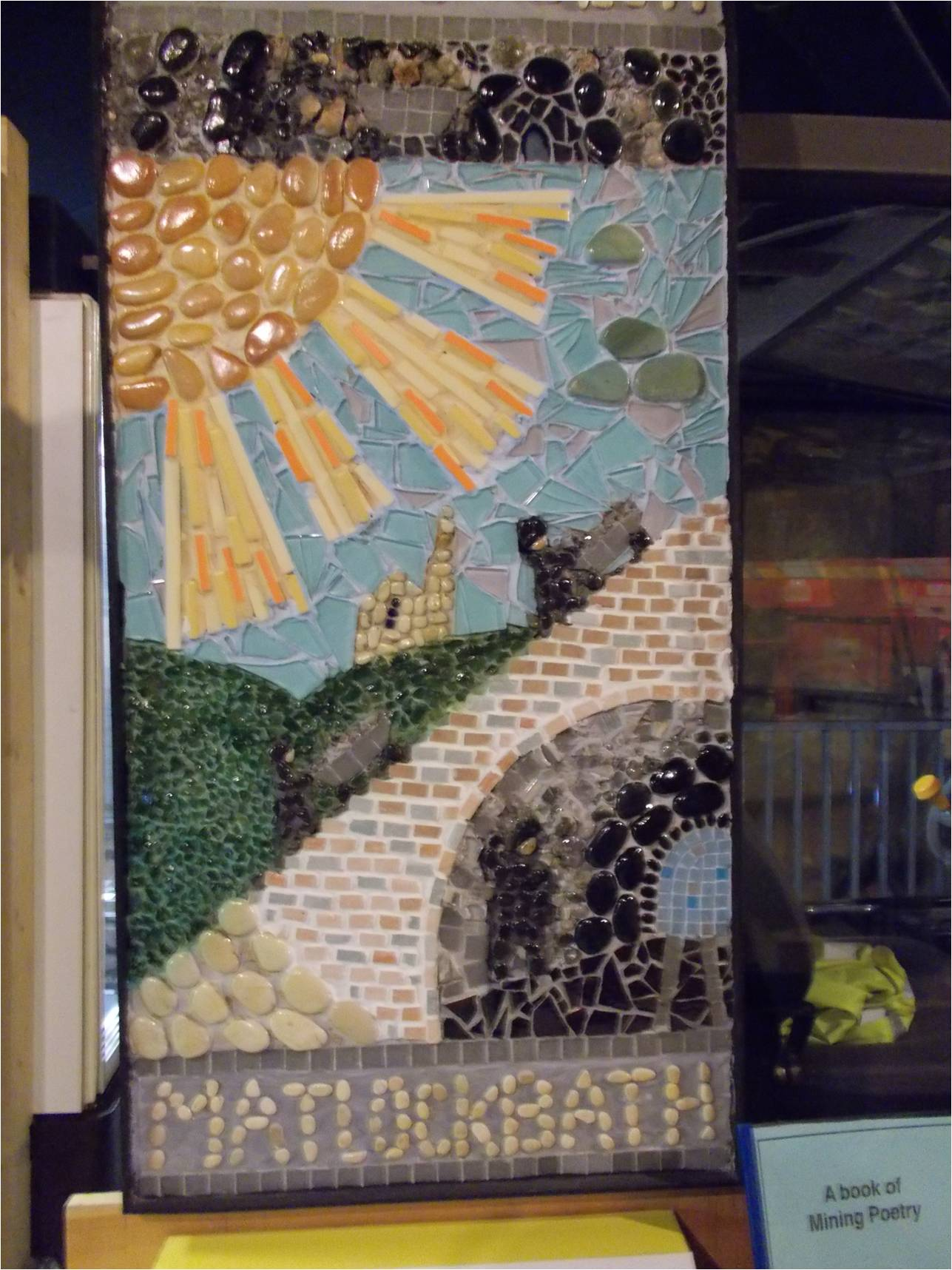
Art from Mining museum in Matlock Bath

== See also ==
- Derbyshire lead mining history
