= Grand Pavilion, Matlock Bath =

Coordinates: 53.1193°N 1.5625°W

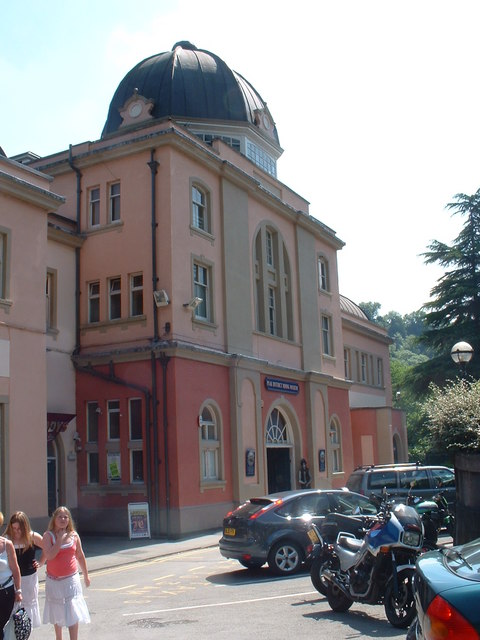
Grand Pavilion, Matlock Bath

The Grand Pavilion, Matlock Bath, is an Edwardian building in Matlock Bath, Derbyshire, England, built in 1910 and run by the local community and operated by their own charitable company. It houses the Peak District Lead Mining Museum.

In 2010, Derbyshire Dales District Council began a consultation looking at prospects for removing the building from their ownership. This action put the building's future at risk, and in response to this threat a local community action group, the Save the Pavilion Group, was created to save the building.

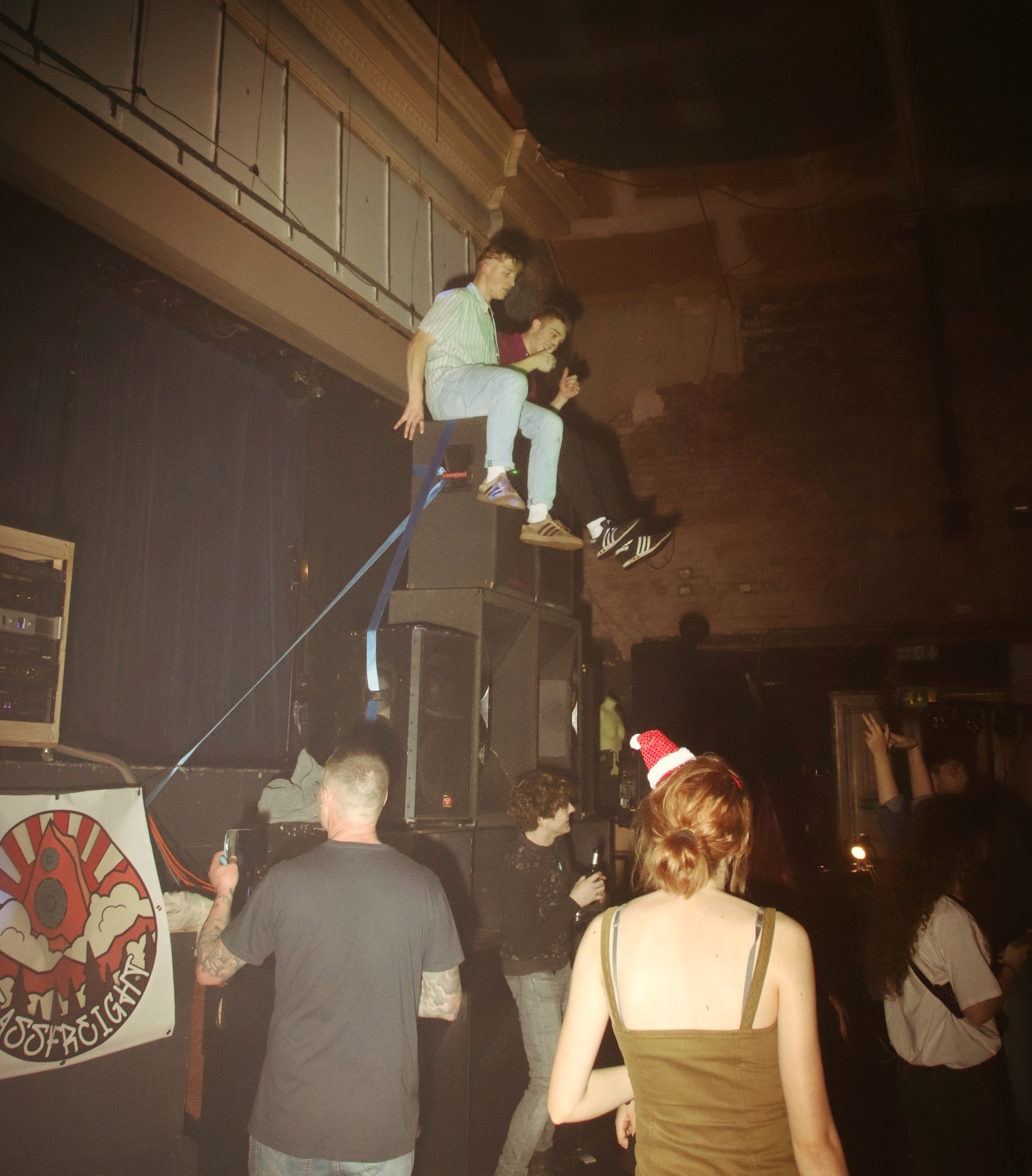
The Christmas Get Down at the Grand Pavilion, December 2019

The Matlock Bath Pavilion has been home to many music events. The building housed a nightclub until the early 2000s, resuming this function in 2019 when the main hall was used for a Rave held by a local radio station and a 15k Soundsystem. Performers on the night included members of The Shining Path Collective alongside DJ's Wrighty, MAKS, N2G and MC Natz.

The Save the Pavilion Group successfully extended the consultation deadline, which allowed them to create a feasibility study examining how the building could be protected and safeguarded in the future by returning the building to its original use as a theatre, music and entertainment venue with a community function for the local population.

The feasibility study was accepted by Derbyshire Dales District Council in 2012, and it was agreed that the Save the Pavilion Group would take on the lease of the building. In the same year, the Save the Pavilion Group was renamed The Grand Pavilion Ltd and was registered both as an Ltd company and a charity.
