= Matlock Bath =

Village in Derbyshire, England

Coordinates: 53.11°N 1.56°W

- Village
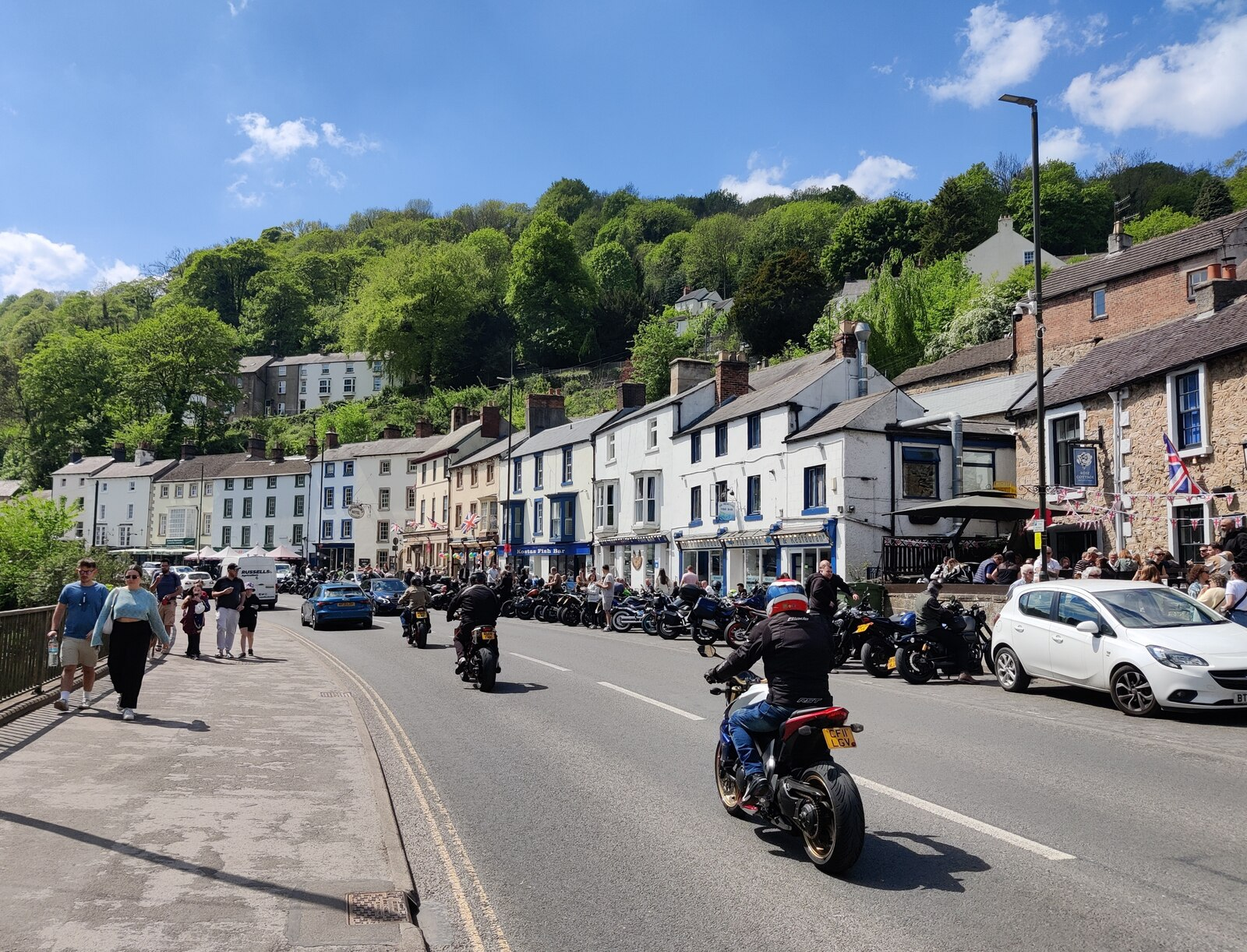
- North Parade

- Location within Derbyshire
- Population: 753 (2011)
- OS grid reference: SK293579
- Civil parish: Matlock Bath
- District: Derbyshire Dales
- Shire county: Derbyshire
- Region: East Midlands
- Country: England
- Sovereign state: United Kingdom
- Post town: MATLOCK
- Postcode district: DE4
- Dialling code: 01629
- Police: Derbyshire
- Fire: Derbyshire
- Ambulance: East Midlands
- UK Parliament: Derbyshire Dales

Matlock Bath is a village and civil parish in Derbyshire, England. It lies in the Derbyshire Dales, south of Matlock on the main A6 road, and approximately halfway between Buxton and Derby. The population of the civil parish at the 2011 census was 753. Originally built at the head of a dead-end dirt road running along the valley of the River Derwent from Matlock, the settlement developed in the 19th century as residential and a spa town which remains a tourist destination. The steep hillside restricts development, with most buildings on one side of the valley and only footbridges across the river. The road was upgraded, becoming a through-way, now designated A6, avoiding the previous coaching road approach to Matlock from Cromford over very steep hills near to the Riber plateau area.

Matlock Dale is a hamlet about 0.5 miles (0.8 km) north of the village, and the term also refers to this stretch of the river valley.

== History ==
In 1698, warm springs were discovered and a bath house was built. As the waters became better known, access was improved by building the bridge into Old Matlock and in 1783, the opening of a new entrance at the south of the valley. Princess Victoria of Kent's royal visit in 1832 confirmed Matlock as a society venue of the time. Victoria's party visited a pair of museums and a petrifying well. John Ruskin and Lord Byron were visitors, Byron comparing it with alpine Switzerland, leading to a nickname of Little Switzerland. Erasmus Darwin recommended the area to Josiah Wedgwood I for its beauty and soothing waters, and members of the families vacationed and settled there. Edward Levett Darwin, son of Francis Sacheverel Darwin, lived at Dale House in Matlock Bath, where he was a solicitor.

When the North Midland Railway opened in 1840, carriages plied for hire from Ambergate station. The Birmingham and Derby Junction Railway ran a number of excursions, taking the passengers onward from Ambergate by the Cromford Canal.

Matlock Bath is a designated conservation area with an Article 4 direction in relation to properties, predominantly along North and South Parade.

== Government ==
Matlock Bath is in the local government district of Derbyshire Dales, and is part of the parliamentary constituency of the same name. The Member of Parliament is John Whitby of the Labour Party.

== Tourism ==
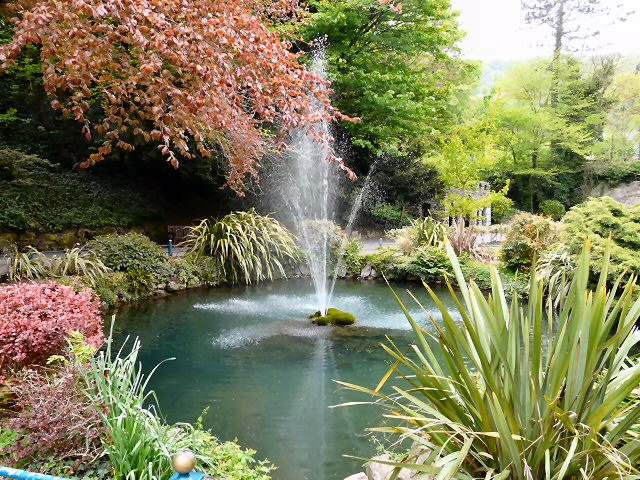
Fountain in Derwent Gardens

Matlock Bath has attractions including the Heights of Abraham park, Gulliver's Kingdom theme park, the Peak District Lead Mining Museum, the former Life in a Lens Museum of Photography & Old Times, the Grand Pavilion, Derwent Gardens, Lovers' Walks and an aquarium.

On the opposite bank of the river Derwent stands High Tor, a sheer cliff used by climbers and walkers. High Tor features Giddy Edge, a narrow winding path along the cliff edge. The Heights of Abraham cable cars link the base of High Tor rising to the Heights of Abraham.

In autumn of each year, the "Venetian Nights" are held with illuminations along the river and illuminated boats.

On Sundays in summer many hundreds of motorcyclists congregate in the town.

== Popular culture references ==
Andrew Asibong's phantasmagorical novel Mameluke Bath is set in a futuristic version of Matlock Bath, and Eleanor Bowen-Jones' film Return to Mameluke Bath explores both real and fictional versions of the town.

Each year the Parish Council organises Pro Loco events in the area. There are pro loco art and photography competitions which are free to enter.

The village is mentioned in the Half Man Half Biscuit song "The Light at the End of the Tunnel (Is the Light of an Oncoming Train)".

== Transport ==
=== Railway ===
Matlock Bath railway station was built in 1849 on the Midland Railway line between London and Manchester. The section from Matlock to Buxton was closed in 1968, as result of the Beeching cuts.

Today, trains run generally hourly each way between Matlock and Derby on the Derwent Valley Line, operated by East Midlands Railway.

=== Roads ===
The A6, which links Carlisle with Luton, passes through the town; it provides access to Manchester, Stockport, Bakewell, Matlock and Derby.

== Sport ==
The River Derwent in Matlock Bath is a location for canoeing, both recreational and competitive. Matlock Canoe Club hosts national-level wild-water racing and slalom events here, and it is an assessment location for the BCU 4 Star award.

There are numerous cliffs around Matlock Bath used for rock climbing. Generally unequipped, the climbing on the cliffs is in traditional style placing protection as you go. High Tor, Pic Tor, Willersley Castle Rocks, Wildcat crags and many others are all documented as having many climbs.

== Notable people ==
- Louise Rayner (1832–1924), a British watercolour artist.
- Benjamin Bryan (1840–1914), journalist, editor, writer, and anti-vivisection and animal welfare activist
- Sir George Newnes, 1st Baronet (1851–1910), publisher, editor and politician, MP for Swansea 1900–1910.
- Horace W. B. Donegan (1900–1991), the Episcopal Bishop of New York from 1950 to 1972.
- Phillip Whitehead (1937–2005), politician, TV producer and writer.

== Gallery ==
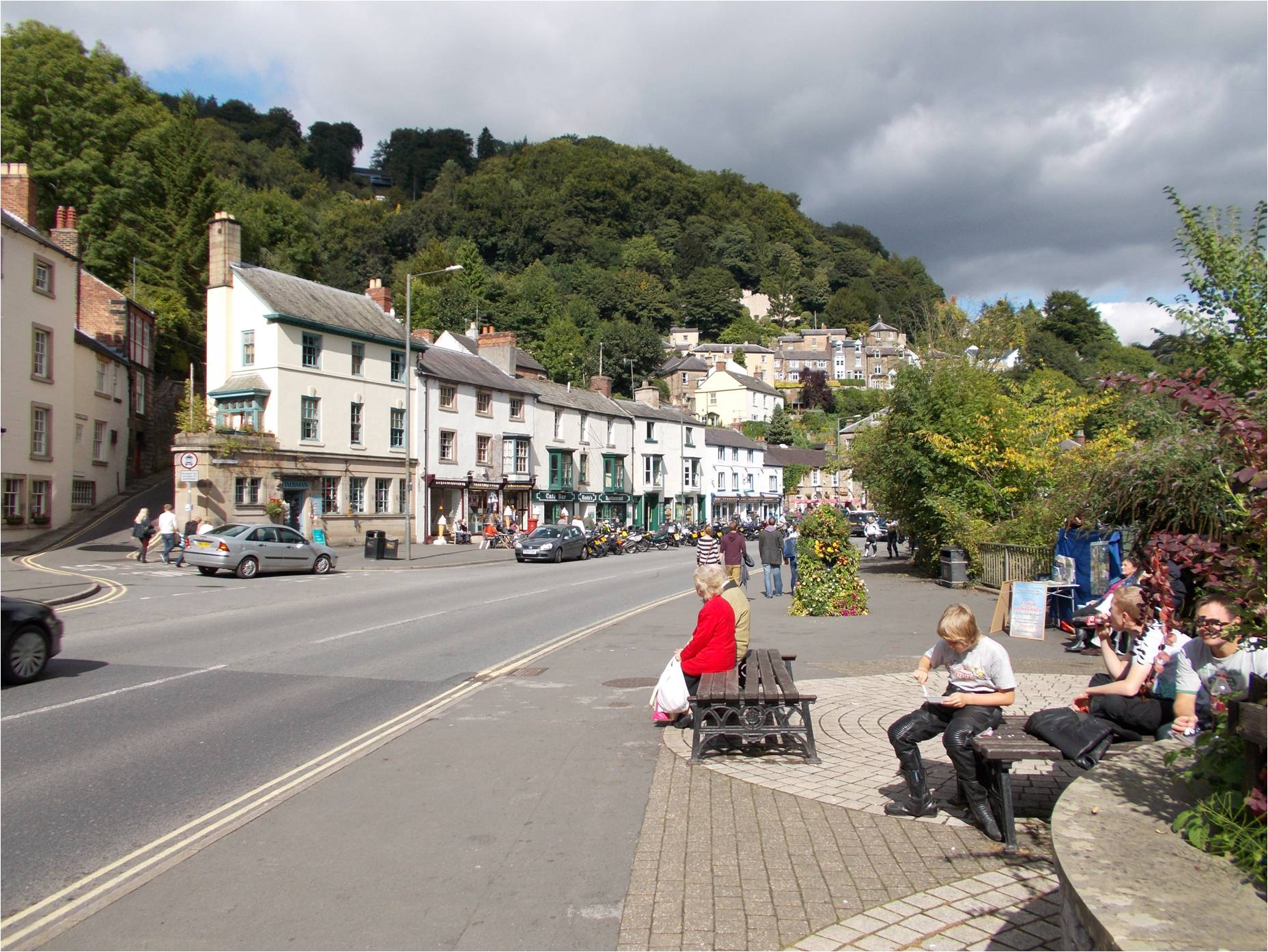
The main shopping and refreshment area situated on the A6 road, Matlock Bath

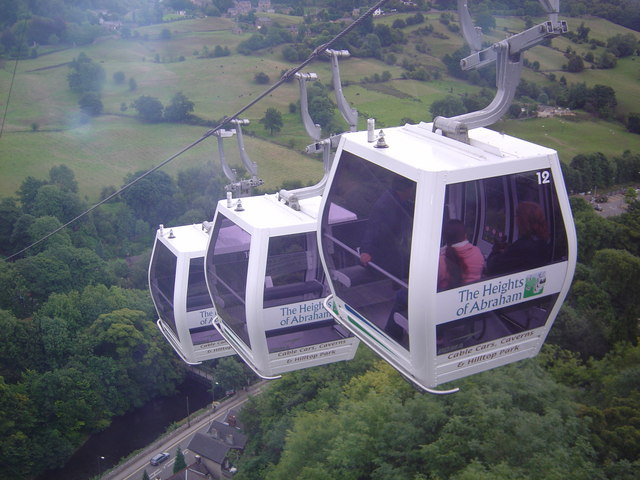
Cable Cars high above the A6 road and the River Derwent

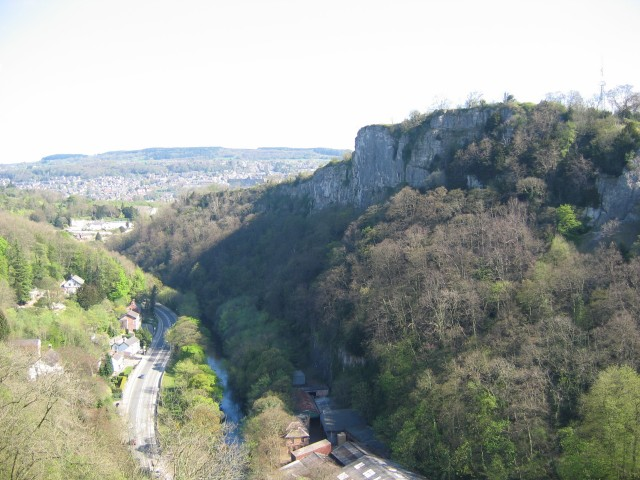
View of High Tor from the cable car showing the A6 road through the Bath with Matlock town in the distance

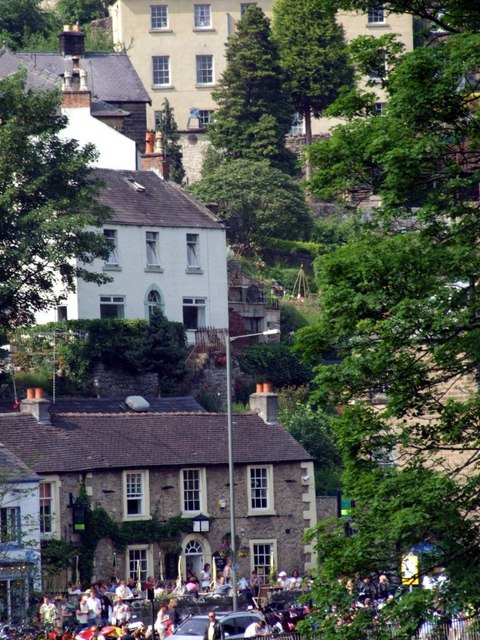
Most of the development on one side of the valley – steep hillside building solutions

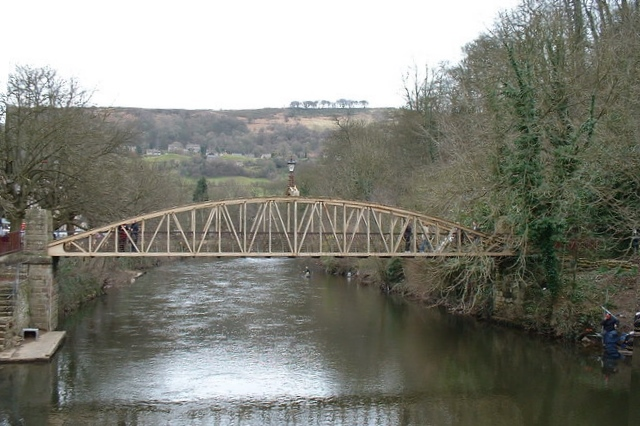
Most of the development on one side of the valley – footbridge over the River Derwent

== See also ==
- Listed buildings in Matlock Bath
- St John the Baptist's Chapel, Matlock Bath
- Grand Pavilion, Matlock Bath
- Matlock Bath War Memorial
