= Teasdale =

Teasdale is a surname. Notable people with the surname include:

- George Teasdale (1831–1907), English Mormon apostle and missionary
- Graham Teasdale (born 1955), Australian football player
- Harvey Teasdale (1817–1904), English circus clown
- John D. Teasdale, British researcher in cognition and brain therapy
- Joseph P. Teasdale (1936–2014), American politician from Missouri
- Kat Teasdale (1964–2016), Canadian auto racing driver
- Keith Teasdale (born 1954), English cricketer
- Lucille Teasdale-Corti (1929–1996), Canadian physician and aid worker
- Mike Teasdale (born 1969), Scottish footballer
- Noel Teasdale (born 1938), Australian football player
- Sara Teasdale (1884–1933), American poet
- Verree Teasdale (1903–1987), American radio and film actress
- Washington Teasdale (1830–1903), British engineer, photographer and inventor
- Wayne Teasdale (1945–2004), American Catholic monk, teacher, and activist
- William B. Teasdale (1856–1907), American lawyer, judge and politician

== Fictional characters ==
- Mrs. Gloria Teasdale, character in Duck Soup (1933 film)

== See also ==
- Teesdale (surname)
