= Angels from the Realms of Glory =

Christmas carol

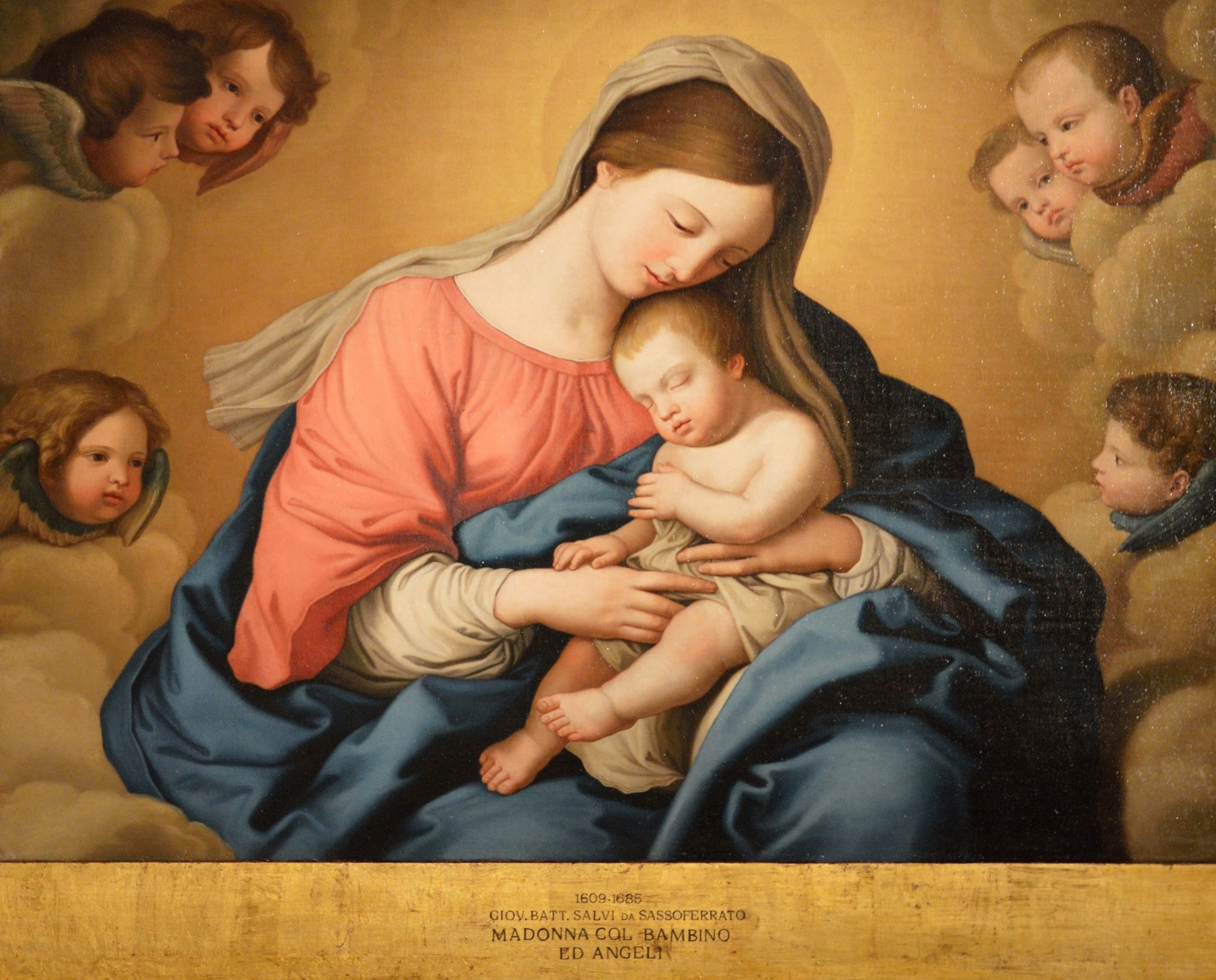
- "Madonna with child and angels" by Giovanni Battista Salvi da Sassoferrato
- Genre: Hymn
- Written: 1816
- Text: James Montgomery
- Based on: Luke 2:10
- Meter: 8.7.8.7.8.7
- Melody: "Regent Square" by Henry Smart "Les anges dans nos campagnes" (French traditional)

Angels from the Realms of Glory
The Regent Square tune for Angels from the Realms of Glory

"Angels from the Realms of Glory" is a Christmas carol written by Scottish poet and hymnwriter James Montgomery, as an adaptation of the old French hymn Les Anges dans nos campagnes. It was first printed in the Sheffield Iris on Christmas Eve 1816 under the title, The Nativity. It was then published as a hymn in Sheffield and Manchester in 1819.

== Tune ==
By 1916, the hymn had been set to more than fifty different tunes, including "St. Werbergh's" by Samuel Webbe, "Tamworth" by Charles Lockhart, "Helmsley" by Thomas Oliver, "Greenville" by Jean-Jacques Rousseau, "Regent Square" by Henry Smart, "Lewes" by John Randall, and "Wildersmouth" or "Feniton Court" by Edward Hopkins. In the United Kingdom the hymn has nowadays come to be sung invariably to the same tune as the original French carol, "Iris" (as published in the Oxford Book of Carols). A variation of this tune, "Gloria", is used for the carol "Angels We Have Heard on High". Sometimes the original "Gloria in excelsis Deo" refrain from the French carol is sung in place of Montgomery's lyric: "Come and worship Christ the new-born King".

In the United States, "Regent Square" is the most common tune for this carol. The name for the "Regent Square" tune is reportedly an association with the publisher of the first hymnal to contain it, James Hamilton, who was the minister of the Regent Square Church situated in London.

== Text ==
Angels, from the realms of glory,
Wing your flight o'er all the earth;
Ye who sang creation's story,
Now proclaim Messiah's birth:

Refrain: Come and worship,
Come and worship
Worship Christ, the newborn King.

Shepherds, in the fields abiding,
Watching o'er your flocks by night,
God with man is now residing,
Yonder shines the infant light:

Refrain.

Sages, leave your contemplations,
Brighter visions beam afar;
Seek the great Desire of nations,
Ye have seen his natal star:

Refrain.

Saints before the altar bending,
Watching long in hope and fear,
Suddenly the Lord, descending,
In his temple shall appear.

Refrain.

Sinners, wrung with true repentance,
Doomed for guilt to endless pains,
Justice now revokes the sentence,
Mercy calls you—break your chains:

Refrain.

Though an infant now we view him,
He shall fill his Father's throne,
Gather all the nations to him;
Every knee shall then bow down:

Refrain.

All creation, join in praising
God the Father, Spirit, Son,
Evermore your voices raising,
To th'eternal Three in One:

Refrain.

== Text of Les Anges dans nos campagnes (1805 version, stanzas 1–4 of 12) ==
J'Entends, là sur ces collines,
Les Anges descendus des Cieux,
Chanter d'une voix divine
Ce Cantique mélodieux,
Gloria in excelsis Deo.

Bergers, pourquoi cette Fête?
Quel est l'objet de tous ces chants?
Quel vainqueur, quelle conquête
Mérite ces cris triomphans?
Gloria, etc.

Vous serait-elle inconnue!
N'attendez-vous pas un Sauveur?
C'est son heureuse venue,
Qui nous fait dire avec ardeur,
Gloria, etc.

Ils annoncent la naissance
Du Libérateur d'Israël.
Et plein de reconnaissance
Chantent en ce jour solemnel
Gloria, etc.

== See also ==
- List of Christmas carols
