= Sheffield General Cemetery =

Cemetery in Sheffield, South Yorkshire, England

Coordinates: 53°22′9″N 1°29′14″W

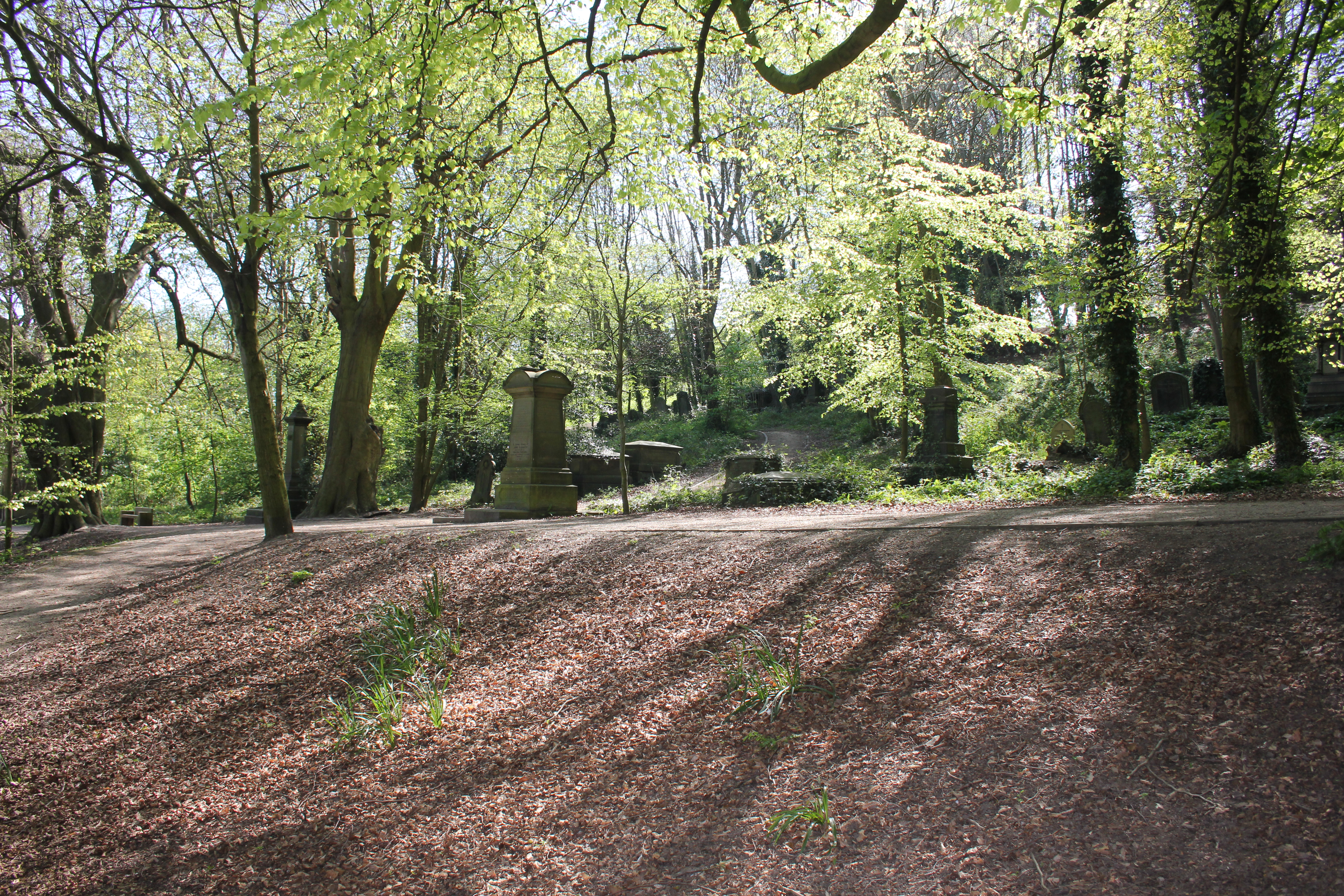
Sandford's Walk at Sheffield General Cemetery

The General Cemetery in the City of Sheffield, England, opened in 1836 and closed for burial in 1978. It was the principal cemetery in Victorian Sheffield with over 87,000 burials. Today it is a listed Landscape (Grade II*) on the English Heritage National Register of Historic Parks and Gardens. It is also a Local Nature Reserve. It is owned by the City of Sheffield and managed on behalf of the city by a local community group, the Sheffield General Cemetery Trust.

== Location ==
The General Cemetery (grid reference SK342859) is located just over a mile to the south-west of Sheffield city centre, in the district of Sharrow. It occupies a north-facing hillside site between Sharrow Vale and Sharrow Head. The Porter Brook runs along its north-west edge, and Cemetery Road forms the boundary to the south-east. The Gatehouse entrance is accessed from Cemetery Avenue off Ecclesall Road.

== History ==
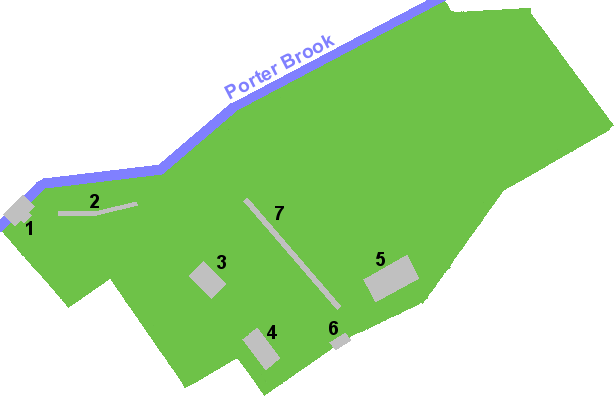

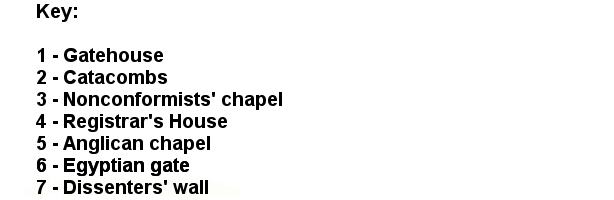

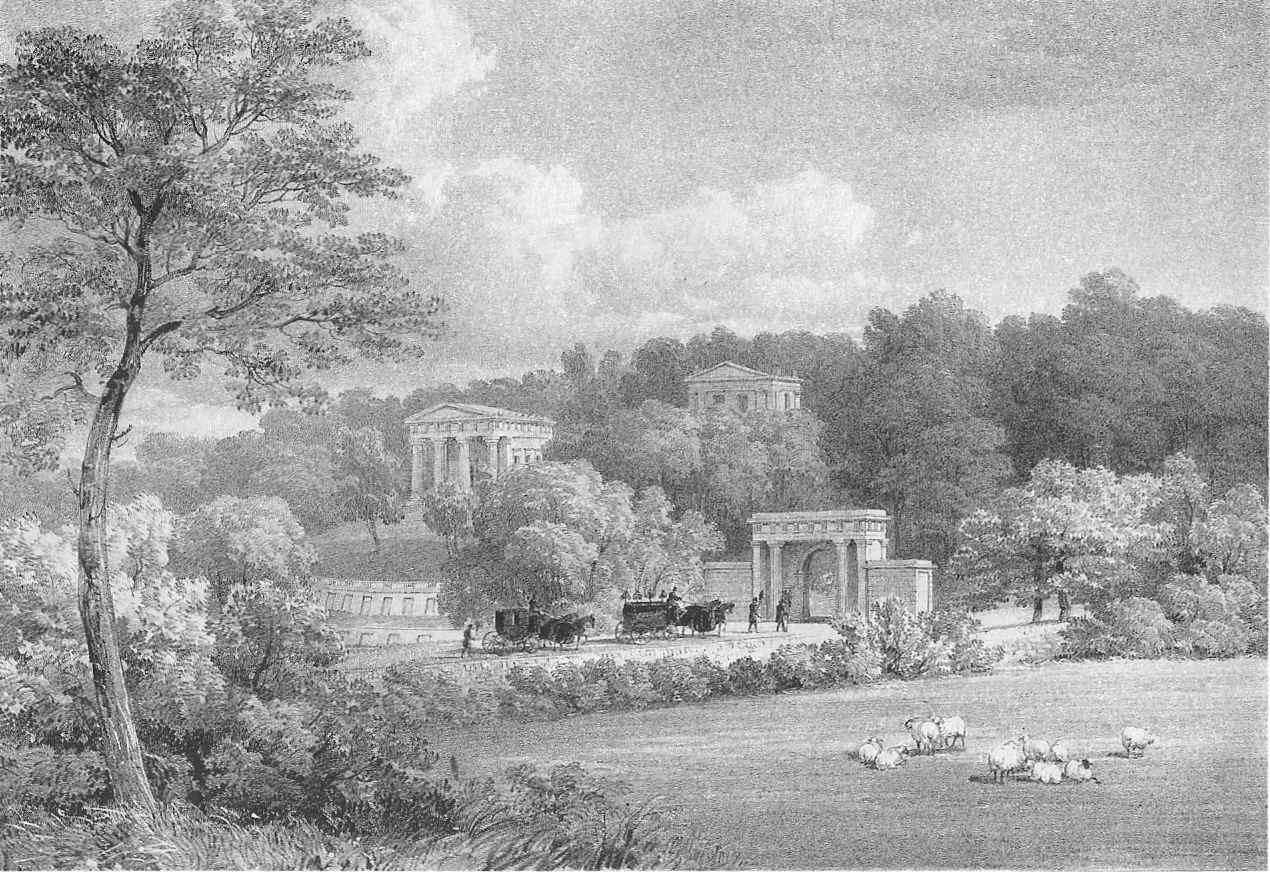
The Cemetery in the 1830s, seen from Ecclesall Road

The General Cemetery was one of the first commercial landscape cemeteries in Britain. Its opening in 1836 as a Nonconformist cemetery was a response to the rapid growth of Sheffield and the relatively poor state of the town's churchyards. This garden cemetery, with its Greek Doric and Egyptian style buildings, was designed by Sheffield architect Samuel Worth on the site of a former quarry. Robert Marnock who also designed Sheffield Botanical Gardens (1836) and Weston Park (1873) acted as a landscape consultant for this initial phase. The first burial was of Mary Ann Fish, a victim of tuberculosis. An Anglican cemetery with a chapel designed by William Flockton and a landscape laid out by Robert Marnock was consecrated alongside the Nonconformist cemetery in 1846—the wall that divided the unconsecrated and consecrated ground can still be seen today. By 1916 the cemetery was rapidly filling up and running out of space, burials in family plots continued through the 1950s and 1960s but the cemeteries' fortunes were waning. In 1962 a development company purchased majority shares in the site, aiming to build housing on it, but their plan was defeated by local opposition and legal difficulties. The thwarted developers left the site to neglect, and eventually agreed to give ownership to Sheffield City Council in the 1970s. The council had previously declined an offer to purchase from the cemeteries original owners, but now accepted that something had to be done. The site was officially closed to new burials in 1979, and in 1980 the council obtained permission by Act of Parliament to clear 7,800 gravestones in the Anglican cemetery to make a 'recreation area' Having been neglected for decades, some memorials were in need of maintenance and removing the entire collection was a cheaper solution, with occupants left in situ. Before removing the gravestones the Council documented the epitaph information and photographed the site. The older Non-Conformist tombs were considered of more historical importance and so spared, with the broken-up Anglican gravestones used as paving, path-edging, and filler, as 2023 renovations to the catacomb revealed.

Through the 1980s and 1990s most of the rest of the cemetery was left untouched, the Council designating it a Conservation Area in 1986. But it was also neglected; an overgrown sanctuary for wildlife but also prone to vandalism and suffering from lack of maintenance, memorials and buildings falling into disrepair. Concerned local residents formed The Friends of the General Cemetery in 1989, which became Sheffield General Cemetery Trust.

In early 2003 work began to restore the gatehouse and catacombs funded by a £500,000 grant from the Heritage Lottery Fund. The restored gatehouse now houses the offices of the Sheffield General Cemetery Trust. In October 2021 the Trust opened an Airbnb in part of the Gatehouse to raise money for its ongoing conservation aims.

2023 saw the completion of a substantial restoration project in the General Cemetery, providing sympathetic repairs to catacombs and other integral structures, with added enhancements of wheel-chair accessible paths, information boards, seating, and lighting. The historical site has become a recognised visitor attraction, hosting regular tours relating to various themes; local-history, flora, prominent-burials, astronomy, and wildlife, including bat-Walks. The Grade II listed non-conformist chapel was restored, re-named The Samuel Worth Chapel after its architect, and resurrected as a unique venue for music, art, and weddings, ensuring the cemetery a new lease of life in the community.

== Notable buildings and structures ==
- The Gatehouse (Grade II* listed) is built directly over the Porter Brook in a Classical architectural style with Egyptian features. The gateway itself resembles a Roman arch. It was possibly built over the river so that entering the cemetery was symbolic of the crossing of the river Styx in Greek mythology.
- The Egyptian Gate (Grade II* listed) forms the upper entrance to the cemetery on Cemetery Road. It is richly ornamented and possesses gates bearing ouroboros, two coiled snakes holding their tails in their mouths.
- The Nonconformist chapel (Grade II* listed) is built in a classical style with Egyptian features. The sculpted panel above the door shows a dove, representing the Holy Ghost or the Holy Spirit. Stone steps lead down to a wall with catacomb-like entrances. Work to restore the chapel started in 2014, with the building - now called the Samuel Worth Chapel - opening in 2016 as an events and activity space.

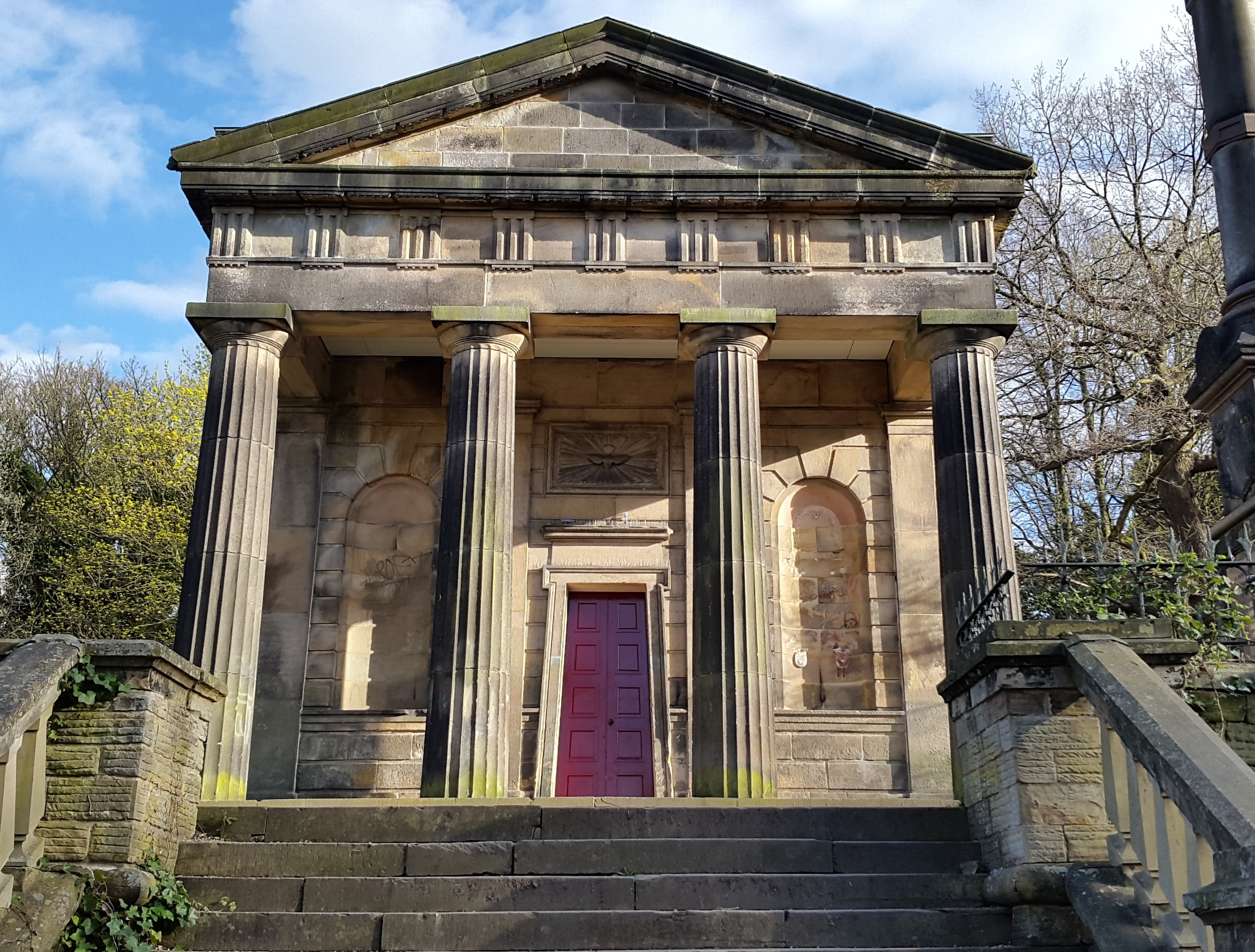

- The Anglican chapel (added in 1850; Grade II listed). Designed in the Neo-Gothic style by William Flockton. Unlike the other buildings in the cemetery, the chapel was built in Gothic style rather than Classical or Egyptian. The building is distinctive in style due to its ogival windows, the porte-cochere and the spire. The spire is indeed far too big for the rest of the building, built purposely so that it would be seen from afar.

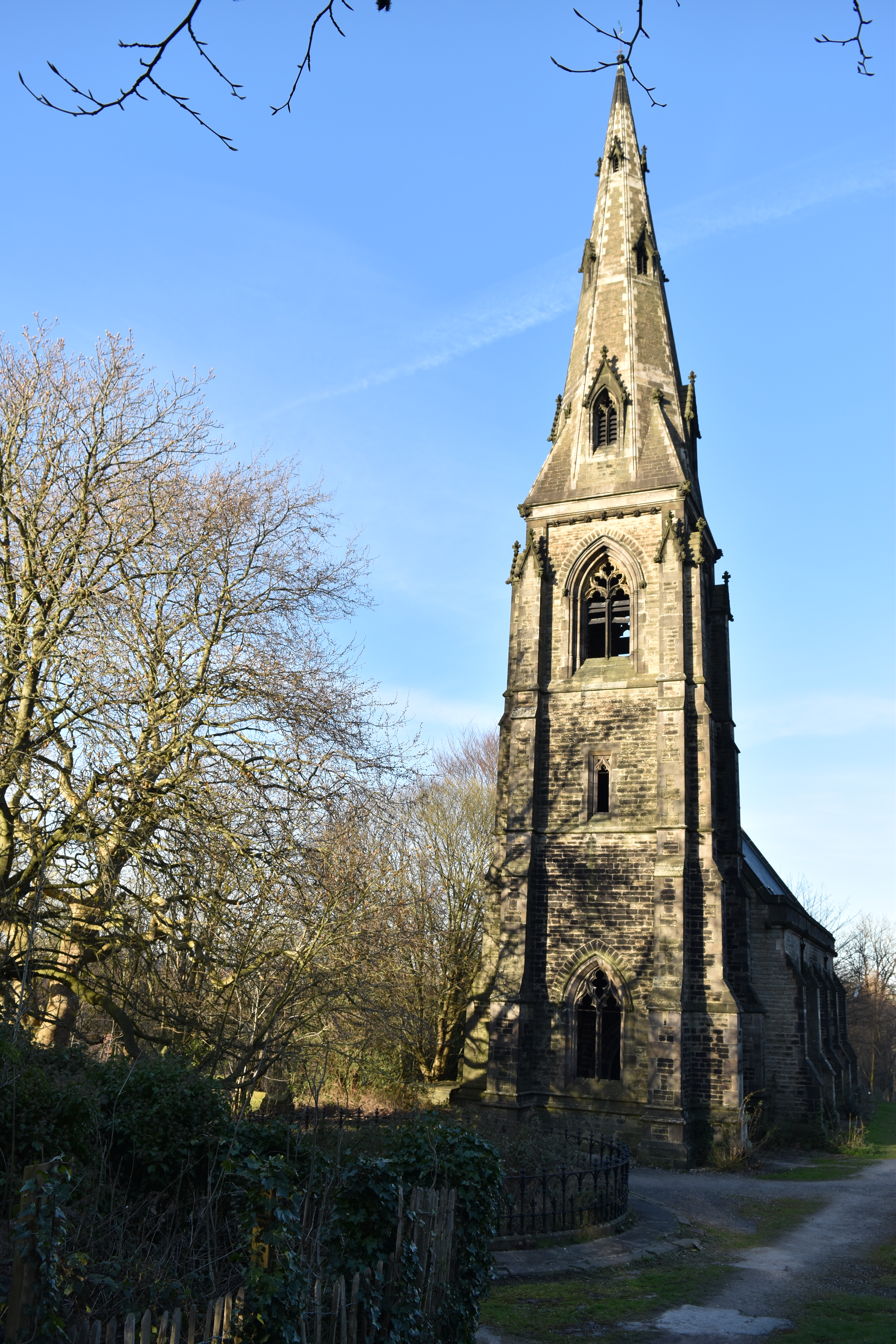

- The Registrar's house (Grade II listed)
- The Catacombs. There are two rows of catacombs built into the hillside, this method of burial was unpopular and only ten bodies were laid to rest in the catacombs in the first 10 years.
- The Dissenters' Wall was built between 1848 and 1850. It divided the older Nonconformist part of the cemetery from the consecrated Anglican ground. The wall runs almost uninterrupted, from the perimeter wall on Cemetery Road to the path beside the Porter Brook at the bottom of the cemetery.

== Notable burials ==
- George Bassett (1818–1886). Founder of The Bassett Company – the company that invented Liquorice Allsorts. Mayor of Sheffield (1876).
- George Bennett (1774–1841). Founder of the Sheffield Sunday School movement. The memorial to him (c. 1850) is Grade II listed.
- John, Thomas, and Skelton Cole. Founders of Sheffield's Cole Brothers department store in 1847 – part of the John Lewis Partnership from 1940 until its closure in 2020.
- Francis Dickinson (1830–1898). One of the soldiers who fought in the Charge of the Light Brigade during the Crimean War.
- William Dronfield (1824–1891). Founder of the United Kingdom Alliance of Organised Trades, which inspired the creation of the Trades Union Congress.
- Mark Firth (1819–1880). Steel manufacturer, Master Cutler (1867), Mayor of Sheffield (1874), and founder of Firth College in 1870 (later University of Sheffield). The monument to Mark Firth is Grade II listed, the railings that surround it were made at Firth's Norfolk Works.
- William Flockton, architect.
- John Gunson (1809–1886). Chief engineer of the Sheffield Waterworks Company at the time of the collapse of Dale Dyke Dam on 11 March 1864, which resulted in the Great Sheffield Flood. Samuel Harrison, who documented the flood, and 77 of the flood's victims are also buried in the cemetery.
- Samuel Holberry (1816–1842). A leading figure in the Chartist movement.
- Mary Holberry (1816–1883). Wife of Samuel Holberry and Chartist.
- Isaac Ironside (1808–1870). Chartist and local politician.
- James Montgomery (1771–1854). Poet/Publisher. The grave and Grade II listed monument to James Montgomery, were moved to the grounds of Sheffield Cathedral in 1971.
- James Nicholson (died 1909). Prominent Sheffield industrialist. The memorial that he commissioned for himself and his family c. 1872 is Grade II listed.
- William Parker, merchant. The monument to William Parker, erected in 1837 by the merchants and manufacturers of Sheffield, is Grade II listed.
- William Prest (died 1885). Cricketer and footballer born in York, who lived most of his life in Sheffield. Co-founder of Sheffield Football club.
- Maria Gomersal (1844–1871). Operatic Singer & Actress.
- Eliza Rooke (1824–1856). Political Activist.
- Dr Attracta Rewcastle (1897–1951). Surgeon Lieutenant-Commander.
- Alice Hall (1866–1935). Children’s Author and Campaigner for Women’s Rights
- Leopold Lichtenthal (1832–1849). Young Russian who died after being thrown from horse.
- Samuel Morgan Smith (1833–1882). Famous Black Tragedian.
- Robert Fossett (1826–1875). Proprietor of Fossett’s Circus.
- Harvey Teasdale (1817–1904). Infamous Sheffield entertainer.
- Sergeant Thomas Sands (1783–1850). Sergeant in the King’s Dragoon Guards at the Battle of Waterloo.
- George Myers, Francis Dickinson, Charles Partington – Crimean War Veterans.

There are buried here also 40 service personnel of the First and Second World Wars who are commemorated by the Commonwealth War Graves Commission.
