= George Bennet (missionary) =

English missionary (1774–1841)

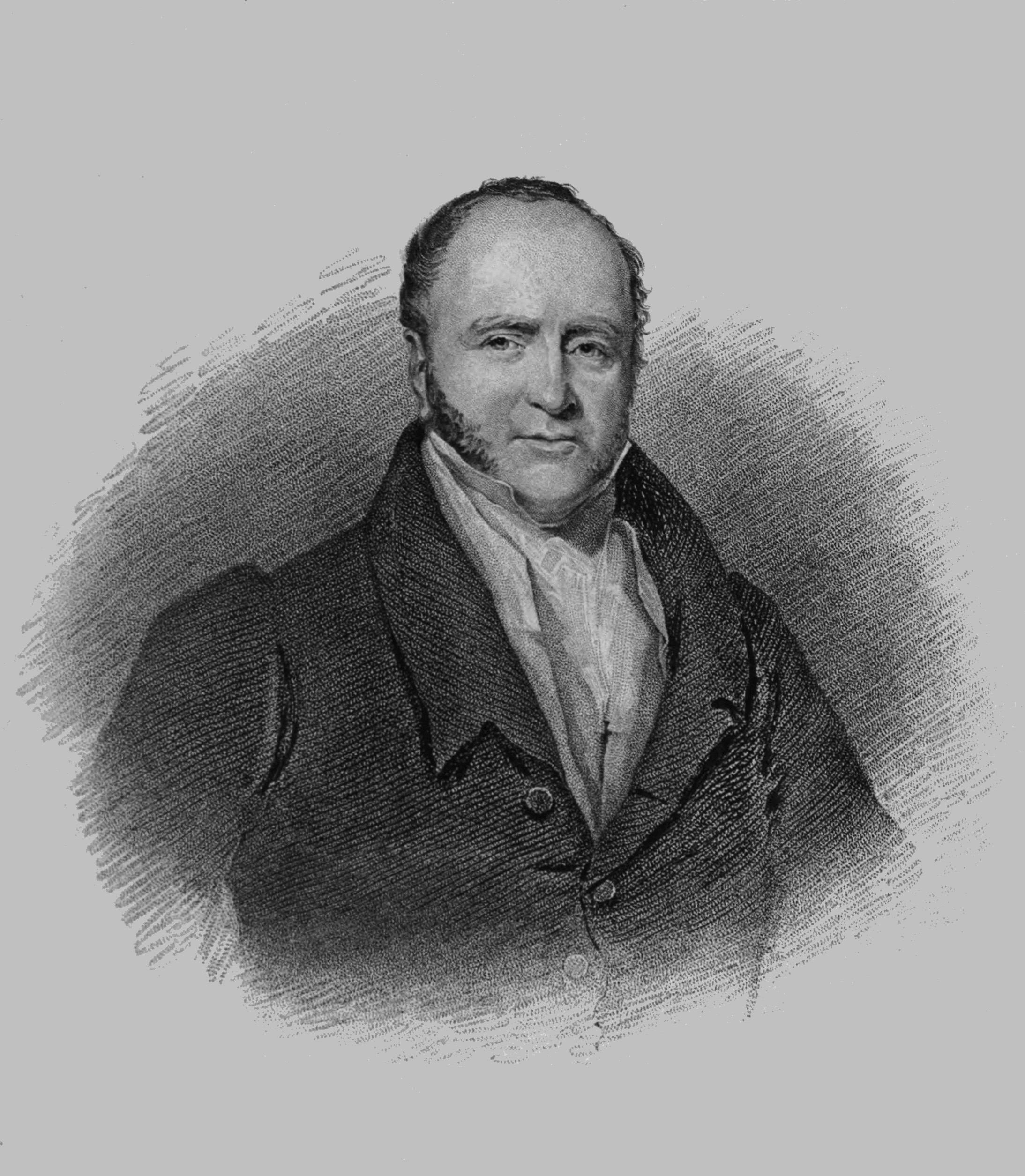
- Born: 16 April 1774
- Died: 13 November 1841 (aged 67); London, England
- Resting place: St Thomas's Square Chapel burial ground, Hackney, London
- Occupations: Missionary; philanthropist
- Known for: London Missionary Society deputation voyage, 1821–1829

George Bennet (16 April 1774 – 13 November 1841) was an English missionary from Sheffield, Yorkshire. He travelled widely in Asia.

== Life ==
Bennet was a Congregationalist organiser in Sheffield. He was also a philanthropist. In 1821 he set out with Daniel Tyerman, supported financially by the London Missionary Society. They travelled together to China, Southeast Asia, and India.

Bennet stopped in Macau during his Pacific voyage. He was impressed by the garden and aviary of opium trader Thomas Beale, devoting 45 pages of his travelogue to them. Bennet and Tyerman made an extended stay in Tahiti, and Bennet's letters from there were published in the Sheffield Iris by James Montgomery. Tyerman died in Madagascar, where they had set up missions with the support of King Radama I.

Bennet also travelled to the Sandwich Islands, New Zealand, New South Wales, Java, Singapore and Calcutta.

After his voyage, Bennet gave historical artifacts that he had collected to the London Natural History Museum. He died in London on 13 November 1841. His funeral was held at the St Thomas's Square Chapel, Hackney, and he was interred in the adjoining burial ground. There is an inscribed monument in his memory in Sheffield General Cemetery.

== See also ==
- William Ellis (missionary)
