= Daniel Tyerman =

English missionary

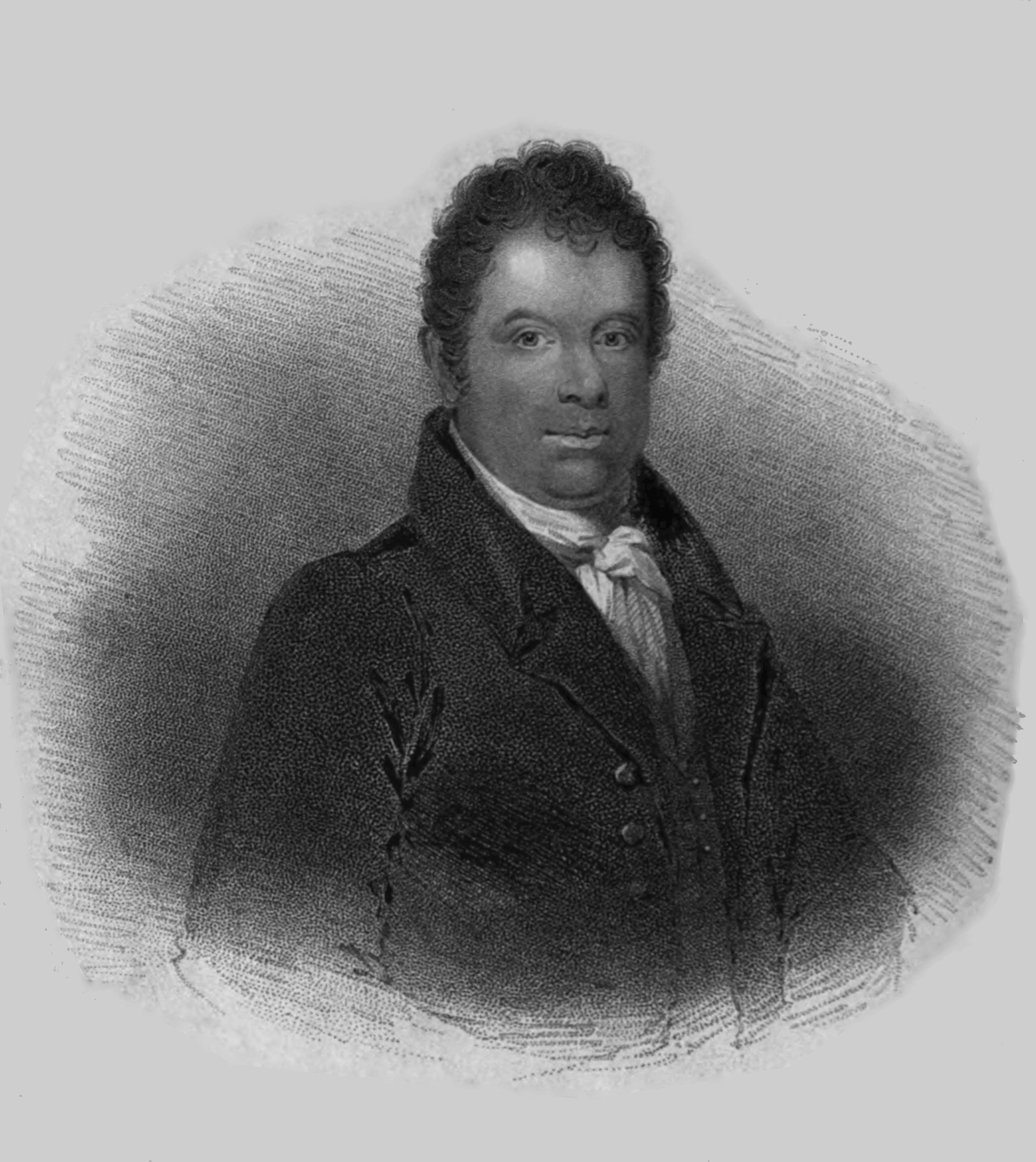
Tyerman

Daniel Tyerman (19 November 1773 – 30 July 1828) was an English missionary.

== Biography ==
Tyerman was born on 19 November 1773 at Clack farm, near Osmotherley, North Yorkshire, where his parents had resided for some time. In 1790 he obtained employment in London.

Coming under strong religious convictions, he entered Hoxton Academy in 1795 to prepare himself for the congregational ministry. In 1798 he became minister at Cawsand in Cornwall, and thence removed to Wellington in Somerset. About 1804 he officiated for a short time at Southampton, and afterwards settled at Newport in the Isle of Wight. There he was one of the first projectors of the town reading-rooms, and filled the office of secretary of the Isle of Wight Bible Society.

In 1821 Tyerman and George Bennet of Sheffield were appointed by the London Missionary Society to visit their southern stations. They sailed from London on 2 May in the whaler Tuscan, and, proceeding round Cape Horn, visited Tahiti, the Leeward and Sandwich Islands, and other mission stations in the South Seas. In 1824 they visited New South Wales, and on the way narrowly escaped from Māori in New Zealand. From Sydney, in September 1824, they sailed through the Torres Straits to Java, and thence to Singapore, Canton, and Calcutta. At Serampore, on 3 May 1826, they met the venerable William Carey, who received them with much kindness. After visiting Benares, they sailed to Madras, and thence to Goa. From India they voyaged in 1827 to Mauritius and Madagascar, where the missions were firmly established under King Radama. On 30 July 1828 Tyerman, whose health had given way under the climate of southern India, died at Antananarivo. His journals were published four years after his death.

He was twice married: first, in 1798, to Miss Rich, by whom he had a son and daughter; and, secondly, in 1810, to Miss Fletcher of Abingdon, by whom he had two sons and a daughter.

== Works ==
- "An Essay on Baptism," Newport, 1806, 12mo; 2nd edit. London, 1814, 12mo.
- "Evangelical Hope: an Essay," London, 1815, 12mo.
- "The Dairyman: the Life of Joseph Wallbridge," Newport, 1816, 12mo.
- "Essay on the Wisdom of God," London, 1818, 8vo. The journal of his missionary tour was published by James Montgomery, the poet, in 1831, London, 8vo (2nd edit. 1841). The first part was written in conjunction with George Bennet, but the latter part was entirely his own. It affords a graphic picture of the state of the London society's missions at the period.

== See also ==
William Ellis (missionary)
