= Samuel Holberry =

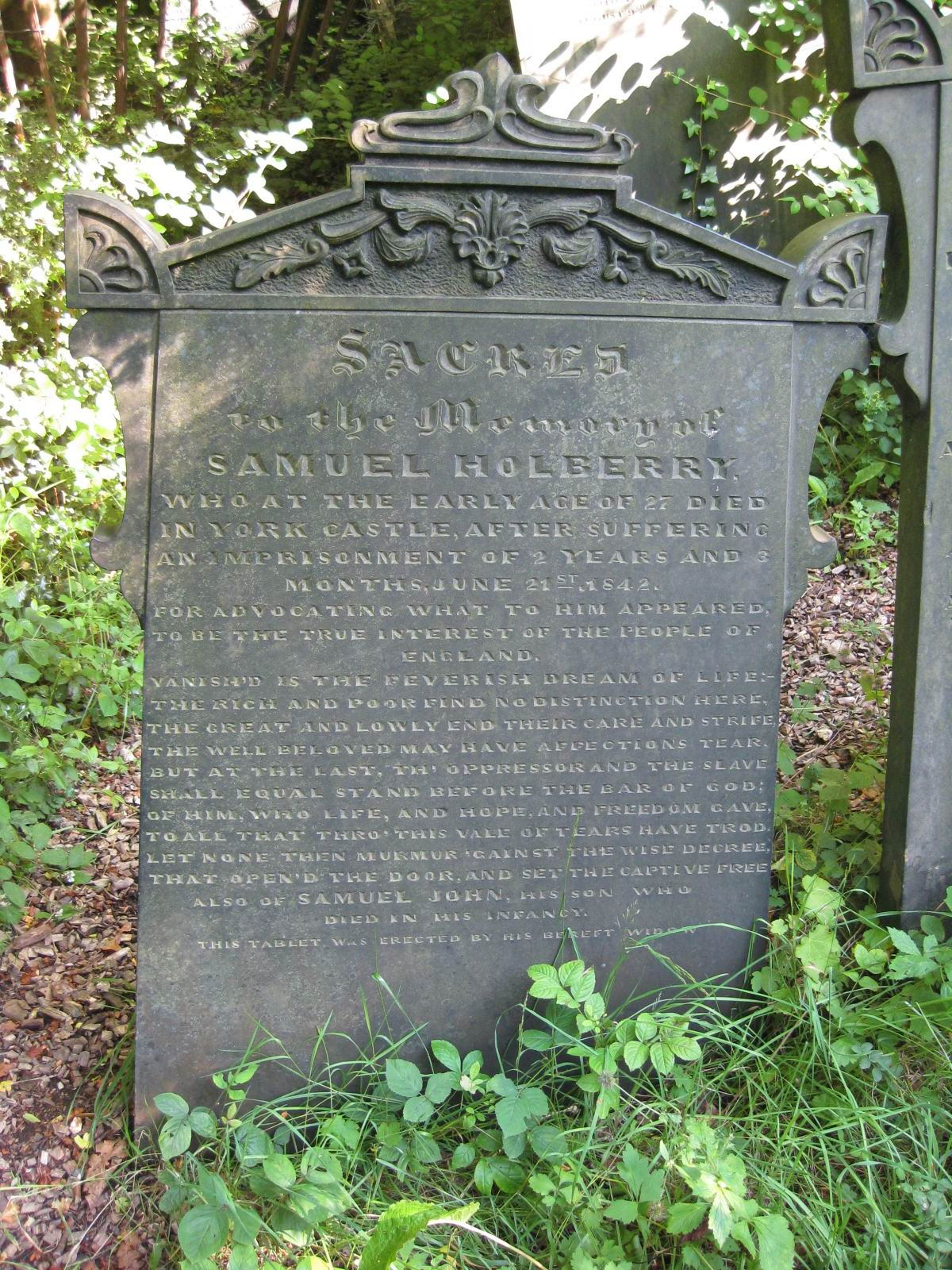
The grave of Holberry in Sheffield General Cemetery.

Samuel Holberry (18 November 1814 – 21 June 1842) was a prominent Chartist activist.

== Early years ==
Holberry was born in Gamston, Nottinghamshire, the youngest of 9 children. In 1832 he joined the British army, leaving in 1835 and moving to Sheffield, where he began working as a distiller, and married Mary Cooper (22 October 1838).

Together with other activists campaigning to extend the political rights given by the Reform Act 1832, he engaged in a number of peaceful protests. After a rebellion in Newport, Monmouthshire now known as the Newport Rising was put down in 1839, then Samuel and a group of conspirators planned a Sheffield Rising.

== Radical Chartism ==
The groups began to organise a militia, and supposedly "provided themselves with arms, and fixed upon a plan for taking some, and firing other parts of the town. That they had agreed to strike down every policeman and watchman that they might meet, and catch the soldiers before they could fire upon them. The barracks were to be fired, and the insurgents were to possess themselves of the Town Hall and Tontine, which they were to defend with the barricades."

The plot was exposed by the landlord of a pub in Rotherham who had infiltrated the group. Leaders were identified, and both Samuel and Mary were arrested. In contrast to many members of the group, Samuel freely admitted that he had aimed to upset the Government and was willing to die for the Charter. He was convicted of conspiracy to riot and sedition and was sentenced to four years' imprisonment. Placed in Northallerton House of Correction, he was illegally put on the treadwheel.

== Death in prison ==
In gaol, Samuel developed consumption and died after being transferred to York Castle. He was buried in Sheffield General Cemetery, 50,000 people attending his funeral.

== Commemoration ==
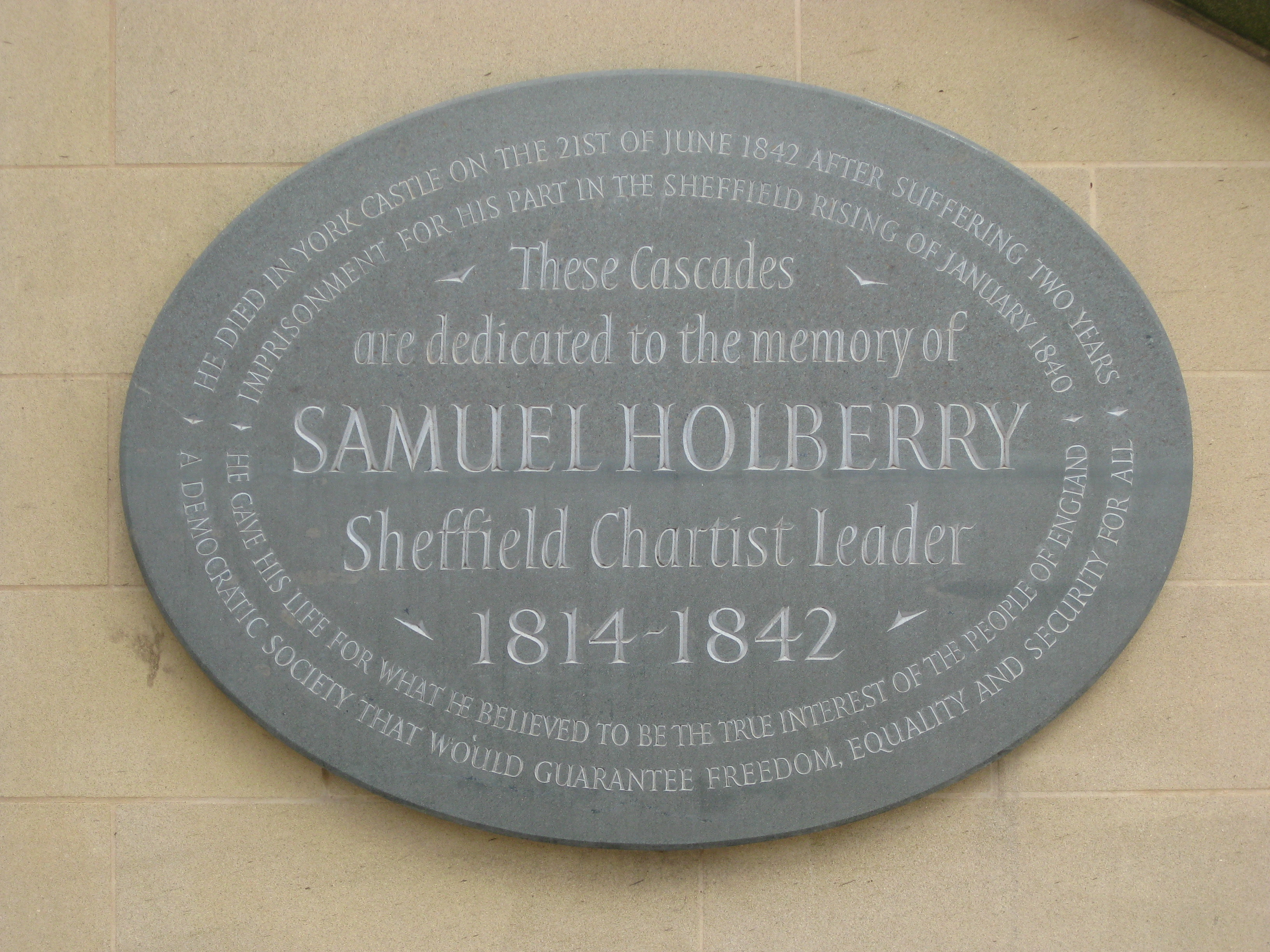
Plaque in the Sheffield Peace Gardens

In the 1980s, Sheffield City Council commemorated Holberry by naming a fountain in the Peace Gardens for him. This was removed during renovations and replaced by the "Holberry Cascades".
