= John Pye-Smith =

English theologian (1774–1851)

The Reverend John Pye-Smith FRS FGS
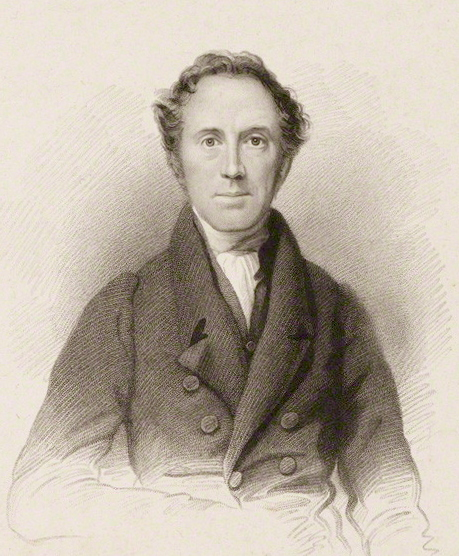
- Born: 25 May 1774; Sheffield, Yorkshire, England
- Died: 5 February 1851 (aged 76); Hackney, Middlesex, England
- Occupations: Congregational theologian and author
- Theological work
- Language: English
- Main interests: Reconciling geological sciences with the Bible, repealing the Corn Laws and abolishing slavery

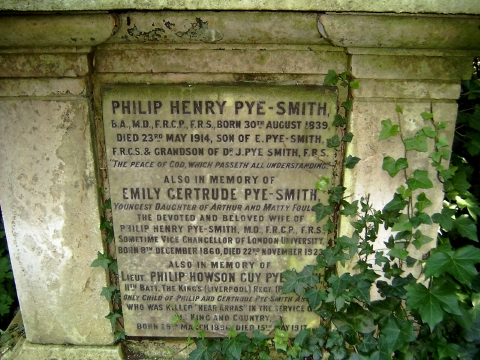
Family tomb of the Pye Smiths at Abney Park Cemetery, showing inscriptions of other family members

John Pye-Smith FRS FGS (25 May 1774 – 5 February 1851) was a Congregational minister, theologian and tutor, associated with reconciling geological sciences with the Bible, repealing the Corn Laws and abolishing slavery. He was the author of many learned works.

== Biography ==
The son of a Sheffield bookseller, Pye-Smith was surrounded by books in his youth and was practically self-taught: he did take Latin lessons from Jehoiada Brewer. He became a Dissenting academic and author, and was the first Fellow of the Royal Society from a Nonconformist background. He was also elected a Fellow of the Geological Society at a time when there was considerable debate about accepting the idea of geological time, and if so to find ways of reconciling this with the teachings of the Old Testament. He was an advocate of gap creationism.

Throughout his life he worked for the abolition of slavery. During the politically turbulent 1790s, Pye-Smith took over the editorship of the Sheffield Iris, the leading abolitionist newspaper in the North of England, during the imprisonment of its editor, his friend James Montgomery. In 1830 Pye-Smith took the Chair of the Board of Congregational Ministers when it passed an anti-slavery motion to secure support from all Congregational chapels across the country in petitioning parliament: "That we feel it to be a solemn duty to employ our influence with our congregations and the public, to promote petitions to both Houses of Parliament for the abolition of Colonial Slavery, and therefore pledge ourselves, and beg to recommend to our brethren throughout the kingdom to prepare from each congregation such petitions to parliament..." The Congregationalists' 1833 abolition lecture, "The Sinfulness of Colonial Slavery", was delivered at John Pye-Smith's Meeting House in Hackney by his former pupil, Robert Halley.

== Work in education and theological training ==
A committee of Nonconformist merchants and ministers, including Pye-Smith, founded Mill Hill School. for boys on 25 January 1807.

Pye-Smith was the theological tutor at the Dissenting academy known as Homerton College near Hackney, London for forty-five years between 1805 and 1850. His pupils included Robert Halley, future Principal of New College, London; Samuel Dyer, the missionary; and William Johnson Fox of the South Place Chapel, later the South Place Ethical Society.

Pye-Smith was minister of the Old Gravel Pit Chapel in Chatham Place, Hackney for nearly as long, from 1811 to 1850. One of the congregation members at Hackney was Mary Ann Aldersey.

== Monument ==
John Pye Smith died in Hackney in 1851 and is buried below a marble chest tomb monument in Dr Watts' Walk, at the Congregationalists' non-denominational garden cemetery in the grounds of Abney Park, Stoke Newington, north London.

He was the grandfather of Philip Henry Pye-Smith.

== Publications ==
- John Pye Smith, The Scripture Testimony to the Messiah: An Inquiry, With a View to a Satisfactory Determination of the Doctrine Taught in the Holy Scriptures Concerning the Person of Christ at Google Books (full download), 3rd ed., 3 vols. London: Jackson and Walford, 1837
- John Pye Smith, On the relation between the Holy Scriptures and some parts of geological science at Google Books (full download). London: Jackson and Walford, 1840
- John Pye Smith, Four discourses on the sacrifice and priesthood of Jesus Christ, and the Atonement and Redemption thence accruing at Google Books (full download). London: Jackson and Walford, 1842

Media offices
Preceded by James Montgomery	Editor of the Sheffield Iris; 1796	Succeeded by James Montgomery
