= James Montgomery (poet) =

Scottish-born hymnist (1771–1854)

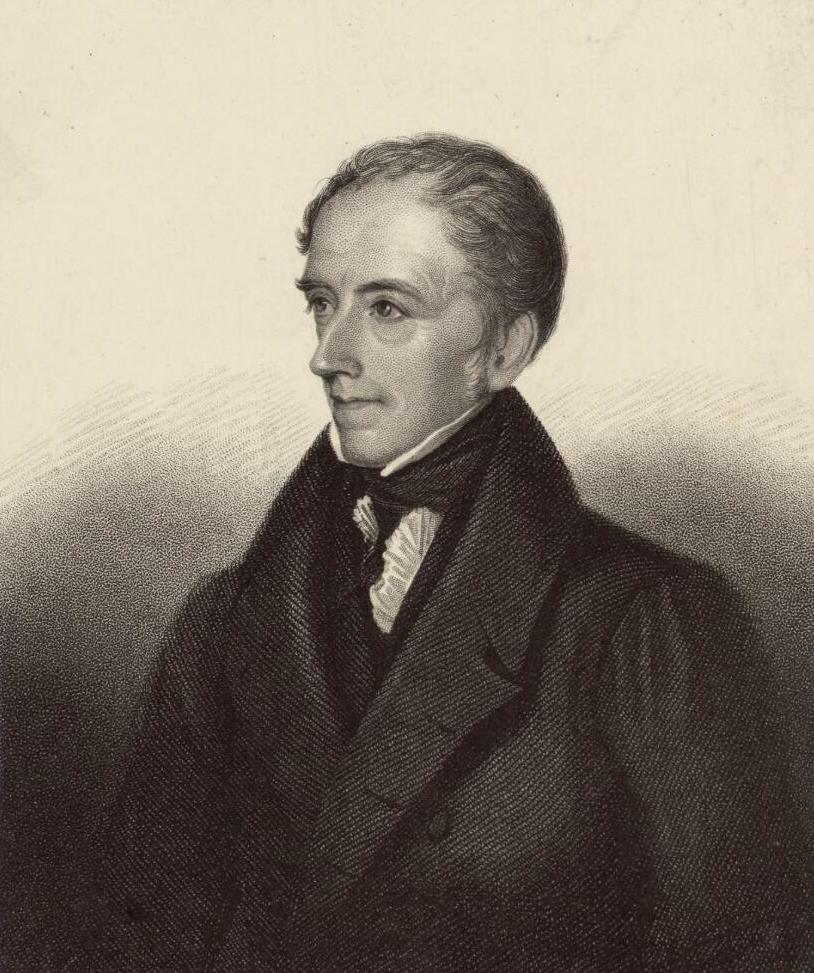
- James Montgomery, 1855
- Born: 4 November 1771; Irvine, North Ayrshire, Scotland
- Died: 30 April 1854 (aged 82); Sheffield
- Occupation: Poet / Newspaper editor
- Writing career
- Language: English
- Genre: Poetry

James Montgomery (4 November 1771 – 30 April 1854) was a Scottish-born hymn writer, poet and editor, who eventually settled in Sheffield. He was raised in the Moravian Church and theologically trained there, so that his writings often reflect concern for humanitarian causes, such as the abolition of slavery and the exploitation of child chimney sweeps.

== Early life and poetry ==
Montgomery was born at Irvine in south-west Scotland, the son of a pastor and missionary of the Moravian Brethren. He was sent to be trained for the ministry at the Moravian School at Fulneck, near Leeds, while his parents left for the West Indies, where both died within a year of each other. At Fulneck, secular studies were banned, but James still found means of borrowing and reading a good deal of poetry and made ambitious plans to write epics of his own.

On failing to complete his schooling, Montgomery was apprenticed to a baker in Mirfield, then to a store-keeper at Wath-upon-Dearne. After further efforts, including an unsuccessful attempt at a literary career in London, he moved north again to Sheffield in 1792 as an assistant to Joseph Gales, auctioneer, bookseller and printer of the Sheffield Register, who introduced him into the local Lodge of Oddfellows, to which he later addressed a song. In 1794, Gales left England to avoid political prosecution and Montgomery took the paper in hand, changing its name to the Sheffield Iris.

These were times of political repression. Montgomery was twice imprisoned on charges of sedition, first in 1795 for printing a poem to celebrate the fall of the Bastille in revolutionary France, and secondly in 1796 for criticising a magistrate for forcibly dispersing a political protest in Sheffield. Turning his jail experiences to some profit, he then published a pamphlet of poems written during his captivity: Prison Amusements (1797). His later prose account of the period appeared in 1840.

For some time the Iris was the only newspaper in Sheffield, but beyond an ability to produce fairly creditable articles from week to week, Montgomery lacked the journalistic skills to take full advantage of his position. Other newspapers arose to fill the place which his might have held and in 1825 he sold out to a local bookseller, John Blackwell.

Meanwhile, Montgomery continued to write poetry. He achieved some fame with The Wanderer of Switzerland (1806), a poem in six parts written in seven-syllable cross-rhymed quatrains. It addressed the French annexation of Switzerland and quickly went through two editions. When it was denounced the following year in the conservative Edinburgh Review as a poem that would be speedily forgotten, Lord Byron came to its defence in the satire English Bards and Scotch Reviewers. Nevertheless, within 18 months a fourth impression of 1500 copies was issued from the very presses that had printed the criticism, and several more would follow. This success brought Montgomery a commission from the printer Bowyer to write a poem on the abolition of the slave trade, to be published with other poems on the subject by Elizabeth Benger and James Grahame in a handsome illustrated volume. The subject appealed to the poet's philanthropic enthusiasm and his own family associations with the West Indies. The four-part poem in heroic couplets appeared in 1809 as The West Indies.

Montgomery also used heroic couplets for The World before the Flood (1812), a piece of historical reconstruction in ten cantos. He then turned to attacking the lottery in Thoughts on Wheels (1817) and took up the cause of chimney sweeps' apprentices in The Climbing Boys' Soliloquies. His next major poem was Greenland (1819) in five cantos of heroic couplets. It was prefaced by a description of the ancient Moravian church, its 18th-century revival and its mission to Greenland in 1733. The poem was noted for the beauty of its descriptions:

The moon is watching in the sky; the stars
Are swiftly wheeling on their golden cars;
Ocean, outstretcht with infinite expanse,
Serenely slumbers in a glorious trance;
The tide, o'er which no troubled spirits breathe,
Reflects a cloudless firmament beneath,
Where poised as in the centre of a sphere
A ship above and ship below appear;
A double image pictured on the deep,
The vessel o’er its shadow seems to sleep;
Yet, like the host of heaven, that never rest,
With evanescent motion to the west,
The pageant glides through loneliness and night,
And leaves behind a rippling wake of light.

— Canto 1, lines 1-14

== Later career ==
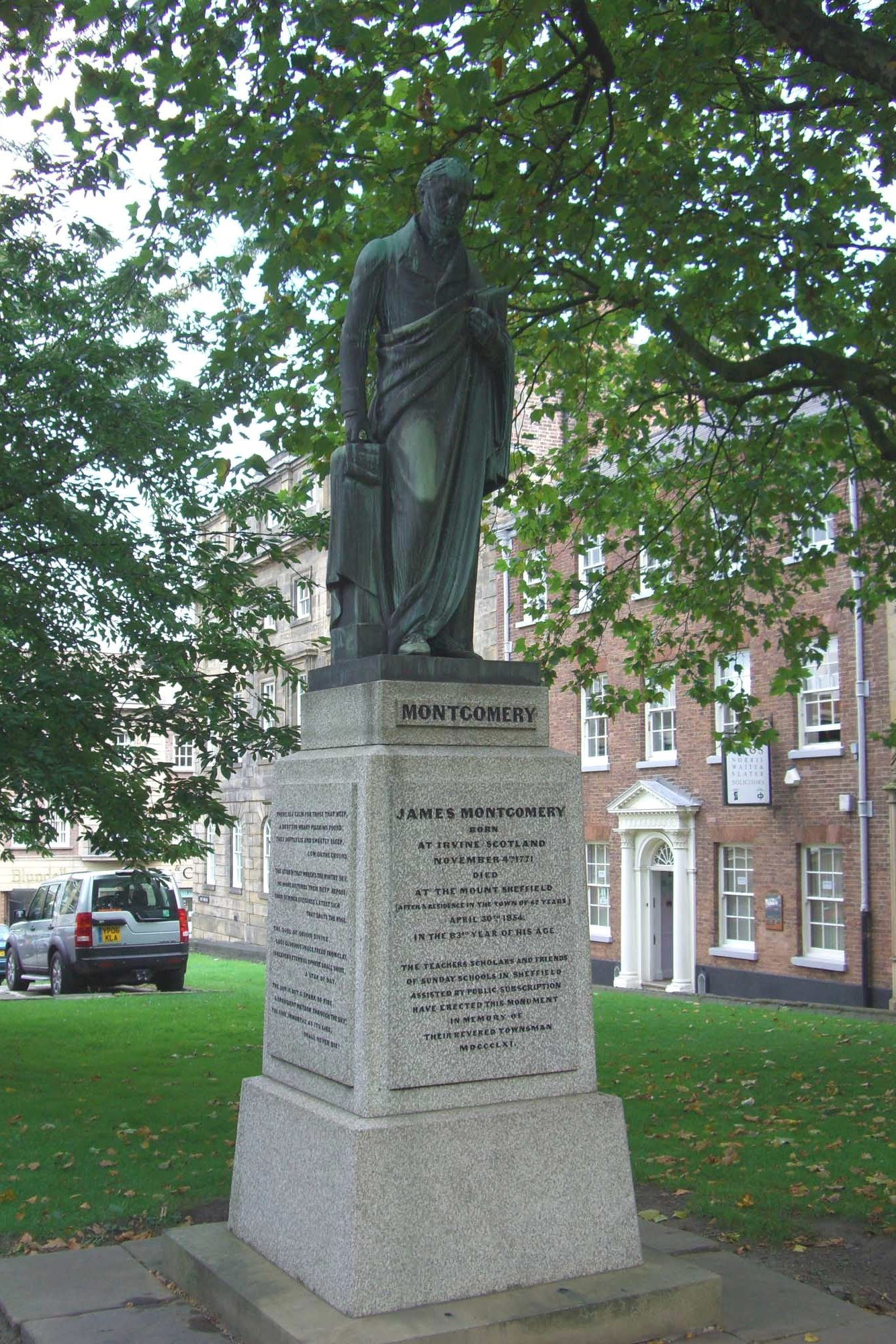
The statue of James Montgomery on the Sheffield Cathedral forecourt

Montgomery's only other long poem, after retiring from newspaper editorship, was The Pelican Island (1828): nine cantos of descriptive blank verse, which garnered mixed responses, ranging between the summarily dismissive and Blackwood's Magazine's "the best of all Montgomery's poems: in idea the most original, in execution the most powerful."

Montgomery himself expected that his name would live, if at all, in his hymns. Some of these, such as "Hail to the Lord's Anointed", "Prayer is the Soul's Sincere Desire", "According to Thy Gracious Word", "Stand up and Bless the Lord" and the carol "Angels from the Realms of Glory", are still sung today. "The Lord Is My Shepherd" is a popular hymn with many denominations, based on Psalm 23. "A Poor Wayfaring Man of Grief" has been adopted as a favourite in the Latter Day Saint movement. The earliest of his hymns dates from his days in Wath on Dearne and he added to their number over the years. The main boost came when the Rev. James Cotterill arrived at the parish church St Paul's, a chapel of ease to St Peter's, Sheffield's only parish church, in 1817.

Cotterill had compiled and published A Selection of Psalms and Hymns Adapted to the Services of the Church of England in 1810, but to his disappointment and concern he found that his new parishioners did not take kindly to using it. He therefore enlisted the help of James Montgomery to help him revise the collection and improve it by adding some hymns of the poet's own composition. This new edition, meeting with the approval of the Archbishop of York (and eventually of the parishioners at St Paul's), was finally published in 1820. In 1822 Montgomery published his own Songs of Zion: Being Imitations of Psalms, the first of several more collections of hymns. During his life he composed some 400 hymns, although less than a hundred of them are commonly sung today.

Montgomery later compiled and published the journals of Daniel Tyerman after his death during a missionary voyage with George Bennet. The account was originally published from London in a two-volume format in 1831, with the title Journal of voyages and travels by the Rev. Daniel Tyerman and George Bennet, Esq., deputed from the London Missionary Society to visit their various stations in the South Sea Islands, Australia, China, India, &c [Madagascar, and South Africa] between the years 1821 and 1829, and a revised second edition followed in 1840. This also contained a short chapter on African slavery.

From 1835 until his death, Montgomery lived at The Mount in Glossop Road, Sheffield. He was well regarded in the city and played an active part in its philanthropy and religious life. He died on 30 April 1854, was honoured by a public funeral, and buried in Sheffield General Cemetery. He had remained unmarried.

== Legacy ==
In 1861, a monument designed by John Bell (1811–1895) was erected over his grave in the Sheffield cemetery at a cost of £1000, raised by public subscription on the initiative of the Sheffield Sunday School Union, of which he was among the founding members. On its granite pedestal is inscribed: "Here lies interred, beloved by all who knew him, the Christian poet, patriot, and philanthropist. Wherever poetry is read, or Christian hymns sung, in the English language, 'he being dead, yet speaketh' by the genius, piety and taste embodied in his writings." There are also extracts from his poems "Prayer" and "The Grave". After the statue fell into disrepair it was moved in 1971 to the precincts of Sheffield Cathedral, where there is also a memorial window to him.

Elsewhere in Sheffield there are various streets named after Montgomery, as is a Grade II-listed drinking fountain on Broad Lane. The Surrey Street meeting hall of the Sunday Schools Union (now known as The Montgomery) was named in his honour in 1886. It houses a 420-seat theatre, which also bears his name. Elsewhere, Wath-upon-Dearne, flattered by being called "the queen of villages" in his work, has repaid the compliment by naming after him a community hall, a street and a square. His birthplace in Irvine was renamed Montgomery House after he had paid the town a return visit in 1841, but it has since been demolished.

== Other works ==
- Montgomery, James (1816). Verses to the memory of the late Richard Reynolds, of Bristol.
- Poetical Works, four editions in 1821, 1836, 1841, and 1854
- Editor: The Chimney-Sweeper's Friend and Climbing-Boy's Album, London: Longman, Hurst, Rees, Orme, Brown and Green, 1824
- Editor: The Christian Psalmist; or, Hymns, Selected and Original, Glasgow: Chalmers and Collins, 1825. sixth edn. 1829; Read Books, 2008, ISBN 9781409799900
- Editor: The Christian poet; or, selections in verse on sacred subjects, Wm Collins, Glasgow, 1825
- An Essay on the Phrenology of the Hindoos and Negroes, London: Printed for E. Lloyd, 1829
- Original Hymns For Public, Private, and Social Devotion, London: Longman, Brown, Green, 1853
- Sacred Poems and Hymns: For Public and Private Devotion. D. Appleton. 1854.
- Prose by a Poet, 2 vols, London: Longman, Hurst, Rees, Orme, Brown and Green, 1824
- Montgomery, James (1833). Lectures on poetry and general literature.
- A practical detail of the cotton manufacture of the United States of America: and the state of the cotton manufacture of that country contrasted and compared with that of Great Britain; with comparative estimates of the cost of manufacturing in both countries ... J. Niven. 1840.
- Voyages and travels round the world by the Rev. Daniel Tyerman and George Bennet, Esq. : deputed from the London Missionary Society to visit their various stations in the South Sea Islands, Australia, China, India, Madagascar, and South Africa, between the years 1821 and 1829

Media offices
Preceded by Joseph Gales	Editor of the Sheffield Iris; 1794–1796	Succeeded by John Pye-Smith
Preceded by John Pye-Smith	Editor of the Sheffield Iris; 1796–1825	Succeeded by John Holland
