= Teesdale (surname) =

Teesdale is a surname, and may refer to:

- Christopher Teesdale (1833–1893), South African general
- Edmund Brinsley Teesdale (1915–1997), British colonial administrator in Hong Kong
- Frederick Teesdale (1864–1931), Australian politician
- Hugh Teesdale (1886–1971), English cricketer
- Jess Teesdale, Australian politician
- Sylvester Teesdale (born 1983), Trinidadian footballer

== See also ==
- Teasdale
