= Harvey Teasdale =

British entertainer (1817–1904)

Harvey Teasdale (1817–1904) was a Victorian performer best known for his success as the 'man-monkey' stage character.

Teasdale was born in Sheffield to a family of cutlers. He performed several times as the clown in pantomimes and harlequinades before cultivating a reputation for playing the 'man-monkey'. Teasdale toured the United Kingdom with this act with much success. His most famous stunt was his attempt to sail down the River Don, Sheffield, in a barrel pulled by ducks. As well as performing, Teasdale managed several theatres.

In 1862, Teasdale's wife, Sarah, separated from him, taking their two daughters with her. Teasdale discovered Sarah's whereabouts and attacked her with an empty pistol before a neighbour intervened. He was convicted of attempted murder and served two years in Wakefield Prison (1862-1864).

Teasdale came out of prison a 'converted clown', having become a devout Christian. He gave up the theatre and joined the Hallelujah Band in Sheffield. In 1878 he published his autobiography, The Life and Adventures of Harvey Teasdale, the Converted Clown and Man Monkey, with his remarkable conversion in Wakefield Prison, and by 1881 he purported to have sold over 40,000 copies.

During his later life Teasdale preached Methodism in and around Sheffield. He was reunited with Sarah and lived with her until she died in 1883. He remarried in 1886.

Teasdale died in 1904 in Firvale Workhouse Asylum and is buried in the General Cemetery, Sheffield.

== Early life ==
Teasdale was born in Sheffield Park, and during his childhood he moved around Sheffield with his family. He attended several different schools, but he 'seldom went' unless accompanied by his sister, preferring to play truant. He began his education at the Carver Street National School, but instead of attending classes preferred to make trips to the Wicker Bridge and swim in the water fully dressed to amuse the blacksmiths. He then moved to Netherthorpe Academy where, when he attended school, he showed early signs of having a theatrical personality: 'I used to amuse the scholars by leaping through hoops and over chairs like a monkey'. He was later sent to Fox's School, where his mischievous reign continued. He alludes to being very popular in the school after playing numerous pranks on his school master, such as knocking a needle through his chair. Once more he was taken out of school, this time being relocated to a boarding school in the nearby town of Dronfield. Teasdale was a sprightly child who was 'very fond of running up spouts and getting on to roofs of buildings and running on the slates like a cat'. As a result, he was often involved in accidents and scrapes. Furthermore, he got into frequent fights with other boys in the town: 'I do not think at that time there was a lad in Sheffield... could stand any chance with me at fighting'.

After another failed attempt at settling his son in to a school, Teasdale's father, Benjamin, decided to keep him at home to with the intention of training him for the cutlery trade. However, on several occasions he claims to have shirked his errands. His family moved from Sheffield to Walkley Hall and it was here that Teasdale declared 'it was prophesied by one of the Walkley Belles that Harvey would become an actor!’ He began attending plays at Sheffield's Theatre Royal and his interest in acting was ignited. However, he still made time for mischief, like stealing fish at Crookes Moor Dam: 'The fish that I had caught were in my hat on my head. When asked what I had done with the fish I said that I had caught none. The fish… at that moment jumped on my head and appeared to my guilty conscience to say "Harvey, what a liar you are"’.’ In 1832 the Cholera epidemic swept Sheffield and Teasdale was one of its victims. He claimed he was very ill, but nevertheless managed to survive. Soon after his recovery Teasdale and a friend named Charles Black decided they wanted to leave Sheffield and head to London, but with no transport they had barely reached Chesterfield before they chose to give up.

Performing Life

Harvey began performing in Sheffield public houses and theatres in the early 1830s. He moved around the city taking rooms at different pubs, often playing the clown in performances. He alludes continuously to the vice and danger associated with the life of an actor: 'I shall not record the wicked scenes that were enacted in this room. I shall not lift the curtain'.

Teasdale's most famous stunt was his attempt to sail down the River Don in a barrel drawn by ducks. He advertised his performance on flaming placards throughout Sheffield and on the day approximately 70,000 people lined the streets to watch. As he sailed along the force of the crowd became so great part of the wall collapsed sending many spectators in to the water. Teasdale maintained that the cries of the people who had fallen 'might have appalled a stouter heart than mine'. Nobody was hurt, but many people 'cursed old Harvey and his ducks'. His attempt was a failure. The Sheffield Iris described the stunt as foolish novelty: 'The clown (Teasdale) made a start with his tub and ducks... but they were completely unmanageable, and he rolled and rocked about with his short paddles until he got a good dousing'.

Teasdale first played the 'man-monkey', his signature act, at Grantham Theatre in the mid 1840s. He drew in the crowds by jumping from balcony to stage dressed as a monkey. Teasdale was following in a tradition of Skin Performance: actors who impersonated and dressed like animals. His monkey performance was a huge success and it was from here that he began touring the country, meeting with excited audiences. Many local newspapers praised his performance, one referring to him as 'the Yorkshire Phenomenon!’ However, despite his many successes round the country, Teasdale never managed to make a name for himself in London, performing in the capital once to negative reviews: 'Mr Harvey Teasdale was very slow. He has much to learn before he can take his stand as clown in a leading London theatre'. He allegedly fought with the manager of Astley's Amphitheatre, London, and left, never to return to perform in the capital again. Yet in his memoir Teasdale speaks highly of his own talent and success: 'It was acknowledged, by undisputed authority, that mine was the best representation of the monkey that had ever appeared on stage'.

== Attempted murder and trial ==
In 1862 Teasdale's wife, Sarah, separated from him, taking their two daughters with her. Teasdale struggled to track them down and when he did begged them to return to him. After much chasing, Teasdale finally confronted Sarah, accusing her of earning a living as a prostitute and encouraging their daughters to do the same. He broke into her lodgings and fired a blank at her before attempting to cut her throat and his own. A neighbour intervened and alerted the authorities. Sarah survived the attack and was taken to hospital and Teasdale was arrested and taken to court. Most newspapers documenting the trial mention Teasdale's over-dramatic performance on the stand, reporting that there was laughter in the court room when Teasdale said 'I determined to fire it off and cut my throat in the smoke'. In his own defense he made the following claims: 'Four months ago we were staying at Leeds. I have been married to her 26 years. I loved the ground she walked on and she hated me. While we were in Leeds she left home one Saturday morning. I went in search of her and for the first time I found she was getting her living on the streets, and she boasted that I had not found her out'. He was sentenced to two years hard labour in Wakefield Prison.

== Conversion and controversy ==
Teasdale was interned at Wakefield between 1862 and 1864. He claimed that whilst in prison he underwent a conversion and decided to leave behind his life of vice in the performing industry and preach the doctrines of Methodism. Once released from prison Teasdale moved back to Sheffield and joined the Hallelujah Band to spread the message of Methodism. However, his sincerity is questionable: in an attempt to rid himself of his former persona and the monkey that had become his alter-ego, Teasdale advertised that he would burn his effects, including his monkey costume, in Sheffield's Temperance Hall. The Sheffield Daily Telegraph reported that 'placards have been circulated within the town, stating that Harvey Teasdale, the well-known man monkey and clown, would relate his experiences and destroy his dresses and theatrical effects'. Yet a different newspaper documents him burning his effects in Leeds and the Era suggests they were for sale: 'The whole of Harvey Teasdale's pantomimes, monkey pieces, manuscripts... to be sold for £2 10s'. In spite of his self-proclaimed conversion, there is evidence to suggest that Teasdale's former lifestyle habits continued.

Teasdale claims he then went to Totley and bought a donkey named Charley, with whom he would travel around the moors searching for work and food. He suggests it was his faith which got him through this lean period. Yet, it is questionable whether he was sincerely struggling or painting himself as a martyr. He was later reunited with Sarah, whom he converted to Methodism.

== Death ==
Teasdale died in 1904, aged 86. His obituary doesn't give a definite cause of death instead stating that 'for some time his brain had been affected'. He died in Firvale Workhouse Asylum, where he had been living for a fortnight. He is buried in the General Cemetery, Sheffield.

== Autobiography and legacy ==
Teasdale published the first edition of his autobiography in 1878. It went through several editions and by 1881 it had sold over 40,000 copies. Teasdale continued to sell his autobiography, alongside signed photographs of himself. The Life and Adventures of Harvey Teasdale, the Converted Clown and Man Monkey, with his remarkable conversion in Wakefield Prison is an unusual example of Victorian life-writing, detailing the extraordinary life of a working class performer who described himself as 'Harvey Teasdale, the converted clown, and once the greatest impersonator of the man monkey in the world, now a sinner saved by grace, fighting the battle of the cross!’ The autobiography has been noted for its highly dramatic tone, heavy use of Shakespearean and biblical quotations and the author's questionable sincerity.

Over the past few years a renewed local interest in Teasdale has developed. Efforts are being made towards the reprinting of his memoir within the University of Sheffield. In September 2014, Point Blank Theatre Company premiered their production, Harvey Teasdale: the Sheffield Man Monkey, based on Teasdale's life as part of Sheffield's Festival of the Mind. The production featured Vern Griffiths as Harvey Teadale, Jack Windle as the Chorus and Dr Butler's Hatstand Medicine Band as the Hallelujah Band.

== Publications ==
- Teasdale, H. (1870). The Life and Adventures of Harvey Teasdale the Converted Clown and Man Monkey ... Written by Himself. Seventh Edition, Etc.
