= James Hamilton (minister, born 1814) =

Scottish minister; author of religious tracts (1814-1867)

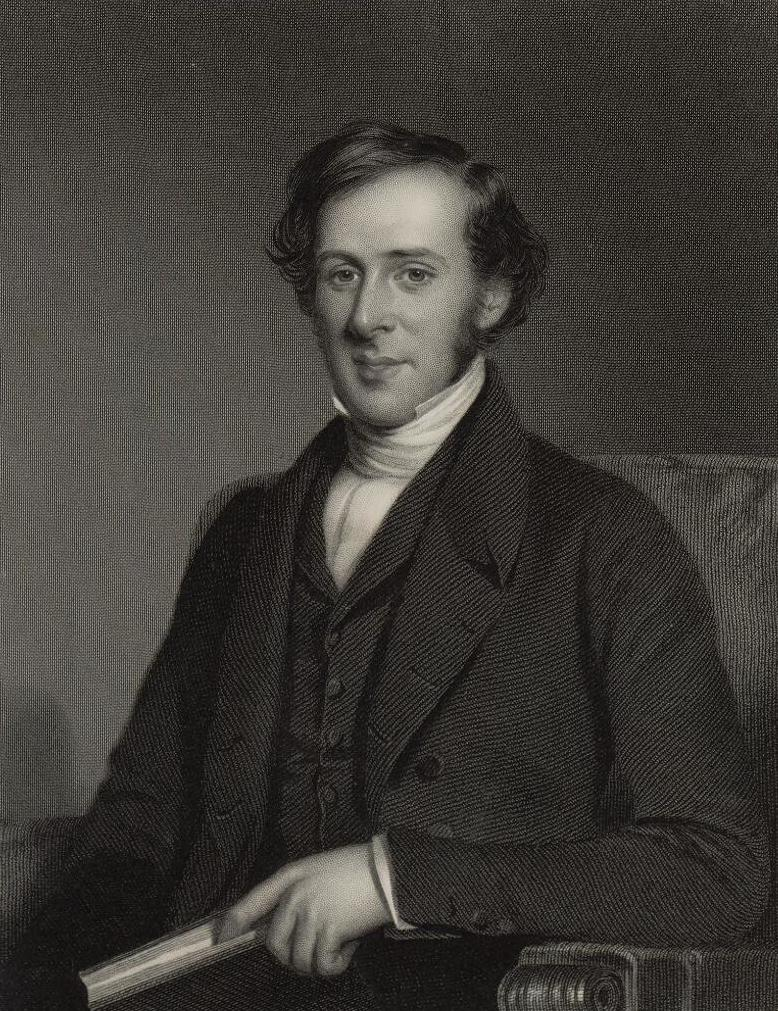
Portrait of James Hamilton

James Hamilton FLS (27 November 1814 – 24 November 1867) was a Scottish minister and a prolific author of religious tracts.

== Life ==
Born in Paisley, Scotland, seven miles west-southwest of Glasgow, Hamilton was the eldest son of William Hamilton, a Church of Scotland minister of Strathblane and religious author of local renown. James Hamilton was therefore destined from an early age to enter the ministry, and to that end he studied at the universities of Glasgow and Edinburgh. He enjoyed courses on the natural sciences, particularly chemistry and botany, and contemplated a career in one of those fields. Although Hamilton enjoyed poetry, he once read a novel by Sir Walter Scott and had the following reaction:

No sooner had he entered the charmed circle than the spell of the mighty magician was upon him, and every object that had hitherto appeared commonplace and tame was invested with fresh beauty and grandeur. He saw the old world flooded with a new sunshine, and beheld its inhabitants as he had never seen them before. But when he recovered breath, which he did only at the close of the work, and found himself restored to the world of every-day life, he asked himself if all this was right, but found himself obliged to answer in the negative. His delight had resembled the intoxication of an opium dream, and was therefore sinful, and worthy of condemnation. Such was his conclusion after a close and severe retrospection, in consequence of which he never perused another novel.

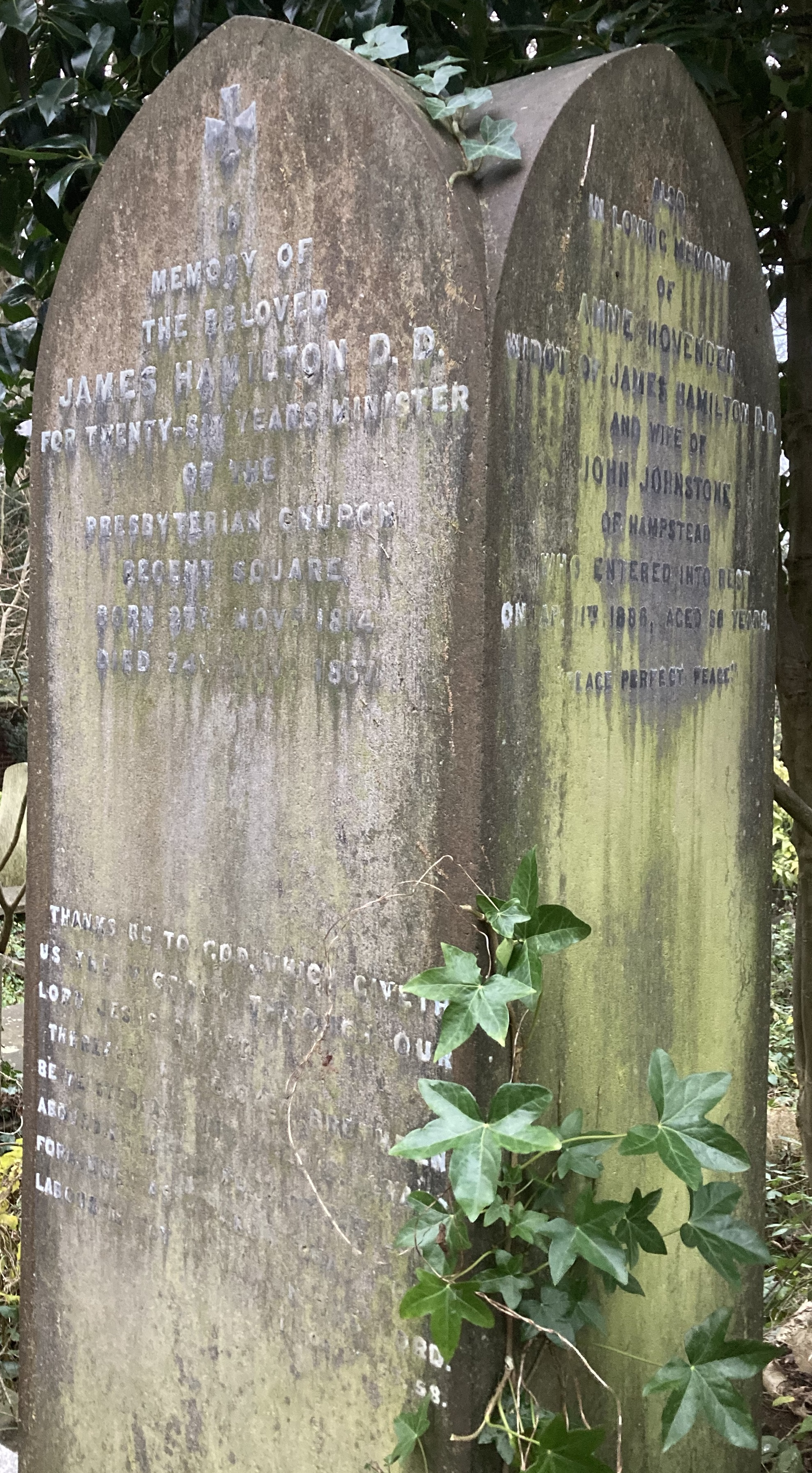
Grave of James Hamilton in the dissenters section of Highgate Cemetery (west side)

He became assistant to Robert Smith Candlish at St. George's Church in Edinburgh, in 1838, and upon finishing his college studies, he was licensed to preach by the Presbytery of Edinburgh in 1839 and "commenced his clerical life as assistant minister in the small secluded parish of Abernyte, in Perthshire". In January 1841, he was formally ordained as a minister, at Roxburgh Church in south Edinburgh, and in July of that year became pastor of the National Scotch Church, Regent Square, London, where he would remain until his death. In 1849 he became editor of the Presbyterian Messenger, and in 1864 editor of Evangelical Christendom, the organ of the Evangelical Alliance. He was an incessant literary worker and the author of some of the most widely circulated books of his day. His best known works were: Life in Earnest (London, 1845), of which 64,000 copies had been sold before 1852; The Mount of Olives (1846); The Royal Preacher (1851), a homiletical commentary on Ecclesiastes; and Our Christian Classics (4 vols., 1857–59). Following his death, his collected works were published in London (6 vols., 1869–73); and his Select Works appeared in New York (4 vols., 1875). In addition to his religious writings, Hamilton continued to have an interest in botany throughout his life, publishing several articles in journals on the subject.

== Family ==
Letter by James Hamilton (1857)

In 1847 he married Anne Hovenden Moore (d.1886) daughter of John Moore of Calcutta. Their children included:

- Anne Hamilton (1849-1910) married Sir Frederick Wills, 1st Baronet.
- James Hamilton (1850-1911)
- Mary Isabella Hamilton (1853-1887) married Alexander Lawrence
- Christina Jean Hamilton (1856-1885)
- Herbert William Hamilton (b.1861)
- Ada Frances Hamilton (1864-1902)
