= Sheffield Iris =

British weekly newspaper (1787-1794)

The Sheffield Iris was an early weekly newspaper published on Tuesdays in Sheffield, England.

The first newspaper to be published in Sheffield to see any degree of success was the Sheffield Weekly Journal in 1754. This was bought out in 1755 by the Sheffield Weekly Register, and was thereafter published in Doncaster.

== History ==
=== Sheffield Register ===
The Sheffield Register was the next newspaper to be established in the town. It was founded by Joseph Gales, a Unitarian, who supported various Radical causes, advocating religious tolerance, Parliamentary reform and the abolition of slavery, and opposed boxing and bull-baiting.

In June 1787, he began publishing the Sheffield Register, initially in partnership with David Martin, from offices in Hartshead. James Montgomery denied that he or Joseph Gales met Thomas Paine at this time (Holland, John, and James Everett. Memoirs of the life and writings of James Montgomery. 7 vols. London: Longman, Brown, Green and Longmans, 1854-56.1:79; 1:156n). The newspaper focussed on reporting local news, and on reprinting tracts by reformers such as Paine and Joseph Priestley. This was a novelty, as most provincial newspapers of the day simply reprinted stories from the London press.

In 1789, Martin left the partnership. Gales' politics became more prominent, and the newspaper celebrated the French Revolution and acted as the mouthpiece of the Sheffield Society for Constitutional Information, an artisan-based political organization established by Gales in 1791 which called for radical reforms.

The Register was extremely popular in the early 1790s, selling up to 2,000 copies of each issue. Gales established a companion fortnightly political journal, The Patriot, in 1792. The same year, the poet James Montgomery was appointed as clerk and bookkeeper for the newspaper offices.

In 1794, the Government began arresting leaders of the Corresponding Societies, and Gales wrote articles decrying this. Gales was suspected of writing a letter offering to sell pikes to the London society, but was on business in Derby when troops arrived to arrest him.

Alarmed as to his safety, Gales published his final issue of the Register, before fleeing to Hamburg in Germany. His wife Winifred remained behind to sell the Register to Montgomery, who relaunched the newspaper as the Sheffield Iris and adopted a less radical editorial line. Montgomery initially used capital supplied by the Unitarian minister Benjamin Naylor.

=== Sheffield Iris ===
Despite moderating the newspaper's line, Montgomery was prosecuted for sedition in 1795 for publishing a poem on a handbill which celebrated the fall of the Bastille, and was sentenced to three months in prison. On his release, he negotiated Naylor's withdrawal and became sole proprietor. In August, he wrote a report offering mild criticism of an incident in Norfolk Street, where a popular protest was attacked by a militia, resulting in two deaths. He was again prosecuted, this time for malicious libel, and was imprisoned for six months. While he was in prison, John Pye-Smith took over as editor, and kept the paper running. On Christmas Eve 1816 the paper published Montgomery's carol, "Angels from the Realms of Glory", which was to become one of the most popular Christmas carols sung in England. The usual English tune is entitled 'Iris' but is derived from a traditional French or Flemish melody harmonised by Charles Wood (composer) 1866-1926.

The Iris remained a successful newspaper, but Montgomery developed other interests and, in the face of increased competition, from the Sheffield and Rotherham Independent and the Sheffield Mercury, he sold it in to local bookseller John Blackwell in 1825. Blackwell appointed the poet John Holland as editor, and despite frequently expressing his dislike for the role, Holland spent much of the rest of his life as a newspaper editor. The Iris ceased publication in 1848.

A Sheffield Iris newspaper was briefly revived in 1855, following the removal of stamp duty, but lasted only until the following year.
