= Bede (disambiguation) =

Bede may refer to

== People ==
- Bede (Saint Bede, the Venerable Bede) (672 or 673 – May 27, 735), a monk at the Northumbrian monastery of Saint Peter at Wearmouth
- Bede Liu, professor of electrical engineering
- Alain Bédé (born 1970), Ivorian footballer
- Boris Bede (born 1989), French player of gridiron football
- Shelda Bede (born 1973), a beach volleyball player from Brazil who competed at the 2004 Summer Olympics
- Bede Griffiths (1906–1993), a British-born Benedictine monk and mystic who lived in ashrams in South India
- Jim Bede (1933–2015), aircraft designer, often credited with the creation of the modern kitplane market
- Olga Bede (1908–1985), a Romanian Magyar writer from Transylvania

== Places ==
Canada;

- Bede, Manitoba, a locality in Manitoba, Canada.

== Schools ==
- Venerable Bede Church of England Academy in Sunderland, Tyne and Wear, England
- St. Bede Academy in Peru, Illinois, USA
- St. Bede's Anglo Indian Higher Secondary School in Chennai, India
- St Bede's Catholic College in Bristol, England
- St Bede's Catholic High School, Lytham St Annes, Lancashire, England
- St Bede's Catholic High School, Ormskirk, Lancashire, England
- St Bede's Catholic School, Lanchester County Durham, England
- St Bede's Catholic School, Peterlee, County Durham, England
- St Bede's Catholic Voluntary Academy, in Scunthorpe, England
- St Bede's College, Christchurch in Christchurch, New Zealand
- St Bede's College, Manchester in Manchester, England
- St Bede's College (Mentone) in Mentone, Victoria, Australia
- St. Bede's Grammar School in Heaton, West Yorkshire, England
- St Bede's Inter-Church School in Cambridge, England
- St. Bede's Prep School in Eastbourne, East Sussex, England
- St. Bede's Preparatory School, Stafford in Stafford, Staffordshire, England
- St Bede's Roman Catholic High School, Blackburn, Lancashire, England
- St Bede's School, Hailsham, in Hailsham, East Sussex, England
- St. Bede's School in Redhill, Surrey, England
- College of St Hild and St Bede in Durham, England

== Texts ==
- Saint Petersburg Bede, an early surviving manuscript of Bede's eighth-century history, the Historia ecclesiastica gentis Anglorum (Ecclesiastical History of the English People)
- Tiberius Bede, the shortened name of two separate manuscripts of Bede's Historia ecclesiastica gentis Anglorum
- Moore Bede, an early manuscript of Bede's eighth-century Historia ecclesiastica gentis Anglorum

== Aeronautics ==
- Bede Aircraft, an aircraft corporation founded by controversial aeronautical engineer Jim Bede in 1961 to produce the BD-1 kit aircraft
  - Bede BD-1, a kit-built aircraft, the first design of American aeronautical engineer Jim Bede
  - Bede BD-5, a small, single-seat homebuilt kit aircraft that was introduced in the early 1970s by Bede Aircraft Corp

== Miscellaneous ==
- Adam Bede, George Eliot's first novel, published pseudonymously in 1859
- Beadsman or Bedesman, a pensioner
- Bede Island, an area of Leicester, England close to the city centre
- Bede Metro station, a Tyne and Wear Metro station named after the Venerable Bede
- Bede people, an ethnic group in Bangladesh
- Bede, the Hungarian name for Bedeni village in Gălești, Mureș, Romania
- Bede, a character from Pokémon Sword and Shield
- Bede supercomputer, see N8 Research Partnership

== See also ==
- Bédé, Bande dessinée French comics
- St Bede's Church
