= Norbury Manor =

Building in Derbyshire, United Kingdom

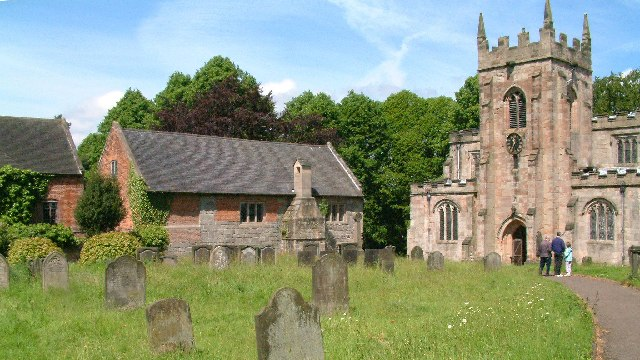
- Norbury church and hall

- Location within Derbyshire
- Alternative names: Norbury Hall, The Old Manor

General information
- Status: Manor house
- Architectural style: Medieval
- Location: Norbury, Derbyshire, United Kingdom
- Coordinates: 52°58′39″N 1°49′8″W
- Owner: National Trust

Listed Building – Grade I
- Official name: The Old Manor and attached garden wall
- Designated: 5 February 1952
- Reference no.: 1281200

Norbury Manor is a 17th-century manor house with an adjoining 14th-century stone-built medieval hall house, Norbury Hall, known as The Old Manor, in Norbury near Ashbourne, Derbyshire. It is a Grade I listed building.

The manor was owned by the FitzHerbert family from the 12th century, granted to William Fitz-Herbert in fee-farm by the Tutbury Priory in 1125. In 1444, Nicholas FitzHerbert and his son Ralph gave their land in Osmaston, along with other lands in Foston and Church Broughton, to the priory to purchase the manor.

Norbury Hall, built by William FitzHerbert in the mid-14th century and otherwise known as The Old Manor, is remarkably well preserved. It is a medieval hall house, and is noted for its historic architectural features including a rare king post, medieval fireplace, a Tudor door and some 17th-century Flemish glass. The adjoining Norbury Manor was rebuilt in about 1680, replacing an earlier Tudor house, and has nineteenth-century additions.

The accompanying gardens include a parterre herb garden.

The manor was badly damaged by Parliamentary forces during the English Civil War and after the death of Sir John FitzHerbert in 1649 was in a ruinous state and fell into disuse.

On the death of John FitzHerbert in 1649, the estate passed to his cousin William FitzHerbert of Swynnerton Hall, Staffordshire, who rebuilt the Tudor portion of the property in about 1680. The Fitzherberts sold the estate in 1881.

The site has been owned by the National Trust since 1987; the manor is currently used as holiday accommodation, having previously been let to tenants. The Old Manor (i.e. the medieval hall), however, is open to the public on Thursdays from the first Thursday in May until the last Thursday in September.

Junior branches of the FitzHerbert family had seats at Tissington Hall and Somersal Herbert Hall.

== See also ==
- Grade I listed buildings in Derbyshire
- Listed buildings in Norbury and Roston
