= White boar =

Heraldic badge

White Boar badge with Richard III's motto Loyaulte me lie ("Loyalty binds me").

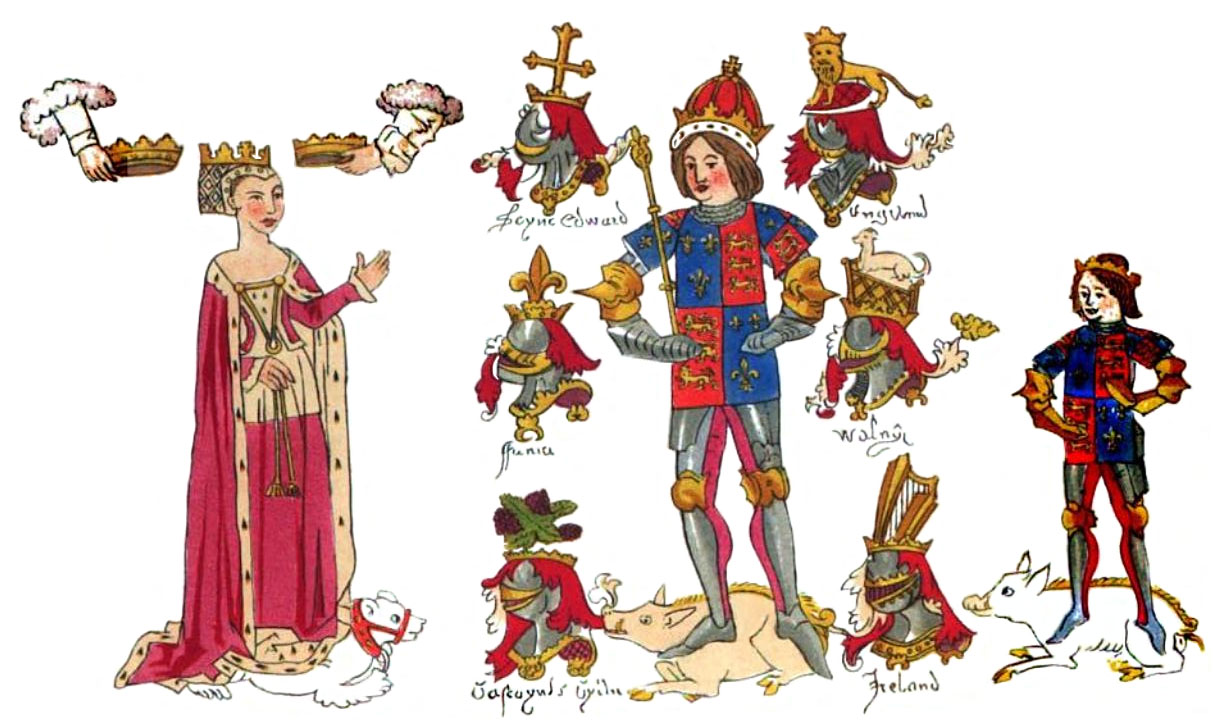
Richard and his son standing on boars in a contemporary heraldic roll by John Rous

The White Boar was the personal device or badge of the English King Richard III of England (1452–1485, reigned from 1483), and is an early instance of the use of boars in heraldry.

== Use in Richard's coronation ==
Livery badges were important symbols of political affiliation in the Wars of the Roses, and Richard distributed very large numbers at his coronation and the installation of his son Edward as Prince of Wales, for which an order of 13,000 badges in fustian cloth is recorded.

== Connections to Windsor Castle and to Eboracum ==
Edward appears to have shared use of the badge, either from Richard's accession to the throne, or his own appointment as Prince of Wales, both in 1483, to his death the next year. Richard's choice of the badge was no doubt personal, but according to a slightly later document the boar had been a badge of the royal possession the "Honour of Windsor" (an "honour" was a large estate, not necessarily all located around the place from which it took its name). Another suggestion is that the boar was a pun on "Ebor", a contraction of Eboracum, the Latin name for York; Richard was known as "Richard of York" before being created Duke of Gloucester.

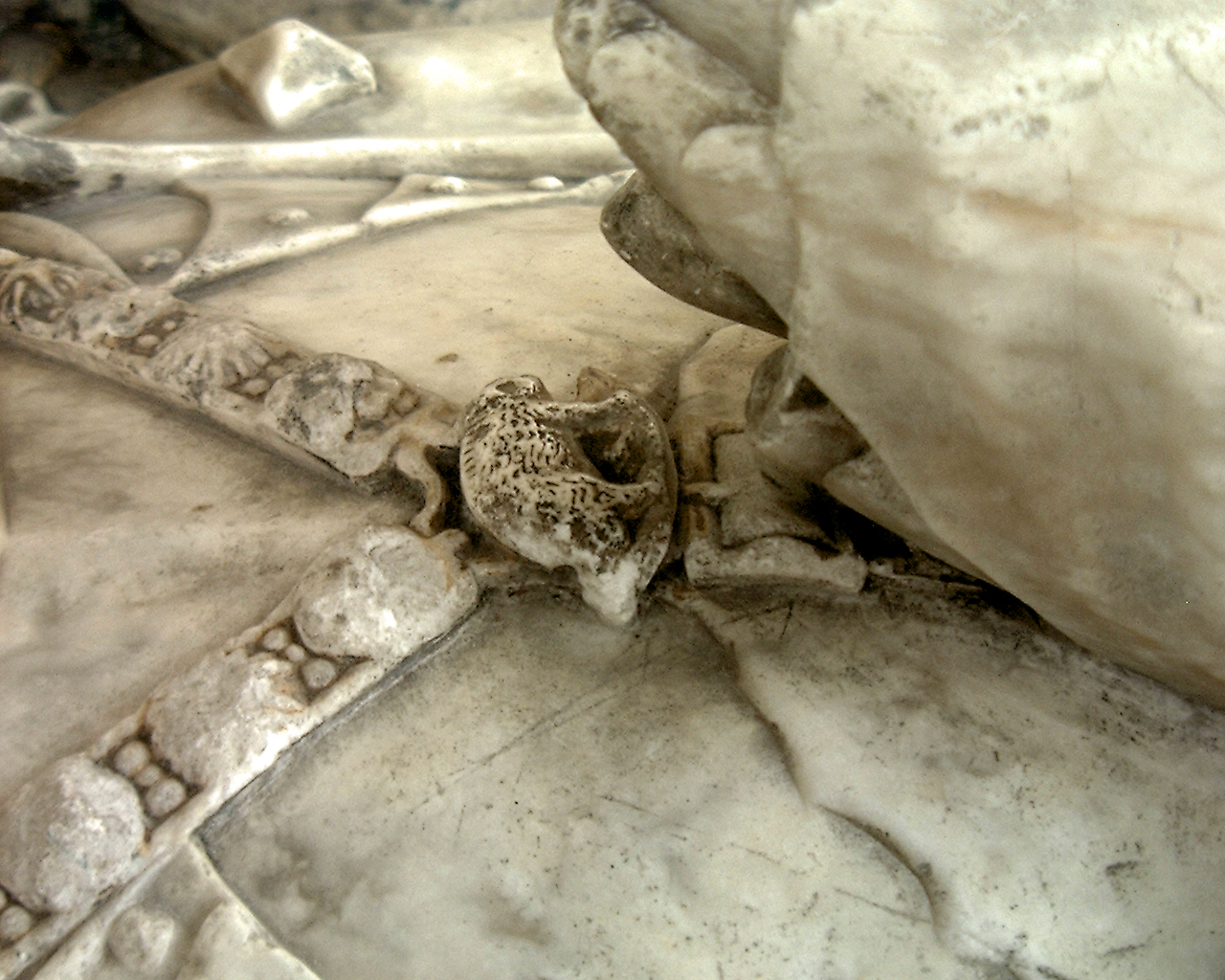
The white boar badge of Richard III as pendant to a Yorkist livery collar on the tomb monument of Sir Ralph Fitzherbert (died 1483), in St Mary and St Barlock's Church, Norbury in Derbyshire.

== Surviving examples in artifacts ==
Richard was villainized after his death by the Tudor dynasty that followed his brief reign, and most of his badges would no doubt have been hurriedly discarded after his death. Only two examples survived on tomb monuments, one of which was destroyed in the 20th century. The sole remaining example is a pendant white boar on a Yorkist livery collar carved in the alabaster effigy of Sir Ralph Fitzherbert, who died in Richard's reign in 1483. A number of metal badges, for pinning to the chest or a hat, have survived in lead, silver, and gilded copper high relief, the last found at Richard's home of Middleham Castle in Yorkshire, and very likely worn by one of his household when he was Duke of Gloucester.

A new example in silver-gilt was found in 2009 on or near the battlefield of the Battle of Bosworth Field, where Richard was killed in 1485, which with other finds is leading to historians rethinking the precise location of the battle. The archaeologist responsible for the site, Dr Glenn Foard, said: "... several of the objects are amazing. The most important by far is the silver-gilt boar, which was Richard III’s own badge, given in large numbers to his supporters. But this one is special, because it is silver-gilt. It was almost certainly worn by a knight in King Richard’s own retinue who rode with the King to his death in his last desperate cavalry charge. It was found right next to the site of a small medieval marsh – and the King was killed when his horse became stuck in a mire." This badge was similar, but not identical, to the Chiddingly Boar found in Chiddingly, East Sussex in 1999, and now in the British Museum. This is, or was, also in silver-gilt, though much of the gilding has worn off. Badges in precious metals would have been given to the more important, or perhaps intimate, of Richard's supporters. No doubt there were once badges in gold, enamel and gems for still more important supporters, like the Lancastrian Dunstable Swan Jewel.

== Use by the Richard III Society ==
The Richard III Society, dedicated to defending Richard III's reputation, makes extensive use of white boars in its various forms of heraldry. It was originally called the Fellowship of the White Boar.

== See also ==
- White Hart
