= Norbury, Derbyshire =

Village in Derbyshire, England

Coordinates: 52.978°N 1.818°W

Norbury
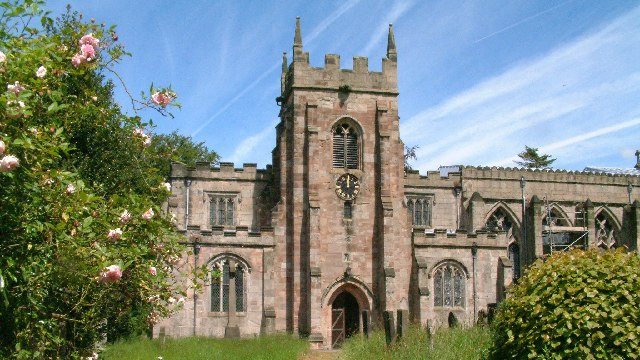
- St Mary and St Barlock's Church, Norbury

- Location within Derbyshire
- OS grid reference: SK123423
- Civil parish: Norbury with Roston
- District: Derbyshire Dales
- Shire county: Derbyshire
- Region: East Midlands
- Country: England
- Sovereign state: United Kingdom
- Post town: ASHBOURNE
- Postcode district: DE6
- Police: Derbyshire
- Fire: Derbyshire
- Ambulance: East Midlands

Norbury is a village in Derbyshire, England. It is located 3 miles (4.8 km) north of Rocester, on the B5033 road and the River Dove (which is the traditional border for Staffordshire). The hamlet has links with George Eliot's family, the Evans. George Eliot's father, Robert Evans, was born in Roston Common and sang in the choir at Norbury church, and most of George Eliot's paternal ancestors are buried there.

The ecclesiastical parish of Norbury includes Norbury, Roston, the parochial chapel and manor of Snelston, the hamlets of Birchwood and Darley Moor, and formerly included the liberty of Stydd, now in Yeaveley.

A Methodist chapel stood where Chapel Farm, by the Queen Adelaide Inn, is now. Dinah Morris (based on George Eliot's aunt, Elizabeth Evans) preached here. Eliot's father Robert was a carpenter at Norbury, and became a land agent here- he moved with his employer to Arbury, where Eliot was born to his second wife. Eliot's own connections with Norbury were slight: "As to my indebtedness to facts of locale – the details which I knew as facts and have made use of for my picture were gathered from such imperfect allusion and narrative as I heard from my father in his occasional talk about old times". The carpenter's shop at Norbury was associated with the smell of pinewood and the scent of elderflower; Eliot said to Oscar Browning that the elder tree growing at the door of the workshop was an early recollection closely connected with the poetry of her life.

The graveyard contains the graves of Thias and Lisbeth Bede.

== History ==
Like many places in Derbyshire, Norbury was mentioned in the Domesday Book, in 1086, together with Roston, amongst the many manors given to Henry de Ferrers by William the Conqueror. The village was spelt Nordberie or Nortberie. At that time the village had a church and a mill.

Norbury Manor was given to Henry de Ferrers in 1081, the previous Saxon owner Sweyn having been dispossessed and imprisoned for his part in the uprising of Hereward the Wake. Henry founded a priory at Tutbury and gave Norbury to them. In 1125 the prior of Tutbury gave Norbury in fee-farm to William Fitzherbert on a yearly rental of 100 shillings. In 1442 Nicholas Fitzherbert and his son and heir Ralph gave all their lands at Osmaston and other lands at Foston and Church Broughton in exchange for Norbury. The Fitzherberts held it until 1872.

The village steadily declined in population throughout the 19th and 20th centuries. In 1841 the population of Norbury and Roston was 510, in 1895 there were 414 inhabitants. By 1935 there were 365 villagers, decreasing further to an estimated 315 in 1951. According to the 2001 census the population was 270.

=== Ann Moore ===
Ann (Pegg) Moore was born in Rosliston or Norbury in 1761. About 1788 she went to Tutbury, where in 1807 she declared that she could live without food. Exhibiting herself to the paying public whilst lying in her bed holding a bible earned her about £240 (or £14,000 in today's (2008) money, and also attracted the attentions of medical men and ministers of the church. After some prevarication she agreed to be watched continually, which arrangement lasted a week by which time she was so debilitated that the watchers agreed for her daughter to visit her alone. Afterwards traces of food were found on her clothes and bed, but it was not until 1813 that she confessed to the deception.

== The church ==
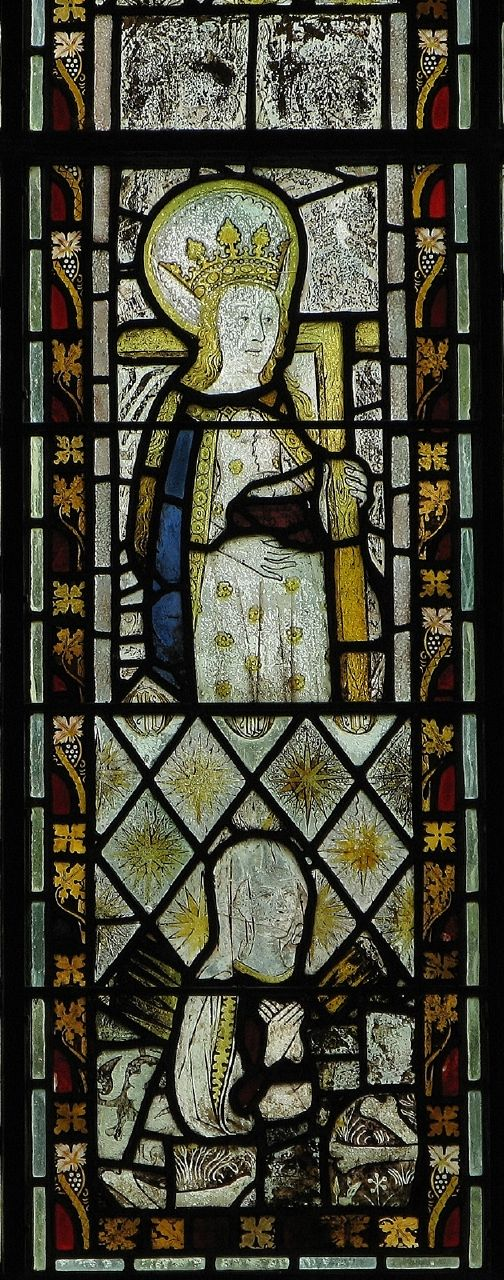
Stained glass in chancel east window (15th century, detail in church of St Mary and St Barlok

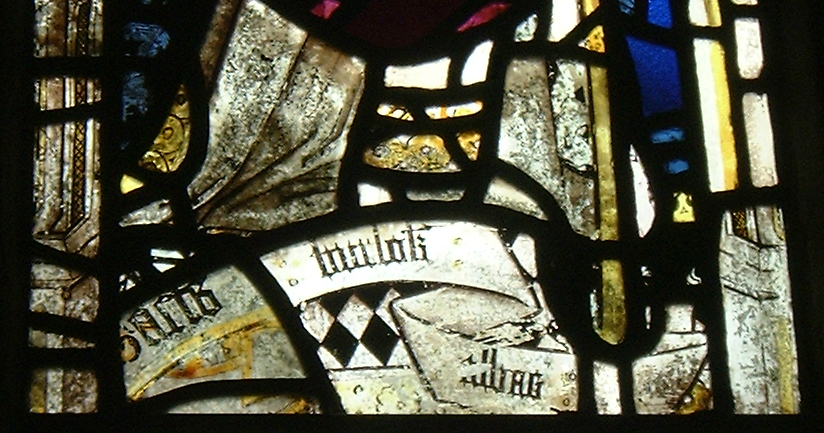
Sactus Burlok Abbas

The present church is the third one on this site, the first being Anglo-Saxon and the second a Late Norman church. This second church was built c. 1179 by John Fitzherbert, 3rd Lord of Norbury and dedicated to St Barlacus. The saint appears in the centre light of the south window; he is portrayed holding a pastoral staff in his left hand and a book in his right. Underneath there are the words Sactus Burlok Abbas. The name also appears as Saint Barlok in a 1491 charter.

Saint Barlock has been identified with Saint Finbarr, an Irish abbot and bishop of the 7th century and the patron saint of Cork. The dedication may arise from John Fitzherbert having been Governor of Waterford for 3 years c. 1174. Born in the second half of the 6th century, Finnbar was baptised Lochan, but was later called Fionn Barr or the Fair-Headed One. His life was recorded in the manuscript Lives of Finn Barr. The parish church of Fowey in Cornwall is dedicated to him, as St Fimbarrus. This Cornish church was built c. 1170 by William Fitzturold, the name of the patron saint being given as Barrianus.

The present church of St Mary and St Barlock was built piecemeal over a period of about 200 years. The chancel is the earliest part of the church, and is unusually large in relation to the rest of the fabric. It is 46 feet (14 m) long, and is both wider and higher than the nave (which at 49 feet (15 m) is slightly longer). The design of the chancel windows' tracery indicates a building date of c. 1300–1310, as does the contemporary armorial glass. Two of the arms depicted are those of Otton de Grandson who left England in 1307, and Robert the Bruce, at war with England from 1306. The roof of the chancel is a later 15th century wooden construction; external buttresses and internal shafts running up to the roof line indicate that the original design may have intended a fan vault, never built.

The south tower, nave and chapel east of the tower were built by Nicholas Fitzherbert (d. 1473), he or his son Ralph (d. 1483) built the north aisle, and his grandson John Fitzherbert (d. 1513) built the south-west chapel, which was finished in 1517. Much of the stained glass added by the Fitzherberts survives; these are for the most part figures painted in grisaille. In the south-east chapel there is a window showing the donor and his family.

=== Fitzherbert memorials ===
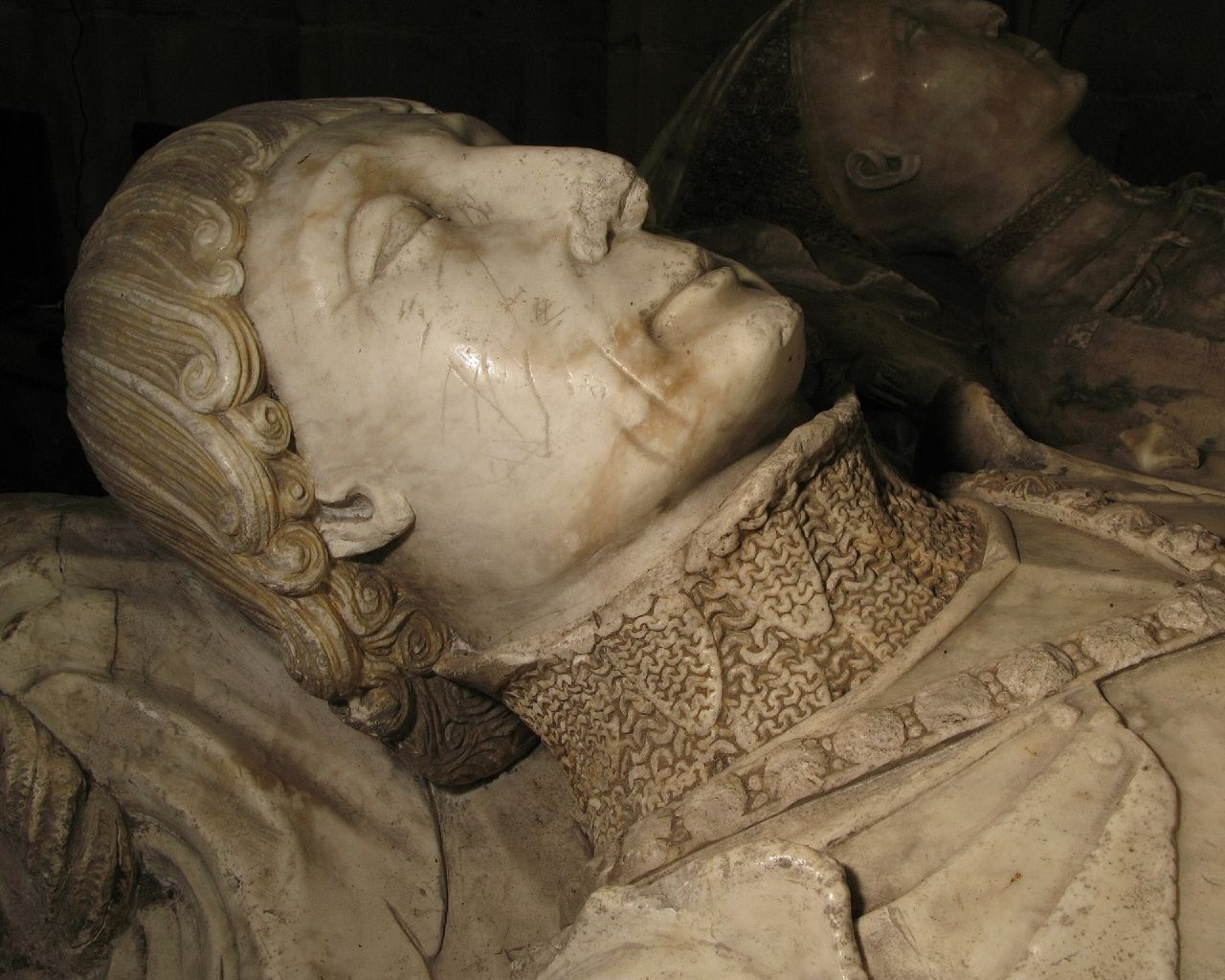
Ralph Fitzherbert in Alabaster

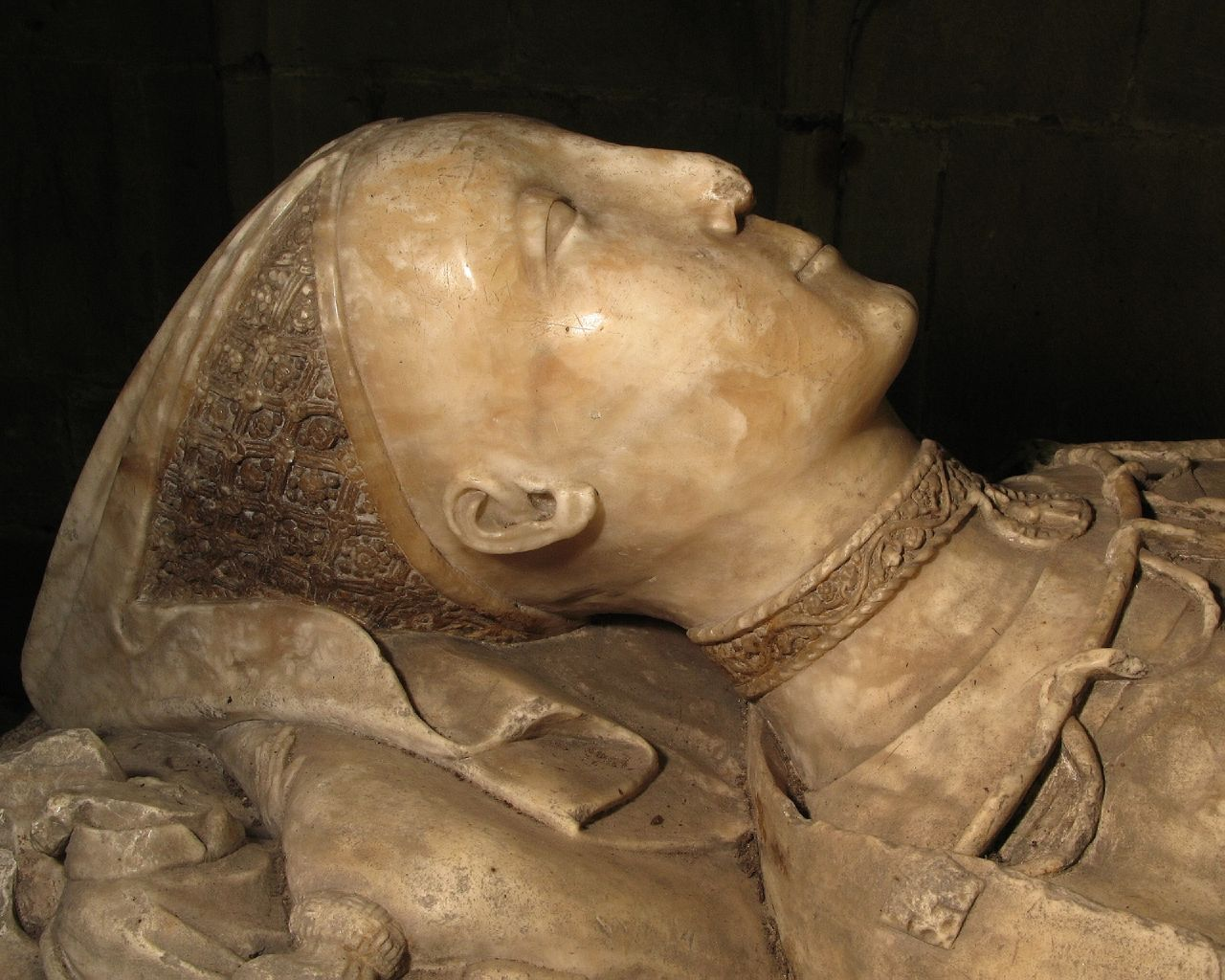
Ralph's wife

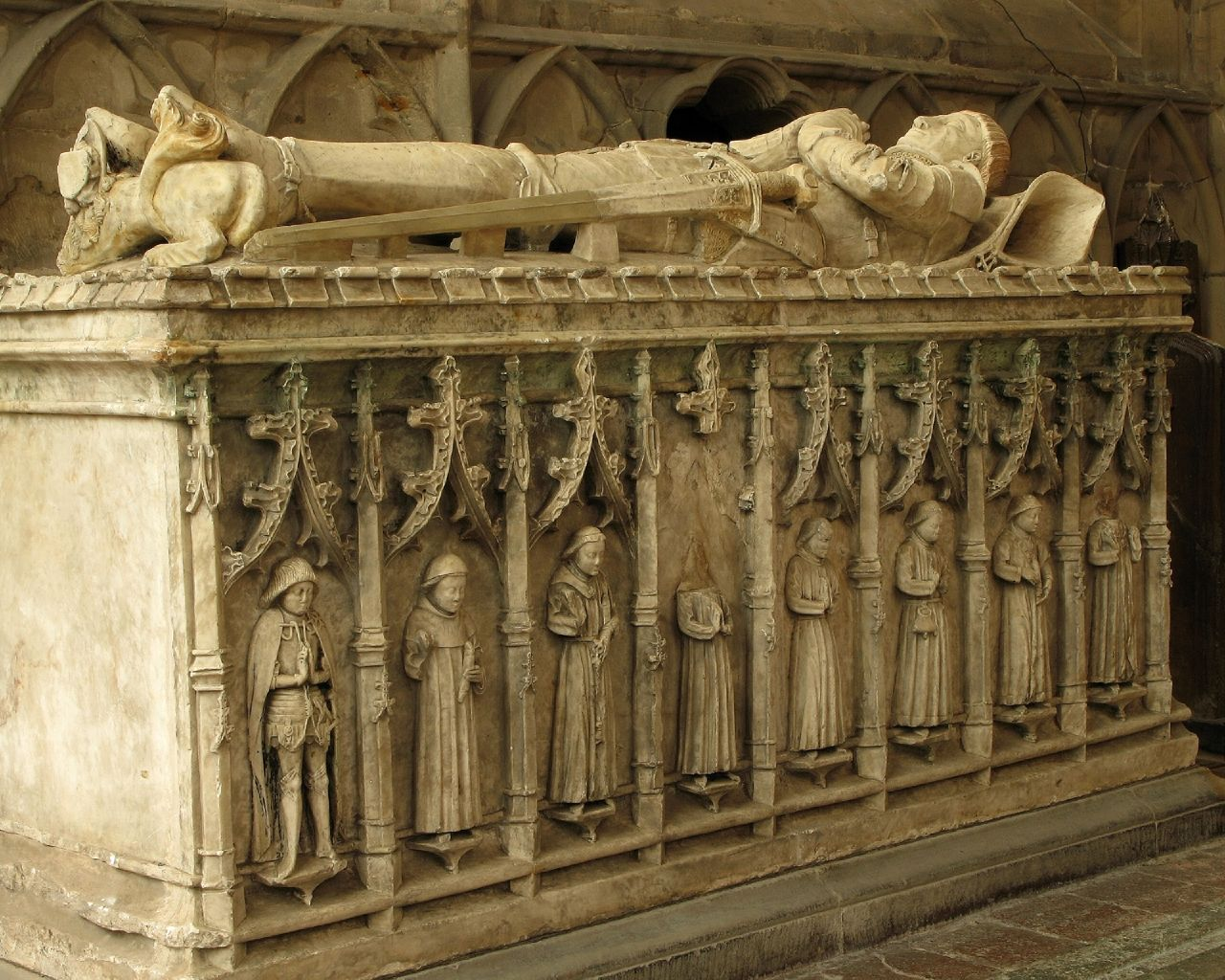
Nicholas Fitzherbert's tomb

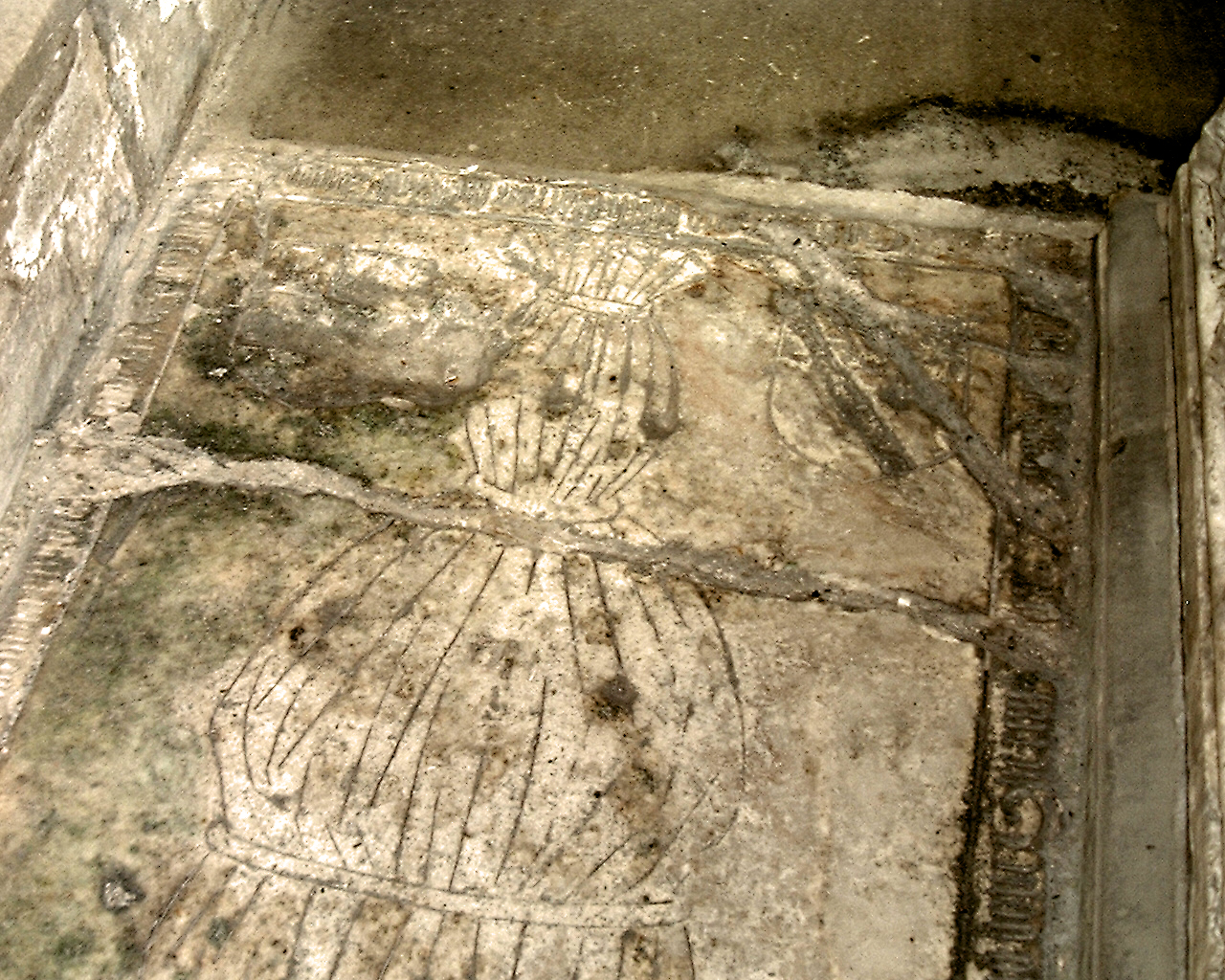
Benedicta Fitzherbert's tomb

There are a number of memorials to the Fitzherbert family in the church, including Sir Henry (d. 1315) depicted as a cross-legged knight, Nicholas (d. 1473) carved in alabaster with attendant mourners, and Sir Ralph Fitzherbert (d. 1483) and his wife, again in alabaster.

The crossed legs of Henry, 6th Lord of Norbury c. 1275- c. 1315 indicate his profession of Christian faith and not participation in a Crusade; although his year of death is uncertain it is known that he was not a Crusader

Nicholas Fitzherbert, High Sheriff of Derbyshire and 11th Lord of Norbury died in 1473. He is shown in full plate armour with a collar of alternating suns and roses with a pendant of the White Lion of the House of Marche, the badge of Edward IV. There is a small angel supporting his right foot.

Ralph's feet rest on a lion; next to it and under Ralph's shoe crouches the small figure of a bedesman. The bearded bedesman is telling his rosary for the souls of the departed. Ralph bears the Yorkist livery collar of alternating suns and roses, with the White Boar of Richard III as a pendant. Since the destruction of the effigy of Ralph Neville (d. 1484) at Brancepeth, this is the only surviving representation of a boar pendant.

The armour portrayed on the effigy of Ralph Fitzherbert has been reproduced as a fully functional suit of plate.

An incised effigy on an alabaster slab of a woman tied in a shroud has been identified as that of Benedicta (d. 1531) wife of John Fitzherbert, 13th Lord. The effigy is surrounded with four coats of arms, one of which is of the Bradbourne family of Benedicta. Above the figure is a worn inscription with the date 1531.

John Fitzherbert separated from Benedicta early in their marriage. In his will he disinherited Benedicta and denied paternity of her children, stating "…Bennett my wyffe hath been of lewd and vile disposicion and cowde not be content with me but forsaken my houshoolde and company and lyffed in other places where yt pleased her."

The great east window of the chapel originally held 14th century glass depicting a large scene with full-sized figures. By 1770 the glass was in very bad condition. At that time the rectors of parishes were personally responsible for the financing of repairs to their churches- so the rector of Norbury, the Rev. S. Mills, had the window bricked up with the glass remaining in situ. In 1830 the then rector, the Rev. Thomas Bingham, was approached by a Roman Catholic family of Yorkshire with a view to purchasing the glass. Whether the glass was removed and sold, or stolen (as happened at Haddon Hall), or had disintegrated is not known, but it had disappeared by 1842 when the window was opened up again and filled with 15th century glass taken from the rest of the church windows.

== Norbury Manor ==
Norbury Manor close by the church comprises the Old Manor built c. 1250 and enlarged c. 1305 by Sir Henry Fitzherbert and the adjoining 15th century hall house which was substantially rebuilt in about 1680 and which contains panelling and stained glass from the Tudor house. The glass depicts the Labours of the Months.

A notable member of the FitzHerbert family was the judge Sir Anthony Fitzherbert. The manor fell into disuse in the 16th century when Sir John FitzHerbert married Ann Eyre and moved to Padley Hall.

Norbury Manor is now owned by the National Trust, and is a National Trust Holiday Cottage. Visitors are welcome to tour the old Hall and gardens on two specific days each week from April to October. (Fri 11:00 to 13:00, Sat 13:00 to 15:00).

== The watermill ==
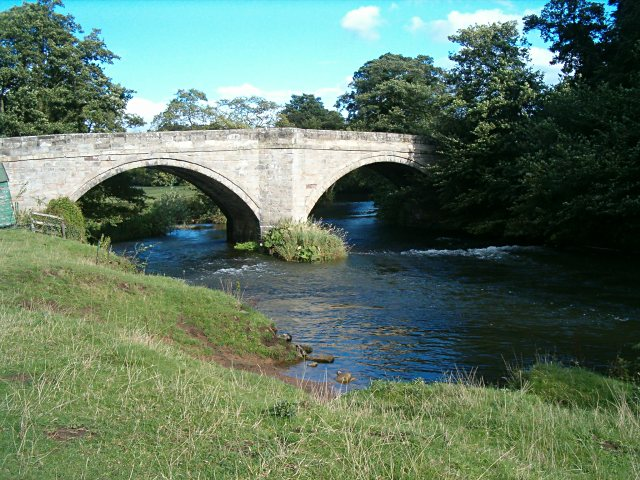
The nearby bridge over the River Dove to Staffordshire where the Fitzherberts were once Sheriff

Norbury Mill (grid reference SK120422) is a stone building of 2 storeys, 85 feet (26 m) long and 25 feet (7.6 m) wide. It is probably of 17th century construction; it has a datestone inscribed WB 1736. The mill is fed from a leat ½ mile in length flowing from a weir on the River Dove. There are two wheels, both low breastshot, at the south and north ends of the mill. In 1809 the mill had 3 pairs of millstones for grinding corn. Milling appears to have ceased in 1928, although it may have resumed later. In 1932 a saw mill and generating dynamo were added by the estate of Norbury Hall, both being driven by the waterwheels. The last miller, Sam Wheeldon, finished in 1955.

== Transport ==
In 1852, Norbury had access to the North Staffordshire Railway's branch line to Ashbourne at Norbury and Ellaston railway station and this continued until 1952 (and 1954 for freight traffic).

== Norbury today ==
Today the National Trust own the "Old Manor". The village has a Church of England primary school called Norbury School. although there are only 36 students in some school years for Norbury ward.

Generally the population is less economically active than the East Midlands in general, but are in better health. The prevailing religion is Christian (86%) with "no religion" as the second highest choice (5.5%). Norbury Church celebrated their 700th anniversary in 2010.

== See also ==
- Listed buildings in Norbury and Roston
