= Roston =

Hamlet in Derbyshire, England

Coordinates: 52.987°N 1.774°W

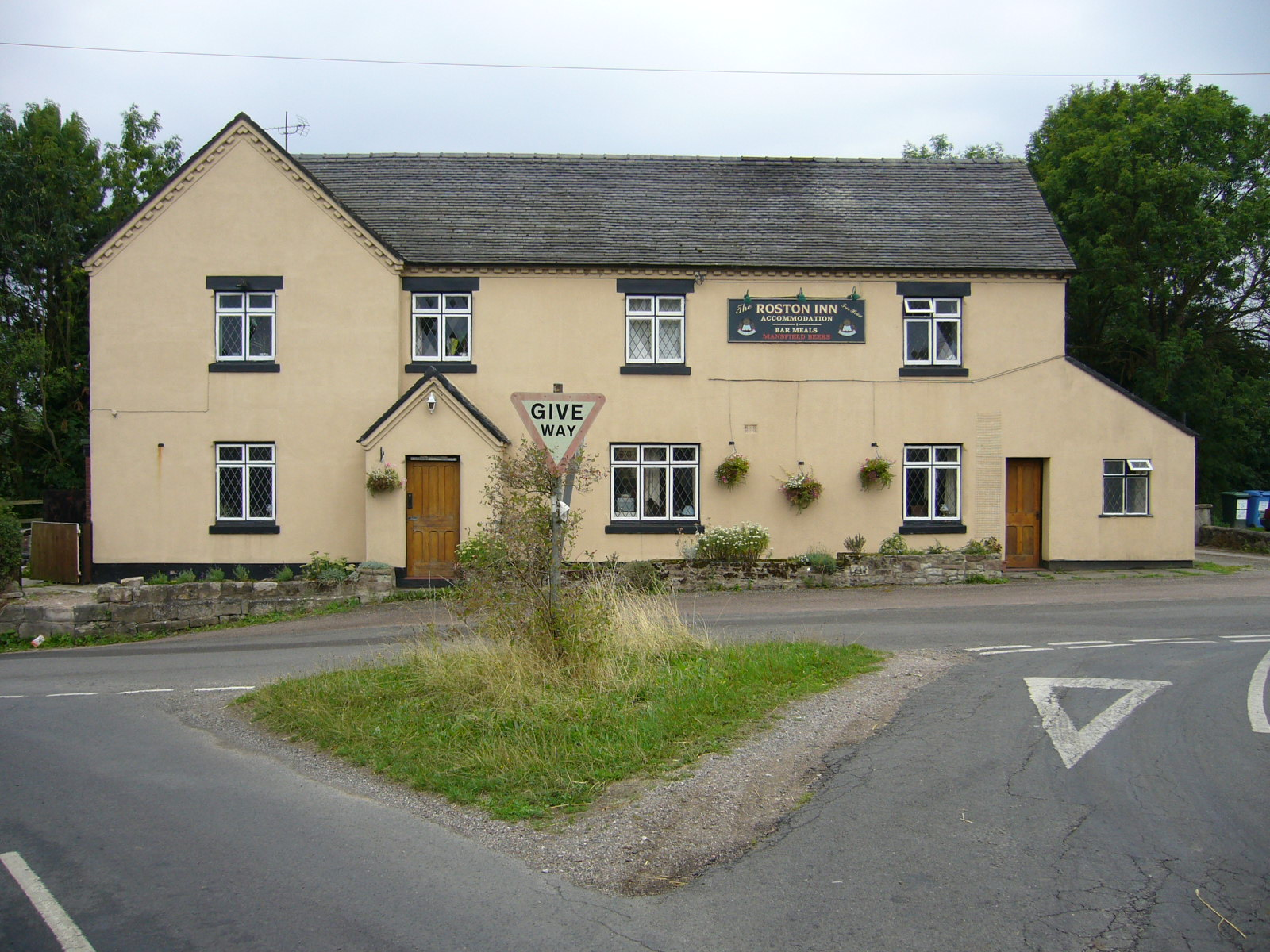
- The Roston Inn

- Location within Derbyshire
- OS grid reference: SK1241
- Civil parish: Norbury with Roston
- District: Derbyshire Dales
- Shire county: Derbyshire
- Region: East Midlands
- Country: England
- Sovereign state: United Kingdom
- Post town: ASHBOURNE
- Postcode district: DE6
- Police: Derbyshire
- Fire: Derbyshire
- Ambulance: East Midlands

Roston is a hamlet in Derbyshire, England. It is located north of Rocester. The Roston Inn (known locally as 'The Shant') is at the junction of Mill Lane and Lid Lane in the hamlet. Roston is in the parish of Norbury with Roston.

Roston Common is a short distance east from Roston. George Eliot's father, Robert Evans was born here and sang in the choir at Norbury church.

== History ==
Like many places in Derbyshire, Roston was mentioned in the Domesday Book, in 1086, amongst the many manors given to Henry de Ferrers by William the Conqueror. It is mentioned with Norbury and as a place in its own right.

== See also ==
- Listed buildings in Norbury and Roston
