= Listed buildings in Norbury and Roston =

Norbury and Roston is a civil parish in the Derbyshire Dales district of Derbyshire, England. The parish contains nine listed buildings that are recorded in the National Heritage List for England. Of these, two are listed at Grade I, the highest of the three grades, and the others are at Grade II, the lowest grade. The parish contains the village of Norbury, the hamlet of Roston, and the surrounding countryside. The listed buildings consist of a church and graves in the churchyard, a medieval hall house and an attached 17th-century country house, a former water mill and a drying kiln, a smaller house, and two bridges.

== Key ==
| Grade | Criteria |
|---|---|
| I | Buildings of exceptional interest, sometimes considered to be internationally important |
| II | Buildings of national importance and special interest |

== Buildings ==
| Name and location | Photograph | Date | Notes | Grade |
|---|---|---|---|---|
| St Mary and St Barlock's Church; 52.97880°N 1.81457°W | | 12th century | The church has been altered and extended through the centuries, and was restored during the 19th century. It is built in sandstone with lead roofs, and consists of a nave with a clerestory, a north aisle, a tower in the centre of the south side flanked by chapels, and a large chancel. The tower has two stages, stepped buttresses, and a doorway with a pointed arch and a moulded surround, above which is a niche with an ogee head, and a clock face. The bell openings have two lights, and above them are a moulded string course with central gargoyles, embattled parapets, and corner crocketed pinnacles. The parapets along the south front are embattled, those on the chancel with a wavy design, and the chancel windows contain unusual tracery. | I |
| The Old Manor and wall 52.97849°N 1.81482°W | | Early 14th century | A medieval hall house, a small 17th-century country house at right angles, and a linking bay between. The medieval house is mainly in stone with a moulded string course, and a tile roof with moulded coped gables. There are two storeys and a cellar, and two bays. In the centre is a doorway with a moulded surround, a four-centred arched head, carved spandrels and a hood mould, above which is a plaque. The windows vary. The 17th-century house is in red brick on a stone plinth, with quoins, a floor band, moulded eaves cornices and a hipped tile roof. There are two storeys and attics, and eight bays. The doorway has a moulded surround, the windows are cross windows, and in the roof are three dormers with hipped roofs. Attached to the house is a stone wall containing a dovecote and a doorway. | I |
| Norbury Mill; 52.97718°N 1.82225°W | — | Early 17th century | The former watermill is in sandstone with repairs in red brick, and has a tile roof with coped gables and moulded kneelers. There are two storeys and four bays, and wheelhouses to the north and south. The openings include doorways with segmental heads and voussoirs, and windows, some of which are mullioned, and some have hood moulds. | II |
| Corn drying kiln, Norbury Mill; 52.97698°N 1.82230°W | — | 17th century | The corn drying kiln is in sandstone and has a tile roof with moulded coped gables and kneelers. There are two storeys and two bays. It contains doorways and windows, some of which are blocked. | II |
| Stone Cottage; 52.97797°N 1.81534°W | | 17th century | The house, which was refashioned in the 19th century, is in sandstone on a deep plinth, and has a tile roof with moulded coped gables and a finial. There are two storeys and two bays. The south front is gabled, and contains three-light mullioned windows, and flanking the gable are two flat-roofed dormers. | II |
| Grave; 52.97858°N 1.81458°W | — | Early 18th century | The grave in the churchyard of St Mary and St Barlock's Church is in sandstone. To the west it has a thick tombstone with a wavy head and an inscription, and to the east is a coffin slab with a raised curved band. | II |
| Group of three gravestones 52.97862°N 1.81429°W | — | Early 18th century | The gravestones are in the churchyard of St Mary and St Barlock's Church, and are in sandstone. All have thick tombstones with wavy edges and moulded edges, and all have inscriptions. | II |
| Norbury Mill Bridge; 52.97778°N 1.81931°W | — | Mid 18th century | The bridge carries Dove Street (B5033 road) over the River Dove. It is in sandstone, and consists of a single segmental arch. The bridge has a raised keystone and hood, a plain band and spandrels, and later parapets with chamfered copings. | II |
| Rocester Bridge; 52.94993°N 1.82957°W | | Mid 19th century | The bridge carries Mill Street over the River Dove. It is in sandstone, and consists of a single segmental arch. The bridge has a moulded string course, a coped parapet with a hollow chamfered under edge, and buttresses with pyramidal caps. The abutments end in piers with an oblong section and pyramidal caps. | II |
