= St Mary and St Barlock's Church, Norbury =

Grade I listed church in Norbury, Derbyshire

St Mary and St Barlock’s Church, Norbury
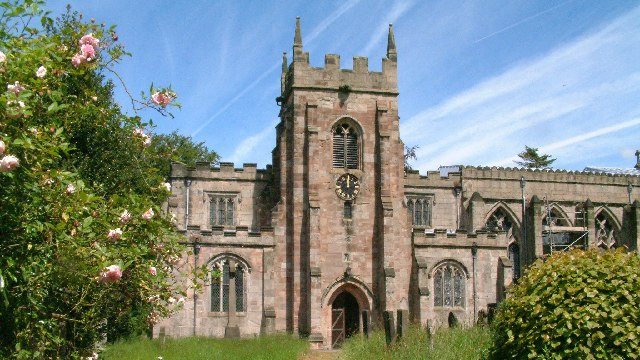
- St Mary and St Barlock’s Church, Norbury
- St Mary and St Barlock’s Church, Norbury
- 52°58′40.44″N 1°48′55.04″W
- OS grid reference: SK 12549 42395
- Location: Norbury, Derbyshire
- Country: England
- Denomination: Church of England

History
- Dedication: St Mary and [[Barloc of Norbury|St Barlock]]

Architecture
- Heritage designation: Grade I listed

Specifications
- Length: 95.5 feet (29.1 m)

Administration
- Province: Canterbury
- Diocese: Derby
- Archdeaconry: Derby
- Deanery: Ashbourne
- Parish: Norbury

St Mary and St Barlock's Church, Norbury is a Grade I listed parish church in the Church of England in Norbury, Derbyshire.

== History ==
The present church is the third one on this site, the first being Anglo-Saxon and the second a Late Norman church. This second church was built c. 1179 by John Fitzherbert, 3rd Lord of Norbury and dedicated to St Barlacus. The saint appears in the centre light of the south window; he is portrayed holding a pastoral staff in his left hand and a book in his right. Underneath there are the words Sactus Burlok Abbas. The name also appears as Saint Barlok in a 1491 charter.

Saint Barlock has been identified with Saint Finbarr, an Irish abbot and bishop of the 7th century and the patron saint of Cork. The dedication may arise from John Fitzherbert having been Governor of Waterford for 3 years c. 1174. Born in the second half of the 6th century, Finnbar was baptised Lochan, but was later called Fionn Barr or the Fair-Headed One. His life was recorded in the manuscript Lives of Finn Barr. The parish church of Fowey in Cornwall is dedicated to him, as St Fimbarrus. This Cornish church was built c. 1170 by William Fitzturold, the name of the patron saint being given as Barrianus.

The present church of St Mary and St Barlock was built piecemeal over a period of about 200 years. The chancel is the earliest part of the church, and is unusually large in relation to the rest of the fabric. It is 46 feet (14 m) long, and is both wider and higher than the nave (which at 49 feet (15 m) is slightly longer). The design of the chancel windows' tracery indicates a building date of c. 1300–1310, as does the contemporary armorial glass. Two of the arms depicted are those of Otton de Grandson who left England in 1307, and Robert the Bruce, at war with England from 1306. The roof of the chancel is a later 15th-century wooden construction; external buttresses and internal shafts running up to the roofline indicate that the original design may have intended a fan vault, never built.

The south tower, nave and chapel east of the tower were built by Nicholas Fitzherbert (d. 1473), he or his son Ralph (d. 1483) built the north aisle, and his grandson John Fitzherbert (d. 1513) built the south-west chapel, which was finished in 1517. Much of the stained glass added by the Fitzherberts survives; these are for the most part figures painted in grisaille. In the south-east chapel there is a window showing the donor and his family.

The church was restored in 1841. New open stalls were inserted, replacing the closed pews. It reopened on 7 July 1842.

It was restored again in 1899–1900 at a cost of £3,800 (equivalent to £403,800 in 2025) by Naylor and Sale, architects of Derby. Some work was done by Edwin Haslam of Derby, but the main contractor was W. Gould of Tutbury. It was re-opened in February 1900 by the Bishop of Southwell.

== Fitzherbert memorials ==
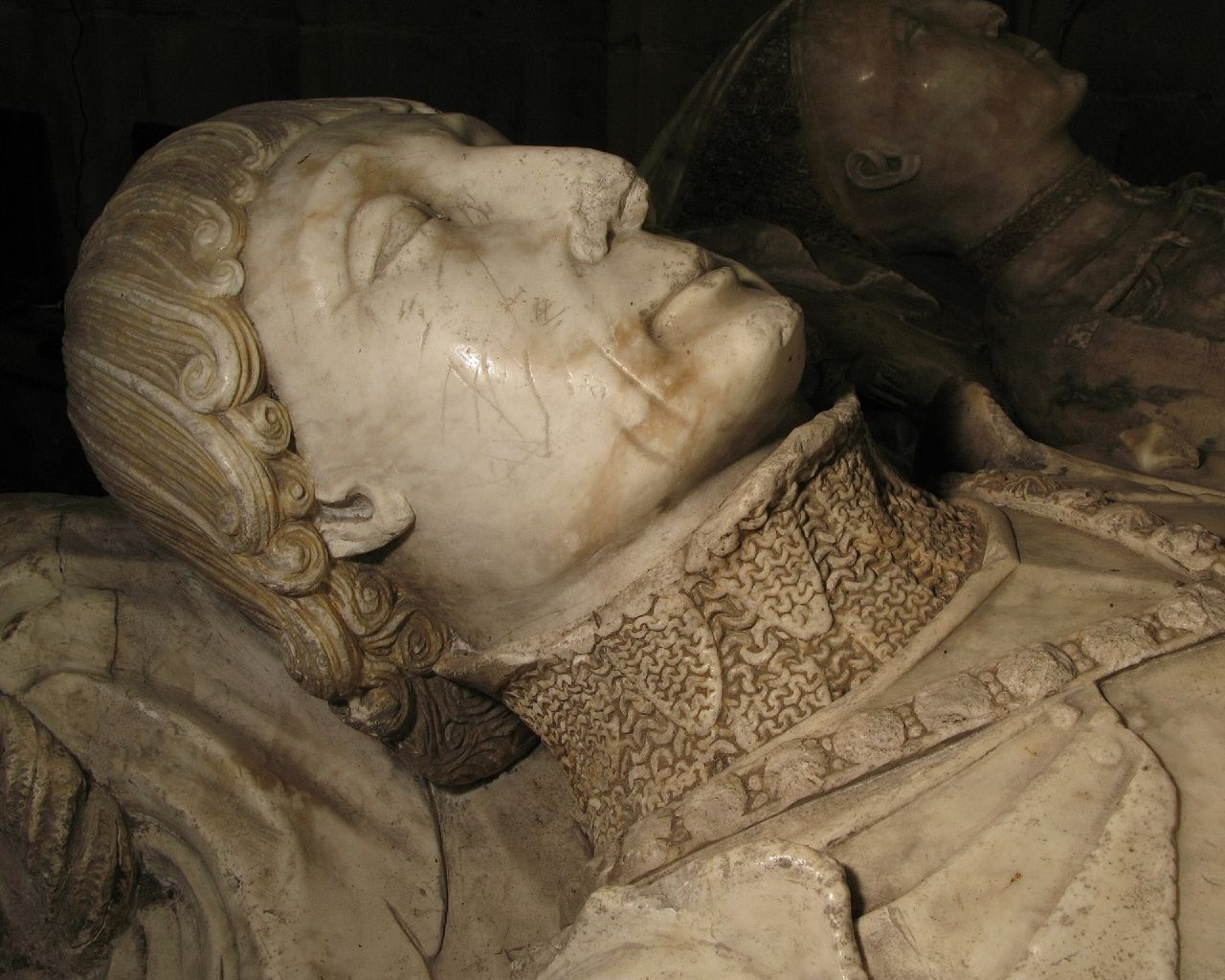
Ralph Fitzherbert in Alabaster

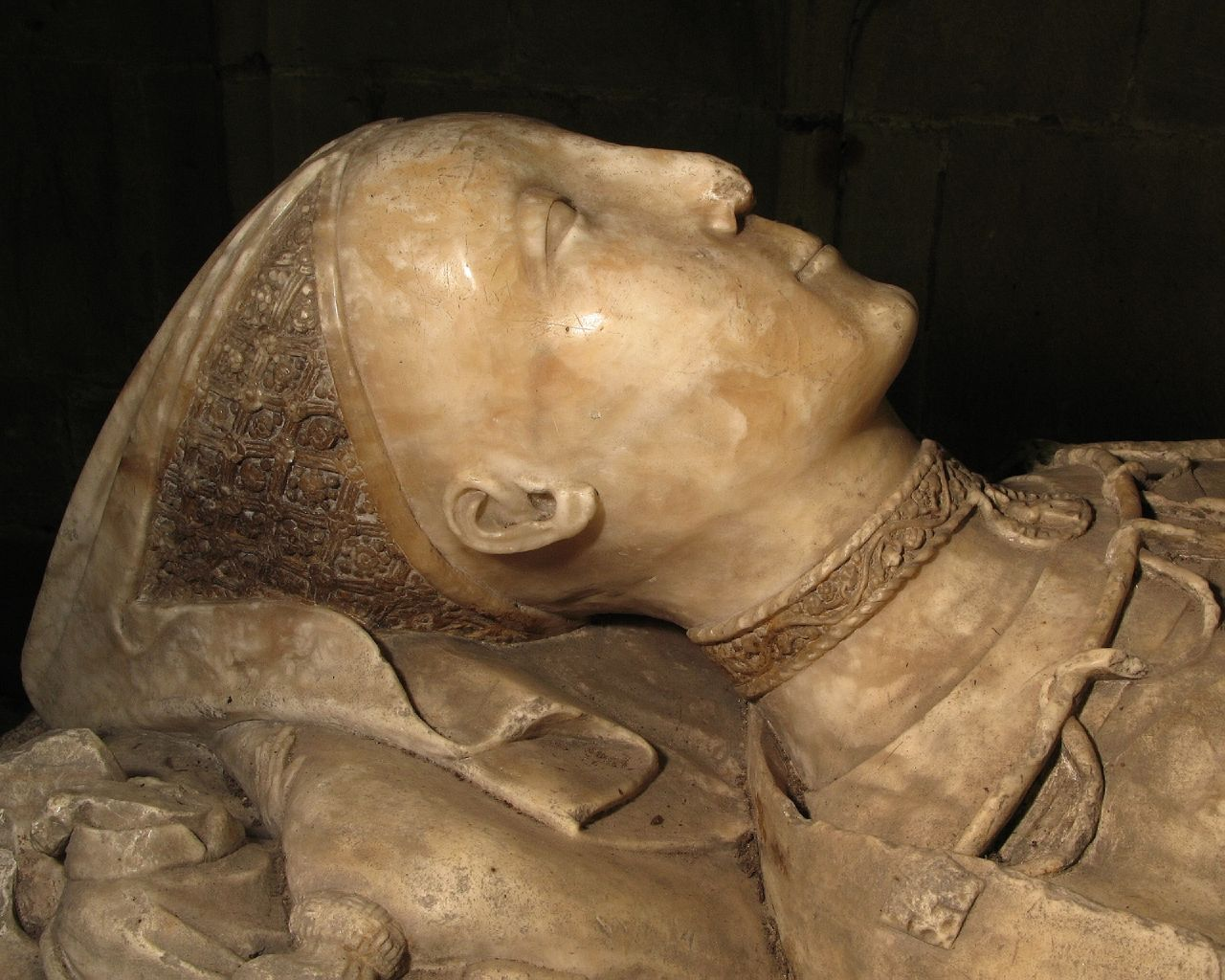
Ralph's wife

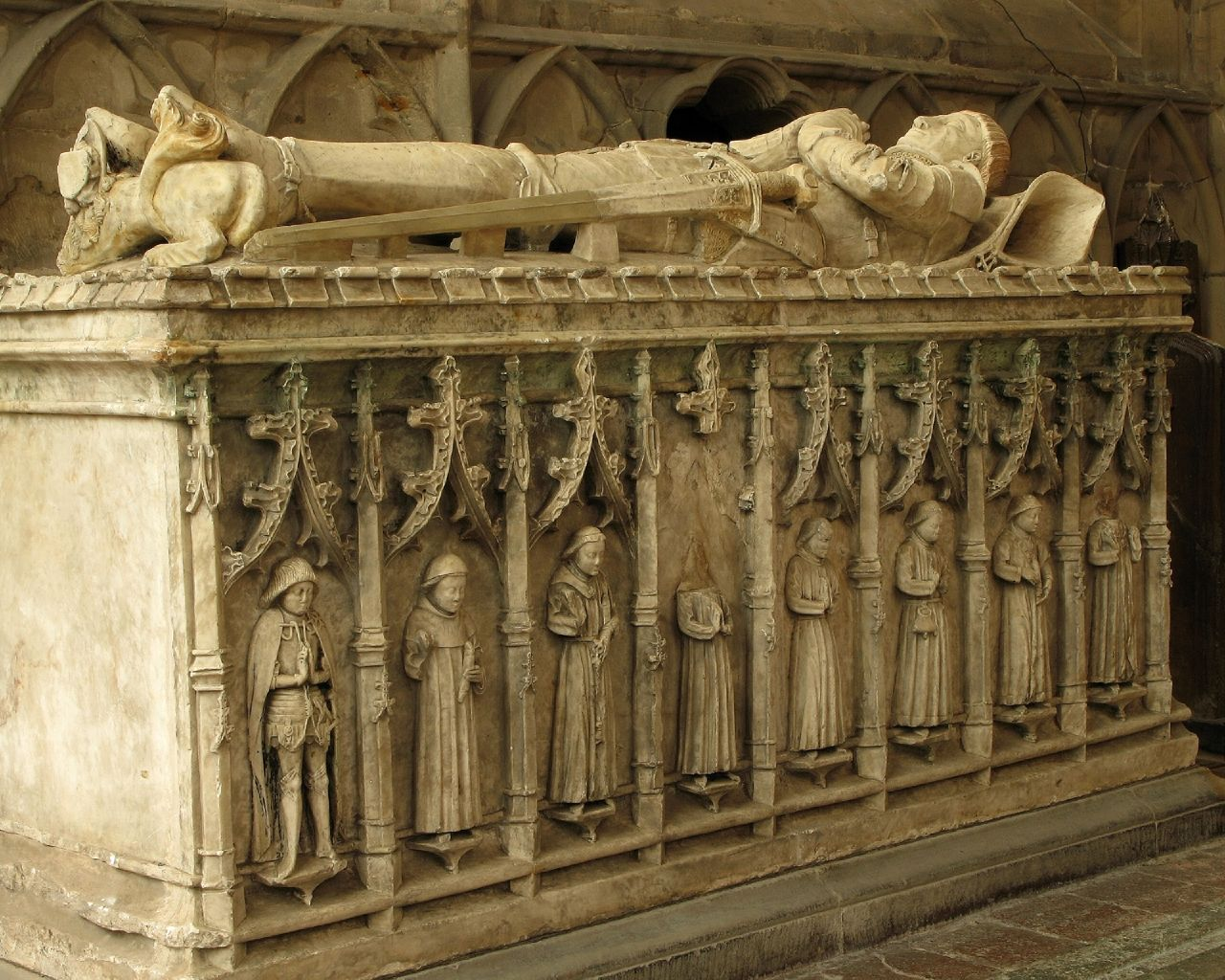
Nicholas Fitzherbert's monument

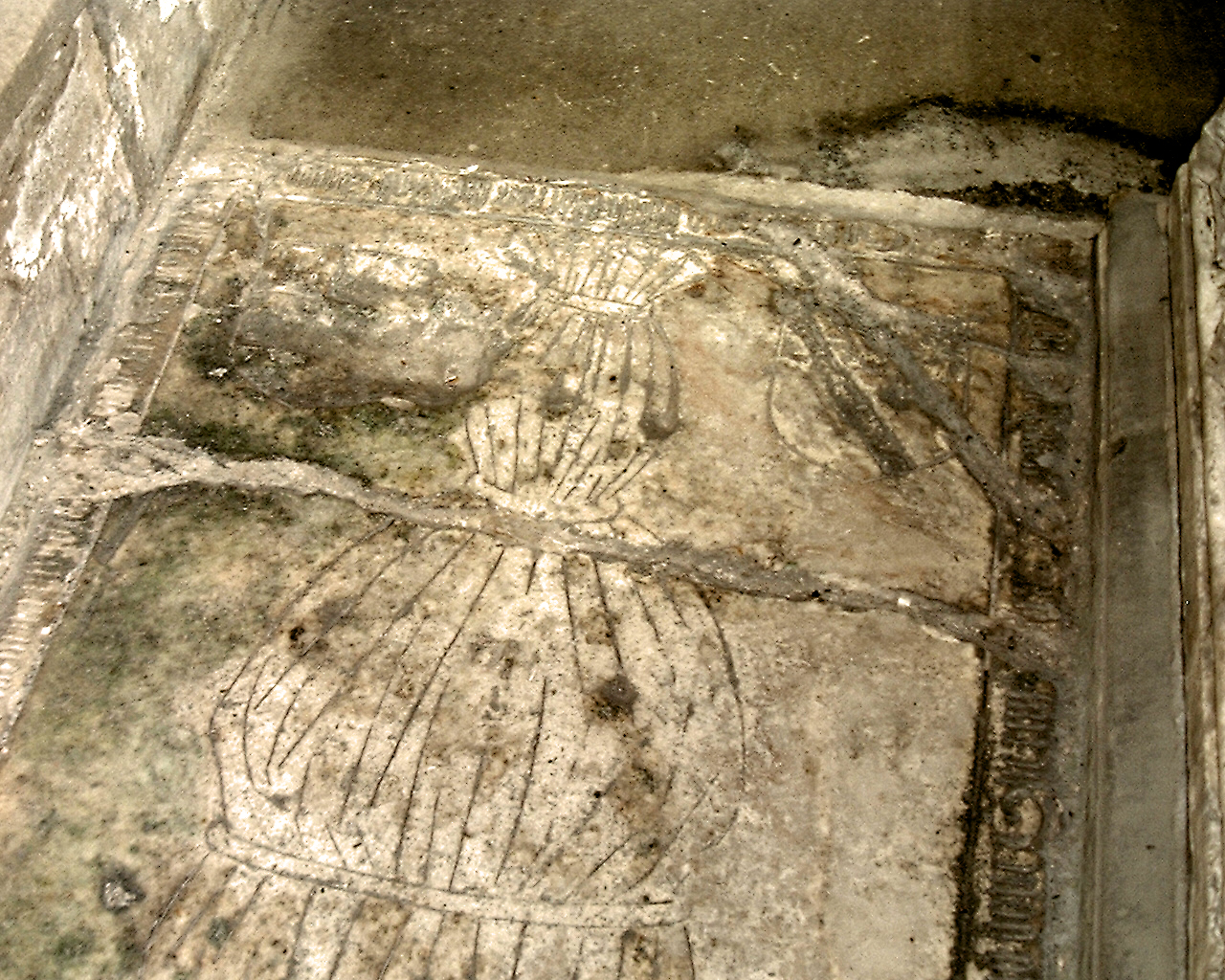
Benedicta Fitzherbert's tomb

There are a number of memorials to the Fitzherbert family in the church, including Sir Henry (d. 1315) depicted as a cross-legged knight, Nicholas (d. 1473) carved in alabaster with attendant mourners, and Sir Ralph Fitzherbert (d. 1483) and his wife, again in alabaster.

The crossed legs of Henry, 6th Lord of Norbury (c. 1275–c. 1315) indicate his profession of Christian faith and not participation in a Crusade; although his year of death is uncertain it is known that he was not a Crusader.

Nicholas Fitzherbert, High Sheriff of Derbyshire and 11th Lord of Norbury, died in 1473. He is shown in full plate armour with a collar of alternating suns and roses with a pendant of the White Lion of the House of Marche, the badge of Edward IV. There is a small angel supporting his right foot.

Ralph's feet rest on a lion; next to it and under Ralph's shoe crouches the small figure of a bedesman. The bearded bedesman is telling his rosary for the souls of the departed. Ralph bears the Yorkist livery collar of alternating suns and roses, with the White Boar of Richard III as a pendant. Since the destruction by fire of the wooden effigy of Ralph Neville (d. 1484) at Brancepeth, this is the only surviving representation of a boar pendant.

The armour portrayed on the effigy of Ralph Fitzherbert has been reproduced as a fully functional suit of plate.

An incised effigy on an alabaster slab of a woman tied in a shroud has been identified as that of Benedicta (d. 1531), wife of John Fitzherbert, 13th Lord. The effigy is surrounded with four coats of arms, one of which is of the Bradbourne family of Benedicta. Above the figure is a worn inscription with the date 1531.

John Fitzherbert separated from Benedicta early in their marriage. In his will he disinherited Benedicta and denied paternity of her children, stating "…Bennett my wyffe hath been of lewd and vile disposicion and cowde not be content with me but forsaken my houshoolde and company and lyffed in other places where yt pleased her."

The great east window of the chapel originally held 14th-century glass depicting a large scene with full-sized figures. By 1770 the glass was in very bad condition. At that time the rectors of parishes were personally responsible for the financing of repairs to their churches, so the rector of Norbury, the Rev. S. Mills, had the window bricked up with the glass remaining in situ. In 1830 the then rector, the Rev. Thomas Bingham, was approached by a Roman Catholic family of Yorkshire with a view to purchasing the glass. Whether the glass was removed and sold, or stolen (as happened at Haddon Hall), or had disintegrated is not known, but it had disappeared by 1842 when the window was opened up again and filled with 15th-century glass taken from the rest of the church windows.

== Parish status ==
The church is in a joint parish with St Peter's Church, Snelston.

== Organ ==
A pipe organ was built by Charles Lloyd in 1890. A specification of the organ can be found on the National Pipe Organ Register.

== Bells ==
The church tower contains 3 bells, one of 1589 by Henry Oldfield, one of ca. 1500 by Richard Mellours, and the third of 1739 by John Halton.

== See also ==
- Grade I listed churches in Derbyshire
- Grade I listed buildings in Derbyshire
- Listed buildings in Norbury and Roston
