= Norbury and Roston =

Civil parish in Derbyshire, England

Coordinates: 52.978°N 1.818°W

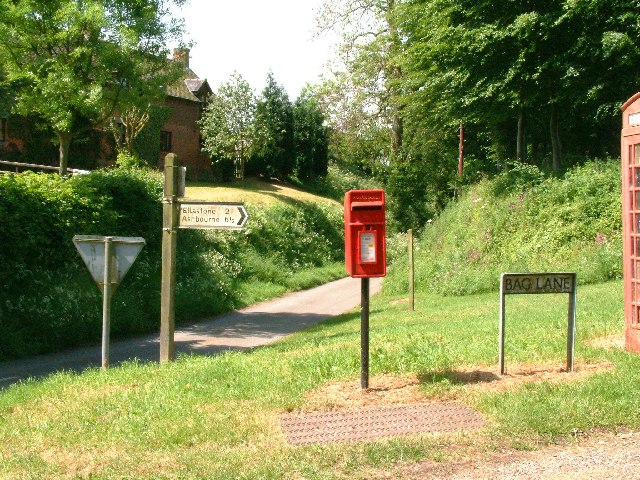
- Street furniture at The Hollow

- Location within Derbyshire
- OS grid reference: SK123423
- Civil parish: Norbury and Roston
- District: Derbyshire Dales
- Shire county: Derbyshire
- Region: East Midlands
- Country: England
- Sovereign state: United Kingdom
- Post town: ASHBOURNE
- Postcode district: DE6
- Police: Derbyshire
- Fire: Derbyshire
- Ambulance: East Midlands

Norbury and Roston is a civil parish in west Derbyshire incorporating the villages of Norbury and Roston.

== See also ==
- Listed buildings in Norbury and Roston
