= Anthony Fitzherbert =

English judge, scholar and legal author (1470–1538)

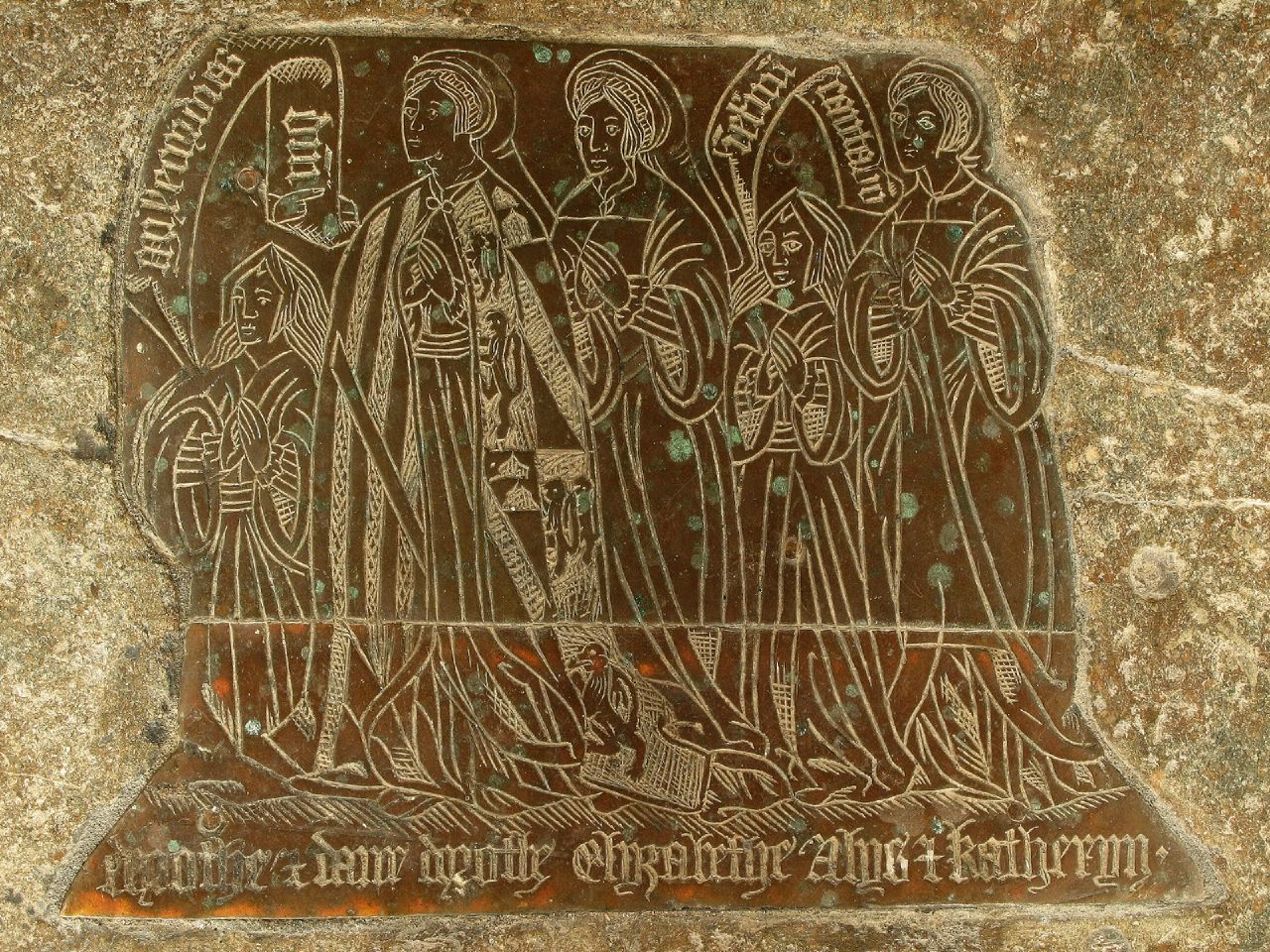
- Monumental brass in chancel floor of Norbury Church to Anthony Fitzherbert and his wife. The foremost standing lady wears a mantle on which are shown the following arms: Gules, three lions rampant or (FitzHerbert of Tissington) quartering: Argent, a chief vairy gules and or overall a bend sable (FitzHerbert of Swynnerton)
- Born: 1470; Norbury
- Died: 27 May 1538 (aged 67–68)
- Resting place: Norbury
- Occupation: Judge
- Spouses: Dorothy Willoughby; Matilda Cotton
- Parent(s): Ralph Fitzherbert and Elizabeth Marshall

Sir Anthony Fitzherbert (1470 – 27 May 1538) was an English judge, scholar and legal author, particularly known for his treatise on English law, New Natura Brevium (1534).

== Biography ==
Fitzherbert was the sixth son of Ralph Fitzherbert of Norbury, Derbyshire, and Elizabeth Marshall. His brothers died young so he succeeded his father as Lord of the manor of Norbury, an estate granted to the family in 1125. Wood states that he was educated at Oxford, but no evidence of this exists; nor is it known at which of the inns of court he received his legal training, though he is included in a list of Gray's Inn readers.

Fitzherbert was called to the degree of serjeant-at-law, 18 November 1510, and six years later he was appointed king's serjeant. In 1514 he published La Graunde Abridgement, described below. In 1522 he was made a judge of common pleas and was knighted; but his new honours did not check his literary activity and in the following year (1523) he published three works: one on law, Diversité de courtz et leur jurisdictions (tr. by Hughes in 1646); one on agriculture, The Boke of Husbandrie; and one of law and agriculture combined, The Boke of Surveyinge and Improvements. All three were frequently reprinted and though Sir Anthony's authorship of the Boke of Husbandrie was formerly questioned it is now regarded as established. Meanwhile, his integrity and ability caused much business to be entrusted to him.

In 1524 Fitzherbert was sent on a royal commission to Ireland; Archbishop Warham appointed him by will sole arbitrator in the administration of his estate; and, in 1529, when Wolsey fell, he was made a commissioner to hear chancery causes in place of the chancellor, and he subsequently signed the articles of impeachment against him. As one of the judges he unwillingly took part in the trials of the martyrs Fisher, More, and Haile, but he strongly disapproved of the king's ecclesiastical policy, particularly the suppression of the monasteries and he bound his children under oath never to accept or purchase any abbey lands.

In 1534, he published La Novelle Natura Brevium, and his last works L'Office et Auctoryté des justices de peas (1538), the first complete treatise on the subject, and The Offices of Sheryffes, Bailliffes, Escheatours, Constables, and Coroners.

Sir Anthony was twice married, first to Dorothy Willoughby who died without issue, and secondly to Matilda Cotton by whom he had a large family. His descendants remained Catholic and still own his estate of Norbury as well as the family seat at Swynnerton.

== Work ==
=== La Graunde Abridgement, 1514 ===
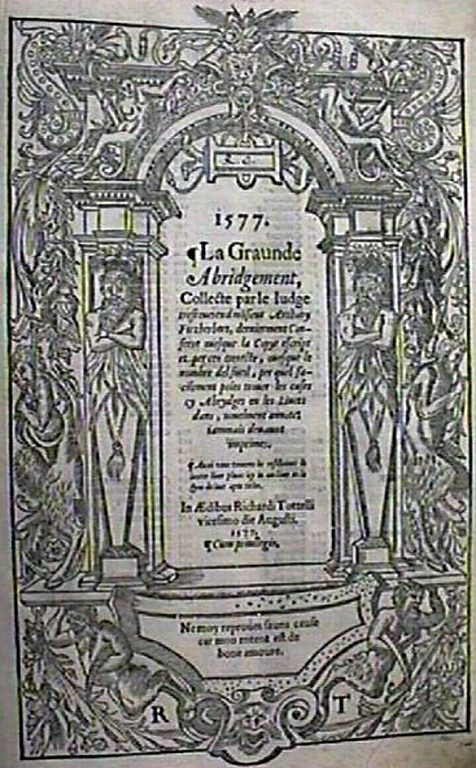
1577 edition of La Graunde Abridgement, 1518

Fitzherbert in 1514 published La Graunde Abridgement, a collection of cases compiled out of the Year Books. This was the first systematic attempt to provide a summary of English law.

It has often been reprinted, both entire and in epitomes, besides forming the foundation of all subsequent abridgments. He also brought out an edition of "Magna charta cum diversis aliis statutis" (1519).

It was held by Fitzherbert J, as early as 1536 (YB 27 Hy VIII Mich pl 10) that a member of the public could sue for a common or public nuisance if he could show that he had suffered particular damage over and above the ordinary damage suffered by the public at large. To the present day, causing a public nuisance has been treated as both a crime and a tort, the ingredients of each being the same.

Attributed in Year Book 26 Hen 8 TT, p 4 c 15 (ed 1679) to Fitzherbert J: "for one can create common appurtenant at this day, and one can alienate it, and sever it from the land to which it is appurtenant ..." The author comments, at p 273, that "the passage ... must be understood as applying only to common appurtenant for a certain number".

=== La Novelle Natura Brevium, 1534 ===
La Novelle Natura Brevium was a treatise on English law by Fitzherbert, described as "that exact work, exquisitely penned", It is often cited in judgments today across the common law world, and represents an important tract on the rules of common law in the 16th century. It remained one of the classical English law books until the end of the 18th century.

Fitzherbert, in his new Natura Brevium (1534) 94D, says that:"If a smith prick my horse with a nail, I shall have my action on the case against him, without any warranty by the smith to do it well"; and he supports it with an excellent reason: "for it is the duty of every artificer to exercise his art rightly and truly as he ought".

=== Boke of Husbandry, 1523/34 ===
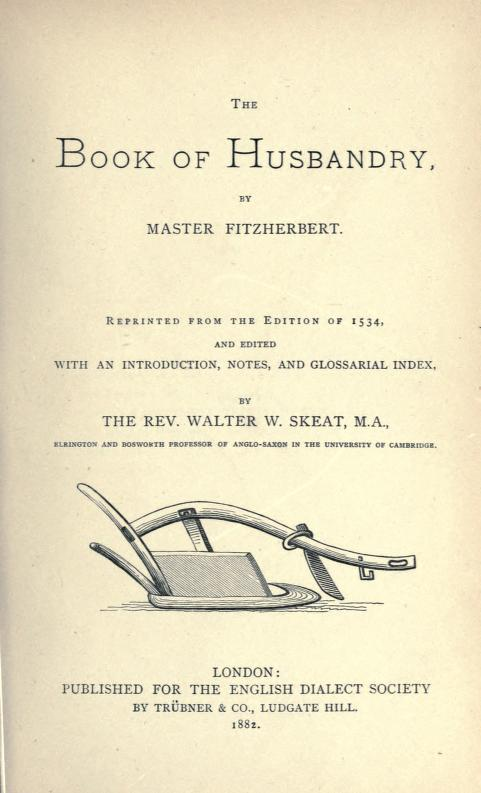
Title page of the 1882 reprint of edition of 1534.

Fitzherbert's Boke of Husbandry, published in 1523/34, is one of the classics of English agriculture, and justly, for it is full of shrewd observation and deliberate wisdom expressed in a virile style, with agreeable leaven of piety and humour. Fitzherbert anticipated a modern poet, Henley, in one of his most happy phrases: Ryght so euery man is capitayne of his owne soule.

The book contains directions for draining, clearing, and enclosing a farm; and for enriching and reducing the soil to tillage. Lime, marl, and fallowing are strongly recommended. The landlords are advised to grant leases to farmers who will surround their farms, and divide them by hedges into proper enclosures; by which operation, he says,

If an acre of land be worth sixpence before it is enclosed, it will be worth eightpence when it is enclosed, by reason of the compost and dunging of the cattle.

Another reason is, that it will preserve the corn without the expense of a herdsman. From the time of the appearance of this work, in 1534, Harte dates the revival of husbandry in England.

The author does not speak of husbandry only, but of other points. The other points are the breeding of horses (not a necessary part of a farmer's business), the selling of wood and timber, grafting of trees, a long discourse upon prodigality, remarks upon gaming, a discussion of "what is riches," and a treatise upon practical religion, illustrated by Latin quotations from the fathers, and occupying no small portion of the work. This is not the work of a practical farmer, in the narrow acceptation of the term, meaning thereby one who farms to live; but it is clearly the work of a country gentleman, rich in horses and in timber, acquainted with the extravagant mode of life often adopted by the wealthy, and at the same time given to scholarly pursuits and to learned and devout reading.

=== The Boke of Surveying and Improvements, 1523/39 ===
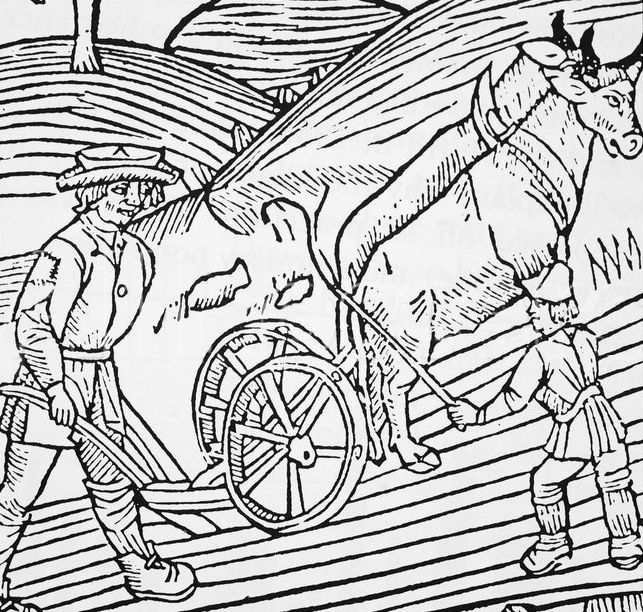
Boke of Surveying woodcut from 1523 title page

While The Boke of Husbandry gave a clear and minute description of the rural practices of that period, from The Boke of Surveying and Improvements, may be learned a good deal of the economy of the feudal system in its decline. The first 1523 editions of the books are very rare. The 1523 edition of the Boke of Husbandry is remarkable for the woodcut upon the title page, representing two oxen drawing a plough with drivers. The author writes from his own experience of more than forty years; and, if we except his biblical allusions, and some vestiges of the superstition of the Roman writers about the influence of the moon. Early 19th century John Claudius Loudon explained:

There is very little of his work that should be omitted, and not a great deal of subsequent science that need be added, with regard to the culture of corn, in a manual of husbandry adapted to the present time. It may surprise some of the agriculturists of the present day, an eminent agricultural writer remarks, to be told that, after the lapse of almost three centuries, Fitzherbert's practice, in some material branches, has not been improved upon; and that in several districts abuses still exist, which were as clearly pointed out by him at that early period, as by any writer of the present age. His remarks on sheep are so accurate, that one might imagine they came from a storemaster of the present day: those on horses, cattle, etc., are not less interesting; and there is a very good account of the diseases of each species, and some just observations on the advantage of mixing different kinds in the same pasture. Swine and bees conclude this branch of the work.

The book further points out the great advantages of enclosures; recommends "quycksettynge, dychynge, and hedgyng;" and gives particular directions about the settes, and the method of training a hedge, as well as concerning the planting and management of trees. We have then a short information "for a yonge gentylman that intendeth to thryve," and a "prolouge for the wive's occupation," in some instances.

Among other things, she is to "make her husband and herself some clothes;" and "she may have the lockes of the shepe, either to make blankettes and coverlettes, or both." This is not so much amiss; but what follows, according to Loudon (1825) will bring our learned judge into disrepute, even with our most industrious housewives:

"... It is a wive's occupation to wynowe all manner of cornes, to make malte, to washe and wrynge, to make heye, shere corne, and, in time of nede, to helpe her husbande to fyll the muckewayne or dounge carte, drive the ploughe, to loade heye, corne, and suche other. And to go or ride to the market, to sel butter, chese, mylke, egges, chekyns, capons, hennes, pygges, gese, and all manner of cornes."

The rest of the book contains some useful advice about diligence and economy; and concludes, after the manner of the age, with many pious exhortations.

== Reception ==
Fitzherbert's treatise on English law, particularly La Novelle Natura Brevium, remained classical English law books until the end of the 18th century. His last works L'Office et Auctoryté des justices de peas (1538), and L'Office de Viconts Bailiffes, Escheators, Constables, Coroners, were the constantly reprinted.

=== Agriculture ===
In the late 18th century Walter Harte (1764) observed, that from the multitude of books published on the subject of cultivating the earth, one would have imagined the art to have been more studied than it really has been. Since upon the whole it continued in a sort of declining condition from the days of Virgil and Columella till the time of Constantine IV, and then lay in a kind of dormant state till about the middle of Henry VIIIth's reign, when it was rather revived than improved.

About the time Anthony Fitzherbert in England published his Natura Brevium, authors as Agostino Gallo, Camillo Tarello, Francesco Sansovino and others in Italy, published several considerable books in agriculture. These Italian writers on husbandry, made the ancients of their country their text and model, and are looked upon to be excellent in language, and no ways defective in experience and knowledge. But Fitzherbert was the first, if we except Crescenzio dell Agricoltura (whose fine performance was printed at Florence in 1478) and Pier Marino, the translator of Palladius de Re Rustica, who made his work public in the year 1528.

Fitzherbert's books on agriculture soon raised a spirit of emulation in his countrymen, and many treatises of the same kind successively appeared. The two treaties on husbandry were republished in 1534 and 1539, and many times beyond, but these versions became the most known. (Note: Multiple 19th century biographies, and even the Encyclopædia Britannica Eleventh Edition (1911) entry on Fitzherbert mention 1534 and 1539 as the publication dates of the husbandry works.) Over time the authorship of the "Boke of Husbandry" and the "Boke of Surveying" have been questioned, whether it was Anthony Fitzherbert or his eldest brother, John Fitzherbert of Norbury, Derbyshire. In the 1882 reprint by the English Dialectic Society the editor professor Walter W. Skeat clearly argued in favour of the former.

== Publications ==
- Anthony Fitzherbert. La Graunde Abridgement, 1514
- Anthony Fitzherbert. Diversité de courtz et leur jurisdictions, 1523 (tr. by Hughes in 1646)
- Anthony Fitzherbert. The Boke of Husbandry, 1523/34; 1882 edition online
- Anthony Fitzherbert. The Boke of Surveyinge and Improvements, 1523/39
- Anthony Fitzherbert. La Novelle Natura Brevium, 1534
- Anthony Fitzherbert. L'Office et Auctoryté des justices de peas 1538
