= La Novelle Natura Brevium =

1534 law treatise by Anthony Fitzherbert

La Novelle Natura Brevium (1534) was a treatise on English law by Anthony Fitzherbert. It is often cited in judgments today across the common law world, and represents an important tract on the rules of common law in the 16th century.

- On skill and care: "If a smith prick my horse with a nail, I shall have my action on the case against him, without any warranty by the smith to do it well"; and he supports it with an excellent reason: "for it is the duty of every artificer to exercise his art rightly and truly as he ought". (94D)
- On deceit: ‘And if a man play with another at dice, and he have false dice with which he playeth, and get the other’s money with these false dice, he who loseth his money may have his action upon the case for this deceit and the form of the writ is such… contriving deceitfully to defraud…’ (950)
- On trespass to land: “If A. and B. have lands adjoining, where there is no enclosure, the one shall have trespass against the other on an escape of their beasts respectively, Dyer 372, Rastal Ent. 621, 20 Ed. 4. 10, although wild dogs, &c., drive the cattle of the one into the lands of the other.” (128)

== See also ==
- Books of authority
- William Blackstone
