= Ralph Fitzherbert =

Sir Ralph Fitzherbert
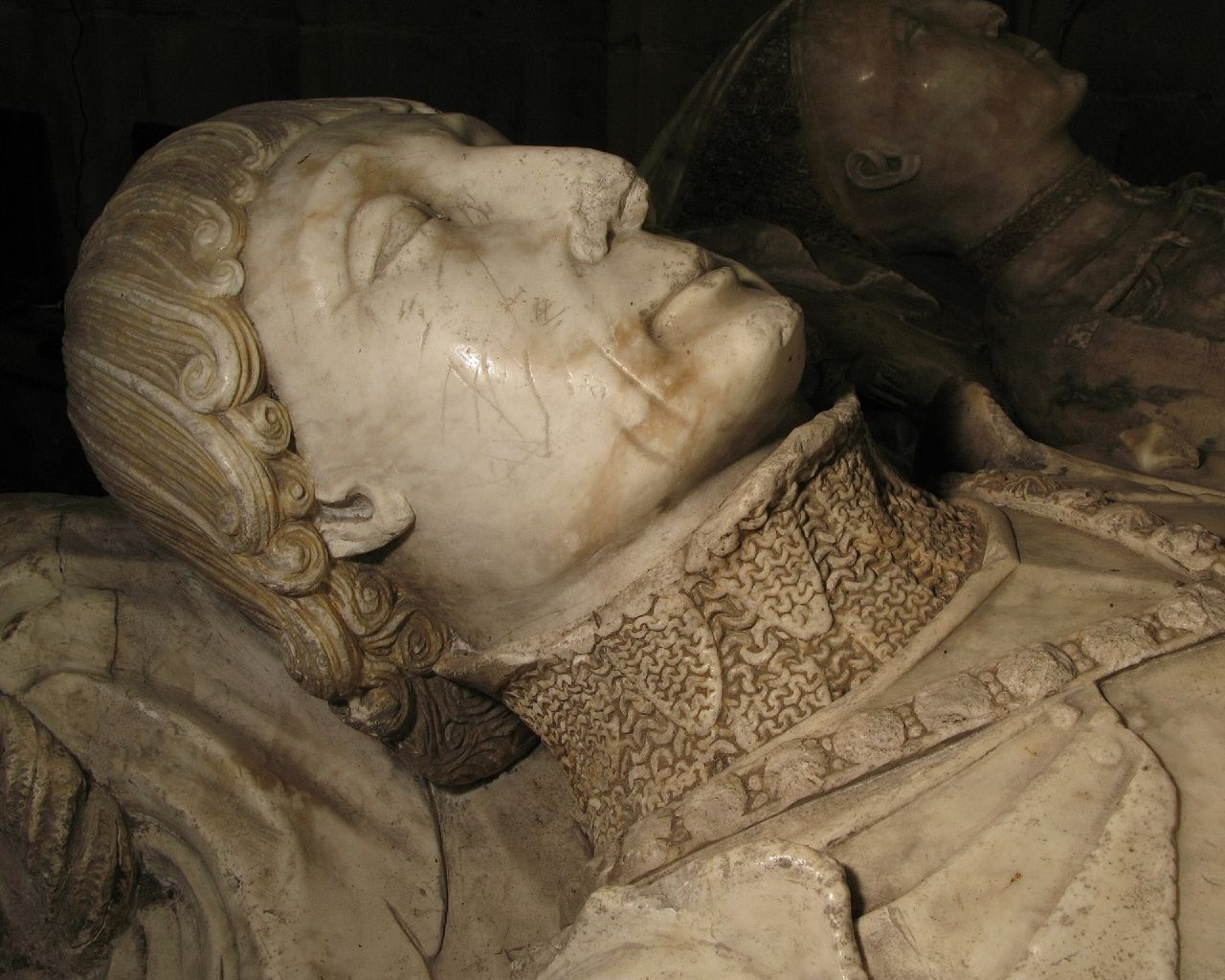
- Alabaster memorial
- Died: 2 March 1483; Norbury, Derbyshire
- Resting place: St Mary and St Barlock's Church, Norbury, Derbyshire
- Title: Lord of Norbury
- Successor: John Fitzherbert
- Spouse: Elizabeth Marshall
- Children: six sons including Anthony Fitzherbert
- Parent(s): Nicholas Fitzherbert and Alice Booth

Sir Ralph Fitzherbert (died 1483) was Lord of the manor of Norbury, Derbyshire. His effigy in his suit of armour at Norbury church are reproduced in the Victoria and Albert Museum, in contemporary armour.

== Biography ==
Fitzherbert was born to Nicholas Fitzherbert and his wife Alice. Ralph's brother was John FitzHerbert of Etwall, King's Remembrancer of the Exchequer. In 1442 Nicholas Fitzherbert and his son and heir, Ralph, gave all their lands at Osmaston and other lands at Foston and Church Broughton in exchange for Norbury. The Fitzherberts held it until 1872. Norbury had been rented by Fitzherberts ancestors since 1125 on a yearly rent of 100 shillings.

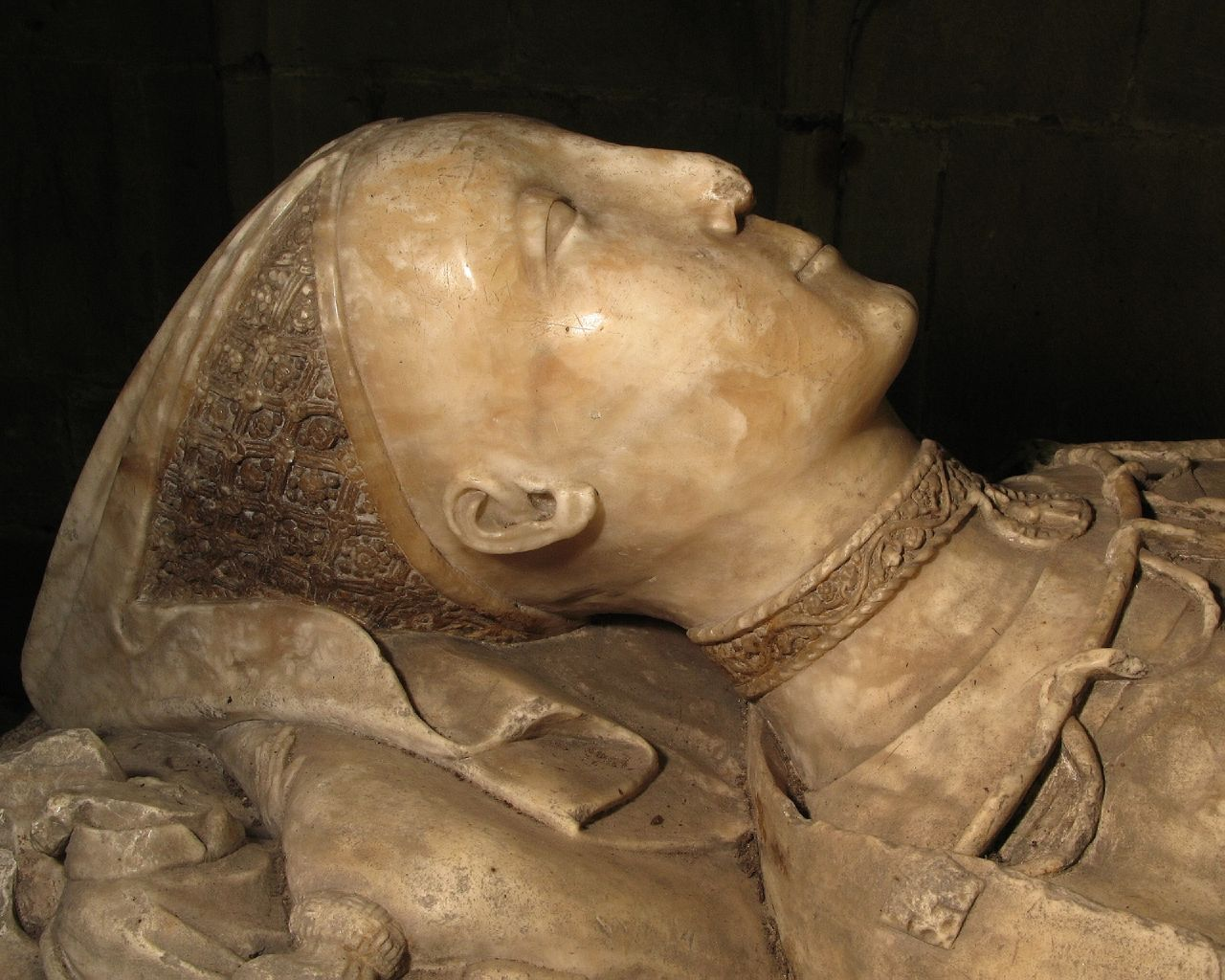
Elizabeth died October 1490.

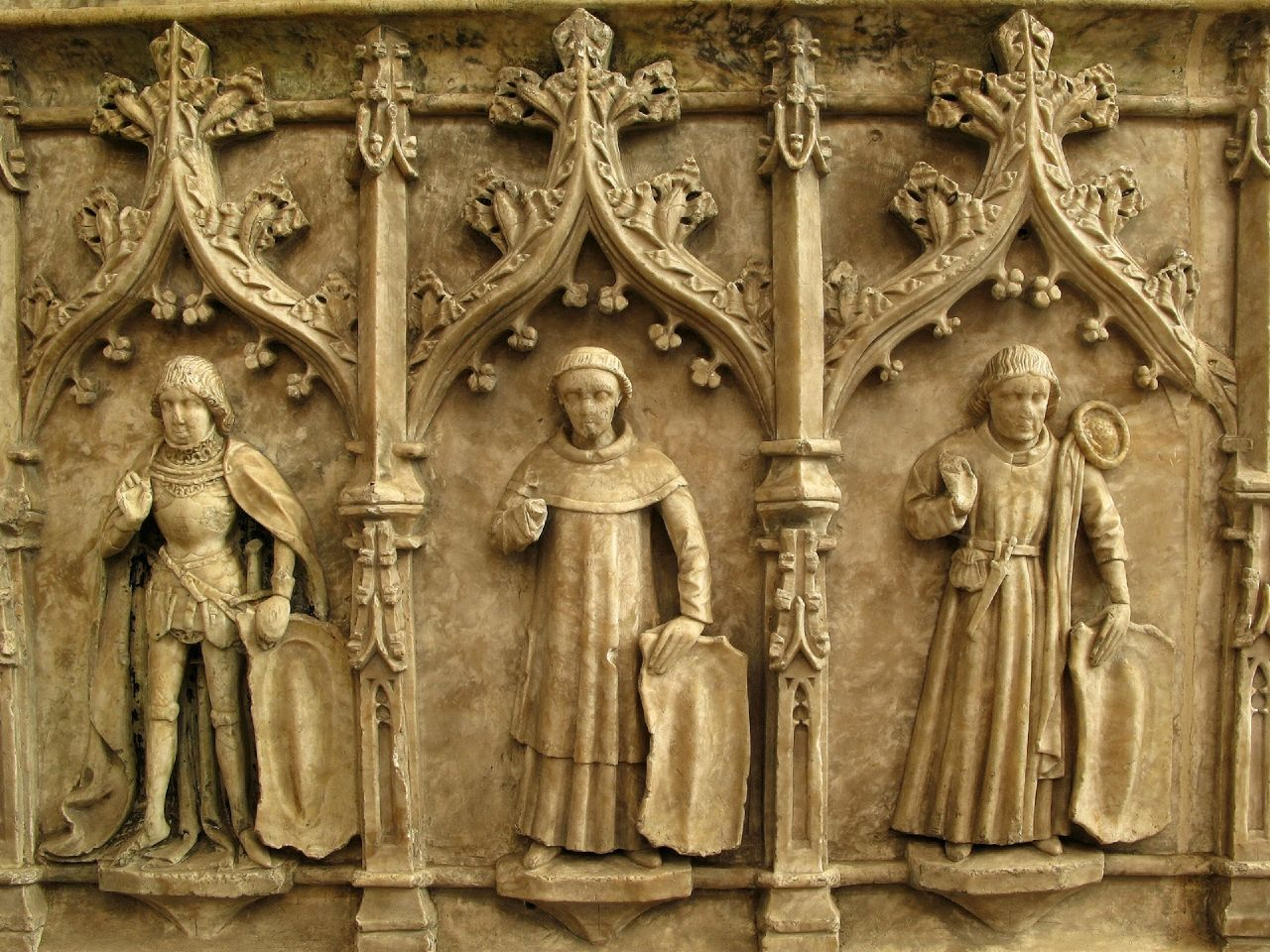
Richard, Thomas and John Fitzherbert on the tomb

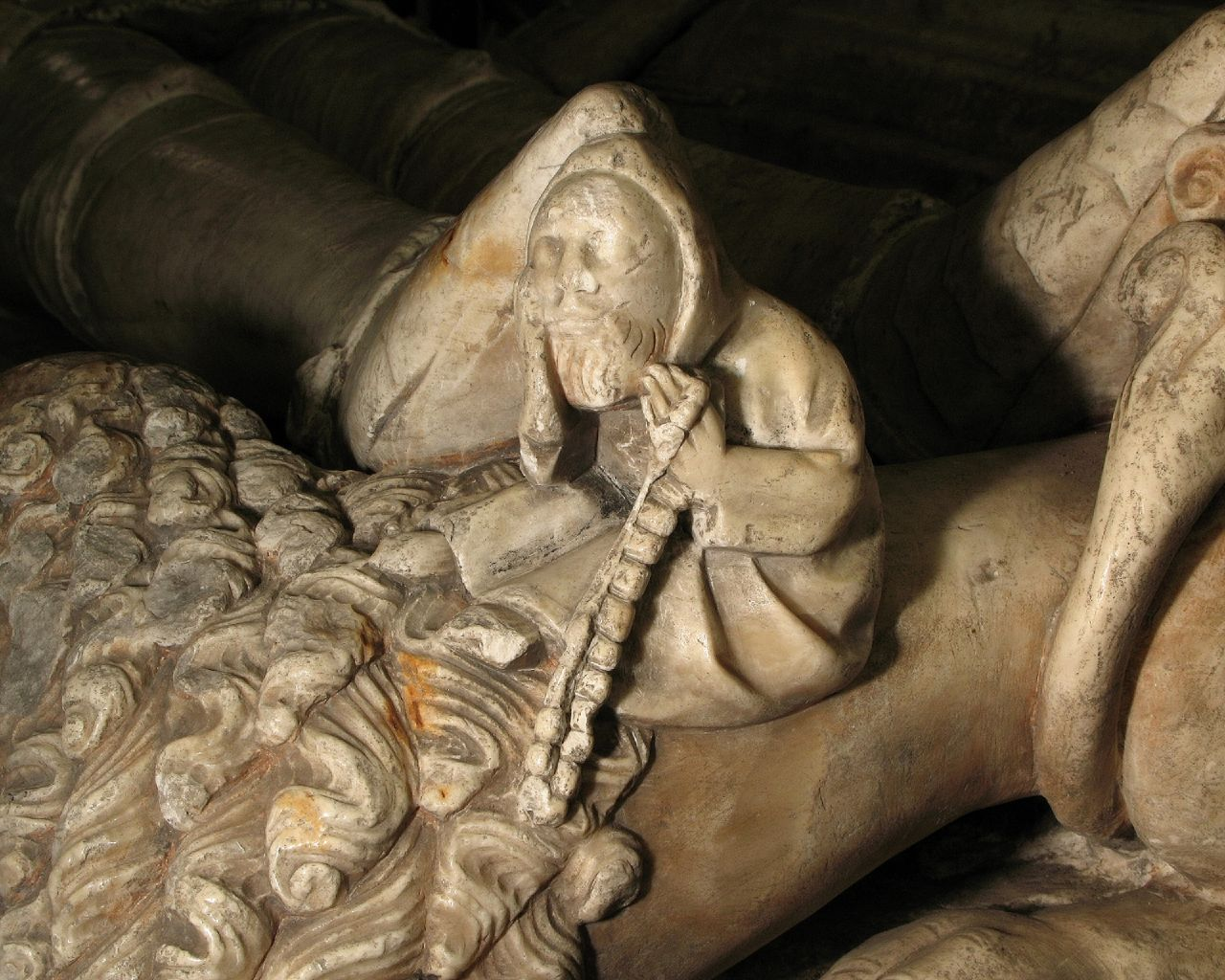
The bedesman

Fitzherbert married Elizabeth Marshall who was an heiress to Upton in Leicestershire. Elizabeth had a number of children: Margaret (who married Reginald Rowe), Dorothy (who married Thomas Comberford), Edith (who married Thomas Babington of Dethick), John (died 1531), Henry (died before 1532), Thomas (died 1532), Richard, William, and Anthony. So many of his sons died young, that it was his sixth son, Anthony, who eventually succeeded him as Lord of the manor of Norbury. The seven sons are shown as figures on the side of Ralph's memorial. They are not shown in the order of their birth. First is shown Richard, who became a knight of Rhodes, and then Thomas, who was the rector of Norbury from 1500 to 1518 and precentor of Lichfield Cathedral. The third figure is thought to be John, who was the heir and is thought to have commissioned the memorials for his parents and his grandfather in Nottingham Alabaster. The fourth to be shown is Henry, with a purse, who was a mercer (a cloth and textile dealer) in London. The final three are thought to include William, prebendary of Hereford Cathedral and Lincoln Cathedral and Chancellor of Lichfield as well as being rector of Wrington in Somerset, and Anthony, who was the most notable. Anthony and William were boys when their mother's will, dated 14 October 1490, was read. Under the terms of that will, John was required to pay five pounds a year to cover Anthony's studies. This investment led to him being a leading and eminent English judge.

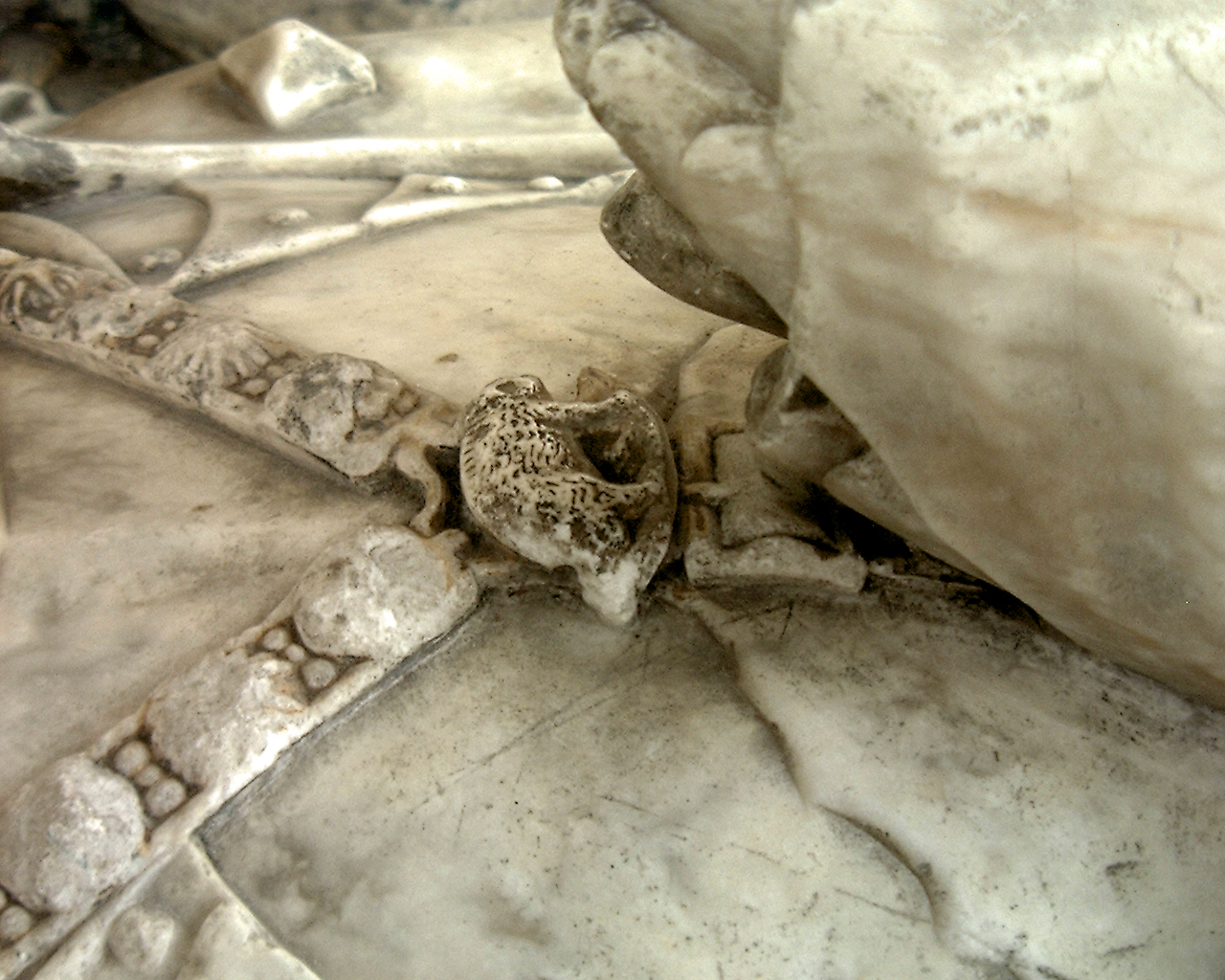
The White Boar livery badge

Both Ralph's and Elizabeth's wills are still available, and her will states that she "should be buried in the church of Saint Barloke before the image of Saint Nicholas and beside the body of her husband, Ralph Fitzherbert."

== Memorial ==
The memorial to Fitzherbert in St Mary and St Barlock's Church, Norbury is well regarded, and is thought to have been made at the same time as the matching memorial to Nicholas Fitzherbert from Chellaston alabaster. Ralph's feet rest on a lion; next to it and under Ralph's shoe crouches the small figure of a bedesman. The bearded bedesman is telling his rosary for the souls of the departed. Ralph bears the Yorkist livery collar of alternating suns and roses, with the White Boar livery badge of Richard III as a pendant. Since the destruction by fire in 1998 of the wooden effigy of Ralph Neville, 2nd Earl of Westmorland (d. 1484) at Brancepeth in County Durham, this is the only surviving representation of a boar pendant, although a number of actual examples have been excavated (See Dunstable Swan Jewel). Fitzherbert died two years before Richard III lost his crown and life in the nearby Battle of Bosworth.

The armour portrayed on the effigy of Ralph Fitzherbert has been reproduced as a fully functional suit of plate The sculptures themselves were copied in the 19th century as plaster casts which are held in the collection of the Victoria and Albert Museum in London.

== Catholicism ==
The bedesman in the memorial illustrates Fitzherbert's beliefs and these continued in his family through his descendants at Padley in Derbyshire (see his great-grandson Nicholas Fitzherbert).
