= Beadsman =

People employed to make special prayers in Medieval Britain

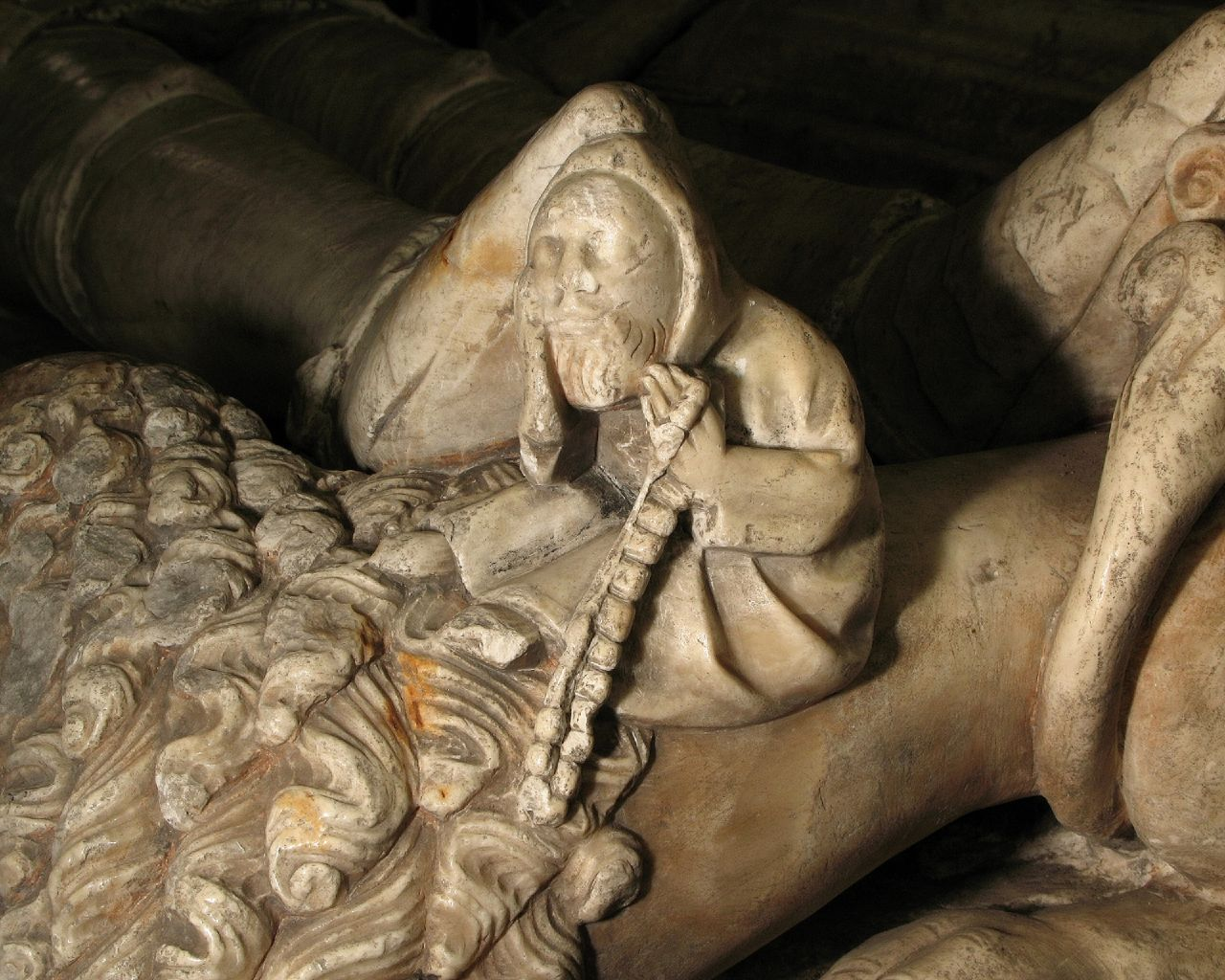
A bedesman carved on the tomb of Ralph Fitzherbert who died in 1483

Bedesman, or beadsman (Middle English bede, 'prayer', from the Old English biddan, 'to pray'; lit. 'a man of prayer'; and from the Anglo-Saxon bed), was generally a pensioner or almsman whose duty was to pray for his benefactor.

== Function ==
A beadsman (or beadswoman) in Medieval times occupied their position as attached to the crown and churches in Scotland and England. In general, the task was to pray for souls listed on a bede-roll represented by small items on a string called 'bedes' (i.e. "prayers"). Souls who wished to be prayed for, secured their listing by giving alms, donations, or gifts. If a departed soul was a member of a guild the chaplain would add them to the roll for prayer post-mortem. In the 12th and 13th centuries, the use of little perforated globes of bone, wood, or amber, threaded on a string, came into fashion for the purpose of counting the repetitions of the Our Father or Hail Mary. These objects themselves became known as 'bedes', later becoming known as 'beads'.

== Bedehouse ==
Beadsmen were sometimes accommodated in a Bedehouse (an alms-house), some of which have survived into modern times. These are generally considered to be buildings of special interest and many are often listed in The National Heritage List for England.

== Royal arrangement ==
In Scotland, there were public almsmen which were supported by the king who were expected to pray for his welfare and that of the state in return. These men wore long blue gowns with a pewter badge on the right arm, and were nicknamed Blue Gowns. Their number corresponded to the king's years, an extra one being added each royal birthday. They were privileged to ask alms throughout Scotland. On the king's birthday, each bedesman received a new blue gown, a loaf, a bottle of ale, and a leathern purse containing a penny for every year of the king's life. On the pewter badge which they wore were their name and the words "pass and repass," which authorised them to ask alms. No more Blue Gown bedesmen were appointed after 1833, and the last recorded payment under these arrangements was made in 1863.

== England ==
In consequence of its use in this general sense of pensioner, "bedesman" was long used in English as equivalent to "servant." The word had a special sense as the name for those almsmen attached to cathedrals and other churches, whose duty it was to pray for the souls of deceased benefactors. A relic of pre-Reformation times, these old men still figure in the accounts of English cathedrals.

St Botolph's Church, Boston in Lincolnshire traditionally appoints four Choral Bedesmen, whose role is to sing the daily services. The posts attracted a nominal stipend until early in the 21st century. The Bedesmen have included female choristers since 2015 and currently (2023) include a singer for each part.

== Elsewhere ==
In a somewhat similar practice in Spain (roughly 14th century onwards), there were blind people hired to sing prayers for customers. Some customers were regulars, others hired these singers only from time to time. Bedesmen existed in Scotland until the late 1990s. The last beadsman in Aberdeen died in 1988.

== See also ==
- Bede
- Bede (disambiguation)
- Bede House, Old Aberdeen
- Hospitals in medieval Scotland
- Lyddington Bede House
