= St Bede's Church =

St Bede's Church may refer to:

- St Bede's Church, Rotherham, South Yorkshire, England
- St Bede's Church, South Shields, Tyne and Wear, England
- St Bede's Church, Widnes, Cheshire, England
- St. Bede's Anglican Church, Kinosota, Manitoba, Canada

== See also ==
- Bede
