= Montalto Reliquary =

Medieval reliquary in enamels

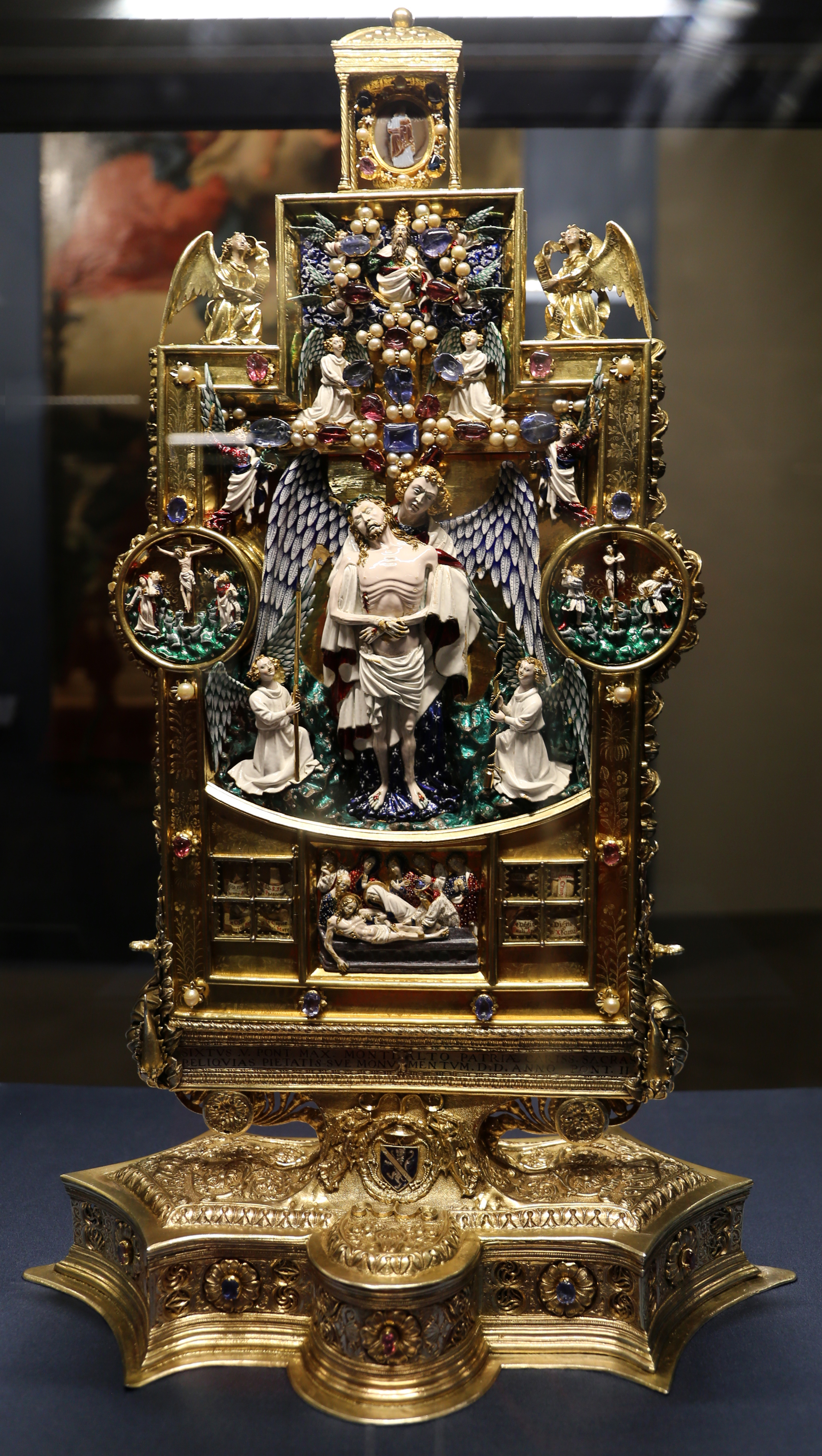
The front of the Montalto Reliquary; 66,5 x 43 x 23 cm

The Montalto Reliquary is an elaborate reliquary in gold, silver, enamel and gemstones, with a central French Late Gothic section of the 1370s, added to by Italian Renaissance goldsmiths around 1460. It was given by Pope Sixtus V in 1586 to the cathedral of his home town Montalto delle Marche, in the Italian Province of Ascoli Piceno in the Marche region, and remains there in the Museo Sistino Vescovile, the episcopal museum.

The older central part of the reliquary was almost certainly made in Paris in the late 14th century for a member of the French Valois royal family, probably by the goldsmith Jean du Vivier and his workshop. It was passed around Europe as a diplomatic gift for the next two centuries, before ending up with the papacy. It is one of a handful of large survivals in the technique of enamels en ronde bosse, where three-dimensional surfaces are coated in vitreous enamel; others include the Holy Thorn Reliquary in the British Museum and the Goldenes Rössl ("Golden Pony") in Altötting, Bavaria. In the 21st century the reliquary has undergone two periods of examination and restoration in Florence, and has been in a number of exhibitions in Italy.

== Description ==
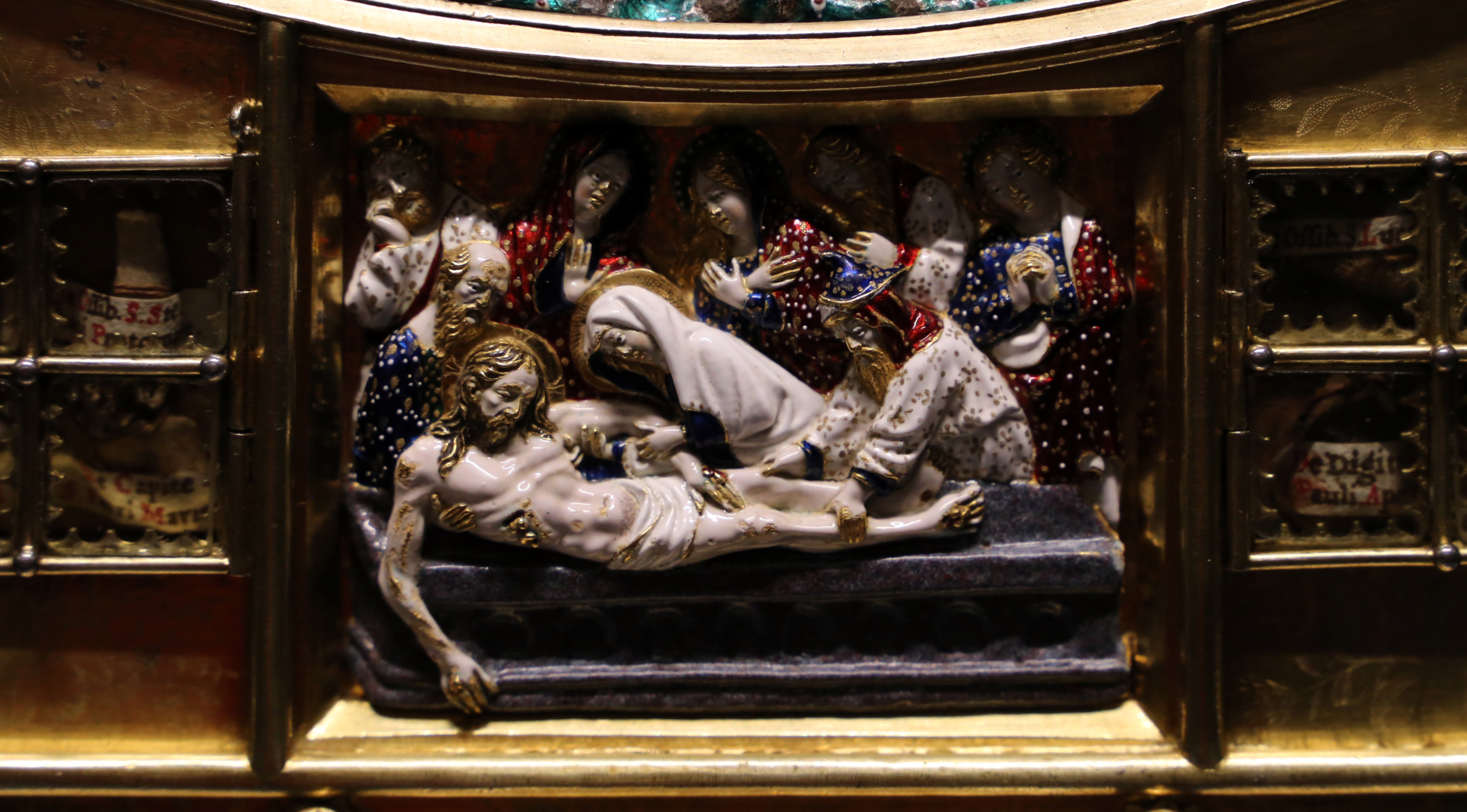
The Lamentation of Christ, with relics at sides

The central part of the reliquary shows the upright but lifeless figure of Christ supported from behind by an angel with outspread wings. A jewelled cross stands behind them. Smaller framed scenes around show the crucifixion and flagellation of Jesus to the left and right, with the Lamentation of Christ below. There are small compartments containing wrapped and labelled relics to either side of the Lamentation. Above the shaft of the cross a small figure of God the Father is accompanied by angels. Right at the top there is an engraved gem of a standing Christ, thought to be Byzantine. Following the additions in the Renaissance it is now impossible to be certain what the surrounding parts of the reliquary originally looked like.

All these elements are within a later gold frame decorated with gems and engraved plant forms. Below this is a later base in gold, including the Barbo coat of arms in black niello, which also appear three times on the back of the reliquary. The whole measures 66.5 cm high, 43 cm wide and 23 cm deep.

== History ==
The central part of the reliquary is identifiable in an inventory of the treasures of King Charles V of France (r. 1364-1380), where is recorded as hanging in the chapel of the Louvre Palace in Paris. After passing through the ownership of the Dukes of Burgundy, it was next recorded as in the possessions of the Habsburg Frederick IV, Duke of Austria on his death in 1439. It may have been acquired by the Habsburg family in connection with the marriage of Leopold IV, Duke of Austria with Catherine of Burgundy, daughter of Duke Philip the Good, in 1393. This marriage was childless, and Leopold's brother Frederick inherited. In 1450 Leonello d'Este, Marquess of Ferrara bought it from a German merchant; he died the same year. By 1457 it belonged to the Venetian Cardinal Pietro Barbo, who was Pope Paul II from 1464 to 1471. He commissioned a workshop in Venice to add the frame, back, and base, which include his Barbo coat of arms three times, surmounted by a cardinal's hat, indicating this work was done before 1464.

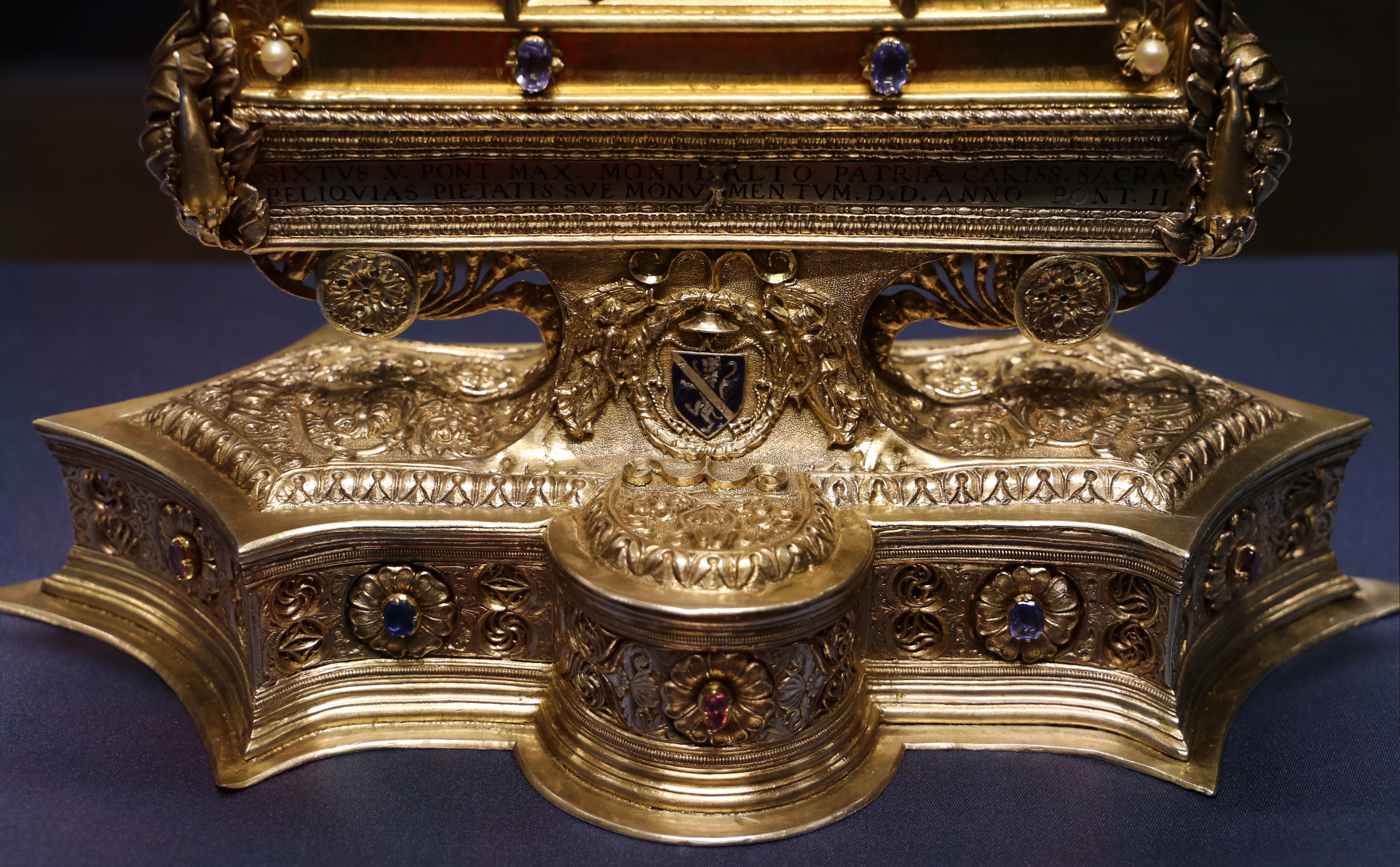
The base, added around 1460

He had an inscription added reading "My owner is Cardinal Pietro Barbo, Venetian and generous scholar; your priest and Bishop, Vicenza". It remained in the Papal treasury until Pope Sixtus V presented it in 1586 to the cathedral of his home town, as a Latin inscription below the frame records:

"SIXTUS V PONT. MAX. MONTI ALTO PATRIAE CARISS. SACRAS RELIQUIAS PIETATIS SUE MONUMENTUM D.D. ANNO PONT II" (Sixtus V Pontifex Maximus gave to Montalto his most dear homeland this holy reliquary as a sign of his affection in the second year of his pontificate)

In 2006 it was exhibited in an exhibition called Gentile da Fabriano and the other Renaissance at the Spedale di Santa Maria del Buon Gesù, Fabriano, Italy. In 2013 it was restored in the Opificio delle Pietre Dure (Precious Stones Workshop) in Florence, with a further period of restoration there from November 2023. This coincided with the closure of the Montalto museum after earthquake damage on 30 October 2016. The reliquary is in an excellent state of conservation, but the enamels, and their adhesion to the metal below (especially in the case of areas with a silver base), need careful monitoring and some local interventions.

After the first period of work was completed it was first part of an exhibition in 2017 at the Uffizi in Florence of art from the Marche threatened by the earthquakes, then placed on display in the Bargello in Florence for a year from September 2017, before returning to Montalto. After the second restoration it was shown in the Florence Museo dell'Opificio delle Pietre Dure for some three months in 2024, then at the Vatican Pinacoteca from 25 June to 19 October 2024, before again returning to Montalto.

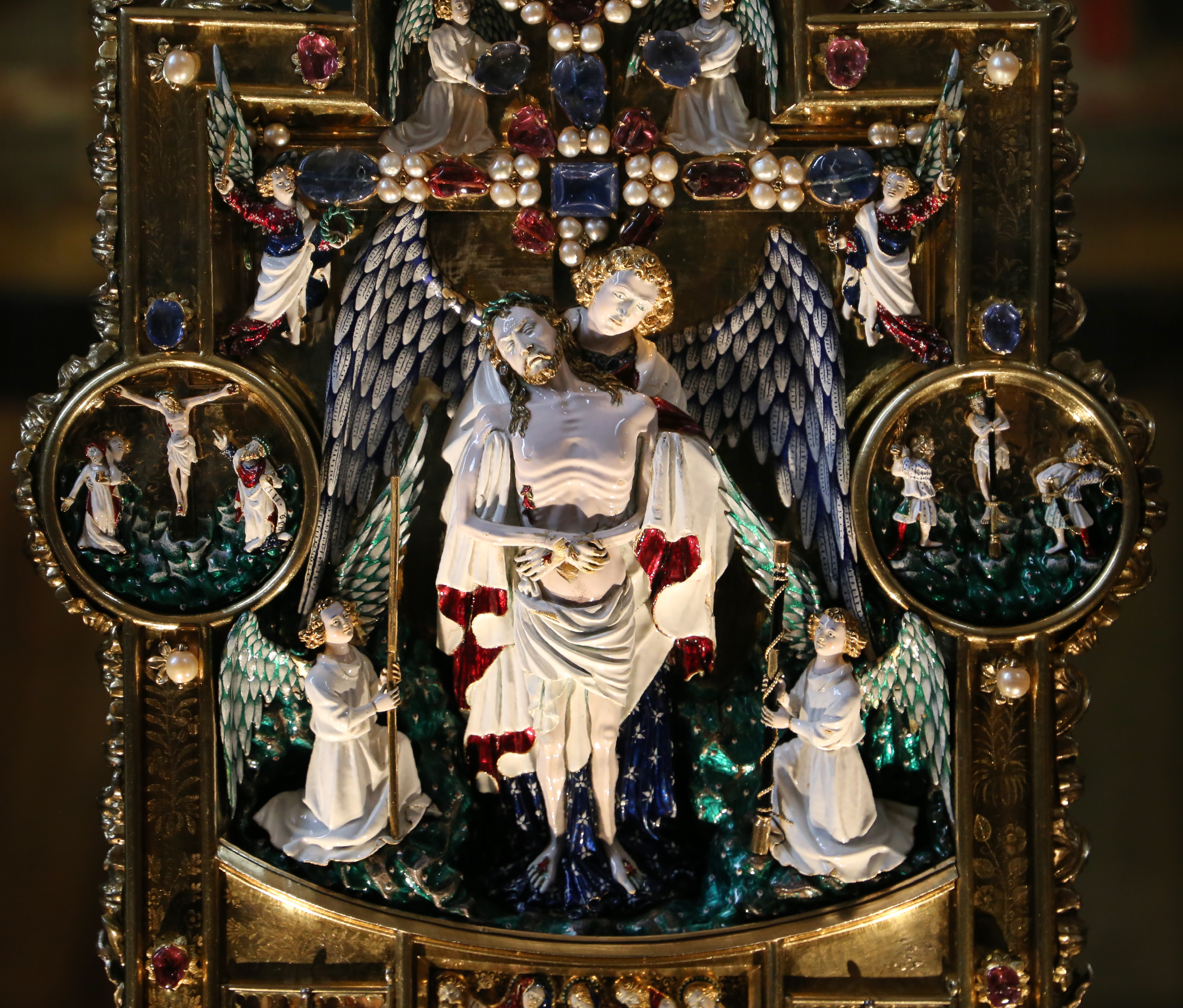
The central figures

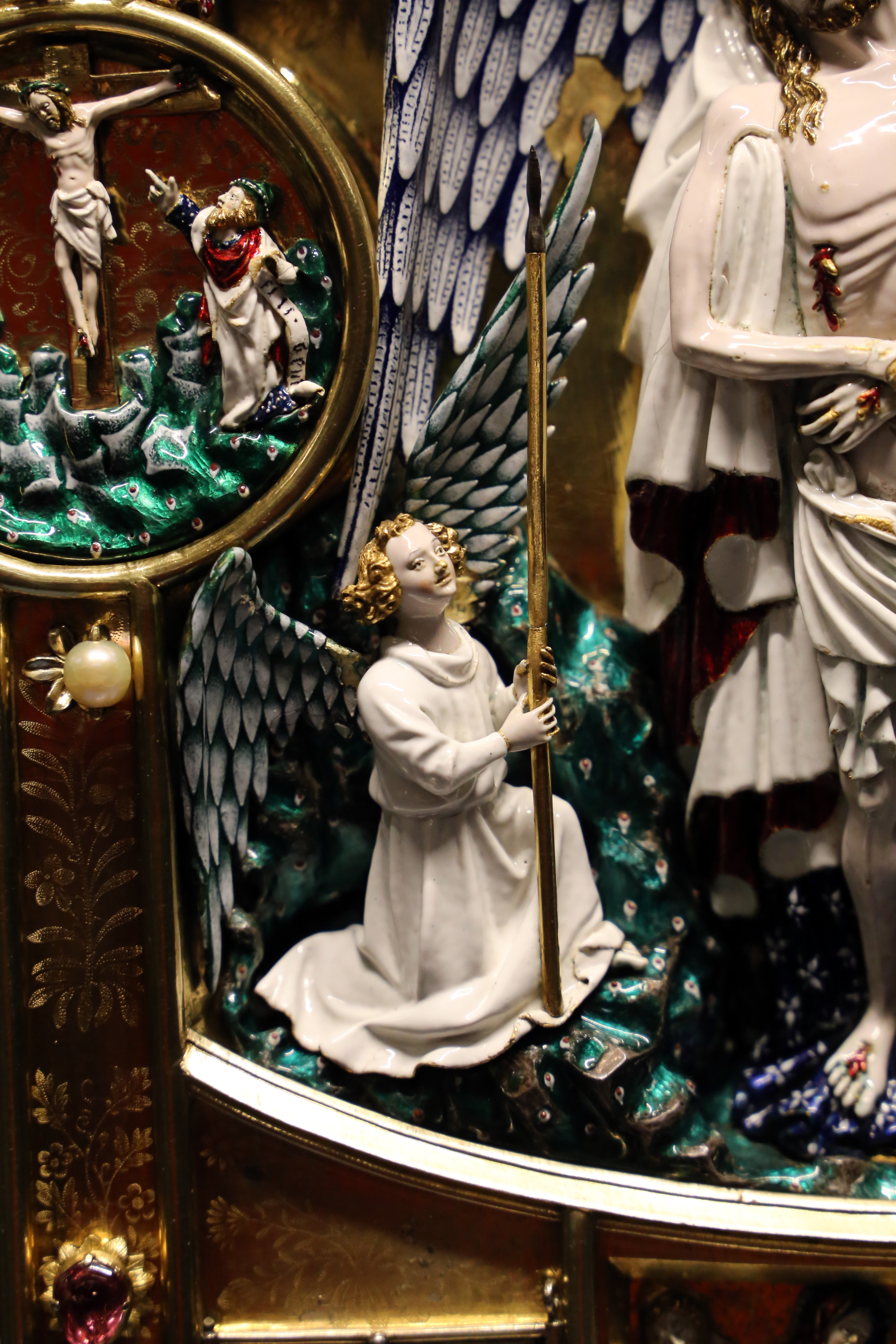
Angel kneeling beside Christ, holding the Spear of Longinus

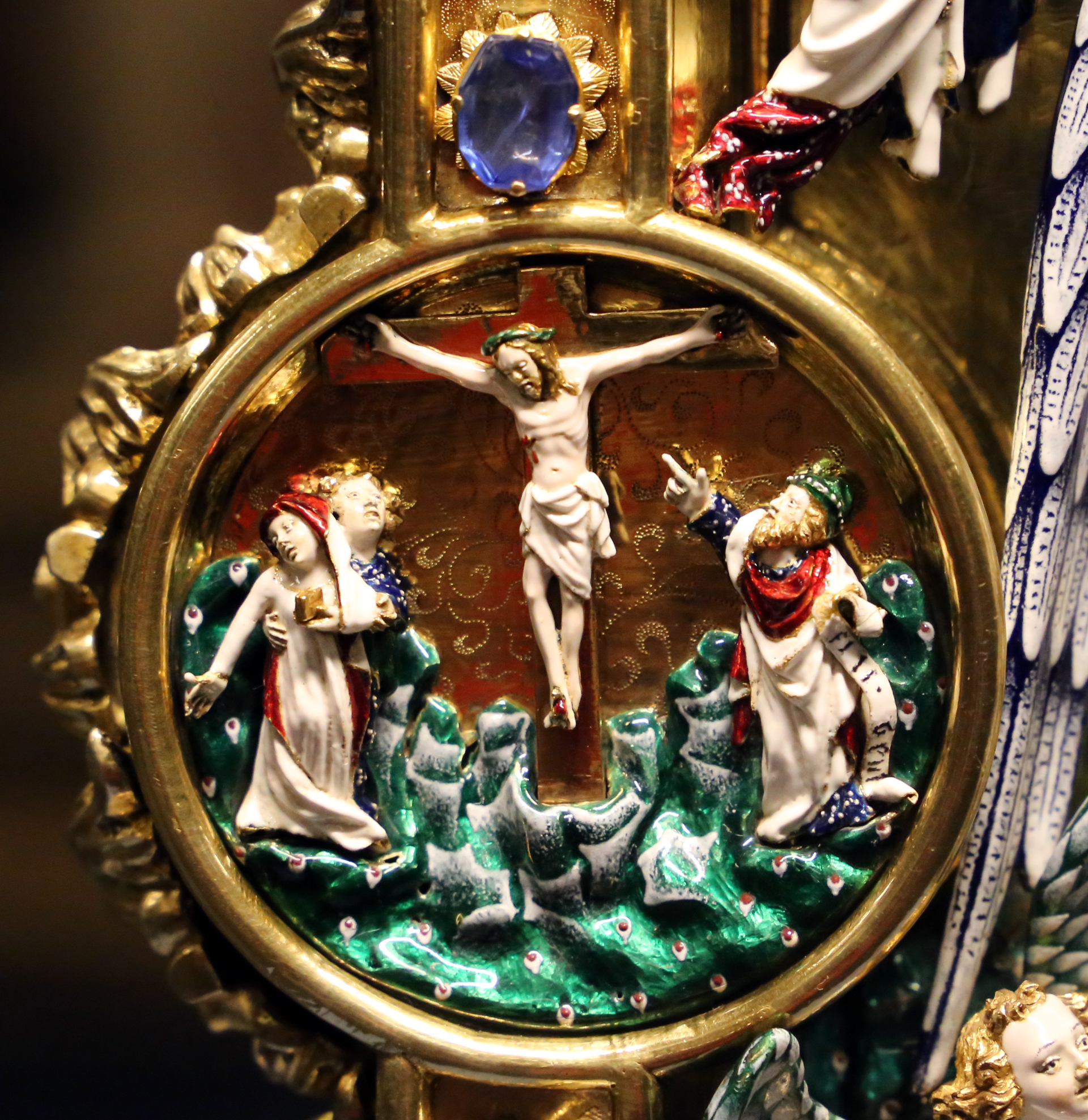
Crucifixion of Jesus

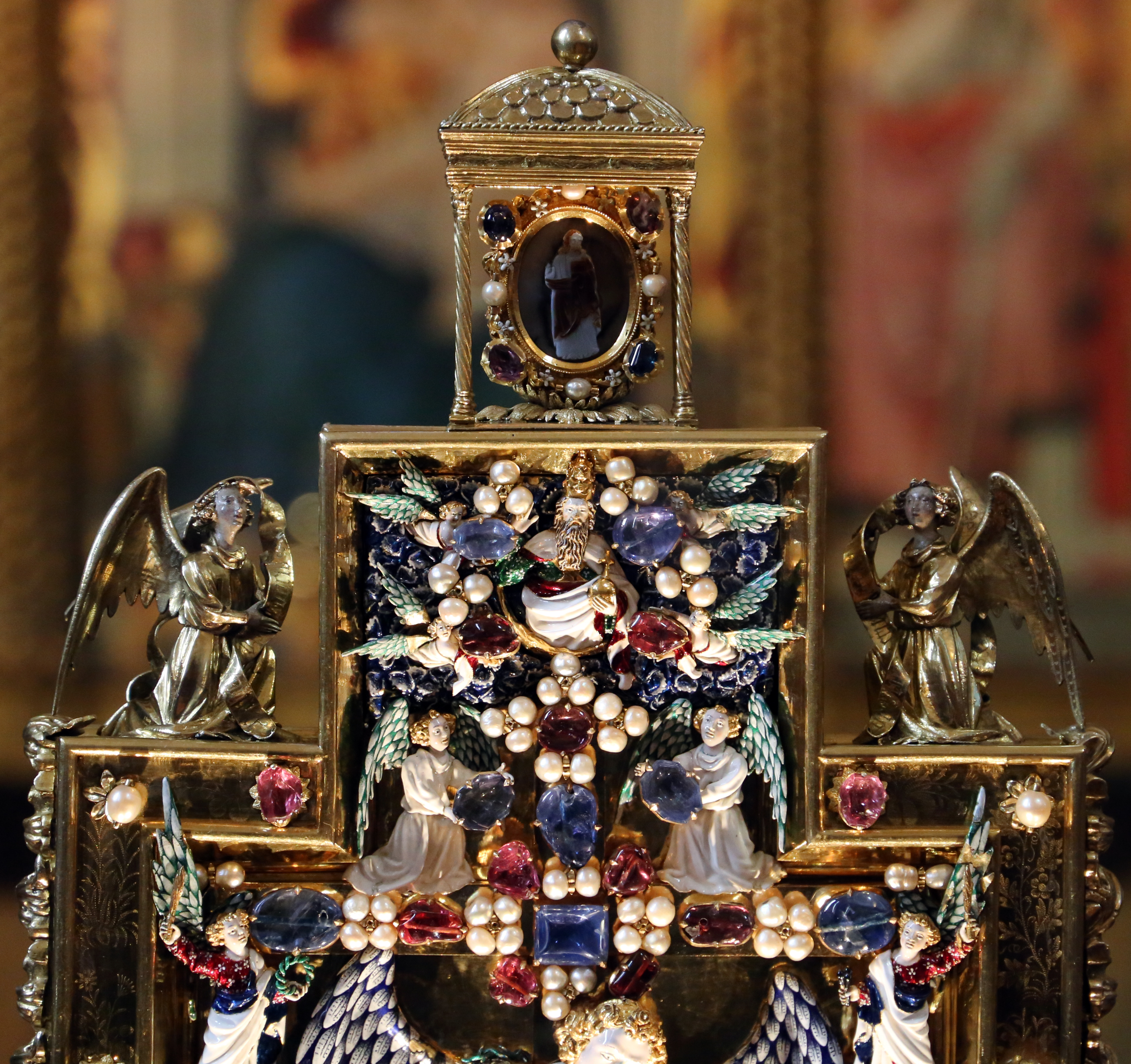
Top of the reliquary

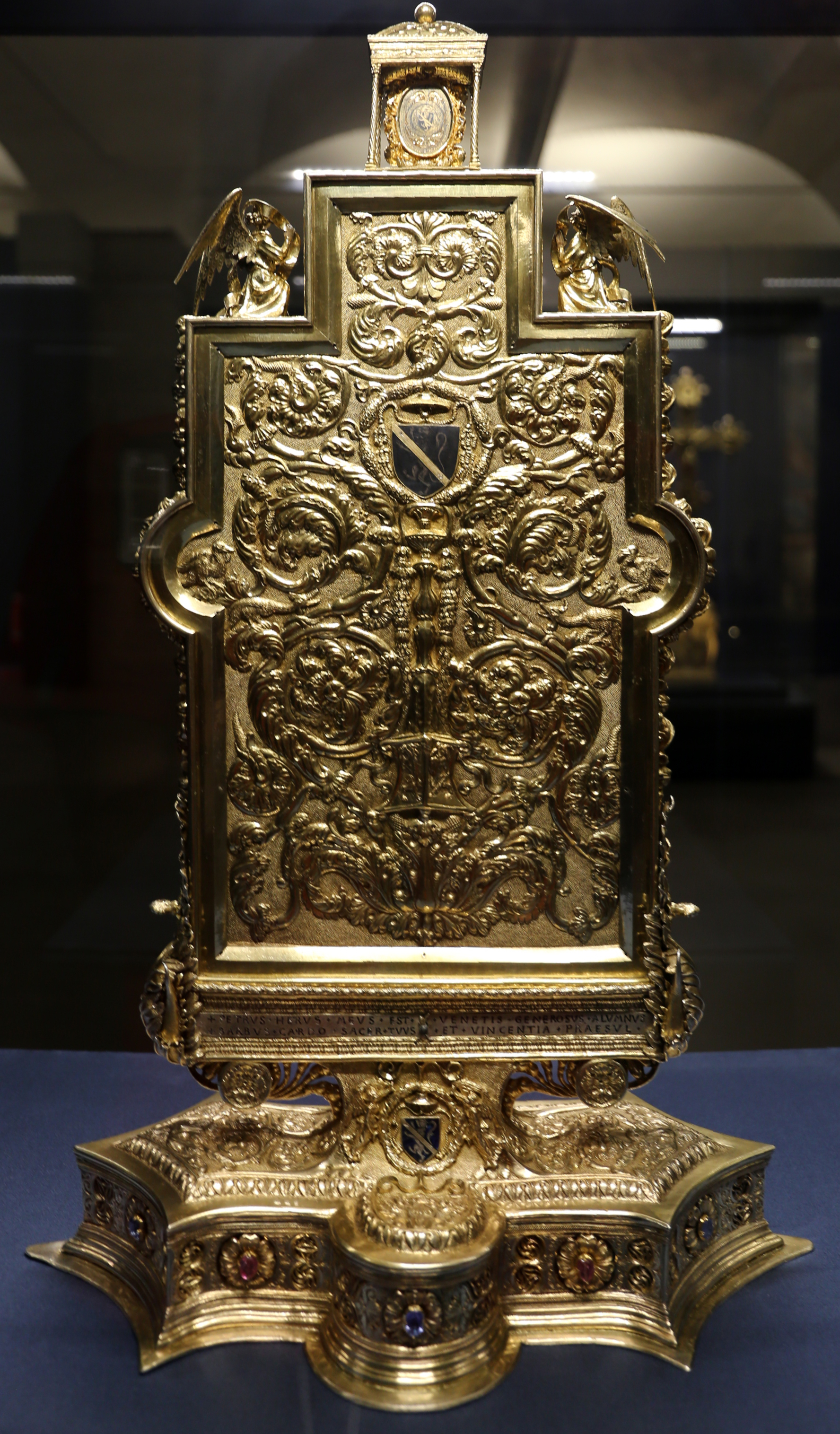
Rear face
