= Ronde-bosse =

Technique for covering three-dimensional objects in enamel

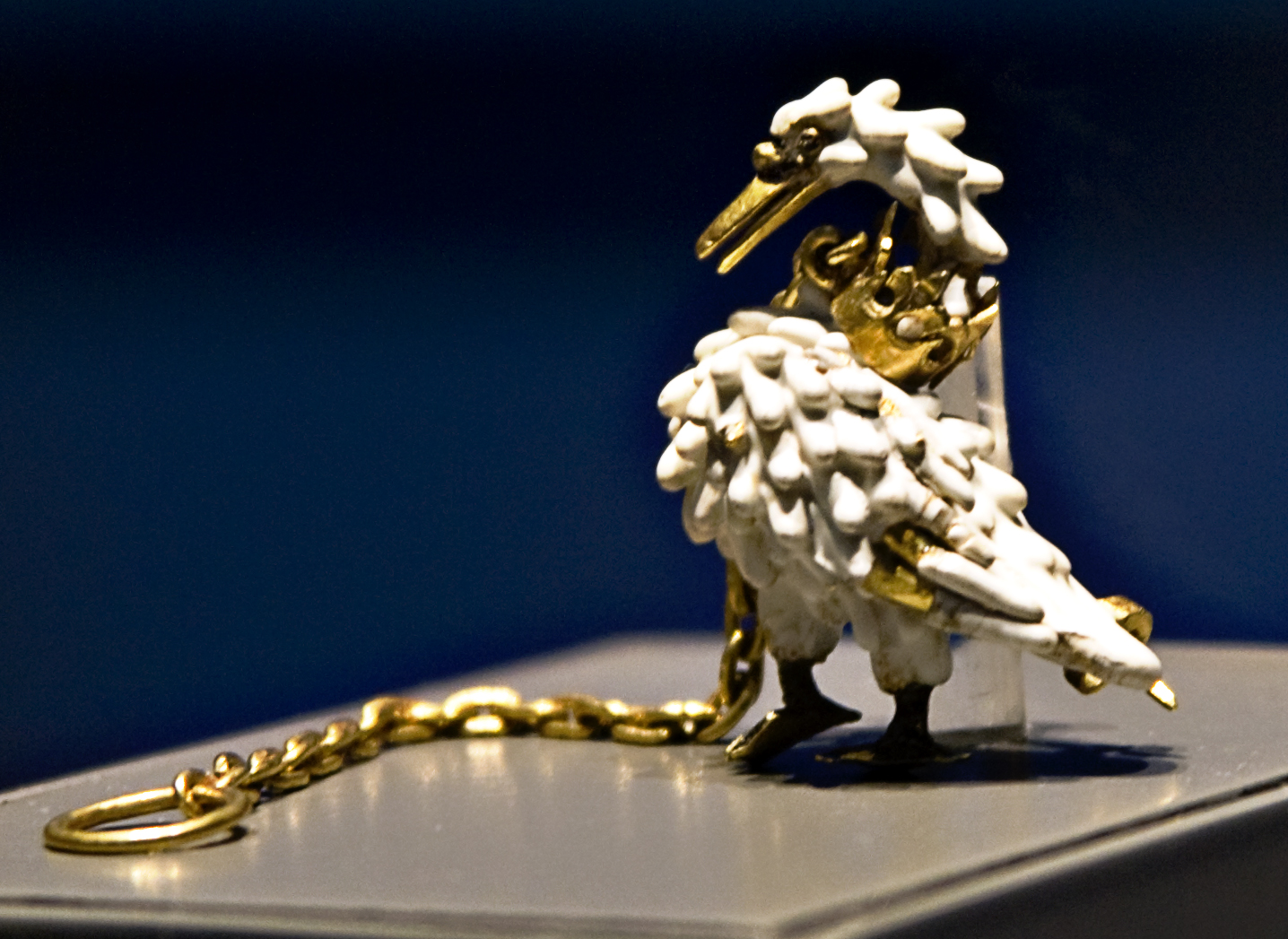
The Dunstable Swan Jewel, a livery badge, about 1400. British Museum

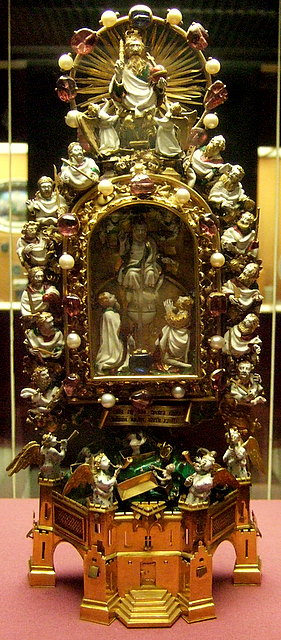
The Holy Thorn Reliquary in the British Museum; Paris, probably before 1397

Ronde-bosse, en ronde bosse or encrusted enamel is an enamelling technique developed in France in the late 14th century that produces small three-dimensional figures, or reliefs, largely or entirely covered in enamel. The new method involved the partial concealment of the underlying gold, or sometimes silver, from which the figure was formed. It differs from older techniques which all produced only enamel on a flat or curved surface, and mostly, like champlevé, normally used non-precious metals, such as copper, which were gilded to look like gold. In the technique of enamel en ronde-bosse small figures are created in gold or silver and their surfaces lightly roughened to provide a key for the enamel, which is applied as a paste and fired. In places the framework may only be wire.

The term derives from the French term émail en ronde bosse ("enamel in the round"); however in French en ronde bosse merely means "in the round" and is used of any sculpture; in English ronde bosse or en ronde bosse, though usually treated as foreign terms and italicised, are specifically used of the enamel technique, and in recent decades have largely replaced the older English term "encrusted enamel".

The technique rapidly reached maturity and produced a group of "exceptionally grand French and Burgundian court commissions, chiefly made c. 1400 but apparently continuing into the second quarter of the fifteenth century". These include the Goldenes Rössl ("Golden Pony") in Altötting, Bavaria, the most famous of the group, the Holy Thorn Reliquary in the British Museum, the Montalto Reliquary, the "Tableau of the Trinity" in the Louvre (possibly made in London), and a handful of other religious works, but the great majority of pieces recorded in princely inventories have been destroyed to recover their gold. After this period smaller works continued to be produced, and there was a revival of larger works c. 1500-1520, although it is not clear where these were made. The technique was used on parts of a relatively large sculpture in Benvenuto Cellini's famous Salt Cellar (1543, Vienna) and remained common through to the Baroque, usually in small works and jewellery. The Russian House of Fabergé made much use of the technique from the 19th century until the Russian Revolution.

The technique can be used with both translucent and opaque enamel, but more commonly the latter; translucent enamel is mostly found on reliefs using ronde bosse, such as a plaque with the Entombment of Christ in the Metropolitan Museum of Art, New York. In the works from around 1400, the recently developed white enamel usually predominates.
