= Taíno ritual seat =

Pre-Columbian wooden seat

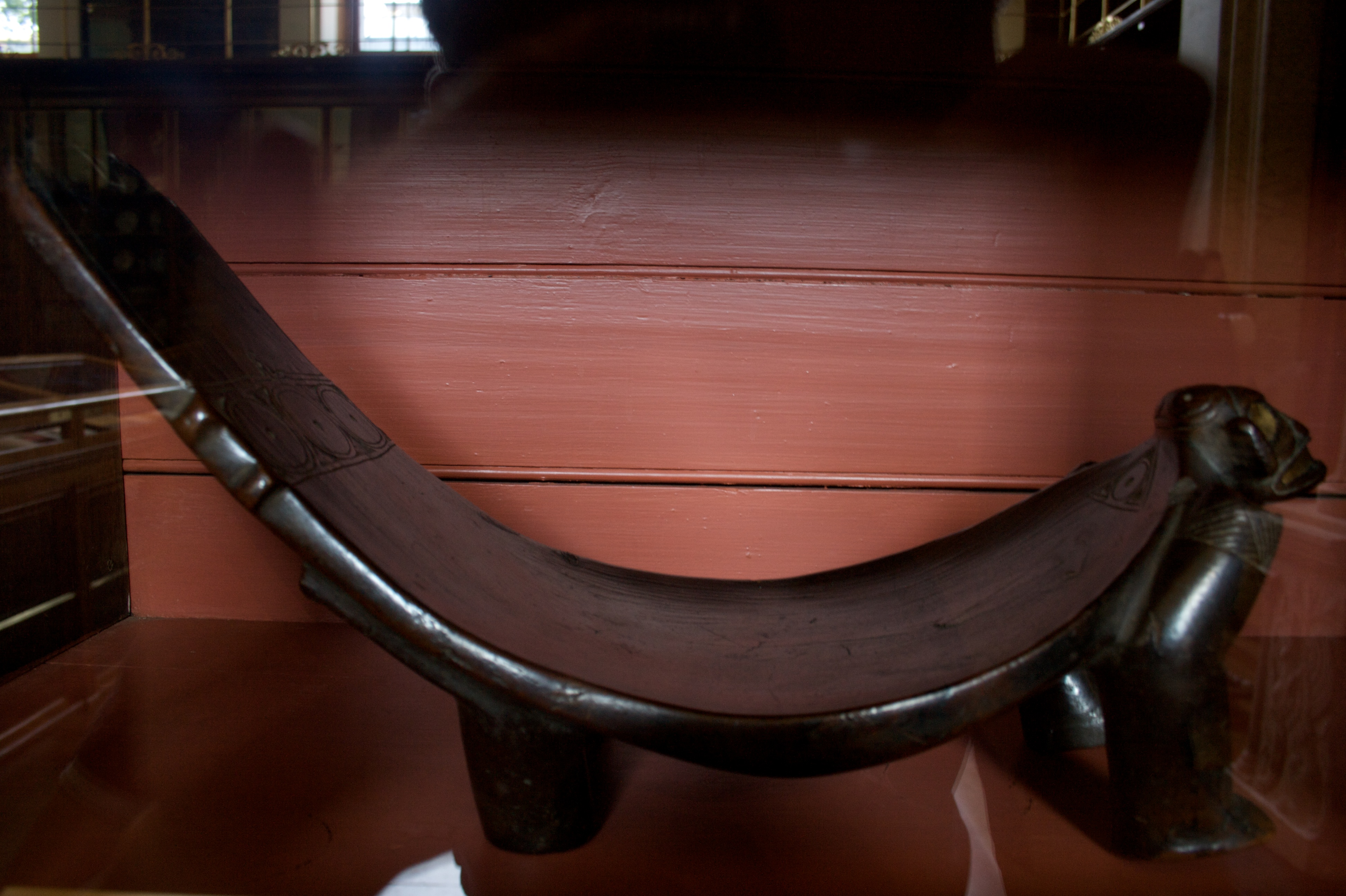
- Material: Wood, and gold
- Size: 44cm long, 22cm high, 13cm wide
- Created: AD 1200–1500
- Discovered: Santo Domingo, Caribbean
- Present location: British Museum, London

The Taíno ritual seat is a Pre-Columbian wooden seat made in the form of a man on all fours. It was made by the Taíno people and found in a cave near the city of Santo Domingo in the Dominican Republic. The seat was made before Christopher Columbus landed in the Caribbean and is an important remnant of the Taíno culture and civilisation that existed before the arrival of Europeans.

== Description ==
The seat is made from the dense hardwood called Lignum vitae. In this case the Lignum vitae is from the Guaiacum officinale tree. This tree's flowers are the national flower of Jamaica. The small chair is made in the form of a man on all fours. The head is decorated with gold and the figure is carved with male genitals underneath.

== Importance ==
Duhos are carved seats found in the houses of Taíno caciques or chiefs throughout the Caribbean region. Duhos “figured prominently in the maintenance of Taino political and ideological systems . . . [and were] . . . literally seats of power, prestige, and ritual.” Duhos made of wood and stone have both been found, though those made of wood tend not to last as well as the stone chairs and are, therefore, much rarer. This seat is one of two Taíno seats called Duho in the British Museum that were originally found on the island of Hispaniola. The other is also modelled anthropomorphically on a man, but in that case the resemblance to a man on his stomach is more proportional. There is another wooden duho in the collections of the British Museum that was found on the island of Eleuthera in the Bahamas.

== Purpose ==
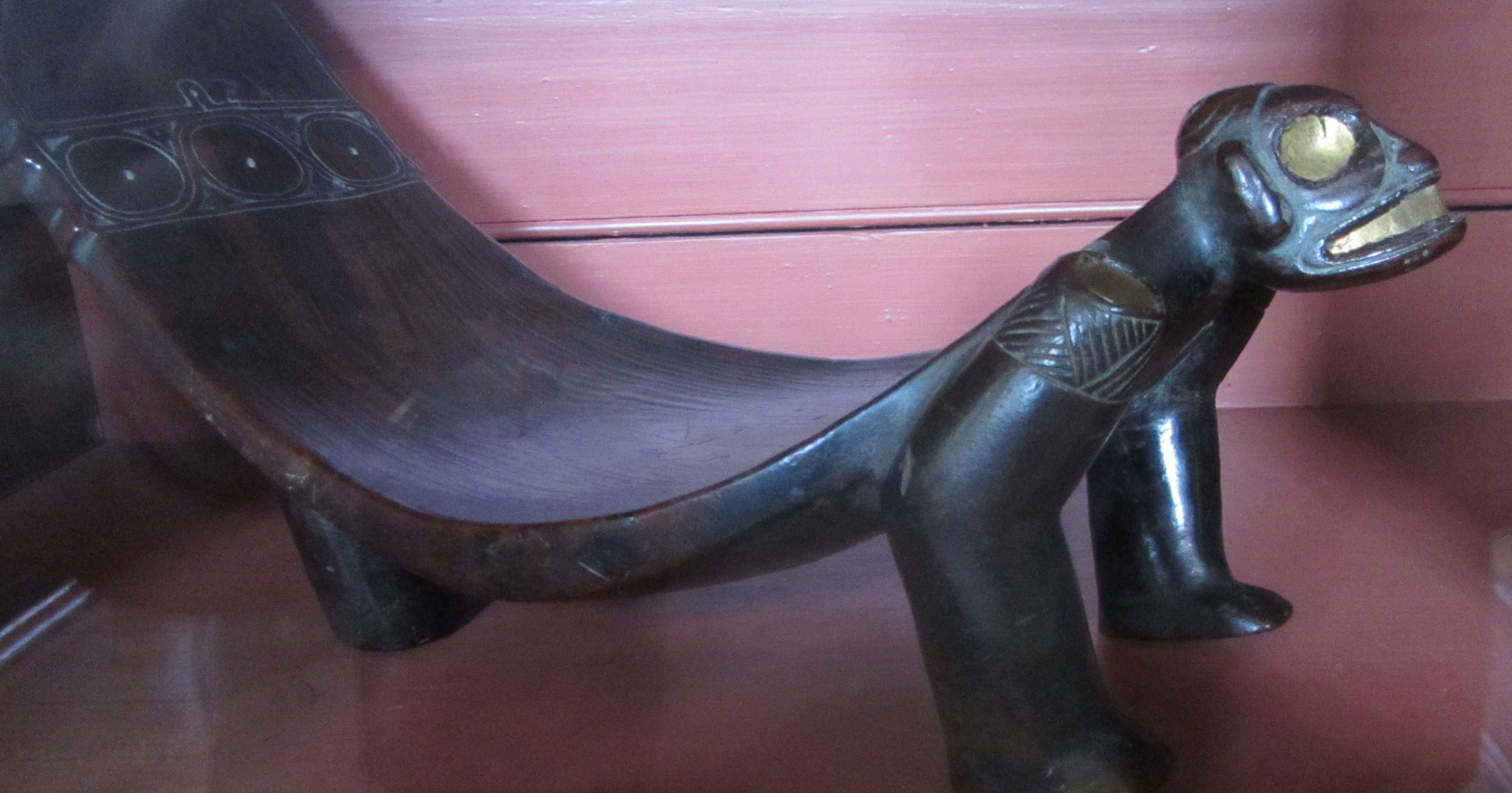
Closer view of the seat's carved figure.

Some of the first people that Christopher Columbus met in the American continent were the Taíno people. Their 7,000-year-old civilisation did not benefit from pre-colonial contact as many were later enslaved or died of disease. It was noted by early explorers that some of their time the Taíno people were using hallucinogenic drugs. The drug and the pipes that were used are called cohoba. It is likely that one of these chiefs used this seat to smoke these drugs. The British Museum's seat has a bowl above the figures head, which may have been used to hold cohoba during rituals involving the Zemi gods.

== History of the World ==
This chair from the British Museum was chosen to be one of the History of the World in 100 Objects which was a series of radio programmes that started in 2010 and that were created in a partnership between the BBC and the British Museum.

== See also ==
- Zemi Figures from Vere, Jamaica

Preceded by 64: David Vases	A History of the World in 100 Objects; Object 65	Succeeded by 66: Holy Thorn Reliquary
