= Zemi figures from Vere, Jamaica =

Important collection of pre-Columbian wooden figures

Zemi figures from Vere
- Material: Wood
- Size: 104 cm high in total (male figure)
- Created: 15th-16th century
- Present location: British Museum, London
- Registration: Am1977, Q.1-3

The Zemi figures from Vere, Jamaica (this area is situated in the modern parish of Clarendon) are an important collection of pre-Columbian wooden figures found in the Carpenters Mountains in Jamaica in the late 18th century. They were originally made by the Taíno people and may have served as venerated objects that housed local spirits or deities. They now form part of the British Museum's collection.

== Discovery ==
The three figures were found by a surveyor in a cave near the settlement of Vere in the Carpenters Mountains in June 1792. They were exhibited for the first time at the Society of Antiquaries of London in 1799 by Isaac Alves Rebello, whose father had owned them until his death in 1796. It is presumed that his son Isaac gave them to the British Museum soon after, though the gift was not recorded in their records (not untypically for the period).

== Description ==
All three figures are carved from a tropical hardwood called guayacan (Guaiacum officinale L.). The surface of the sculptures were probably polished with pebbles to bring the resin to the surface and attain the black lustre. The largest figure (the head of which is illustrated here) represents a male spiritual being, with prominent genitalia and powerful limbs, demonstrating masculine strength and virility. The second figure, at 87 cm high slightly smaller than the male zemi, mixes human and animal characteristics. The head can be described as birdlike with a protruding beak and teeth made of inlaid shells, but the body is more human-like with male sexual organs. The third sculpture has an unusually wide face carved below a canopy, which was probably used for the ritual inhalation of a hallucinogenic substance called cahoba.

== Original purpose ==
As the Taíno's written record is in the form of petroglyphs (a type of Proto-writing) on which very little research has been done, the purpose and role of these figures are based on records kept by the Spanish during the early colonial period. It appears that the Taíno actively sought contact with spiritual beings who were capable of performing many deeds on their behalf. The taking of hallucinogenic drugs seems to have been an important part of communicating with these deities. The ingredients of the substance called cahoba are thought to have been based on powdered tobacco but other additions including brine and lime have been proposed and hallucogins prepared from Anadenanthera peregrina.

== See also ==
- Taíno ritual seat
