= Holy Thorn Reliquary =

14th-century reliquary made for John, Duke of Berry

The Holy Thorn Reliquary
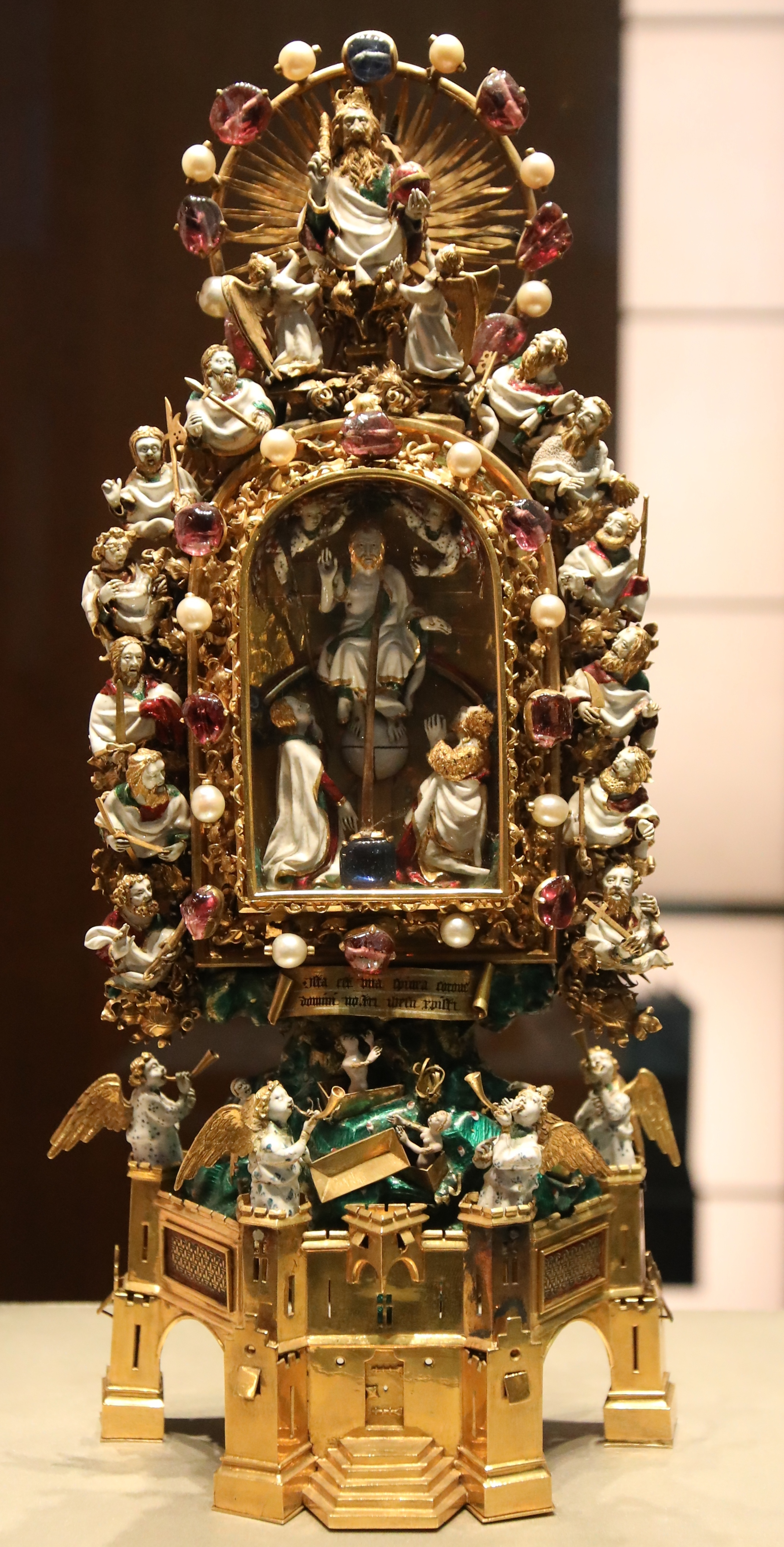
- Front view
- Material: Gold, sapphire, ruby, rock crystal, pearl, enamel
- Created: Probably before 1397
- Present location: Room 2A, British Museum, London
- Identification: WB.67

The Holy Thorn Reliquary was probably created in the 1390s in Paris for John, Duke of Berry, to house a relic of the Crown of Thorns. The reliquary was bequeathed to the British Museum in 1898 by Ferdinand de Rothschild as part of the Waddesdon Bequest. It is one of a small number of major goldsmiths' works or joyaux that survive from the extravagant world of the courts of the Valois royal family around 1400. It is made of gold, lavishly decorated with jewels and pearls, and uses the technique of enamelling en ronde bosse, or "in the round", which had been recently developed when the reliquary was made, to create a total of 28 three-dimensional figures, mostly in white enamel.

Except at its base the reliquary is slim, with two faces; the front view shows the end of the world and the Last Judgement, with the Trinity and saints above and the resurrection of the dead below, and the relic of a single long thorn believed to come from the crown of thorns worn by Jesus when he was crucified. The rear view has less extravagant decoration, mostly in plain gold in low relief, and has doors that opened to display a flat object, now missing, which was presumably another relic.

The reliquary was in the Habsburg collections from at least the 16th century until the 1860s, when it was replaced by a forgery during a restoration by an art dealer, Salomon Weininger. The fraud remained undetected until well after the original reliquary came to the British Museum. The reliquary was featured in the BBC's A History of the World in 100 Objects, in which Neil MacGregor described it as "without question one of the supreme achievements of medieval European metalwork", and was a highlight of the exhibition Treasures of Heaven: Saints, Relics, and Devotion in Medieval Europe at the British Museum from June 23 to October 2011.

== History ==
King Louis IX of France bought what he believed to be the authentic Crown of Thorns in Constantinople in 1239, and individual thorns were distributed as gifts by subsequent French kings. John, Duke of Berry (1340–1416), brother of King Charles V of France, had this reliquary made to house a single thorn; it was probably made a few years before he commissioned his famous Très Riches Heures du Duc de Berry, and some years after he commissioned the Royal Gold Cup, also in the British Museum. Previously dated between 1401 and 1410, from evidence in John Cherry's book of 2010 the reliquary is now thought to have been made before 1397; based on the heraldic forms used, the museum now dates it to 1390–97. The Holy Thorn Reliquary was later thought to have been in the possession of Louis I, Duke of Orléans, but all recent writers prefer his uncle, the Duke of Berry.

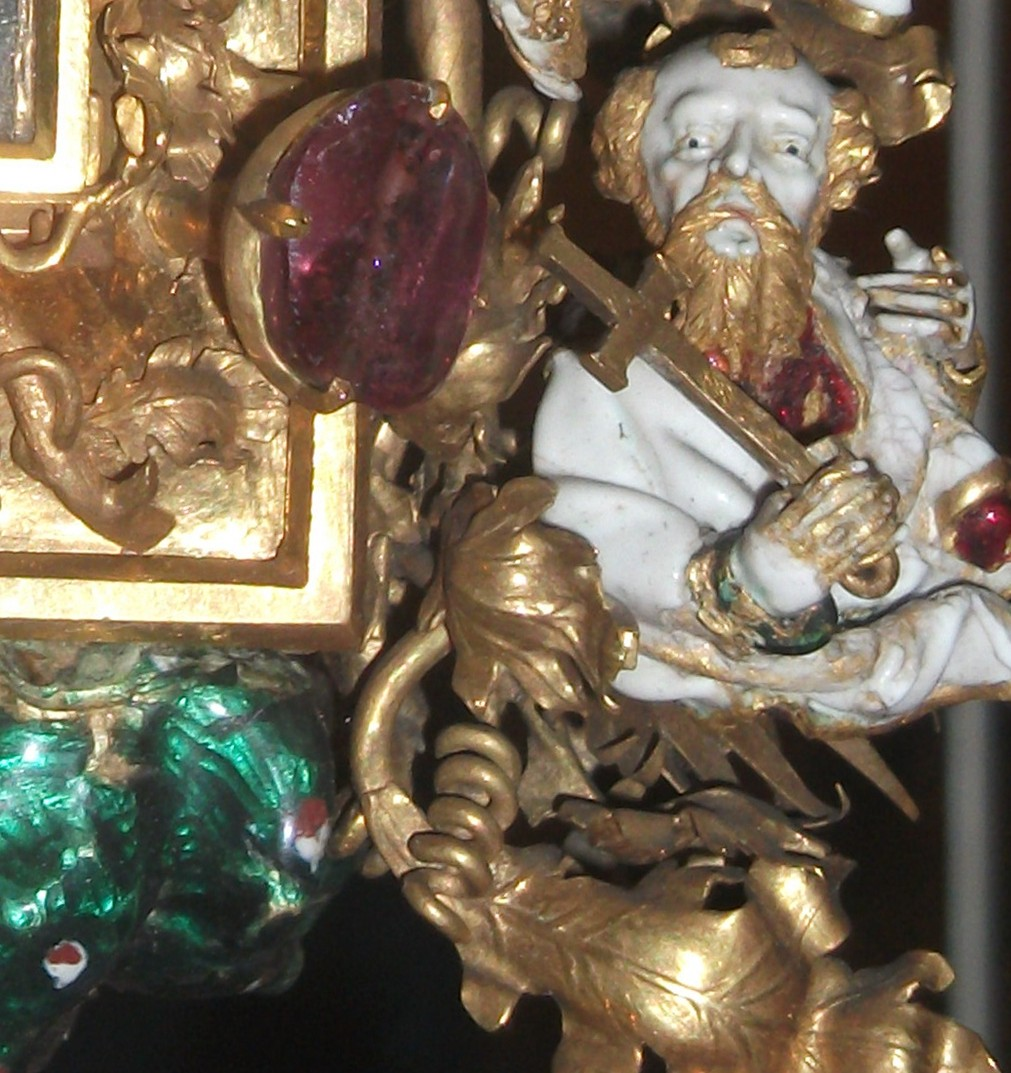
Detail of one of the Apostles (over actual size)

Its location is unknown until an inventory of 1544, when it belonged to Holy Roman Emperor Charles V, perhaps as an inheritance from his ancestors the Valois Dukes of Burgundy. It presumably passed to the Austrian branch of the Habsburgs on Charles V's death, as it is listed in several inventories of the Imperial Schatzkammer ("treasure chamber") in Vienna from 1677 onwards. It remained in Vienna until after 1860, when it appeared in an exhibition. Some time after this it was sent to be restored by Salomon Weininger, an art dealer with access to skilled craftsmen, who secretly made a number of copies. He was later convicted of other forgeries, and died in prison in 1879, but it was still not realised that he had returned one of his copies of the reliquary to the Imperial collections instead of the original. The Viennese Rothschild family bought the original reliquary by 1872, in ignorance of its provenance; it was inherited by Ferdinand de Rothschild, who moved to England, and built Waddesdon Manor in Buckinghamshire. One of the copies remained in the Ecclesiastical Treasury of the Imperial Habsburg Court in Vienna, where the deception remained undetected for several decades.

The original reliquary reached the British Museum as part of the Waddesdon Bequest in 1899, by which time its origins had been "completely lost" and it was described as "Spanish, 16th Century". Thus its history had to be reconstructed through scholarship; the meaning of the heraldic plaques on the castle base had by now been lost in both London and Vienna. The first publication to assert that the London reliquary was the one recorded in earlier Viennese inventories was an article by Joseph Destrée in 1927; the matter was not finally settled until 1959 when the Viennese version was brought to London to enable close comparison. The assembled experts from the British Museum, Victoria and Albert Museum and Kunsthistorisches Museum in Vienna agreed that the London reliquary was the original. Under the terms of the Waddesdon Bequest the reliquary cannot leave the museum; in 2011 it was omitted from the Cleveland and Baltimore legs of the exhibition Treasures of Heaven: Saints, Relics, and Devotion in Medieval Europe. Normally it is on display in Room 45, the dedicated Waddesdon Bequest Room, as specified in the terms of the bequest.

== Description ==
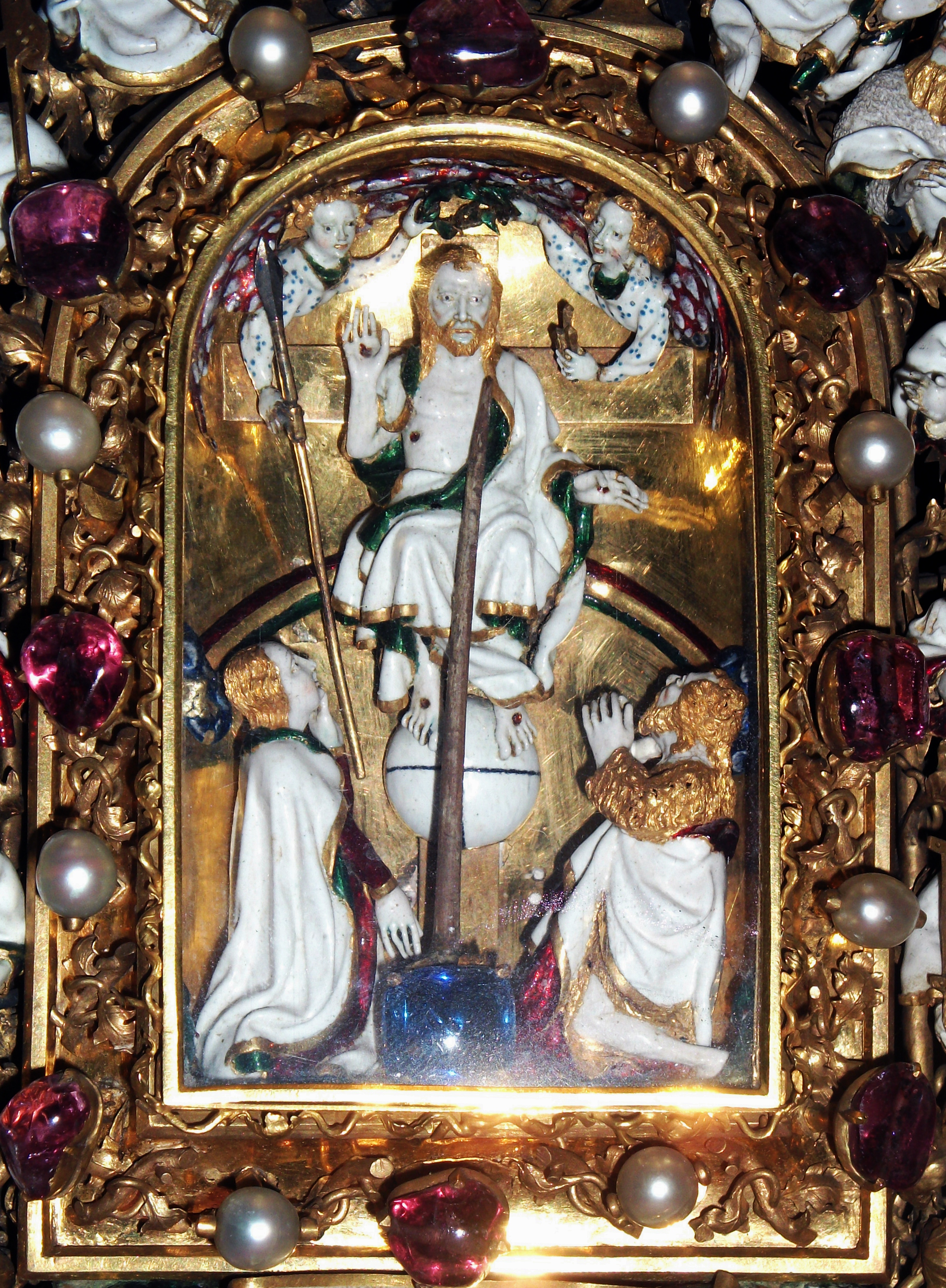
The thorn rises before Christ

The Holy Thorn Reliquary is made of gold, enamel, rock crystal, pearls, rubies and sapphires. It is just over 30 centimetres (12 in) high and weighs 1.4 kilograms (3.1 lb). There are some areas of damage (including what appears to be deliberate removal of enamel in the 19th century), and small losses and repairs; but generally the reliquary is in good condition. The central front compartment holding the relic is protected by a thin pane of rock crystal, which has kept it in perfect condition. The enamel is mostly in ronde bosse technique, applied to three-dimensional figures, with white as the dominant colour. At the time, white enamel using lead had been only recently developed and was very fashionable, dominating many contemporary ronde bosse works. There is also red, green, blue, pink, and black enamel. Pure gold is used throughout, which is rare even in royal commissions of such pieces at this period; most use cheaper silver-gilt for the structural framework.

The jewels, which would have been keenly appreciated by contemporary viewers, include two large sapphires, one above God the Father at the very top of the reliquary, where it may have represented heaven, and the other below Christ, on which the thorn is mounted. The gold elements framing God the Father and the central compartment with Christ and the thorn are decorated with alternating rubies and pearls, totalling fourteen of each. All the gemstones have the smooth and polished cabochon cut normal in medieval jewellery, and though they are set in the reliquary with gold "claws", all are drilled through as though for threading on a necklace, suggesting that they are re-used from another piece. There may have been other jewels now lost, for example mounted in two holes on either side of the door of the castle-like base.

=== Front face ===
The design of the front face is based on the general resurrection of the dead following the Last Judgment. At the top sits God the Father, above two angels. A small hole at the level of their knees shows where a dove representing the Holy Spirit was originally attached; with Christ below, all three persons of the Trinity were therefore represented. A round-topped compartment protected by a rock-crystal "window" holds the relic itself and the group around Christ. Christ in Judgment is shown seated displaying the wounds of his crucifixion, with his feet resting on the globe of the world, and making a blessing gesture. As with all the enamelled figures that are still extant, the hair is in gold, the main robe is in white, and the flesh is in white with coloured eyes and lips, a touch of pink on the cheeks. Behind Christ the celestial spheres are represented like a rainbow, and above him fly two angels holding Instruments of the Passion, including the crown of thorns over his head; behind him a cross in shallow relief emerges from the curved gold background. The thorn relic rises below and in front of him, mounted on a "monstrously large sapphire".

To the left and right of Christ are shown John the Baptist and the Virgin Mary in supplicant poses, a traditional grouping; John was also one of the Duke's patron saints. Around the central scene small figures of the twelve Apostles carrying their identifying attributes emerge from the foliage border of oak leaves and tendrils; the uppermost heads on each side are replacements, probably by Weininger in the 1860s.

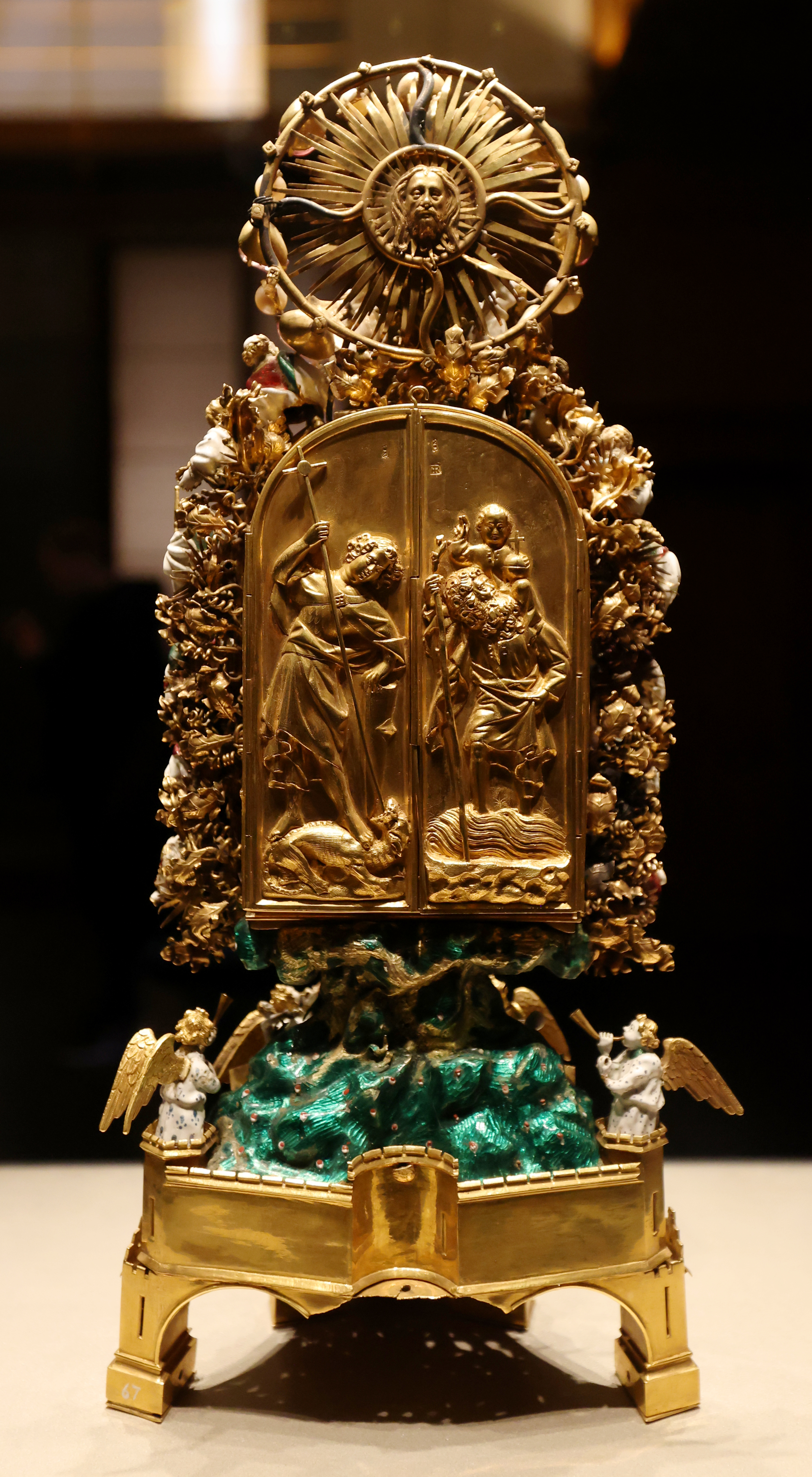
Rear view

Below this upper section there is a gold scroll label with the Latin inscription Ista est una spinea corone / Domini nostri ihesu xpisti ("This is a thorn from the crown / Of Our Lord Jesus Christ") in black enamel filling the engraved letters. Below the inscription is a scene showing the mass resurrection of naked people rising from their graves on the Day of Judgement. On a green enamel mound like a hillside are four naked figures, two men and two women, emerging from tiny gold coffins whose lids have been upturned on the ground; the women wear white caps. Four angels blowing horns sound the "Last Trump" of the Book of Revelation, standing on the turrets of a tiny castle which serves as the base of the reliquary.

The Last Judgement was an especially appropriate subject for setting a relic from the Crown of Thorns. Some thought that the crown was held by the French kings on loan, and would be reclaimed by Christ on the Day of Judgement—a belief expressed in the antiphon sung at Sens Cathedral in 1239 to celebrate the arrival of the main relic.

Two panels on the walls of the castle are patterned with the coat of arms of the Duke of Berry, and their form has been crucial for establishing the provenance and date of the work. Two of the angels with horns have blue fleurs-de-lis on their robes; the other two, patterns of dots in blue. All the arches of the castle are semicircular, and in fact the whole reliquary lacks any Gothic pointed arches, even among the tracery—a sign of advanced artistic taste at the time. In this respect the Holy Thorn Reliquary contrasts strongly with the Tableau of the Trinity in the Louvre (possibly made in London), whose framework is a forest of crocketed Gothic pinnacles, although estimates of its date cover the same period as the reliquary.

=== Rear face ===
The rear face is plainer, with no jewels, but still highly decorated; Cherry speculates that it may originally have been much more simple and not designed for viewing, with most of the other elements added after it was originally made. At the top is a medallion with the face of Christ set in a sunburst. The central round-topped area contains two doors, secured with a small gold pin, containing full-length gold figures in relief, chased in gold, a feature unique to this reliquary. On the left door is the archangel Saint Michael, spearing a dragon representing the devil. He was both the patron saint of the French monarchy, and also traditionally the person responsible for supervising the chaotic crowds at the Last Judgement, when he is often shown in art weighing souls in a pair of scales. On the right is Saint Christopher, carrying the Christ child on his shoulders, who raises his hand in blessing. There was a popular belief that sight of an image of Saint Christopher meant that a person would not die on that day without receiving the Last Rites, which may well explain his presence here.

In the fake in Vienna, the figures of both saints are enamelled; flesh is white, Michael and the Christ child have red robes, and Christopher blue, and the saints stand on a brownish dragon and blue water respectively, with green grass below both of these. Some scholars have thought it unlikely that the forger invented this scheme, and therefore presumed that he copied enamel on the original that has been removed in the 19th century, probably because it was damaged—sections of enamel cannot be patched up, but must be removed completely and redone. However John Cherry believes this and other changes in the enamel of the Vienna version are elaborations by Weininger and his craftsmen; for example in Vienna the wings of the trumpeting angels are coloured. The two figures are in a sophisticated "soft and flowing" International Gothic style executed with great virtuosity; Michael's staff is detached from the background over most of its length and is one of a number of elements that extend outside the frame of the door. If there was once enamel on the two figures it would have been at least mainly in more fragile translucent enamels, as the very fine working of many details of them was clearly intended to be seen. The rougher working of the surfaces at the bottom of the doors: the dragon below St Michael, the water below St Christopher, and the ground below both of these, suggests that the missing original enamels were opaque in these areas. But all the extra enamel in Vienna is opaque, including the saints' figures, and the effect of the more intense colours is "lurid" and "offends our eyes because of its crudity".

When the pin is removed and the small doors opened, there is now nothing to see but "a flat layer of plaster, with a sheet of nineteenth-century paper or vellum in front of it". Whatever was designed to be displayed has now gone; it must have been flat, and was perhaps another relic, probably a textile, or a picture on vellum. The Veil of Veronica, in either form, is a possibility; the face of Christ at the top in a circular setting often represents this. Outside the doors the foliate border of the front is continued, uninterrupted by figures. Below two of the angels with trumpets can be seen, with an unpopulated stretch of the green hillside, and below it the back of the castle base, which has apparently had another arched "leg" in the centre crudely removed, leaving a jagged edge, and also making the reliquary rather less stable.

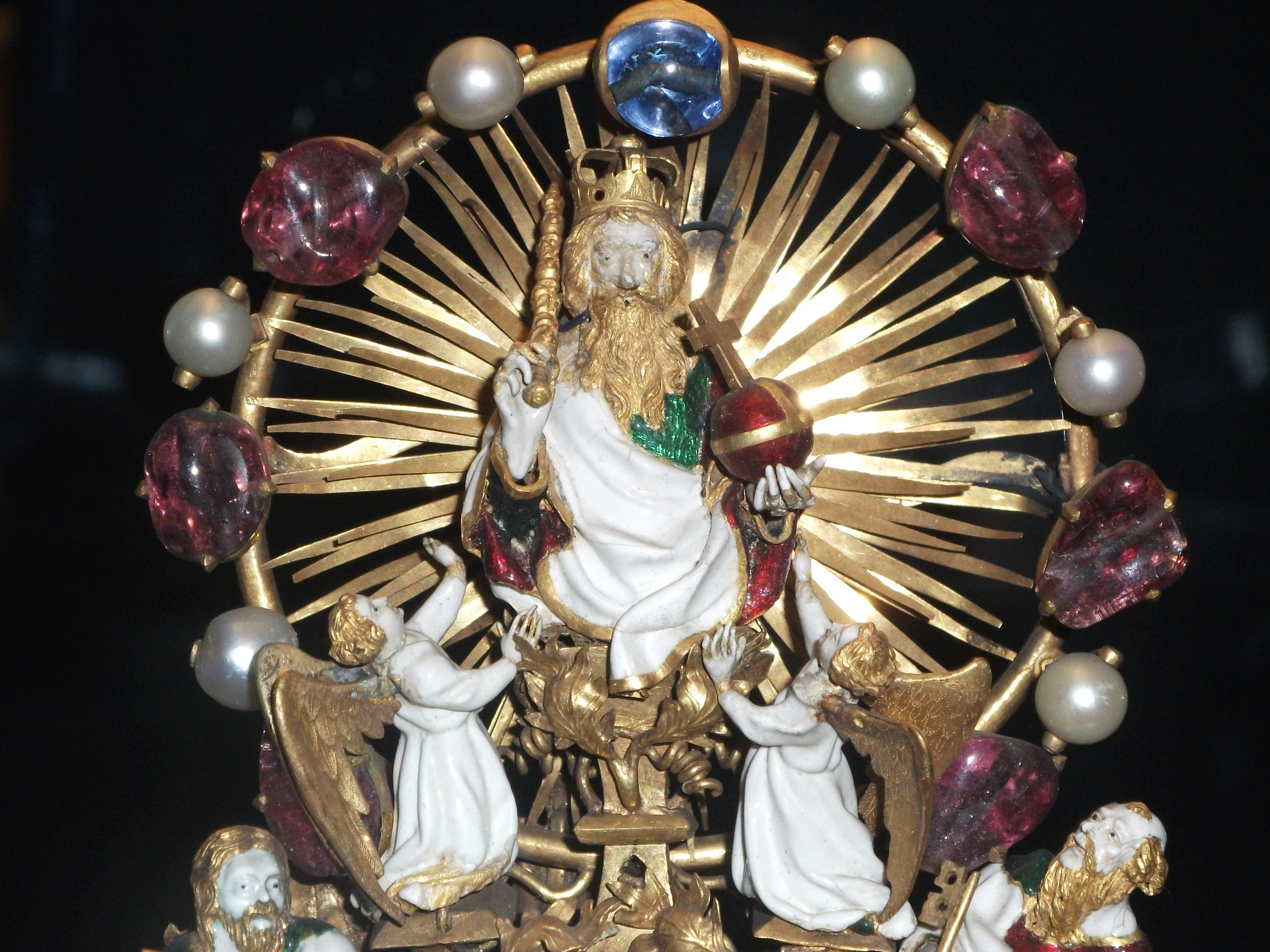
God the Father

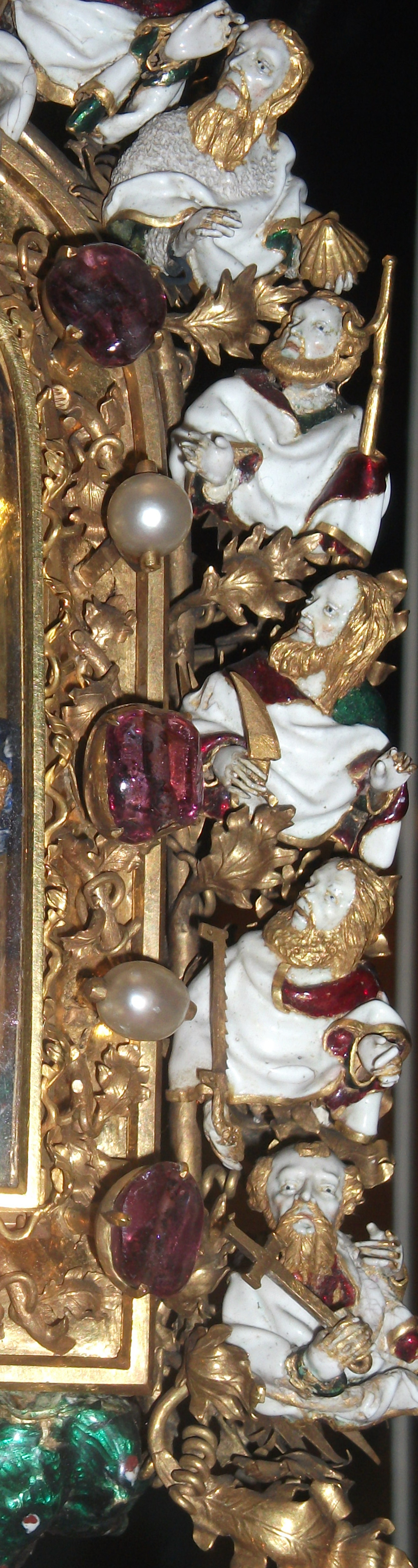
Detail of Apostles

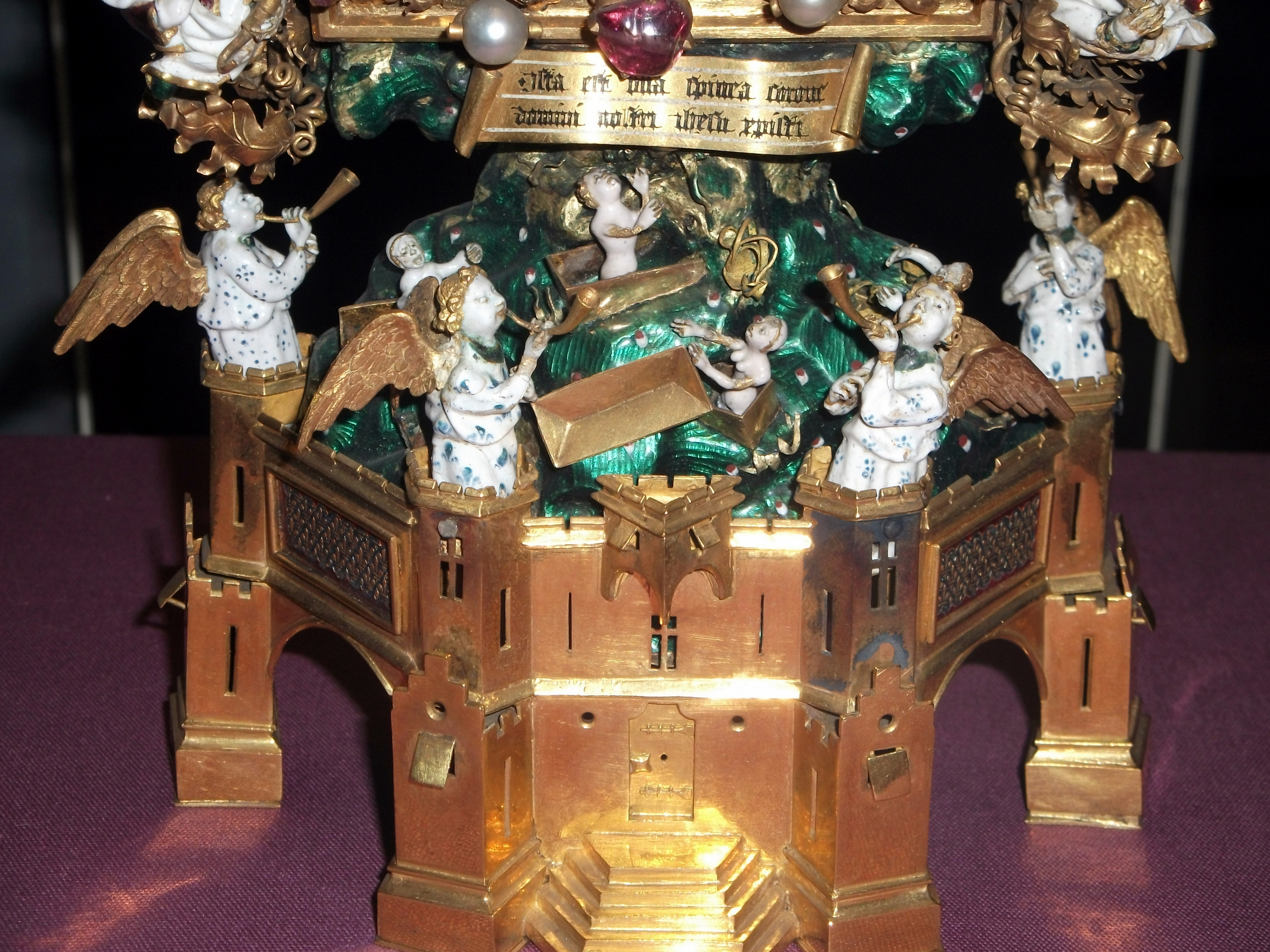
Detail of the base

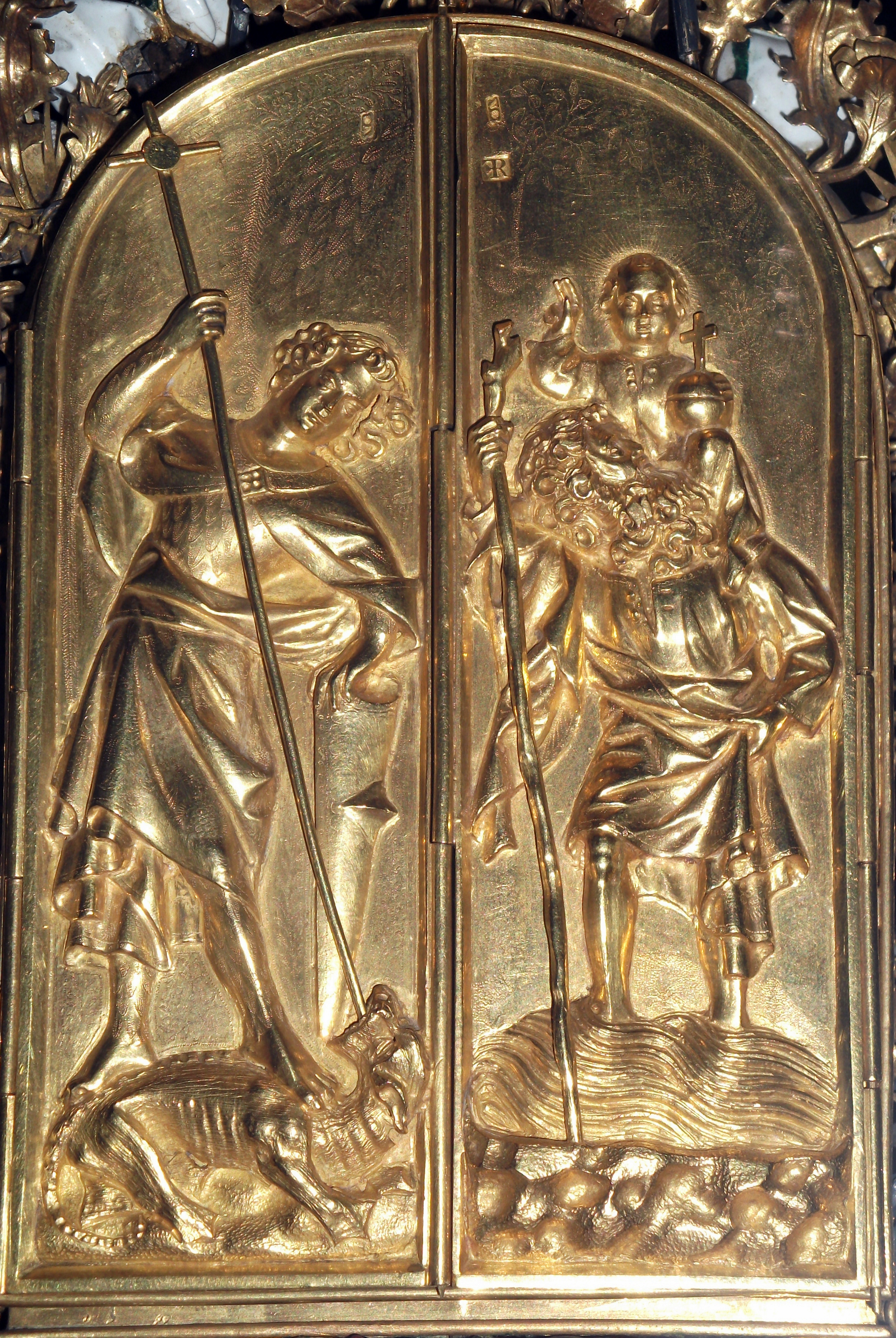
The doors on the reverse

== Goldsmith ==
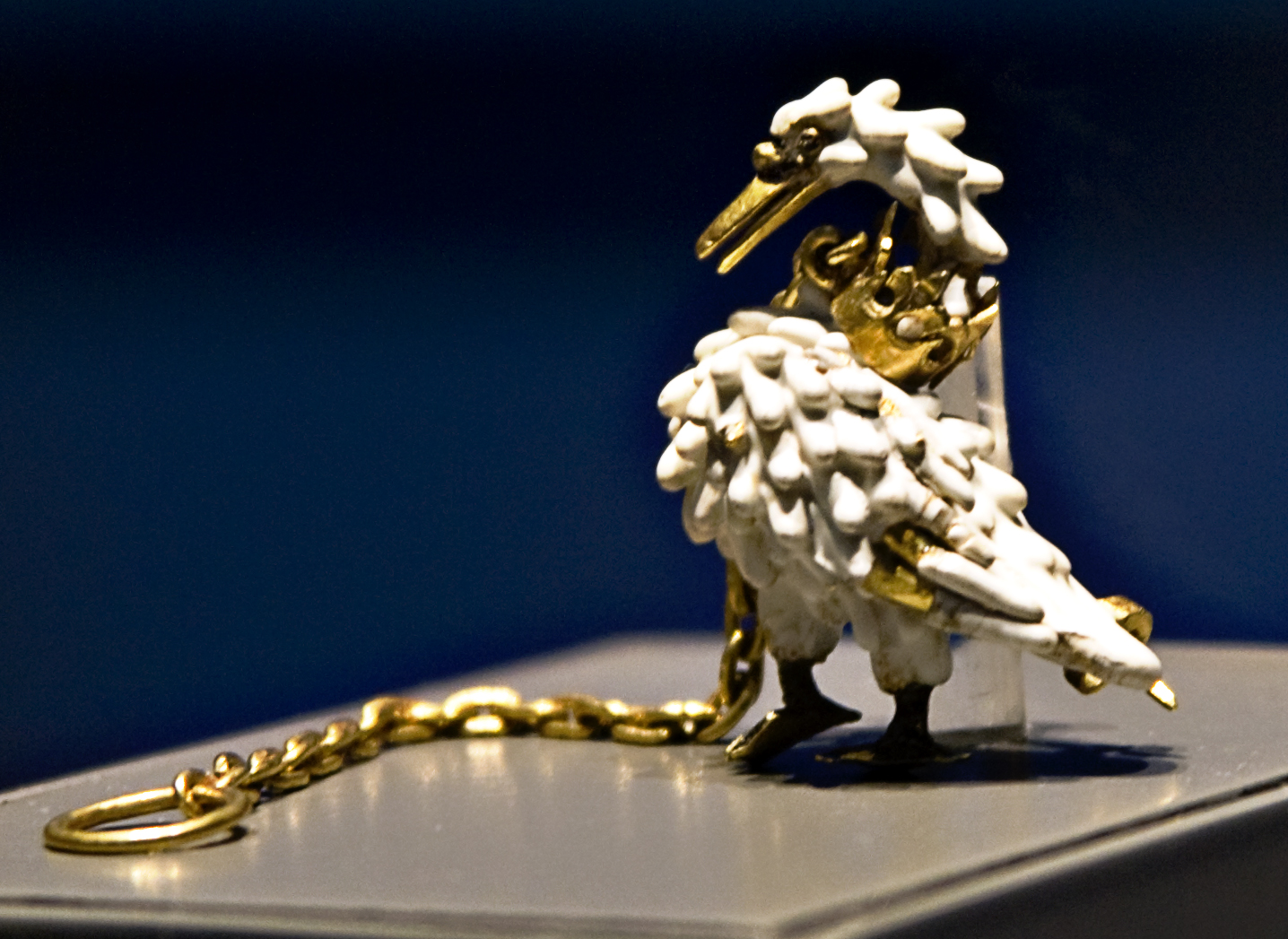
The Dunstable Swan Jewel, a livery badge in ronde bosse or "encrusted" enamelling, about 1400. British Museum

The maker of the work is unknown; it is not signed or marked, and goldsmiths of the period rarely did this. There are a number of goldsmiths' names known from accounts and other records, but none of the few surviving works can be attached to a particular maker. Paris was the centre of production for the great numbers of joyaux, secular and religious, produced for the extended Valois royal family and other buyers. Berry and his brothers and nephews had goldsmiths on salaries or retainers for what must have been a continuous flow of commissions, whose results are tersely catalogued in various inventories of the period, but of which there are now only a handful of survivals. Only one item mentioned in the records of the Berry collection might match the reliquary, but this was made after 1401, which conflicts with the date suggested by the heraldry. Another possibility is that the reliquary was made and given as a gift, as many such pieces were, in between inventories.

=== Techniques ===
The reliquary exuberantly exploits the ronde bosse or "encrusted" enamelling technique, which involves creating small three-dimensional figures coated in enamel on a metal core, often just gold wire. The technique was a recent innovation which the goldsmiths working for the Valois were pushing to its limits at the end of the 14th century. The main colour of enamel used is a lead-based white, which had also only been developed a decade or two at most before the date of the reliquary, and was evidently very fashionable at the end of the century. White dominates the few surviving large enamels in ronde bosse dated to the period beginning about 1380 and ending about 1410, used as here for both the clothes and flesh of the figures. Gold is used for their hair, and other enamel colours are mostly used at the neck and cuffs to demarcate between white robes and white flesh; "throughout, colour is used in a very considered way"; "a controlled use of red includes the alternation of rubies and pearls", except where "a single sapphire interrupts this rhythm" above God the Father. Blue, an important enamel colour in other works, is almost entirely absent here, perhaps so as not to overshadow the large sapphires.

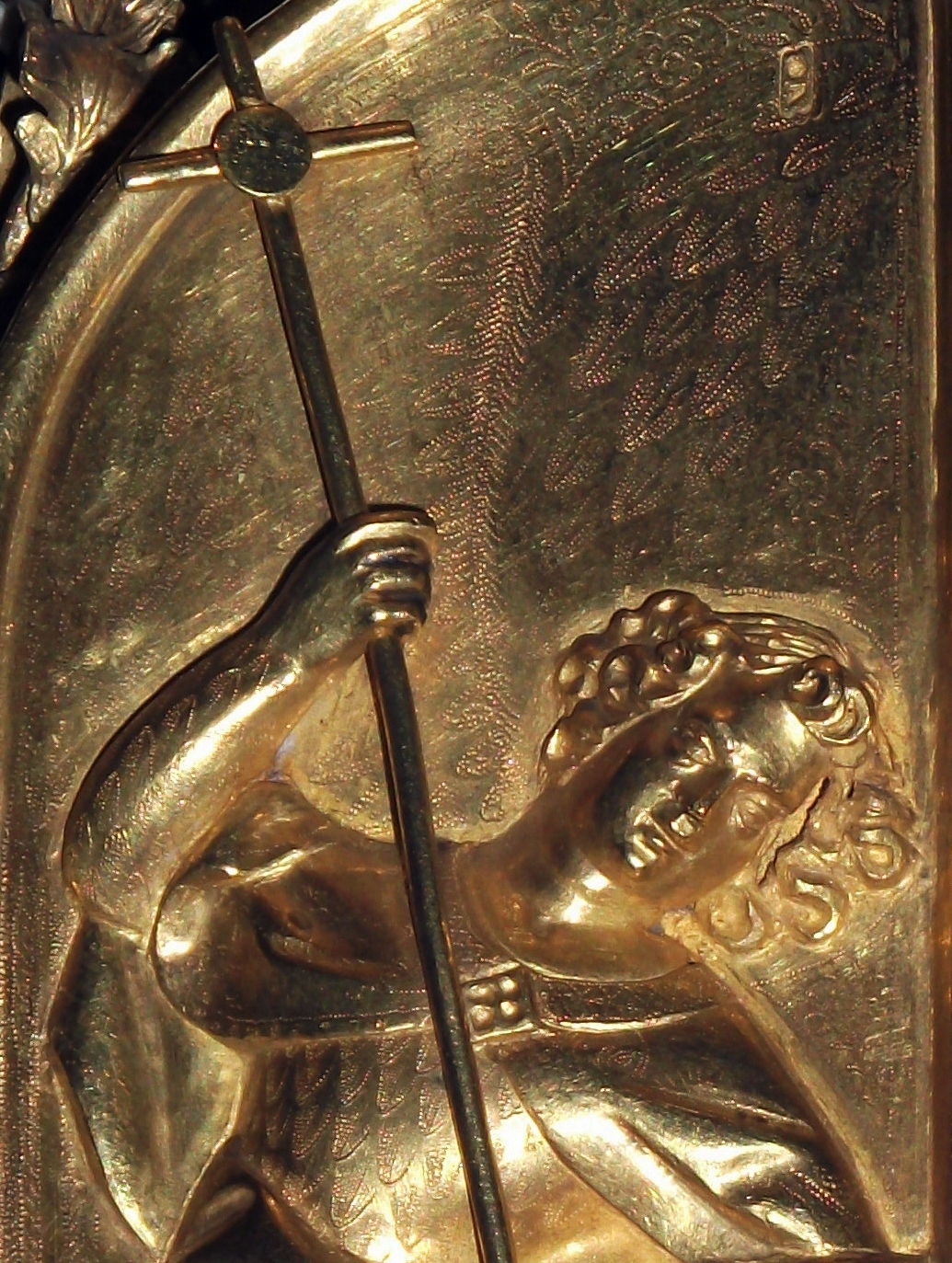
Detail of Saint Michael; a rectangular Viennese tax stamp near top

Other techniques are also used with a great degree of skill; the large figures on the rear are chased, with St Michael's wings being represented on the flat surface of the door in delicate stippled or pointillé work using punches, which is too detailed to see in most photographs, and indeed hard to see on the original. Michael's body is also feathered, stopping at the neck, ankles and wrists, a "most exceptional feature" often referred to as "feather tights", that perhaps borrows from the costumes of liturgical dramas. Other elements were cast in small moulds, and most of the visible gold has been burnished to give a smooth and shining appearance.

== Patron ==
Jean, duc de Berry (1340–1416), or the "excellent puissant Prince Jehan filz de roy de France Duc de Berry" ("excellent and powerful prince Jean, son of the king of France, Duke of Berry"), as his secretary inscribed one of his manuscripts, was the third of the four sons of King John II of France—Charles V, Louis I, Duke of Anjou (1339–1384), Berry and Philip the Bold, Duke of Burgundy (1342–1404). All commissioned great numbers of works of art in various media, and in particular spent huge sums on works in gold and silver. Although it is Berry who is especially remembered as a patron, partly because he specialized in illuminated manuscripts which have little value in their materials and so have not been recycled, his brother Louis of Anjou had over 3,000 pieces of plate at one point. These included wholly secular pieces with sculptures in enamel that can only be imagined by comparison as regards technique to the handful of reliquaries, like the Holy Thorn Reliquary, that have survived from the period, and as regards subject matter to tapestries and some secular illuminated manuscripts. There are extremely detailed inventories of Berry's possessions including ones from 1401 to 1403 and 1413–1416, however none contain an entry whose description matches the reliquary.

Soon after Berry's death in 1416, the bulk of his treasures were seized and melted down by the English, who were occupying much of northern France after their victory at the Battle of Agincourt the previous year. That the reliquary escaped this fate suggests it may have been given away by Berry, perhaps to his Burgundian cousins, in whose family it is next recorded (the Burgundian heiress Mary of Burgundy married the Habsburg Maximilian I, Holy Roman Emperor in 1477). A reliquary that was donated to the church had a better chance of surviving than the similar secular works that are now only known from their descriptions in inventories, where scenes of courtly pleasure were depicted with portrait figures of the princes and their friends. A work belonging to Berry's elder brother Anjou showed the romance of Tristan and Isolde, with King Mark spying on the lovers from a tree above them, giving himself away when they see "the enamelled reflection of his face in the enamelled brook".

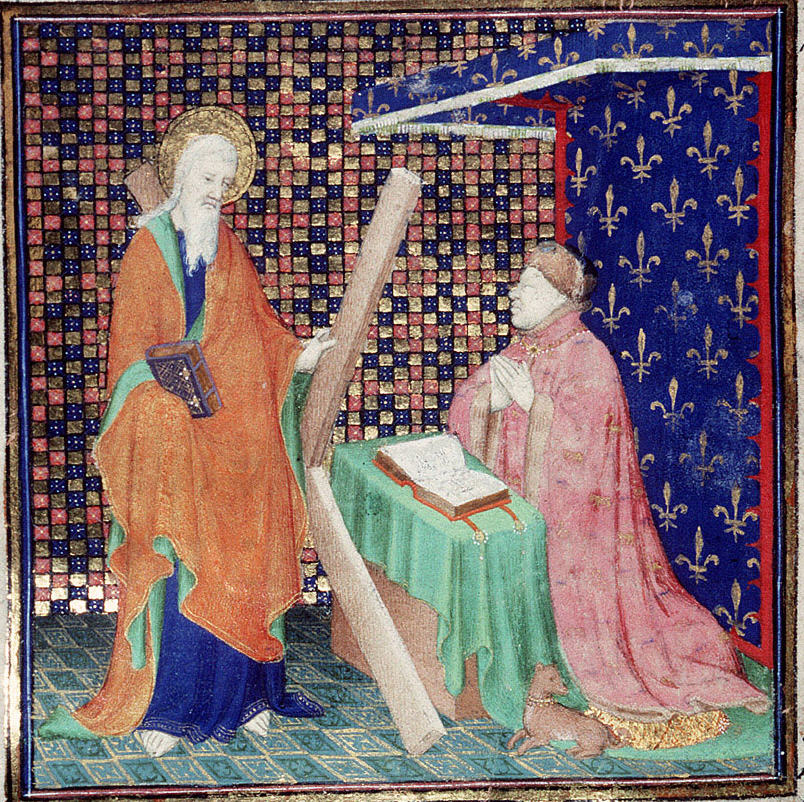
Jean, duc de Berry at prayer, with Saint Andrew, his patron saint.

One work that survived long enough to be recorded in an 18th-century painting had a very similar gold castle as its base, with a paradisal garden within the walls, in this case with trees bearing pearls and red gems. However the rest of the piece was very different in scale, with a single large white enamel figure of the Archangel Michael impaling Satan with a lance-like jewelled cross, completely out of scale with the garden in which he stands. This is the St Michael and the Devil Group, which can be reliably dated to before 1397, when it was given to King Charles VI of France, Berry's nephew, as a New Year's gift by another uncle, Philip the Bold, Duke of Burgundy. It later passed to a church at Ingolstadt in Bavaria, where it remained until it was destroyed in 1801.

Berry was religious as well as worldly, and collected relics as keenly as other types of objects. By 1397 both of his sons had died, he was in his late fifties, and he had begun to think of his tomb, finally deciding to build a new "Sainte Chapelle" in his capital of Bourges to house it. His collection of relics included objects claimed to be the wedding ring of the Virgin Mary, a cup used at the Wedding at Cana, a piece of the Burning Bush, the body of a child murdered by Herod during the Massacre of the Innocents, and many others. However the provenance of the Holy Thorn, as well as its centrality to the Passion of Christ must have given it a special status. The crown from which the thorn came had been bought in 1239 by Louis IX, both a saint and King of France, from the Latin Emperor in Constantinople, Baldwin II, along with a portion of the True Cross. Both had been in Constantinople since the Muslim Conquest of the Holy Land in the 7th century, and may very well be the same relics that Bishop Paulinus of Nola saw in Jerusalem in 409. There are a number of other thorn relics said to have come from the relic in the Paris Sainte Chapelle, including the far smaller Salting Reliquary in the British Museum, a French pendant of about 1340.

Berry may have kept the reliquary with him on his round of visits to his many castles and palaces, or it may have been kept in a chapel, perhaps the Bourges Sainte Chapelle, built in emulation of the king's Paris Sainte Chapelle, where the Crown of Thorns itself was kept. The reliquary is relatively small and would almost certainly have had a custom-made carrying case like that for the Royal Gold Cup, in which the cup came to the British Museum.

== Gallery ==
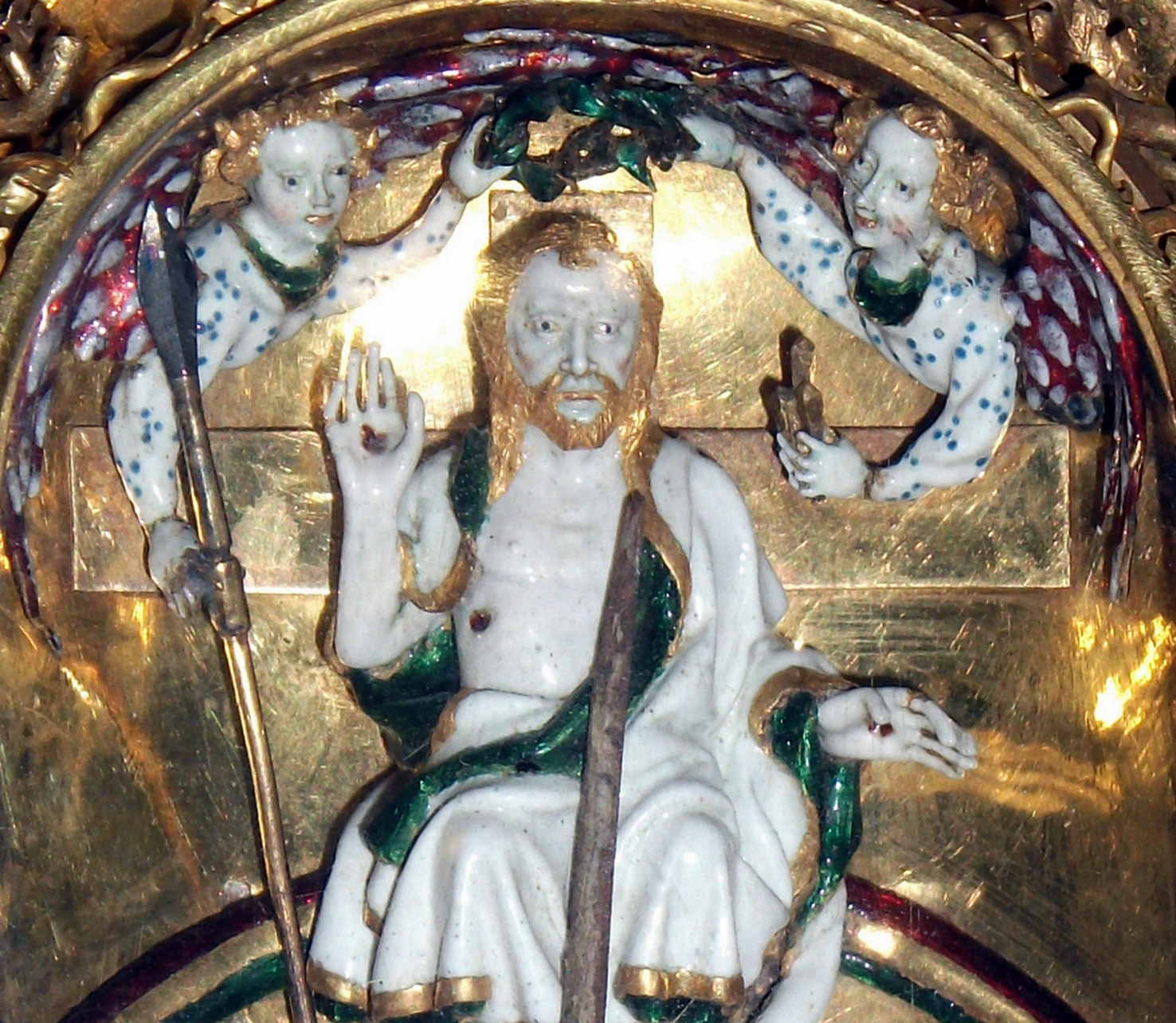
Detail of Christ

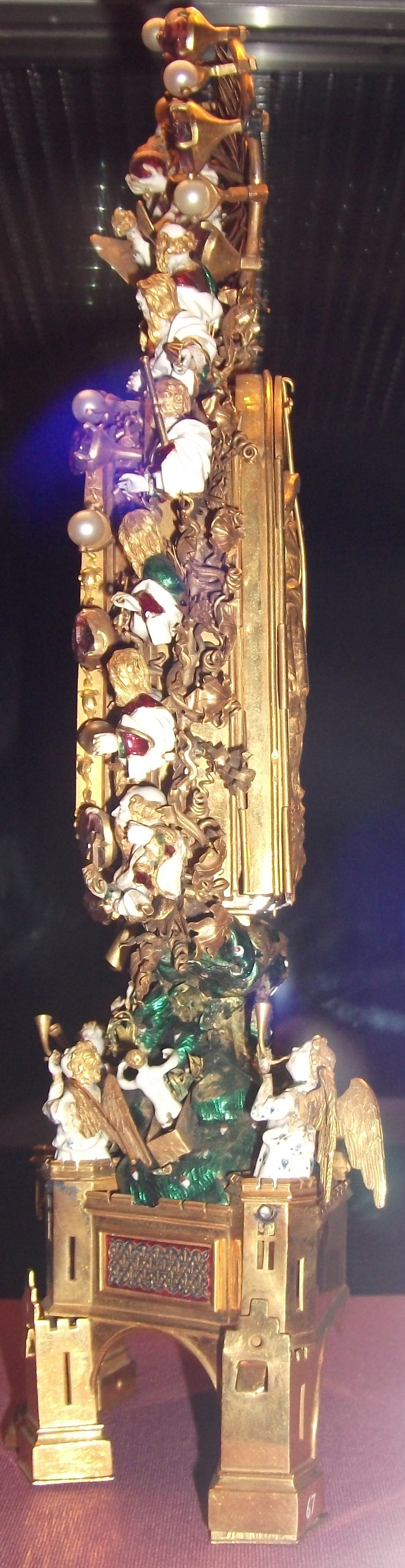
Side view of the reliquary

Berry's arms as they appear on the reliquary: d'azur semé de fleurs de lys d'or, à la bordure engrelée de gueules

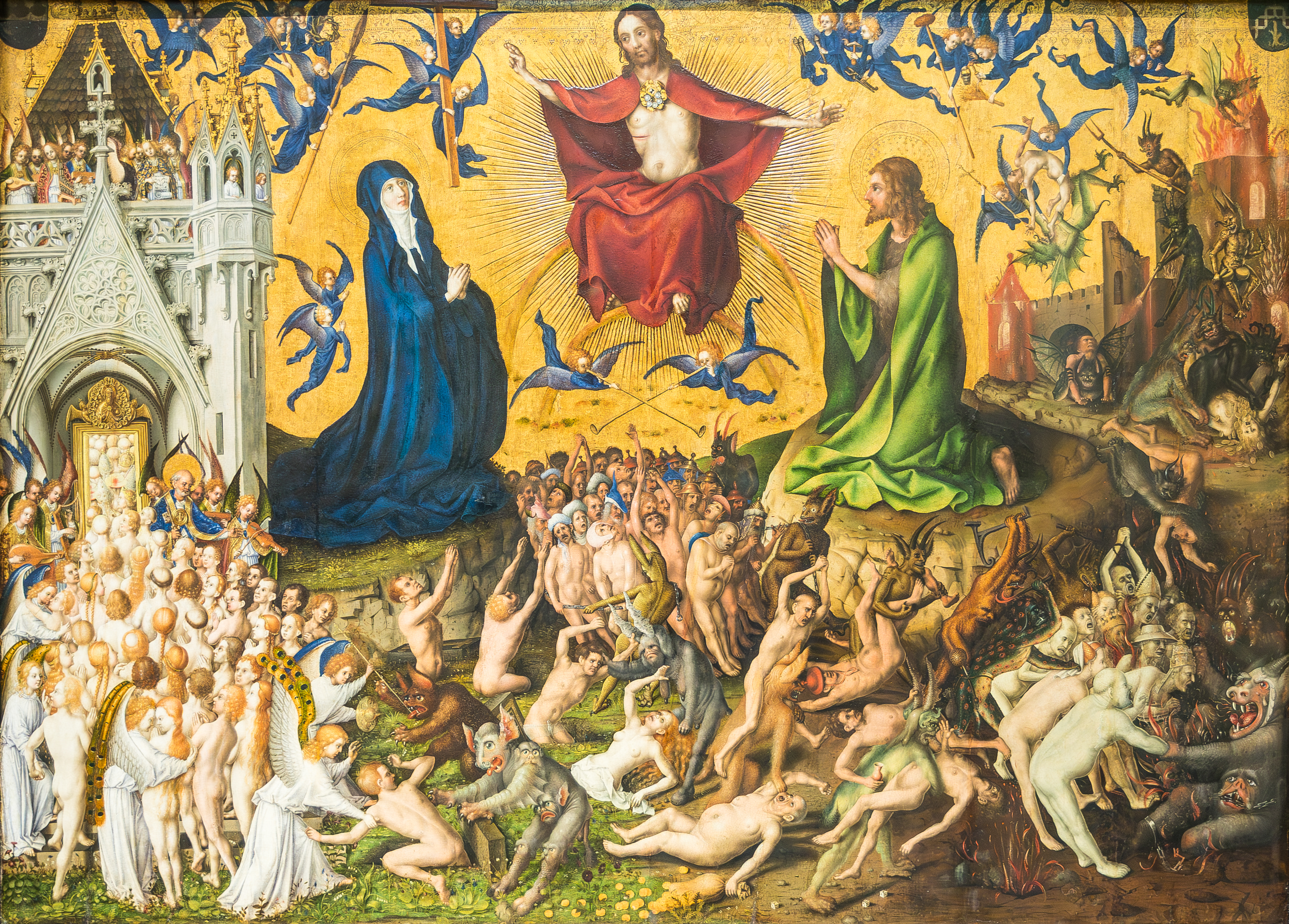
A slightly later German Last Judgement by Stefan Lochner

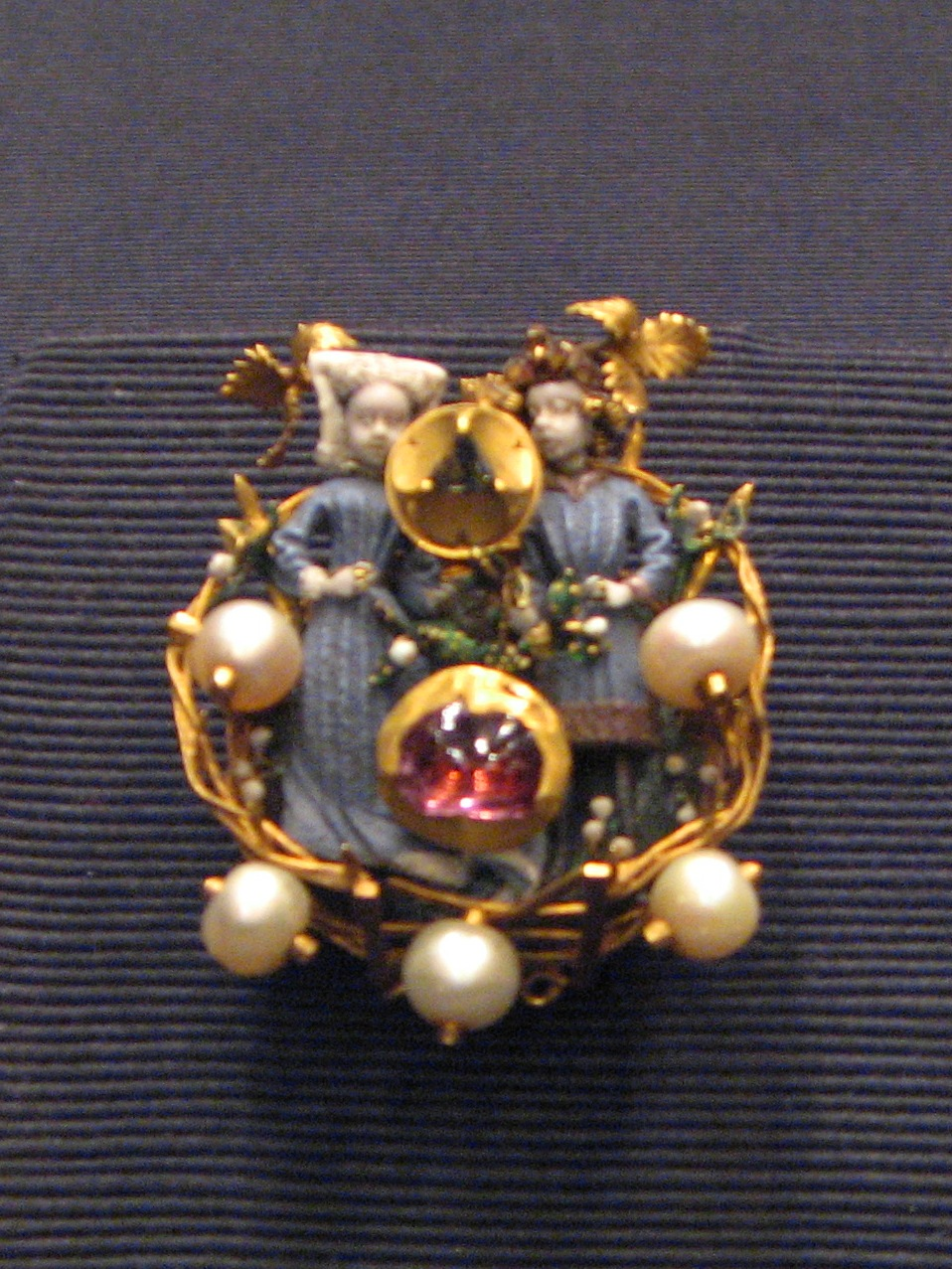
Burgundian brooch with figures in ronde bosse enamel, 1430–40, also inherited by the Habsburgs

== Notes ==
Preceded by 65: Taino Ritual Seat	A History of the World in 100 Objects; Object 66	Succeeded by 67: Icon of the Triumph of Orthodoxy
