= Dunstable Swan Jewel =

Medieval English brooch made around 1400

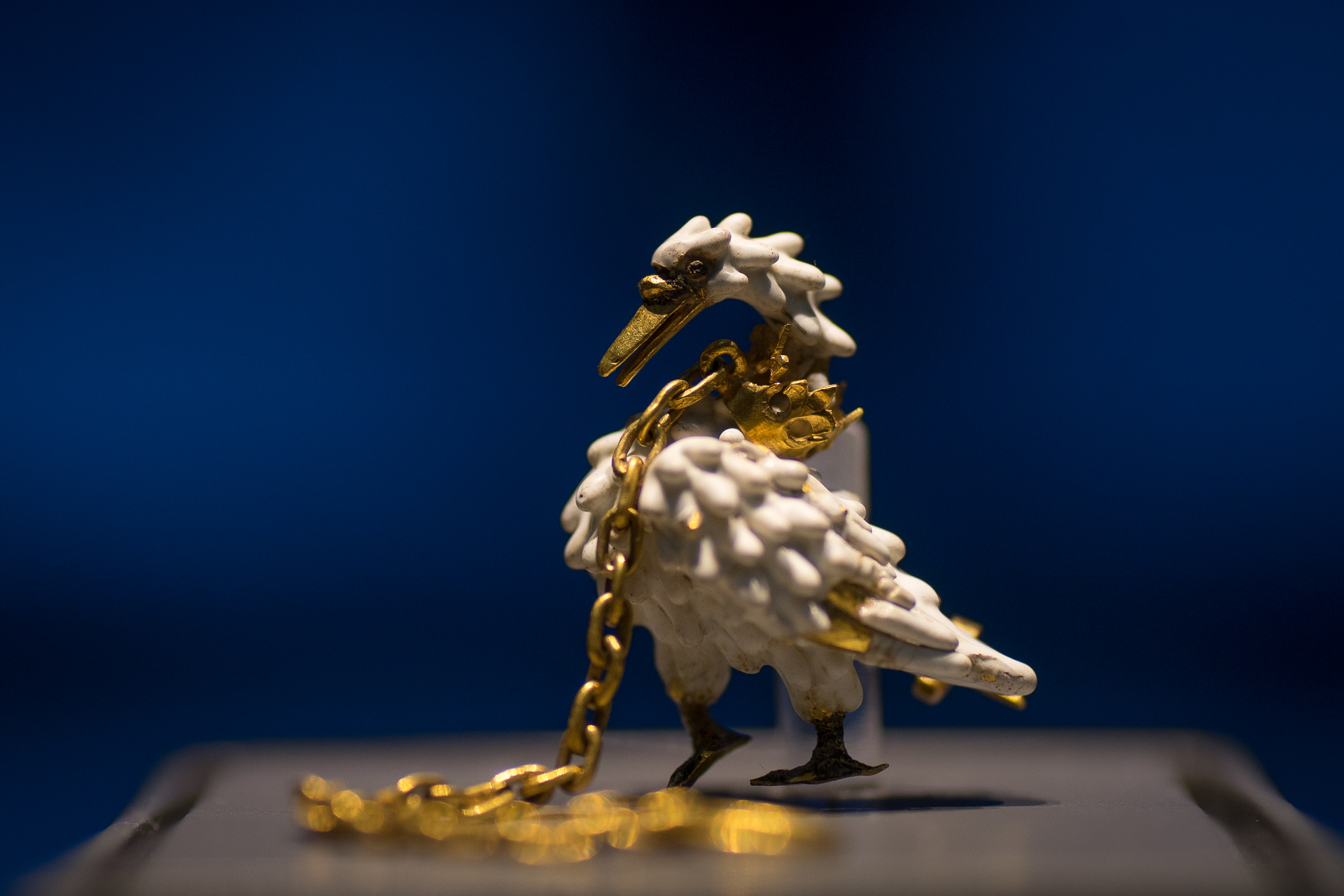
The Dunstable Swan Jewel in the British Museum

The Dunstable Swan Jewel is a gold and enamel brooch in the form of a swan made in England or France in about 1400 and now in the British Museum, where it is on display in Room 40. The jewel was excavated in 1965 on the site of Dunstable Friary in Bedfordshire, and is presumed to have been intended as a livery badge given by an important figure to his supporters; the most likely candidate was probably the future Henry V of England, who was Prince of Wales from 1399.

The jewel is a rare medieval example of the then recently developed and fashionable white opaque enamel used in en ronde bosse to almost totally encase an underlying gold form. It is invariably compared to the White Hart badges worn by King Richard II and by the angels surrounding the Virgin Mary in the painted Wilton Diptych of around the same date, where the chains hang freely down.

The jewel is formed as a standing or walking mute swan gorged (collared) by a gold royal crown with six fleur-de-lys tines. There is a gold chain terminating in a ring attached to the crown, and the swan has a pin and catch on its right side for fastening the brooch to clothes or a hat. The swan is 3.2 cm (1.3 in) high and 2.5 cm (0.98 in) wide, and the length of the chain is 8.2 cm (3.2 in). The swan's body is in white enamel, its eyes are of black enamel, which also once covered the legs and feet, where only traces now remain. Tiny fragments of pink or red enamel remain on the beak.

== Livery badges ==
The Wilton Diptych (c. 1395–99), showing Richard II and the angels wearing Richard's livery badge of the White Hart.

The jewel is a unique survival of the most expensive form of livery badge, otherwise only known from inventories and representations in paintings. These were badges in various forms made for a leading figure bearing his personal device, and given to others who would demonstrate by wearing them that they were in some way his employees, retainers, allies or supporters. They were especially common in England in the age of "bastard feudalism" from the mid-fourteenth century until about the end of the fifteenth century, a period of intense factional conflict which saw the deposition of Richard II and the Wars of the Roses.

A lavish badge like the jewel would only have been worn by the person whose device was represented, members of his family or important supporters, and possibly servants who were in regular very close contact with him. However, the jewel lacks the ultimate luxury of being set with gems, for example ruby eyes, like the gems on the lion pendants worn by Sir John Donne and his wife in their portraits by Hans Memling, now in the National Gallery, London, and several examples listed on the 1397 treasure roll of Richard II. In the Wilton Diptych, Richard's own badge has pearls on the antler tips, which the angels' badges lack. The white hart in the badge on the Treasury Roll, which the painted one may have copied, had pearls and sat on a grass bed made of emeralds, and a hart badge of Richard's inventoried in the possession of Duke Philip the Good of Burgundy in 1435 was set with 22 pearls, two spinels, two sapphires, a ruby and a huge diamond.

Cheaper forms of badge were more widely distributed, sometimes very freely, similarly to modern political campaign badges and t-shirts. However, wearing the wrong badge in the wrong place could lead to personal danger. In 1377, when the young Richard II's highly unpopular uncle, John of Gaunt, was Regent, one of his more than 200 retainers, Sir John Swinton, unwisely rode through London wearing Gaunt's badge on a livery collar (an innovation of Gaunt's, probably the Collar of Esses). The mob attacked him, pulling him off his horse and the badge off him, and he had to be rescued by the mayor from suffering serious harm. Over twenty years later, after Gaunt's son Henry IV had deposed Richard, one of Richard's servants was imprisoned by Henry for continuing to wear Richard's livery badge. Many of the large number of badges of various liveries recovered from the Thames in London were perhaps discarded hurriedly by retainers who found themselves unwisely dressed at various times.

In 1483 King Richard III ordered 13,000 fustian (cloth) badges with his emblem of a boar for the investiture of his son Edward as Prince of Wales, a huge number given the population at the time. Other grades of boar badges that have survived are in lead, silver, and gilded copper high relief, the last found at Richard's home of Middleham Castle in Yorkshire, and very likely worn by one of his household when he was Duke of Gloucester. The British Museum also has a flat lead swan badge with low relief, typical of the cheap metal badges which were similar to the pilgrim badges that were also common in the period.

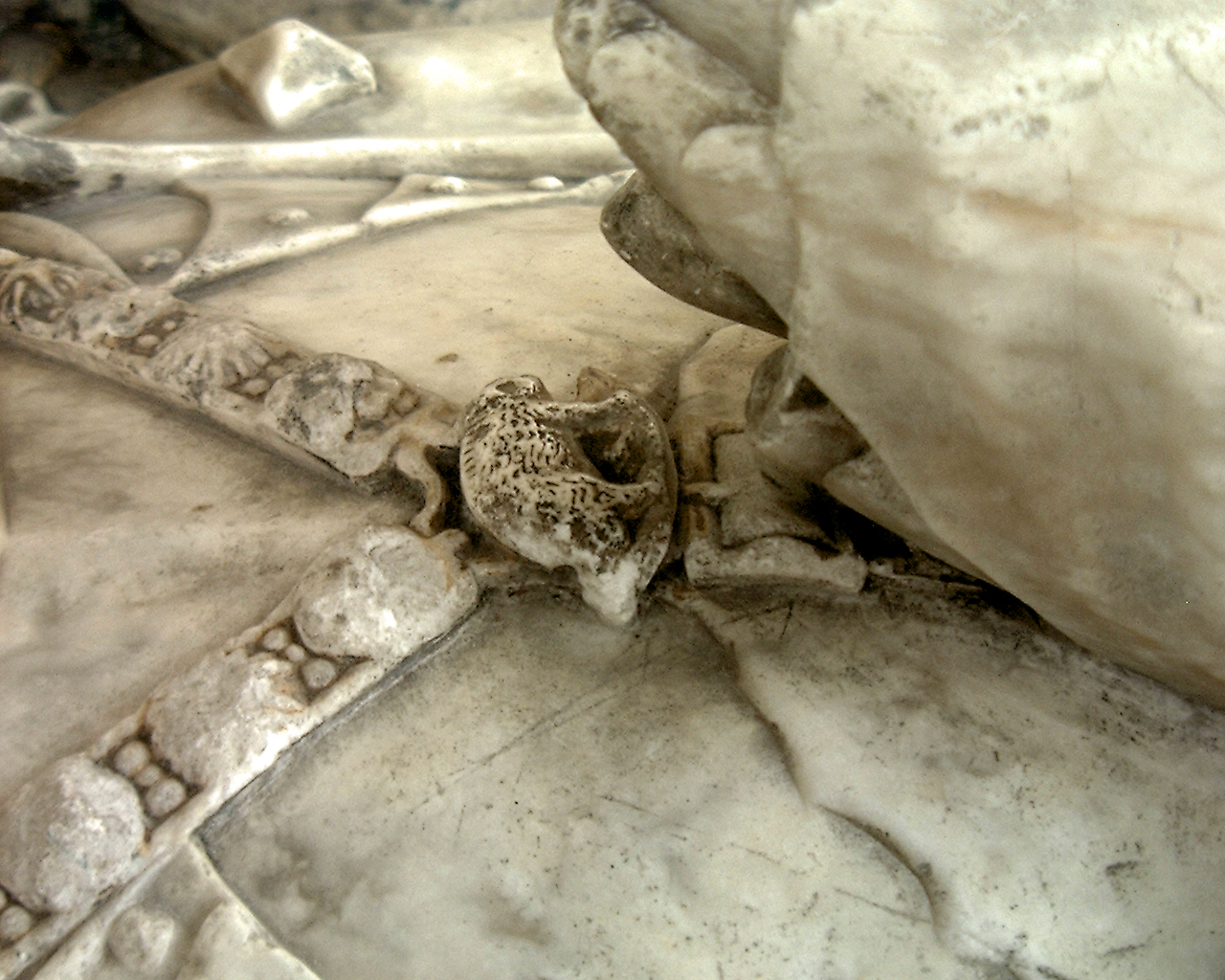
The white boar badge of Richard III as pendant to a Yorkist livery collar on the tomb monument of Sir Ralph Fitzherbert (died 1483) in Norbury, Derbyshire.

Apparently beginning relatively harmlessly under Edward III in a context of tournaments and courtly celebrations, by the reign of his grandson, Richard II, the badges had become seen as a social menace, and were "one of the most protracted controversies of Richard's reign", as they were used to denote the small private armies of retainers kept by lords, largely for the purpose of enforcing their lord's will on the less powerful in his area. Though they were surely a symptom rather than a cause of both local baronial bullying and the disputes between the king and his uncles and other lords, Parliament repeatedly tried to curb the use of livery badges. The issuing of badges by lords was attacked in the Parliament of 1384, and in 1388 they made the startling request that "all liveries called badges [signes], as well of our lord the king as of other lords [...] shall be abolished", because "those who wear them are flown with such insolent arrogance that they do not shrink from practising with reckless effrontery various kinds of extortion in the surrounding countryside [...] and it is certainly the boldness inspired by these badges that makes them unafraid to do these things". Richard offered to give up his own badges, to the delight of the House of Commons of England, but the House of Lords refused to give up theirs, and the matter was put off. In 1390 it was ordered that no-one below the rank of banneret should issue badges, and no one below the rank of esquire wear them. The issue was apparently quiet for a few years, but from 1397 Richard issued increasingly large numbers of badges to retainers who misbehaved (his "Cheshire archers" being especially notorious), and in the Parliament of 1399, after his deposition, several of his leading supporters were forbidden from issuing "badges of signs" again, and a statute was passed allowing only the king (now Henry IV) to issue badges, and only to those ranking as esquires and above, who were only to wear them in his presence. In the end it took a determined campaign by Henry VII to largely stamp out the use of livery badges by others than the king, and reduce them to things normally worn only by household servants.

== The swan as a badge ==
The widespread use of the swan as a badge largely derives from the legend of the Swan Knight, today most familiar from Richard Wagner's opera Lohengrin. A group of Old French chansons de geste called the Crusade cycle had associated the legend with the ancestors of Godfrey of Bouillon (d. 1100), the hero of the First Crusade. Although Godfrey had no legitimate issue, his family had many descendants among the aristocracy of Europe, many of whom made use of the swan in their heraldry or as a para-heraldic emblem. In England these included the important de Bohun family, which used the so-called Bohun swan as its heraldic badge; after the marriage in 1380 of Mary de Bohun (d. 1394) to the future King Henry IV of England, the swan became adopted by the House of Lancaster, who continued to use it for over a century. The swan with the crown and chain is especially associated with Lancastrian use; it echoes the crown and chain of Richard II's white hart, which he began to use as a livery badge from 1390. As well as several of his own white hart badges, Richard's treasure roll of 1397 also includes a swan badge with a gold chain, perhaps presented by one of his enemies mentioned above: "Item, a gold swan enamelled white with a little gold chain hanging around the neck, weighing 2 oz., value, 46s. 8d". He declared to Parliament that he had exchanged liveries with his uncles as a sign of amity at various moments of reconciliation.

After Henry seized the throne in 1399, the use of the swan emblem was transferred to his son, the future Henry V, who was made Prince of Wales at his father's coronation, and whose tomb in Westminster Abbey includes swans. It was also used by his grandson Edward of Westminster, Prince of Wales before his death in the Battle of Tewkesbury in 1471. In 1459 Edward's mother Margaret of Anjou insisted that he give swan livery badges to "all the gentlemen of Cheshire"; the type and number are unknown.

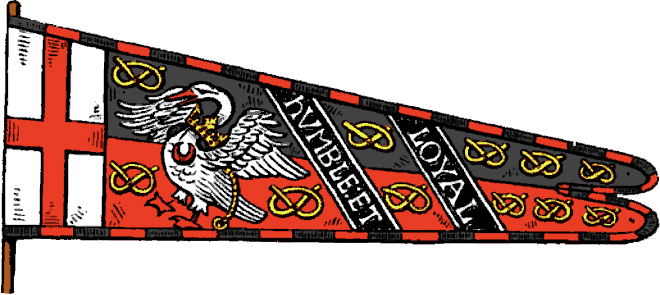
Standard of Henry Stafford, 2nd Duke of Buckingham, about 1475, features the Stafford knot and Bohun swan badges.

The badge was also used by other families; the swan was the crest of the Beauchamp Earls of Warwick, leading supporters of the Lancastrian faction under Thomas de Beauchamp, 12th Earl of Warwick (d. 1401). Eleanor de Bohun, Mary's sister, had in 1376 also married into the Plantagenet royal family, in the person of King Edward III of England's youngest son, Thomas of Woodstock, 1st Duke of Gloucester (d. 1397), another prominent Lancastrian supporter, and the swan badge was used by his Stafford descendants. Mary and Eleanor were co-heiresses to huge Bohun estates, and disputes over the settlement of these continued until late into the next century, when most of their descendants had been killed in the Wars of the Roses, perhaps encouraging the continued assertion of Bohun ancestry. Henry Stafford, 2nd Duke of Buckingham, a descendant of the Beauchamps, Eleanor de Bohun and Thomas of Woodstock, and John of Gaunt, used the swan with crown and chain as his own badge. He was certainly active in trying to get the Bohun lands, and may well have also plotted to seize the throne, for which he was executed in 1483 by Richard III.

== Place and date of manufacture ==
Another user of swan insignia around 1400 was John, Duke of Berry, the Valois prince who commissioned two of the most spectacular medieval works featuring white enamel en ronde bosse, the Holy Thorn Reliquary, also in the British Museum, and the Goldenes Rössl. He has been considered as a possible commissioner of the jewel, in which case it would almost certainly have been made in Paris, and might have made its way to England after being presented. This might also have been the case if it was commissioned by an English person, especially a royal one. However, there are records of London goldsmiths producing white enamel works for the court, and a reliquary with many figures in white ronde bosse enamel and now in the Louvre may have been made in London. Other small jewels have survived in England which may have been made in London, either by native goldsmiths or the foreign ones known to have worked there.

No more precise date for the jewel than "around 1400" is given by experts; this might have a wider range than many works as style is not much help in dating here. Given the royal collar of the swan, the marriage of the future Henry IV to Mary de Bohun probably provides the earliest possible date. A date after Henry IV seized the throne in 1399—when his son would have been using the badge—is perhaps more likely. The difficult technique of adding elements in further colours was not perfected until about 1400, in Paris. Fixing a terminus ante quem is more difficult, but white enamel en ronde bosse became less fashionable after about the 1430s. Moreover, there was no Prince of Wales between 1413, when Henry V succeeded to the throne, and 1454.

== History ==
Dunstable, where the ancient roads of Watling Street and the Icknield Way cross some thirty miles north of London, was frequently visited by the medieval elite. Apart from travellers passing through, tournaments were held there at least until the 1340s, and Lancastrian armies used it as a base in 1459 and 1461. The jewel was found in an excavation of the friary, in what seemed to be a deposit of rubble dating from the destruction of the buildings after the Dissolution of the Monasteries. It would appear to have been above ground until that point. However, it must have been overlooked—the scrap value of the gold itself would have prevented it from being merely discarded. After its excavation, the jewel was bought by the British Museum in 1966 for £5,000, of which £666 was a grant from the Art Fund (then NACF); other contributions were made by the Pilgrim Trust and the Worshipful Company of Goldsmiths. It is on display in Room 40.
