= Heraldic badge =

Badge indicating allegiance

The Prince of Wales's feathers, which is the badge of the Prince of Wales as heir apparent to the crown of the United Kingdom

A heraldic badge, emblem, impresa, or device, is a graphic symbol worn or displayed to indicate allegiance to, or the property of, an individual, family or corporate body. Medieval forms may also be called a livery badge, or a cognizance. Such badges are para-heraldic, as they do not necessarily use elements from the coat of arms of the person or family they represent – although many do, often borrowing from the crest or supporters. Their use is more flexible than that of arms proper.

Badges worn on clothing were common in the late Middle Ages, particularly in England. They could be made of base metal, cloth or other materials and worn on the clothing of the followers of the person in question; grander forms would be worn by important persons, with the Dunstable Swan Jewel in enamelled gold a rare survivor. Livery collars were also given to important persons, often with the badge as a pendant. The badge would also be embroidered or appliqued on standards, horse trappings, livery uniforms, and other belongings. Many medieval badges survive in English pub names.

== Medieval usage ==
=== Origins ===
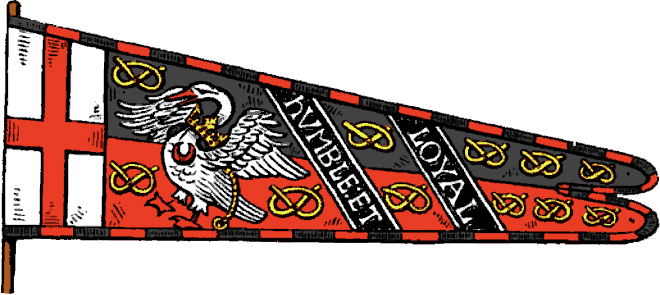
Standard of Henry Stafford, 2nd Duke of Buckingham, about 1475, features the Stafford knot and Bohun swan badges.

Badges with "a distinctly heraldic character" in England date to about the reign (1327–1377) of King Edward III. In the fourteenth, fifteenth, and sixteenth centuries, the followers, retainers, dependants, and partisans of famous and powerful personages and houses bore well-known badges – precisely because they were known and recognised. (In contrast, the coat of arms was used exclusively by the individual to whom it belonged.)

Badges occasionally imitated a charge in the bearer's coat of arms, or had a more or less direct reference to such a charge. More often, badges commemorated some remarkable exploit, illustrated a family or feudal alliance, or indicated some territorial rights or pretensions. Some badges are rebuses, making a pun or play-on-words of the owner's name. It was not uncommon for the same personage or family to use more than one badge; and, on the other hand, two or more badges were often borne in combination, to form a single compound device.

=== Livery badges in England ===
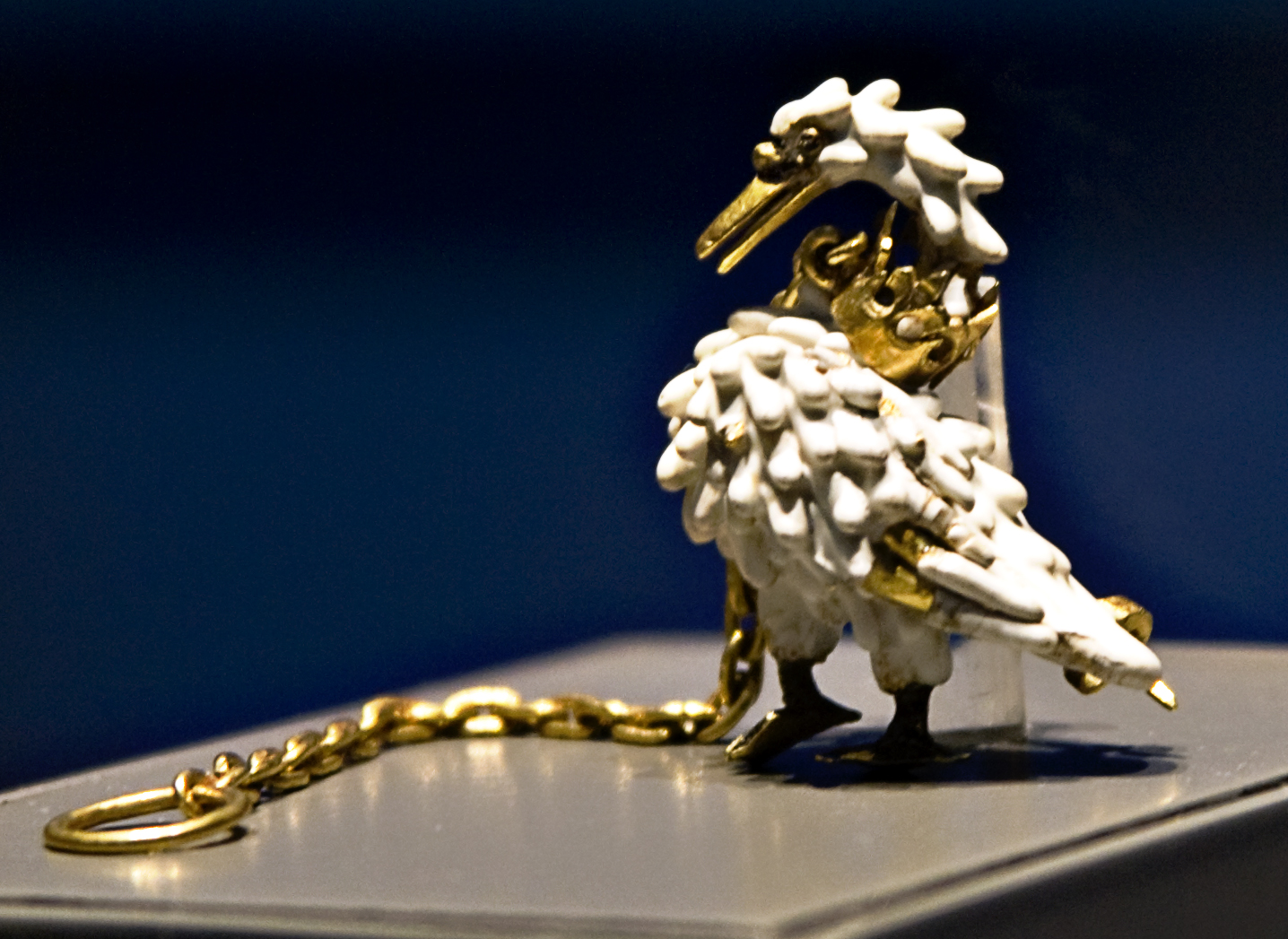
The Dunstable Swan Jewel, a livery badge from about 1400 AD, perhaps of Henry V as Prince of Wales. British Museum

Livery badges were especially common in England from the mid-fourteenth century until about the end of the fifteenth century, a period of intense factional conflict which saw the deposition of Richard II and the Wars of the Roses. A lavish badge like the Dunstable Swan Jewel would only have been worn by the person whose device was represented, members of his family or important supporters, and possibly servants who were in regular very close contact with him. However the jewel lacks the ultimate luxury of being set with gems, for example having ruby eyes, like the lion pendants worn by Sir John Donne and his wife and several examples listed on the 1397 treasure roll of King Richard II. In the Wilton Diptych, Richard's own badge has pearls on the antler tips, which the angels' badges lack. The white hart in the badge on the Treasury Roll, which the painted one may have copied, had pearls and sat on a grass bed made of emeralds, and a hart badge of Richard's inventoried in the possession of Duke Philip the Good of Burgundy in 1435 was set with 22 pearls, two spinels, two sapphires, a ruby and a huge diamond.

Cheaper forms of badge were more widely distributed, sometimes very freely indeed, rather as modern political campaign buttons and tee-shirts are, though as in some modern countries wearing the wrong badge in the wrong place could lead to personal danger. In 1483 King Richard III ordered 13,000 badges in fustian cloth with his emblem of a white boar for the investiture of his son Edward as Prince of Wales, a huge number given the population at the time. Other grades of boar badges that have survived are in lead, silver, and gilded copper relief, the last found at Richard's home of Middleham Castle in Yorkshire, and very likely worn by one of his household when he was Duke of York. The British Museum also has a swan badge in flat lead, typical of the cheap metal badges which were similar to the pilgrim badges that were also common in the period.

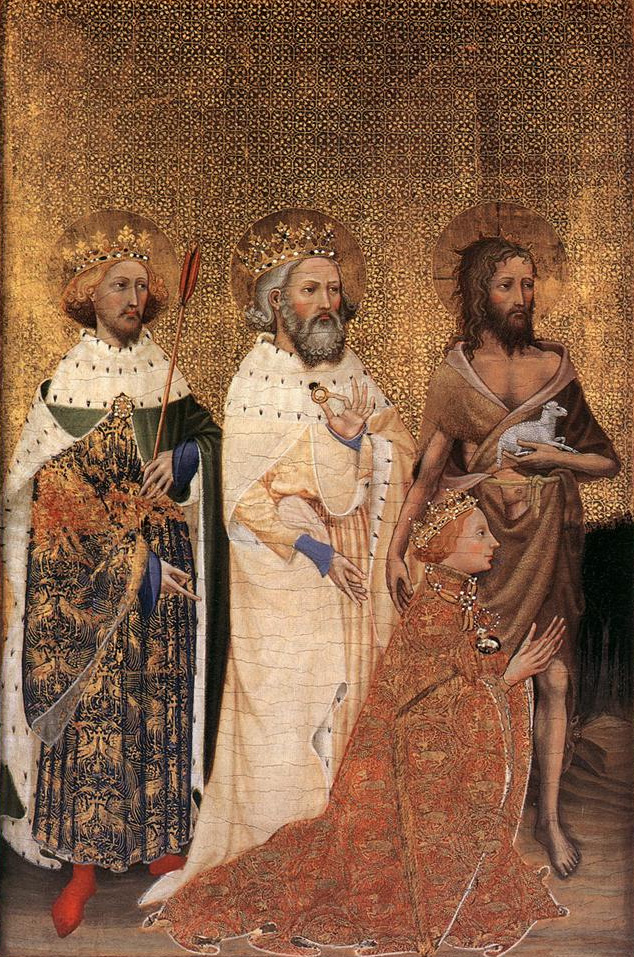
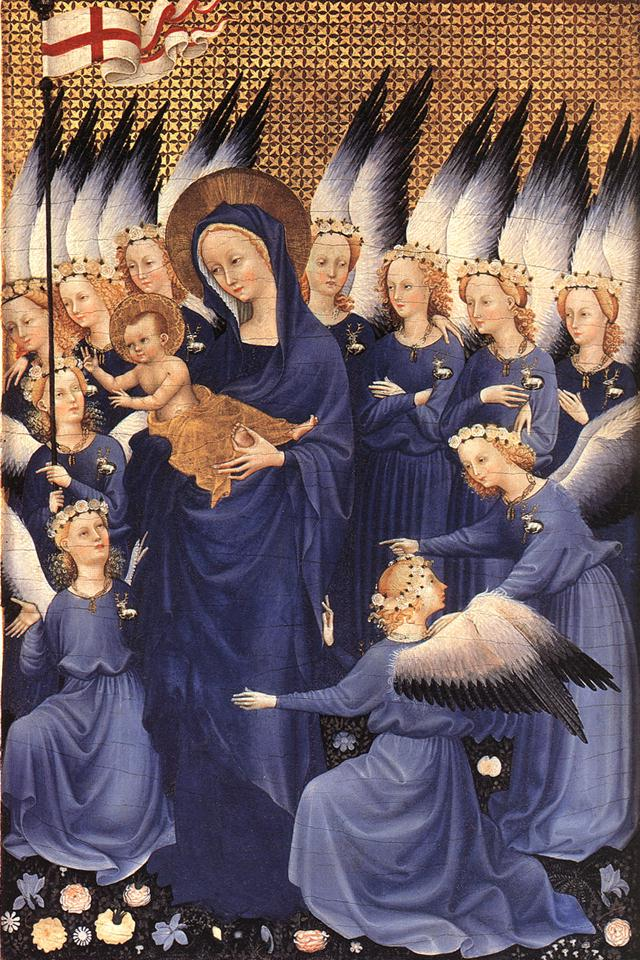
The Wilton Diptych (c. 1395–99), showing Richard II and the angels wearing livery badges

In 1377, during a period when the young Richard's uncle John of Gaunt as Regent was highly unpopular in London, one of his more than 200 retainers, the Scottish knight Sir John Swinton, unwisely rode through London wearing Gaunt's badge on a livery collar (an innovation of Gaunt's, probably the Collar of Esses). The mob attacked him, pulling him off his horse and the badge off him, and he had to be rescued by the mayor from suffering serious harm. Over twenty years later, after Gaunt's son Henry IV had deposed Richard, one of Richard's servants was imprisoned by Henry for continuing to wear Richard's livery badge. Many of the large number of badges of various liveries recovered from the Thames in London were perhaps discarded hurriedly by retainers who found themselves impoliticly dressed at various times.

Apparently beginning relatively harmlessly under Edward III in a context of tournaments and courtly celebrations, by the reign of his successor Richard II the badges had become seen as a social menace, and were "one of the most protracted controversies of Richard's reign", as they were used to denote the small private armies of retainers kept by lords, largely for the purpose of enforcing their lord's will on the less powerful in his area. Though they were surely a symptom rather than a cause of both local baronial bullying and the disputes between the king and his uncles and other lords, Parliament repeatedly tried to curb the use of livery badges. The issuing of badges by lords was attacked in the Parliament of 1384, and in 1388 they made the startling request that "all liveries called badges [signes], as well of our lord the king as of other lords ... shall be abolished", because "those who wear them are flown with such insolent arrogance that they do not shrink from practising with reckless effrontery various kinds of extortion in the surrounding countryside ... and it is certainly the boldness inspired by these badges that makes them unafraid to do these things". Richard offered to give up his own badges, to the delight of the House of Commons of England, but the House of Lords refused to give up theirs, and the matter was put off. In 1390 it was ordered that no one below the rank of banneret should issue badges, and no one below the rank of esquire wear them. The issue was apparently quiet for a few years, but from 1397 Richard issued increasingly large numbers of badges to retainers who misbehaved (his "Cheshire archers" being especially notorious), and in the Parliament of 1399, after his deposition, several of his leading supporters were forbidden from issuing "badges of signes" again, and a statute was passed allowing only the king (now Henry IV) to issue badges, and only to those ranking as esquires and above, who were only to wear them in his presence.

The Tudor Rose badge of the House of Tudor

In the end it took a determined campaign by Henry VII to largely stamp out the use of livery badges by others than the king, and reduce them to things normally worn only by household servants in the case of the aristocracy. Livery badges issues by guilds and corporations, and mayors, were exempt, and these continued in use until the 19th century in some cases. A particular concern in all the legislation was to forbid the issuing of liveries to those without a permanent contract with the lord; these groups assembled for a particular purpose were believed to be the most dangerous. The Statute of Liveries of 1506 finally forbade entirely the issuing of liveries to those of higher rank; they had to be domestic servants or persons experienced in the law, unless covered by a specific royal licence. A well-known story, first told by Francis Bacon but unsupported in the remaining records, has Henry visiting his principal military commander John de Vere, 13th Earl of Oxford at Hedingham Castle, who at his departure lined the king's exit route with liveried retainers, for which Henry fined him 15,000 marks. In fact modern historical analysis of the court records shows few prosecutions, but by the end of Henry's reign liveried retainers do seem to have ceased to be a major problem. While the badges of the nobility were carefully restricted, the royal badges of the Tudors, most famously the Tudor rose that signified the union of the Lancastrian and Yorkist dynasties, were used more widely than ever before, for example being added freely to King's College Chapel, Cambridge when the Tudors completed Henry VI's unfinished building. The Collar of Esses became in effect a badge of office, though of course still denoting allegiance to the monarch.

== Renaissance and early modern personal device ==
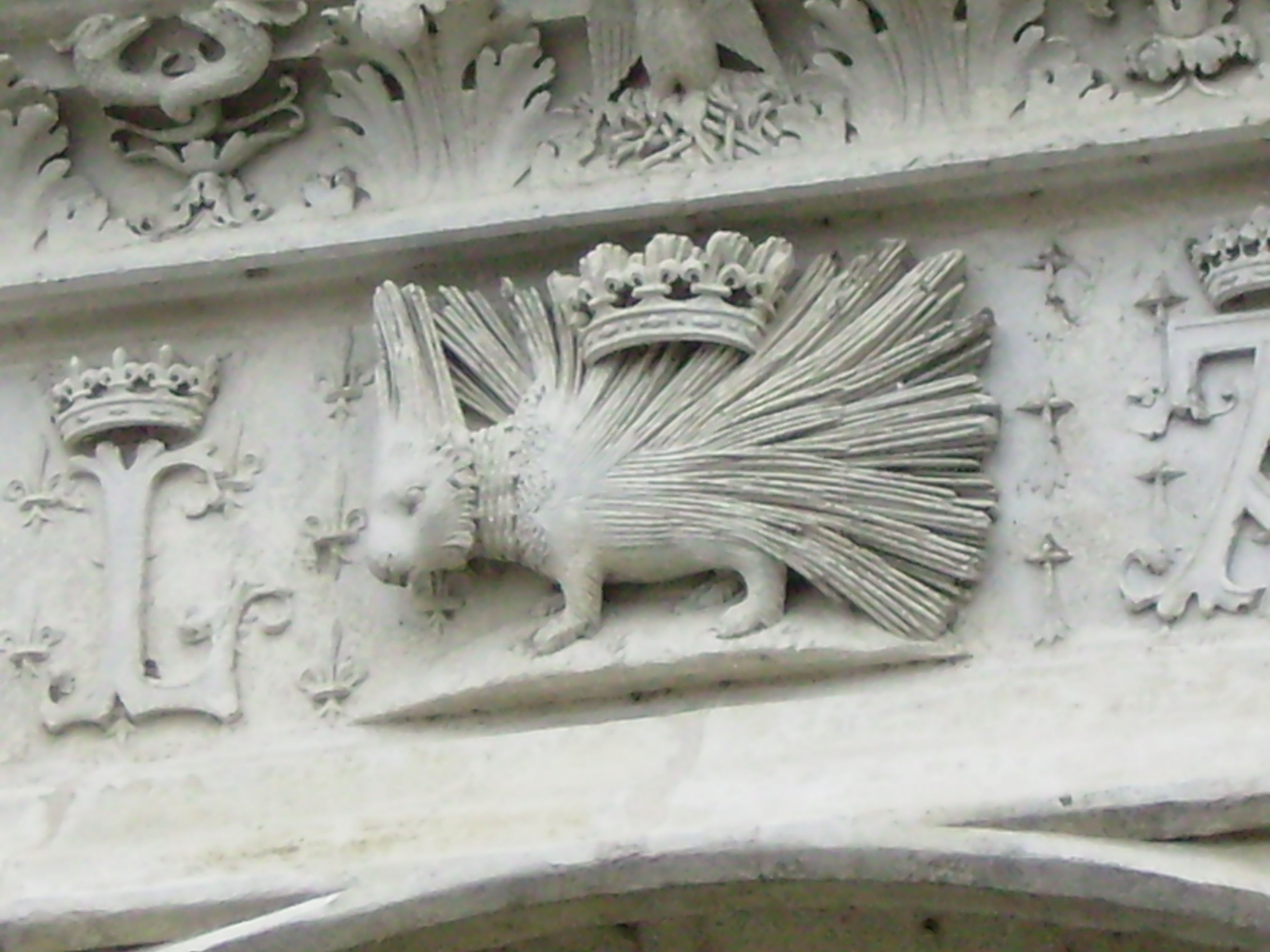
The Château de Blois, with the porcupine of Louis XII

In the Renaissance, the badge, now more likely to be described as a "personal device", took an intellectual turn, and was usually combined with a short text or motto, which when read in combination were intended to convey a sense of the aspirations or character of the bearer. These impresas or emblems were used on the reverse of the portrait-medals that became fashionable in Italy, and used the vocabulary of Renaissance Neo-Platonism, often dropping links to the actual heraldry of the owner completely. Indeed, by the 16th century, emblems were adopted by intellectuals and merchants who had no heraldry of their own. Later emblem books contained large numbers of emblems, partly to allow people to choose one they thought suited them.

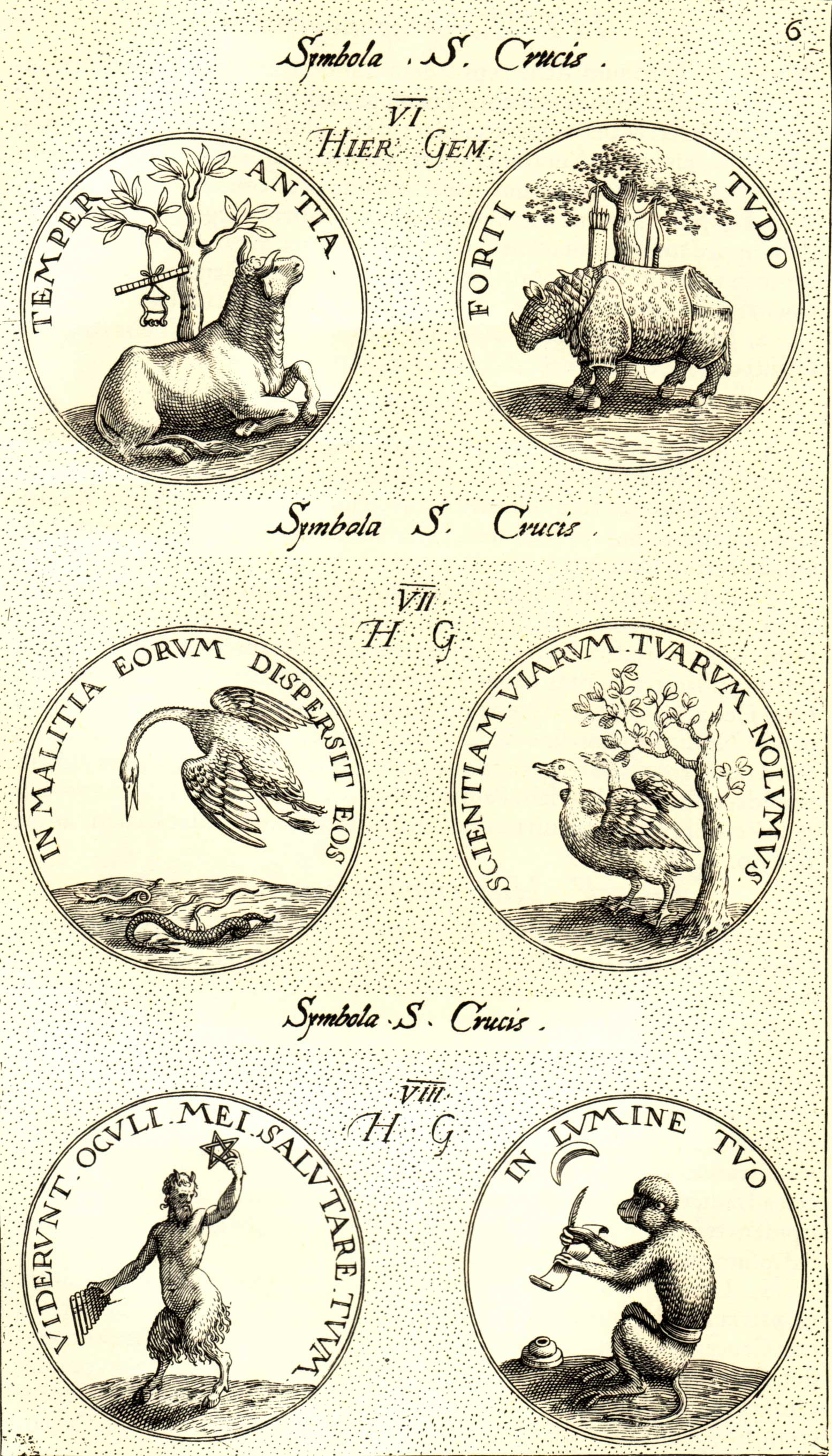
Imprese from Jacobus Typotius, Symbola Divina et Humana (Prague, 1601), engraved by Aegidius Sadeler II

By the later sixteenth century, allegorical badges called impresa were adopted by individuals as part of an overall programme of theatrical disguise for a specific event or series of events, such as the fancy dress jousts of the Elizabethan era typified by the Accession Day tilts.

The device spread far beyond the aristocracy as part of the craze for wittily enigmatic constructions in which combinations of pictures and texts were intended to be read together to generate a meaning that could not be derived from either part alone. The device, to all intents and purposes identical to the Italian impresa, differs from the emblem in two principal ways. Structurally, the device normally consists of two parts while most emblems have three or more. As well, the device was highly personal, intimately attached to a single individual, while the emblem was constructed to convey a general moral lesson that any reader might apply in his or her own life.

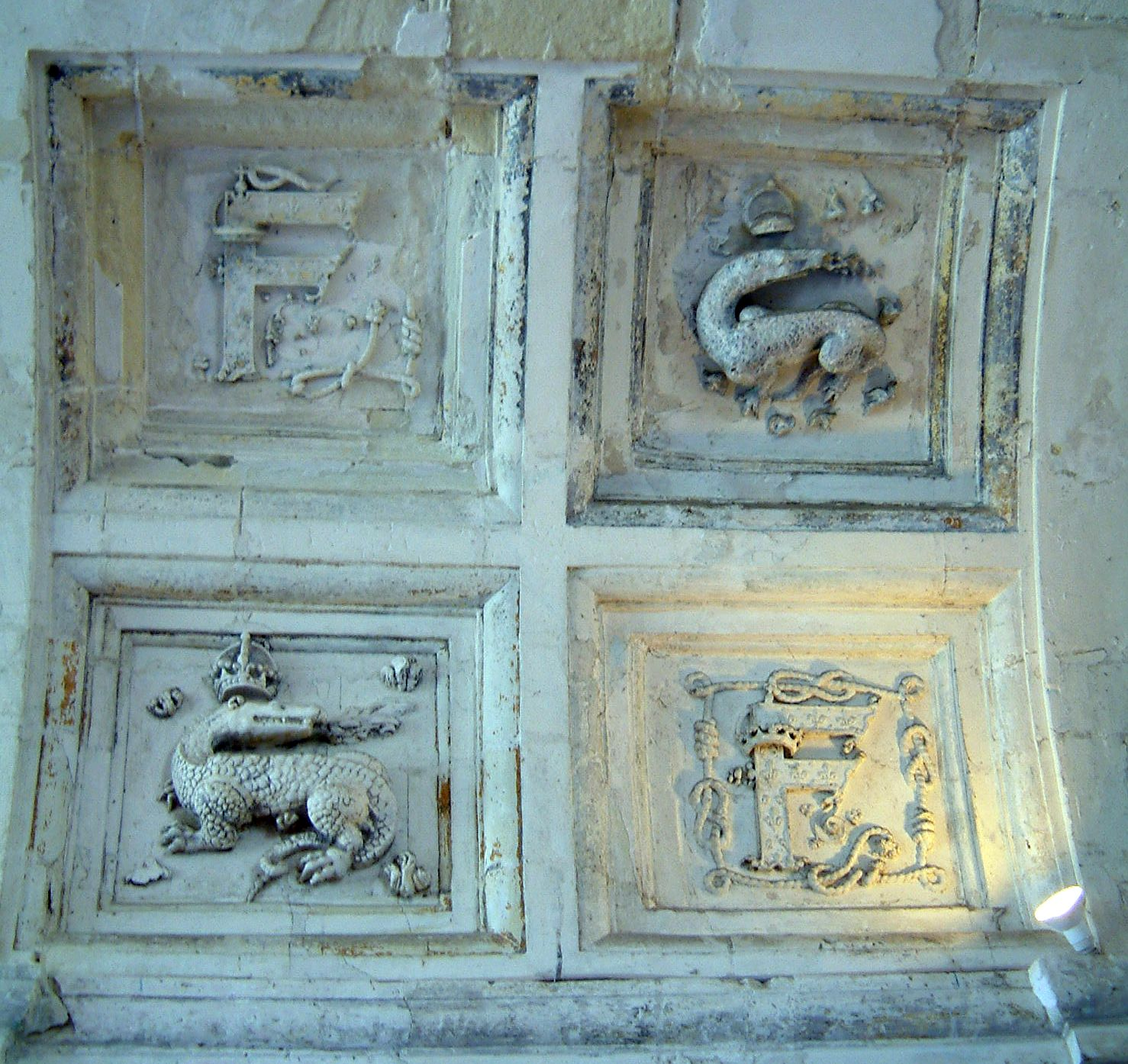
Salamander badge of King Francis I of France, with letter "F", Château de Chambord

Particularly well-known examples of devices – so well known that the image could be understood as representing the bearer even without the motto – are those of several French kings, which were freely used to decorate their building projects. These include the porcupine of Louis XII with its motto "Eminus et cominus" or "De pres et de loin" (left, over a doorway at Blois) and the crowned salamander among flames of François Ier with the motto "Nutrisco et extinguo" (right, at Chambord). These and many more were collected by Claude Paradin and published in his Devises héroïques of 1551 and 1557, which gives the motto of Louis XII as "Ultos avos Troiae". Later the sun of Louis XIV was equally famous.

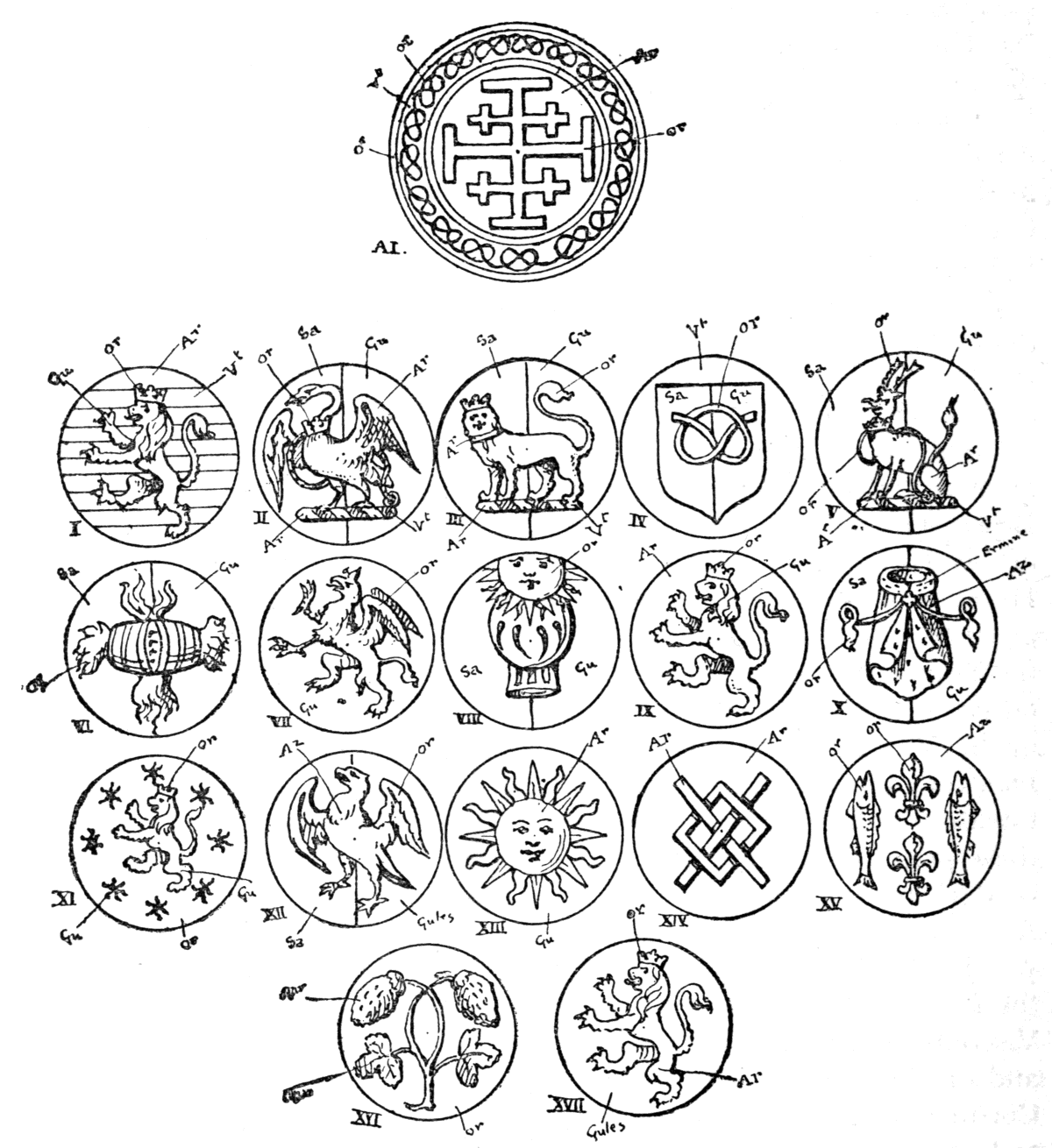
Badges of Earls of Stafford, 1720

== Famous English badges ==
- Bohun swan, a swan argent gorged and chained or: Badge of the De Bohun family and descendants
- Bear and ragged staff: both badges of the Beauchamp Earls of Warwick were sometimes united to form a single badge. The successors of that family, including Robert Dudley, Earl of Leicester, bore the "bear and ragged staff" as a single device.
- Prince of Wales's feathers: the personal badge of the Prince of Wales derives from the "shield for peace" of Edward, the Black Prince. A swan was also used by several Princes of Wales, as in the Dunstable Swan Jewel.
- Roses: the Tudor rose badge adopted by Henry VII of England combines the White Rose of York and the Red Rose of Lancaster, the two warring houses of the Wars of the Roses.
- Stafford knot: a distinctive three-looped knot originally borne by the Dukes of Buckingham, and today pictured in the coat of arms of Staffordshire County Council.
- White Hart: the personal badge of Richard II of England. A white hind was the badge of Christopher Hatton, Lord Chancellor under Elizabeth I.
- White Boar: the personal badge of Richard Duke of Gloucester, later Richard III.

== Badges of English royalty ==
Modern badge of the House of Windsor

- William II: a flower of five foils
- Henry I: a flower of eight foils
- Stephen: a flower of seven foils; a Sagittarius; a Plume of Ostrich Feathers; Motto: Vi nulla invertitur ordo (No force alters their fashion)
- Henry II: the Planta-genista; an Escarbuncle; a Sword and Olive branch
- Richard I: a star of thirteen rays and a crescent; a star issuing from a crescent; a mailed arm grasping a broken lance, with the motto Christo Duce
- John and Henry III: a star issuing from a crescent
- Edward I: a heraldic rose or, stalked proper
- Edward II: a castle of Castile
- Edward III: a Fleur-de-Lys; a Leopard, a Sword; a falcon; a Gryphon; a Stock (stump) of a tree; rays issuing from a cloud
- Richard II: a White Hart lodged; the Stock (stump) of a tree; a white falcon; a Sun in Splendor; a Sun Clouded
- Henry IV: the Monogram (cypher) SS; a crowned eagle; an eagle displayed; a white swan; a red rose; a Columbine flower; a fox's tail; a crowned panther; the Stock (stump) of a tree; a Crescent
- Henry V: a fire-beacon; a white swan gorged and chained; a chained antelope
- Henry VI: two ostrich feathers in Saltire; a chained antelope; a panther
- Edward IV: a white rose en Soleil; a white wolf and white lion; a white Hart; a black dragon and black bull; a falcon and Fetter-lock; the Sun in Splendor
- Richard III: the White Boar, the Sun in Splendor
- Henry VII: a Rose of York and Lancaster (a Tudor Rose); a Portcullis and a Fleur-de-Lis, all of them crowned; a red dragon; a white greyhound; a Hawthorn Bush and Crown, with the cypher H.R.
- Henry VIII: the same, without the Hawthorn Bush and with a White Cockerel
  - Catherine of Aragon: a rose, pomegranate, and Sheaf of Arrows
  - Anne Boleyn: a crowned falcon, holding a Sceptre
  - Jane Seymour: a phoenix rising from a castle, between two Tudor Roses
  - Catherine Parr: a Maiden's Head crowned, rising from a large Tudor Rose
- Edward VI: a Tudor Rose; the sun in splendor
- Mary I: a Tudor Rose impaling a pomegranate, also impaling a Sheaf of Arrows, ensigned with a Crown, and surrounded with Rays; a pomegranate
- Elizabeth I: a Tudor Rose, with the motto, Rosa sine Spina (a Rose without a Thorn); a crowned falcon and sceptre; her motto, Semper Eadem (Always the same)

== Royal badges of British monarchs ==
- James I: a thistle; a thistle and a Tudor rose dimidiated and Crowned, with the motto Beati Pacifici (Blessed are the peacemakers)
- Charles I, Charles II and James II: same as James I, without his motto
- Anne: a Tudor rose-branch and a thistle growing from one branch

With the accession of the House of Hanover in 1714, British monarchs ceased to use personal badges (Royal Cyphers came into use instead), though historical badges continue to be used for various purposes as part of royal symbolism (such as the titles of pursuivants in the College of Arms), and there is now a general badge of the House of Windsor.

- Elizabeth II in addition to all her other badges assumed two badges for Wales, one in 1953 and 2008.

== Revival ==
Heraldic badges were revived in 1906 by the College of Arms under Alfred Scott-Gatty, and have since then often been included in new grants of arms, in addition to the traditional grant of the coat of arms. Whether or not they are so granted is at the option of the grantee, who pays a higher fee if they are. When granted, the badge is typically illustrated on the letters patent containing the grant of arms, and upon a heraldic standard (flag). The standard is not however granted automatically with the said achievement of arms and badge, but can be requested if a badge is granted and upon payment of a further fee.

== See also ==
- Royal cypher
- Tughra
- Badge of the Royal Air Force
- Distinctive unit insignia
- Cap badge
- Naval heraldry
- Royal Badges of England
- Scottish crest badge
