= Wilton Diptych =

C. 1395–1399 English panel painting

The Wilton Diptych, c. 1395–1399. Each panel is 53 cm × 37 cm (21 in × 15 in).

The Wilton Diptych (made c. 1395–1399) is a small portable diptych of two hinged panels, painted on both sides, now in the National Gallery, London. It is an extremely rare survival of a late medieval religious panel painting from England. The diptych was painted for King Richard II of England, who is depicted kneeling before the Virgin and Child in what is known as a donor portrait. He is presented to them by (left to right) the English saints King Edmund the Martyr, King Edward the Confessor and patron saint, John the Baptist. The painting is an outstanding example of the International Gothic style, and the nationality of the unknown artist is probably French or English. It takes its name from Wilton House in Wiltshire, where it was kept by the Earls of Pembroke before it was bought by the National Gallery in 1929.

== Description ==
The Wilton Diptych is painted on two panels of Baltic oak, set in frames of the same material and joined by two hinges so that it may be closed to protect the inner painting. The inner faces of the panels are in excellent condition for their age, though some glazes have been lost, and the outer faces have paint losses from handling.

The painting is in tempera, the ground paint being mixed with egg yolk and laid in thin glazes. The background and many details are inlaid with gold leaf and in places the panel has been tooled beneath the gilding to enhance the decorative quality. In the panel with the Virgin and Christ Child, the garments are universally blue, the pigment coming from the semi-precious stone lapis lazuli. Richard's robe uses vermilion, another expensive pigment. Some colours have faded; the roses in the angels' hair would originally have been a much deeper pink, and the green grass of the outer hart panel is now much darker than when painted.

Although the figures of the two inner scenes face each other, and interact by gaze and gesture, they are set in different backgrounds. The human figures are on bare rocky ground, with a forest behind, and a gold leaf "sky" decorated with a pattern made by a metal punch. The heavenly figures stand in a flowery meadow, behind which is a gold background patterned by a different punch.

In the left inner panel the kneeling King Richard II is presented by Saints John the Baptist, Edward the Confessor and Edmund the Martyr, each holding their attribute. In the right-hand panel the Virgin Mary with the Christ Child in her arms is surrounded by eleven angels, against a golden background and field of delicately coloured flowers.

Richard's outer robe is of cloth of gold and red vermilion, the fabric decorated with his personal device of the White Harts and sprigs of rosemary, the emblem of his wife Anne of Bohemia, who died in 1394. Around his neck is a gold collar with broomscods, seed-pods of Cytisus scoparius, the common broom, which is the planta genista that gave Richard's Plantagenet dynasty its name. They were also the emblem of Charles VI of France, whose daughter he married in 1396. Richard had been given such a collar by Charles in 1393, and wearing one here may indicate a date for the work after Richard's second marriage to the six-year-old Isabella of Valois in 1396. The livery badges worn by both Richard and the angels appear to be made in the fashionable and expensive technique of ronde bosse white enamel on gold; they are comparable to the surviving Dunstable Swan Jewel, probably given by one of Richard's cousins in the House of Lancaster. Richard's badge, but not those of the angels, has pearls tipping the antlers, and may perhaps be based on one of several examples recorded in his treasure roll of 1397, which had pearls and a bed of emeralds for the hind to sit on. A hart badge of Richard's inventoried in the possession of Duke Philip the Good of Burgundy in 1435 was set with 22 pearls, two spinels, two sapphires, a ruby and a huge diamond.

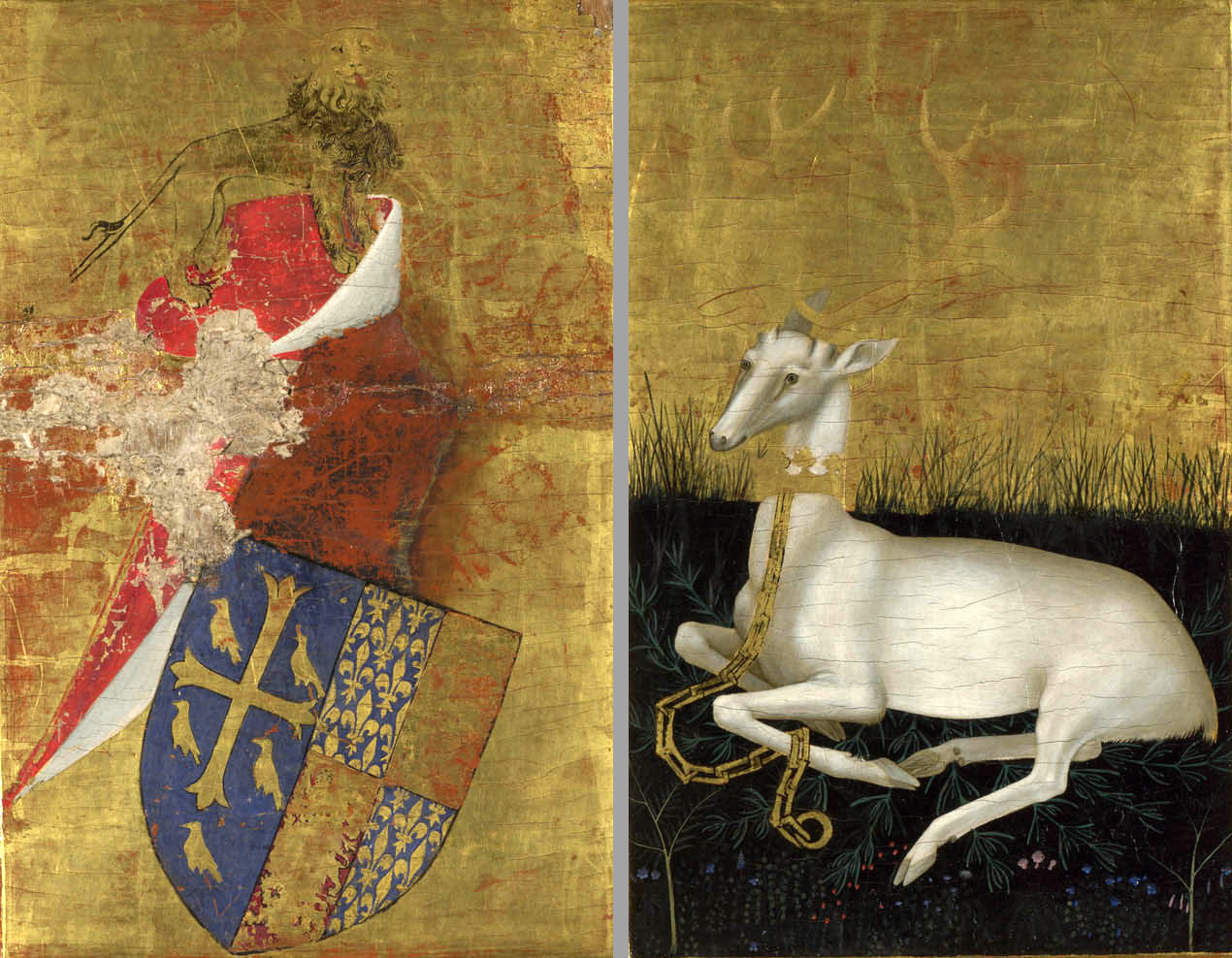
The outer sides of the diptych. Richard's arms (l.) and White Hart emblem (r.)

Although thematically linked, the composition of the two pictures is quite different in feeling. The scene of Richard and his patrons is very sedate, but full of rich contrasts in colour and texture. The scene of the Virgin and Child is full of energetic movement created by the angels who encircle the mother and child. The predominant brilliant blue gives a precious quality, symbolising the heavenly nature of this apparition. The flowery ground also symbolises the gardens of Paradise. The strong tonal contrast of the angels' wings throw the figures into relief against the background.

When closed, the diptych reveals on one side a white hart or stag, Richard's emblem "gorged" with a golden coronet around its throat and a golden chain, "lodged" (the heraldic term for sitting) on a grassy meadow with branches of Anne's rosemary, with a gold "sky". On the other is a coat of arms with arms associated with King Edward the Confessor impaled with the arms of the Kings of England. These arms were adopted by Richard in about 1395. The arms of Edward were a later invention, as coats of arms had not been invented in the eleventh century when he lived.

== Iconography and date ==
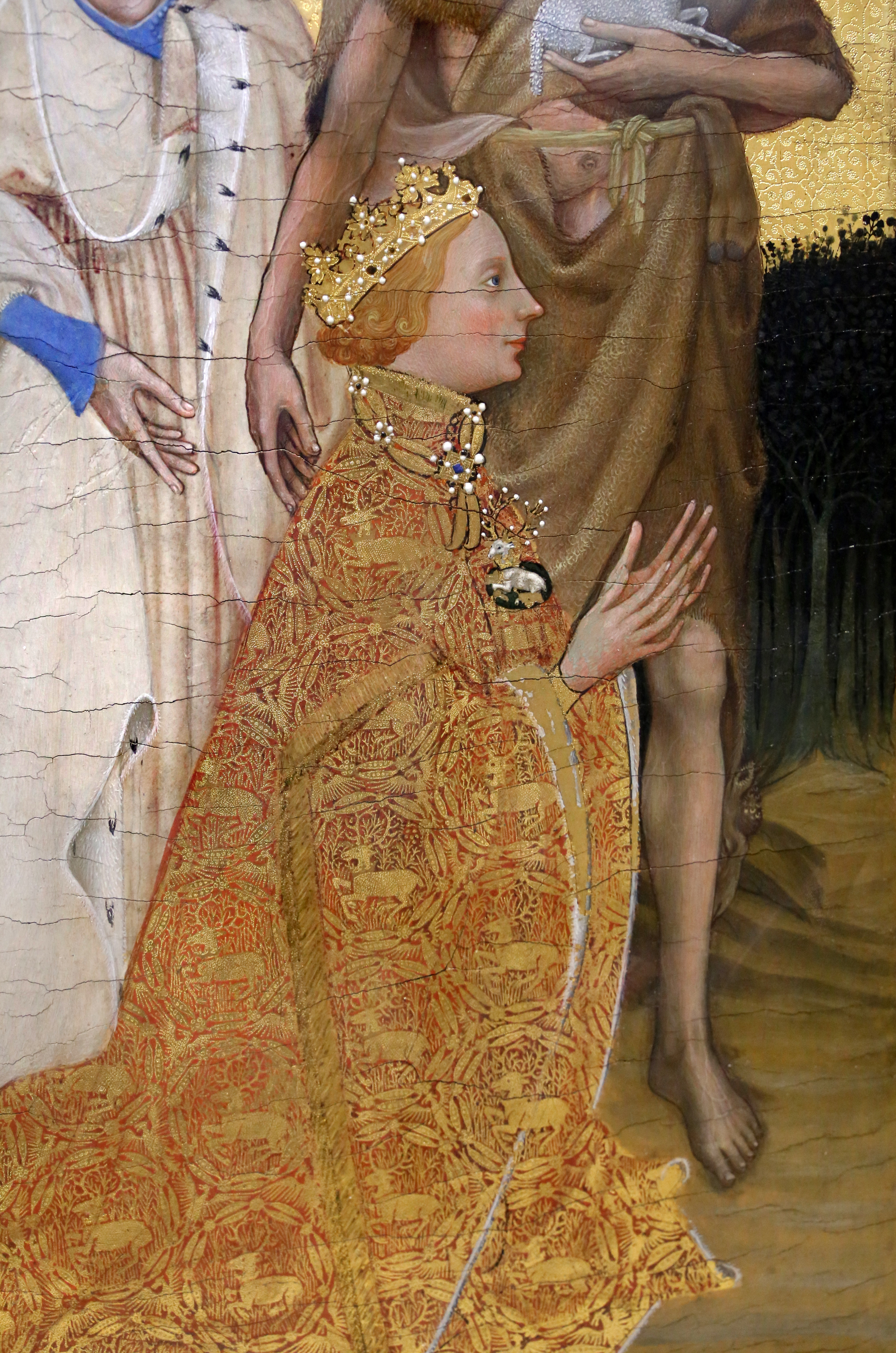
Detail of Richard II

The identity of the kneeling king is certain because he and the angels surrounding the Virgin are wearing badges with Richard's livery, the White Hart, which also appears in the brocade of the left panel and the outside of the diptych. As Richard kneels, the Christ Child reaches towards him in benediction and also reaches towards the pennant held by an angel, and significantly placed between them. This pennant is the symbol of Richard's kingship and of the Kingdom of England as a whole. It bears the Cross of St George, the symbol of England, and surmounting the staff is an orb on which is a scene featuring a turreted white castle on a green island, with a ship in sail in front of it: the island is believed to represent England or Ireland, where Richard was campaigning in 1394–95. The probable sense is that the pennant has just been presented by Richard. The liveried angels, iconographically very unusual, are a strangely precise anticipation of the lines from Shakespeare's Richard II of two hundred years later:

The breath of worldly men cannot depose
The deputy elected by the Lord:
For every man that Bolingbroke hath press'd
To lift shrewd steel against our golden crown,
God for his Richard hath in heavenly pay
A glorious angel: then, if angels fight,
Weak men must fall, for heaven still guards the right. (Act III Scene 2)

It is possible that Shakespeare had seen the picture, then still in the Royal Collection.

Apparently beginning relatively harmlessly in the reign of Richard's grandfather Edward III in a context of tournaments and courtly celebrations, by Richard's reign livery badges had come to be seen as a social menace, and were "one of the most protracted controversies of Richard's reign", as they were used to denote the small private armies of retainers kept by lords, largely for the purpose of enforcing their lord's will on the less powerful in his area. Though they were surely a symptom rather than a cause of both local baronial bullying and the disputes between the king and his uncles and other lords, Parliament repeatedly tried to curb the use of livery badges.

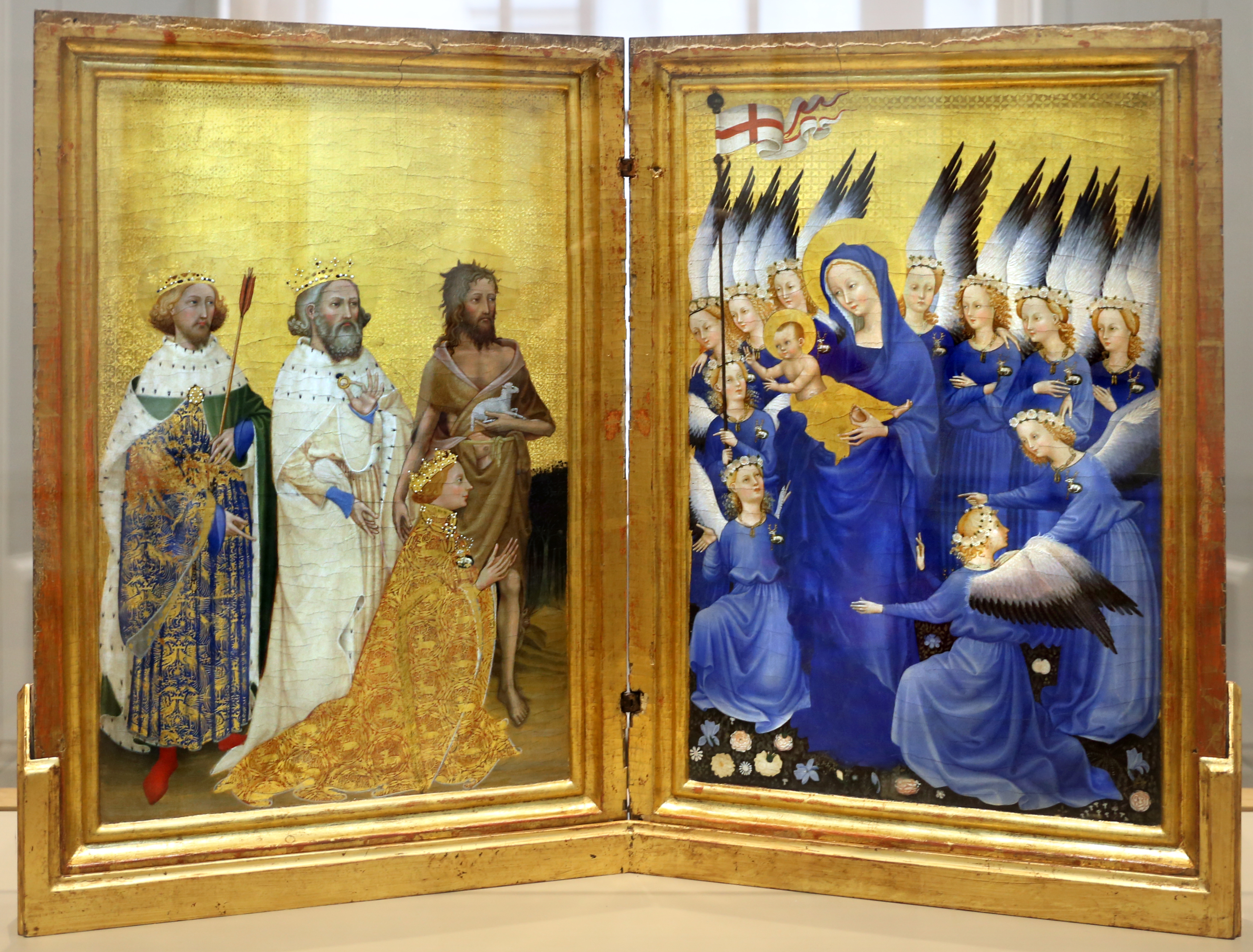
The diptych panels in their golden frame at the National Gallery

The issuing of badges by lords was attacked in the Parliament of 1384, and in 1388 they made the startling request that "all liveries called badges [signes], as well of our lord the king as of other lords ... shall be abolished", because "those who wear them are flown with such insolent arrogance that they do not shrink from practising with reckless effrontery various kinds of extortion in the surrounding countryside ... and it is certainly the boldness inspired by these badges that makes them unafraid to do these things". Richard offered to give up his own badges, to the delight of the House of Commons of England, but the House of Lords refused to give up theirs, and the matter was put off. In 1390 it was ordered that no one below the rank of banneret should issue badges, and no one below the rank of esquire wear them.

The issue was apparently quiet for a few years, but from 1397 Richard issued increasingly large numbers of badges to retainers who misbehaved (his "Cheshire archers" being especially notorious), and in the Parliament of 1399, after his deposition, several of his leading supporters were forbidden from issuing "badges of signes" again, and a statute was passed allowing only the king (now Henry IV) to issue badges, and only to those ranking as esquires and above, who were only to wear them in his presence. In the end it took a determined campaign by Henry VII to largely stamp out the use of livery badges by others than the king, and reduce them to things normally worn only by household servants.

All three saints who present the kneeling Richard to the Virgin and Child are believed to have been venerated by the king, as each has his own chapel in Westminster Abbey. Each saint holds the symbolic attribute by which they are recognised in art. Edmund the Martyr, who stands to the left, holds the arrow which killed him in 869, while Edward the Confessor, at the centre, holds the ring he gave to a pilgrim who transpired to be the disguised John the Evangelist. John the Baptist (right) holds his symbol, the Lamb of God.

The scene makes reference to King Richard's birth on 6 January, the feast of Epiphany, when Christ was adored by three kings, often depicted in similar compositions to this. At this date the feast of the Baptism of Christ by John the Baptist was celebrated on the same day and the figure of John in his usual hermit's dress, carrying a lamb, recalls the shepherds, whose visit after the birth of Christ was often combined in the same scene as the visit of the Magi or three kings. That two of the presenting saints are kings may also evoke a contemporary story that Richard's birth in Bordeaux in France was attended by the Kings of Castile, Navarre, and Portugal. John the Baptist was Richard's patron saint, and Saint Edward and Saint Edmund had both been English kings. Richard had a special devotion to Edmund, who with St George is one of the patron saints of England.

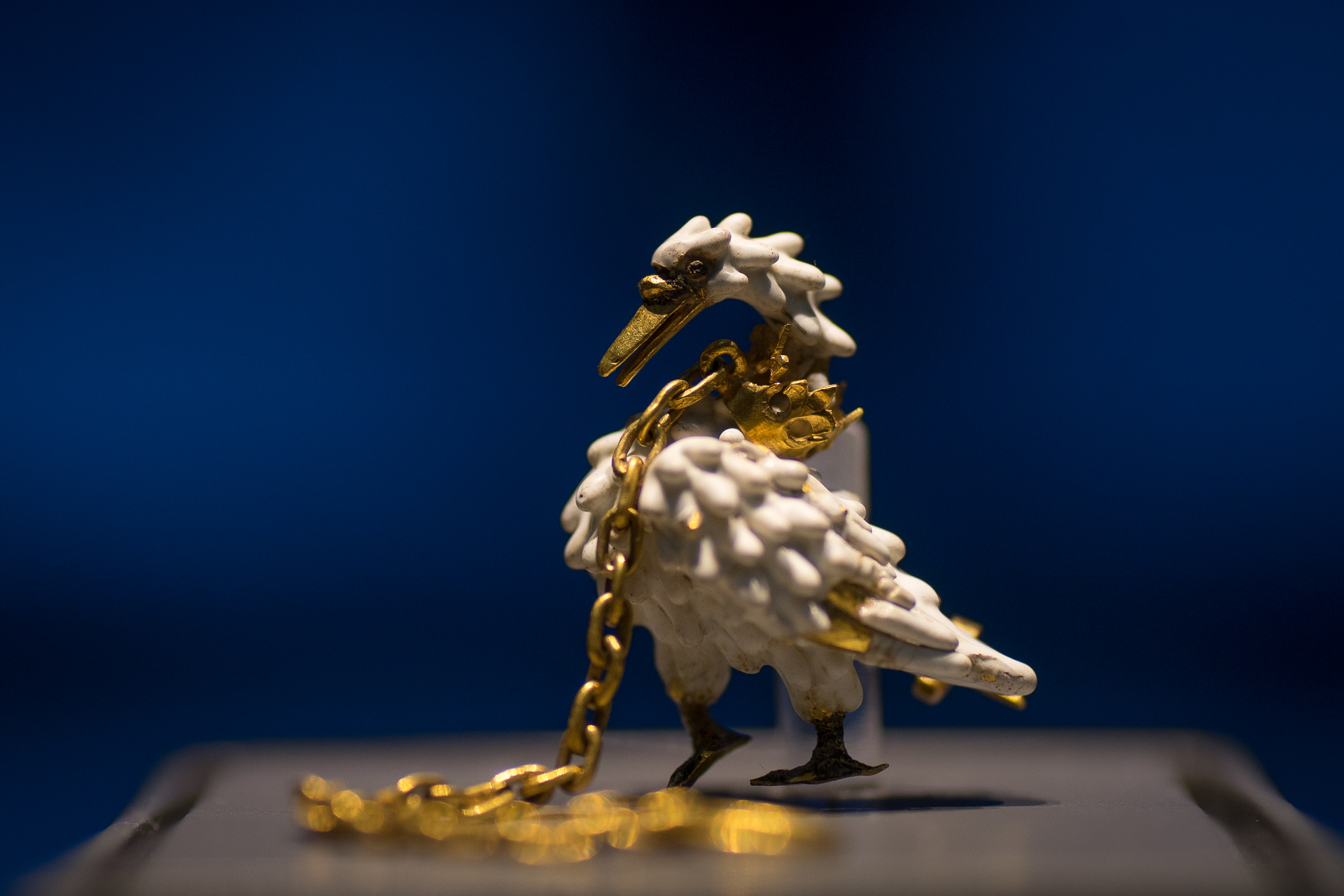
The Dunstable Swan Jewel, a livery badge in ronde bosse enamel, about 1400. British Museum

The diptych also serves as a family portrait of Richard's family and immediate antecedents. There is a strong resemblance between the three saints, and it has been suggested they represent not just Saints Edmund, Edward the Confessor, and John the Baptist, but also either Edward III (Richard's immediate predecessor) with his sons Edward the Black Prince (Richard's father) and John of Gaunt (Richard's uncle, and a powerful figure during Richard's youth); or, alternatively, the Black Prince doubled with the Baptist (the Black Prince, like John the Baptist, was never a king, and the Baptist takes the most paternal role in the scene), Edward III doubled with the Confessor, and Edward III's father Edward II doubled with Edmund the Martyr (like Edmund, Edward II was a murdered king; Richard revered Edward, and tried to have him canonised in 1395). The Virgin Mary is considered to represent Richard's mother, Joan of Kent, and the infant Jesus to be Edward of Angoulême, Richard's older brother who died in childhood.

The date of the Wilton Diptych has been the subject of considerable controversy among art historians. The National Gallery follow a broad current consensus in dating the painting to the last five years of Richard's reign, but dates between 1377 and about 1413 have been proposed. Richard was born in 1367, and the portrait seems to be of a younger man than the twenty-eight-year-old he was in 1395. It has been suggested that the eleven angels each represent a year of his age at the start of his actual reign, which began in 1377, when he gave eleven of the coins called angels to "Our Lady of the Pew" at Westminster Abbey. The painting would then have been made more than fifteen years later to commemorate the moment. Alternatively the painting might represent Richard's reception into heaven after his death in 1400, though given the circumstances of his deposition, who would have commissioned such a work in the next reign is unclear.

The number of angels (eleven) is unusual and has still not been satisfactorily explained. It is in contradiction with the iconography of the heavenly court of the Virgin, because in medieval iconography the number eleven has extremely negative symbolism. Considering the Biblical exegesis and medieval number symbolism, a possible interpretation of the enigmatic number of angels can be found in the Biblical motif of the second dream of young Joseph (Genesis 37:9) in which the number eleven exceptionally has a positive meaning because it implicates the celestial twelve. The sun, the moon and eleven stars that in Joseph's dream are bowing down to him are completed by Joseph himself, who according to medieval exegesis is to be taken for a twelfth star. Having in mind the historical evidence of Richard II's personal regal iconography of the anointed king and the documented Biblical allusions, it seems that the motif of youthful Joseph honoured in his dream by the sun, representing the Christ, the moon, representing the Virgin and eleven stars representing his brothers offers a significant parallel to the vision of the heavenly court with Jesus Christ, the Virgin and eleven angelic courtiers appearing in front of the eyes of King Richard II.

The painting is indicative of both Richard's belief in his divine right to rule and his genuine Christian devotion. It also importantly symbolises (in the form of the Pennant), Richard II giving his kingdom into the hands of the Holy Virgin, thereby continuing a long tradition by which England was known as "Our Lady's Dowry" and was thought to be specially under her protection. Another painting, now lost, showed Richard and Anne offering the Virgin an orb representing England, with the inscription "This is your dowry, O Holy Virgin, wherefore, O Mary, may you rule over it".

== Authorship ==
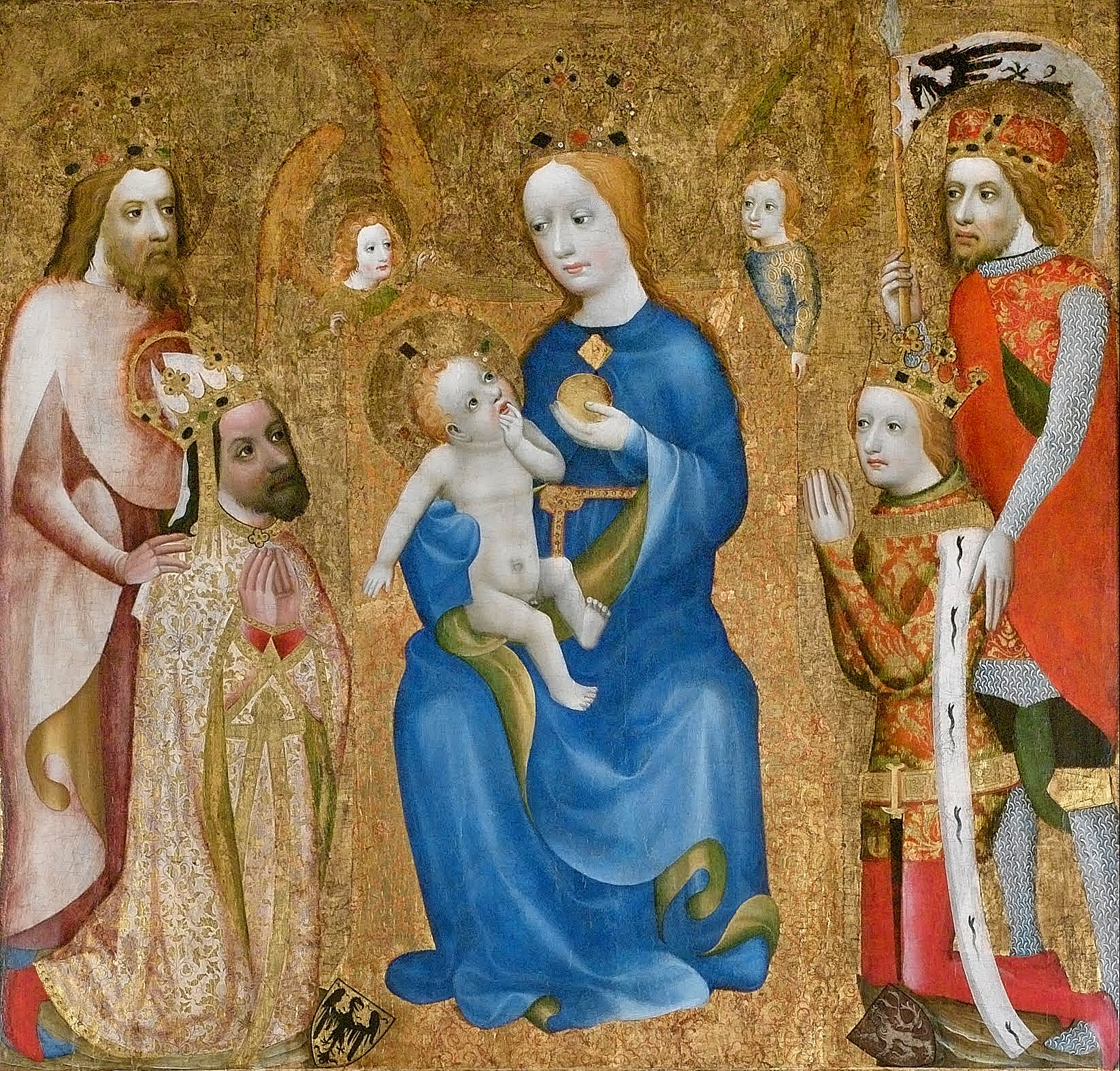
Richard's father-in-law Emperor Charles IV and brother-in-law presented to the Virgin by royal saints, Bohemia c. 1370 (detail from the Votive Panel of Archbishop Jan Očko of Vlašim)

The artist, sometimes referred to as the "Wilton Master", has never been identified, or associated with other panel paintings, and the closest resemblances to his style come in some illuminated manuscripts from the 1410s. At this period it was common in Northern Europe for panel paintings, still made in very small numbers, to be made by artists with a background in illumination. The date of the painting, at a time when the International Gothic style was at its most similar in several courts in Europe, makes identifying the nationality of its painter more difficult. It is possible that the painter was English, but apart from the Westminster portrait of Richard, now unlike the Diptych much overpainted, there are too few comparable works to establish in what style the recorded English painters worked.

The artist has been proposed as coming from "every possible nation", but France seems the most likely, with Italy another possibility, and some art historians point to the possibility of a Bohemian artist, perhaps brought to England by Richard II's first wife, Anne of Bohemia. The exquisite quality of the painting is thought by most art historians to indicate that the artist was probably from northern France. It shows similarities to the manuscript painting of Pol de Limbourg, but like the other surviving portrait of Richard, in Westminster Abbey, is also closely related in themes to paintings made in Prague for Anne's father Charles IV, Holy Roman Emperor and her brother Wenceslas, King of the Romans.

== Provenance ==
The painting was drawn and issued as a print by Wenceslaus Hollar in 1639, with a dedication to King Charles I. It was documented in 1649 in an inventory of the art collection of King Charles I who had been given it by Sir James Palmer, a Gentleman Usher of the Privy Chamber. It passed to the Earls of Pembroke who kept it at Wilton House, from which it takes its name, until it was bought by the National Gallery in 1929. That it remained intact is remarkable because little religious pictorial art survived the Puritan iconoclasm that followed the execution of Charles I.
