= Livery collar =

Heavy chain worn as insignia of office or mark of fealty

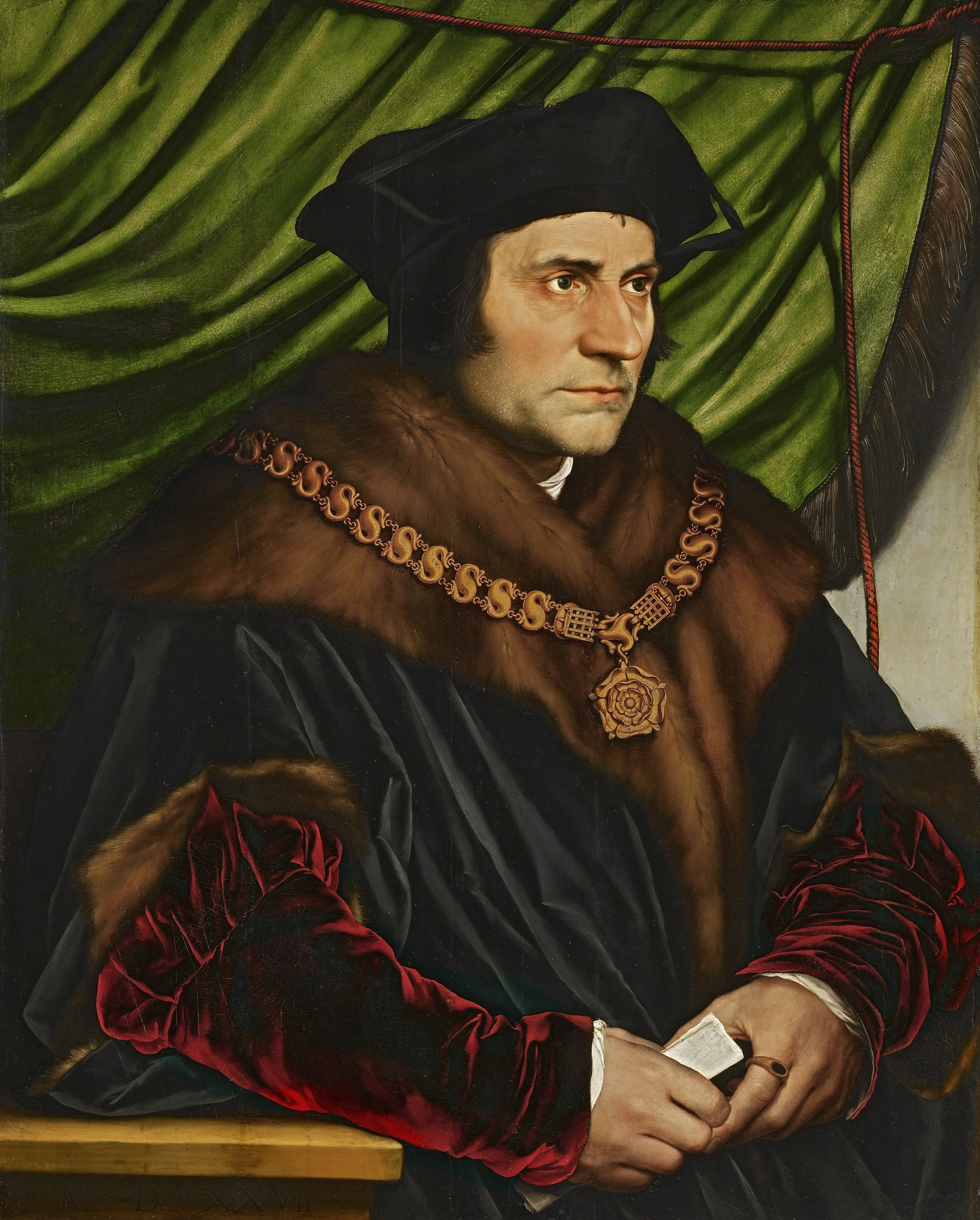
Sir Thomas More wearing the Collar of Esses, with the Tudor rose badge of Henry VIII, by Hans Holbein the Younger (1527)

A livery collar or chain of office is a collar or heavy chain, usually of gold, worn as insignia of office or a mark of fealty or other association in Europe from the Middle Ages onwards.

One of the oldest and best-known livery collars is the Collar of Esses, which has been in continuous use in England since the 14th century.

== History ==
=== Origins ===
Various forms of livery were used in the Middle Ages to denote attachment to a great person by friends, servants, and political supporters. The collar, usually of precious metal, was the grandest form of these, usually given by the person the livery denoted to his closest or most important associates, but should not, in the early period, be seen as separate from the wider phenomenon of livery badges, clothes and other forms. From the collar hung a badge or device indicating the person the livery related to; the most important part of the ensemble for contemporaries. Equally gold collars that had no livery connotations were worn.

Livery collars seem to be first recorded in the 14th century. Charles V of France in 1378 granted to his Chamberlain Geoffrey de Belleville the right of bearing in all feasts and in all companies the collar of the Cosse de Geneste or Broomcod, a collar which was accepted and worn even by the English kings, Charles VI sending such collars to Richard II and to his three uncles. Although he distributed "genet" badges much more widely, only about twenty collars per year were given out, and it was treated somewhat as the sign of a pseudo-chivalric order, although no such order formally existed. The collar of Esses is first recorded earlier than this, as being given by John of Gaunt, and remained in use by the House of Lancaster throughout the Wars of the Roses.

This French type of collar, a chain of couples of broomcods linked by jewels, is seen in the contemporary Wilton Diptych portrait of Richard II, with Richard's own device of the white hart hanging below (the angels accompanying the Virgin also wear Richard's livery badges). The same collar was worn by Henry IV on the way to his crowning. During the sitting of the Parliament of England in 1394 the complaints of Richard FitzAlan, 11th Earl of Arundel against Richard II are recorded, one of his grievances being that the king had been wearing the livery collar of his uncle John of Gaunt, Duke of Lancaster, and that people of the king's following wore the same livery. To which the king answered that soon after the return from Spain (in 1389) of his uncle, the duke, he himself took the collar from his uncle's neck, putting it on his own, which collar the king would wear and use for a sign of the good and whole-hearted love between them, even as he wore the liveries of his other uncles. Livery collars of the king of France, of Queen Anne and of the dukes of York and Lancaster are recorded among the royal plate and jewels which in the first year of Henry IV had come to the king's hands. The inventory shows that Queen Anne's collar was made up of sprigs of rosemary garnished with pearls. The York collar had falcons and fetterlocks, and the Lancaster collar was doubtless that Collar of Esses used by the duke's son, Henry of Bolingbroke (Henry IV), as an earl, duke and king.

== Collar of Esses ==
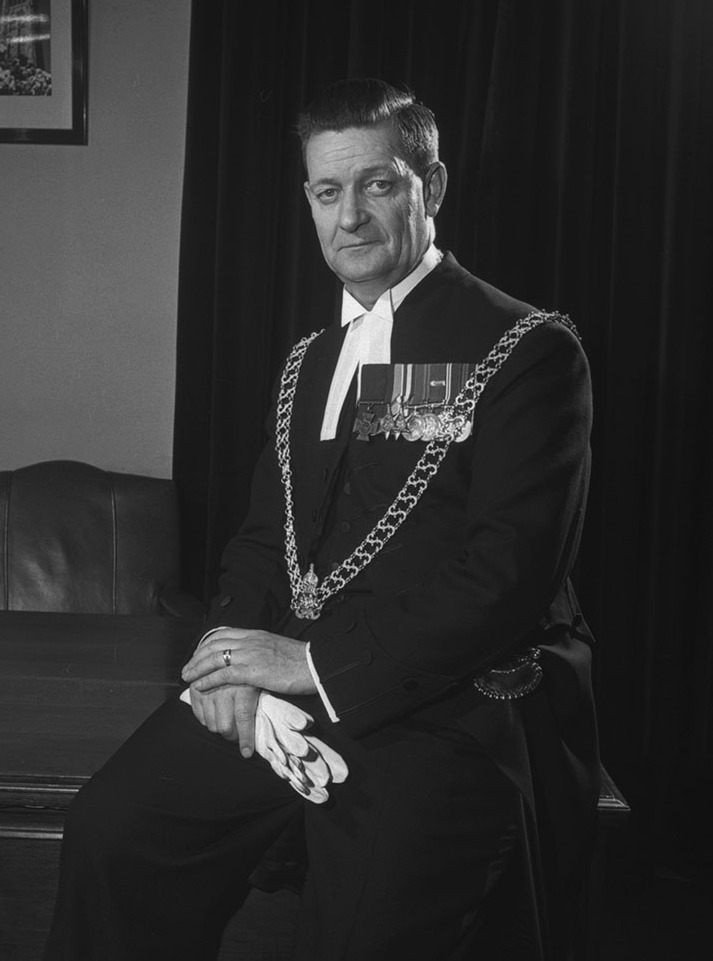
Lt-Col. David Currie VC wearing a collar of esses in his role as Sergeant at Arms of the Canadian House of Commons

This famous livery collar, which has never passed out of use, takes many forms, its Esses being sometimes linked together chainwise, and sometimes, in early examples, as the ornamental bosses of a garter-shaped strap-collar. The oldest effigy bearing it is that in Spratton church of Sir John Swynford, who died in 1371. Swynford was a follower of John of Gaunt, and the date of his death easily disposes of the theory that the Esses were devised by Henry IV to stand for his motto or "word" of Soverayne. Many explanations are given of the origin of these letters, but none has as yet been established: for example: Souvent me souvien or "Think of me often." During the reigns of Henry IV, his son (Henry V) and grandson (Henry VI), the collar of Esses was a royal badge of the Lancastrian house and party, the white swan, as in the Dunstable Swan Jewel, usually being its pendant.

In one of Henry VI's own collars the S was joined to the broomcod of the French device, symbolizing the king's claim to the two kingdoms. The kings of the house of York and their chief followers wore the Yorkist collar of suns and roses, with the white lion of March, the Clare bull, or Richard's white boar for a pendant device. Henry VIII brought back the collar of Esses, a portcullis or a Tudor rose hanging from it, although in a portrait of him, in the Society of Antiquaries, he wears the rose en soleil alternating with knots, and his son (later Edward VI) had a collar of red and white roses. It was presented to ministers and courtiers, and came to represent more a symbol of office by the time of Elizabeth I.

In modern times the Collar of Esses is worn, on state occasions only, by the Kings and Heralds of Arms, by the Lord Chief Justice and by Serjeants-at-Arms.

The term "Collar of SS" was preferred by Victorian antiquaries.

== Private livery collars ==
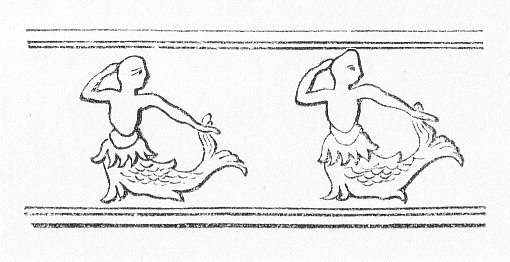
Drawing of detail of mermaid collar of Thomas de Berkeley, 5th Baron Berkeley (d. 1417), from his monumental brass at Wotton-under-Edge, Gloucestershire

Besides these royal collars, the 14th and 15th centuries show many private devices. A monumental brass at Mildenhall shows a knight whose badge of a dog or wolf circled by a crown hangs from a collar with edges suggesting a pruned bough or the ragged staff. Thomas of Markenfield (d. c. 1415) on his brass at Ripon has a strange collar of park palings with a badge of a hart in a park, and Thomas de Berkeley, 5th Baron Berkeley (d. 1417) wears one set with mermaids, the Berkeley family heraldic badge.

== Renaissance chains ==
In the Renaissance, gold chains tended to replace collars, and portrait miniature of the donor tended to replace the earlier badges with symbolic devices, although "picture boxes" containing miniatures could be highly extravagant pieces of jewellery. The Elizabethan artist Nicholas Hilliard was both a goldsmith and miniaturist, and so produced the whole of pieces like the Armada Jewel, given by Elizabeth I of England to a courtier. When the Earl of Rutland returned from an embassy to Denmark, sixteen members of his party were given chains of gold with the James I of England's picture, and others received just a picture. During the sixteenth century collars became marks of a specific office or Order, and subsequently remained so.

=== Mayoral collars ===
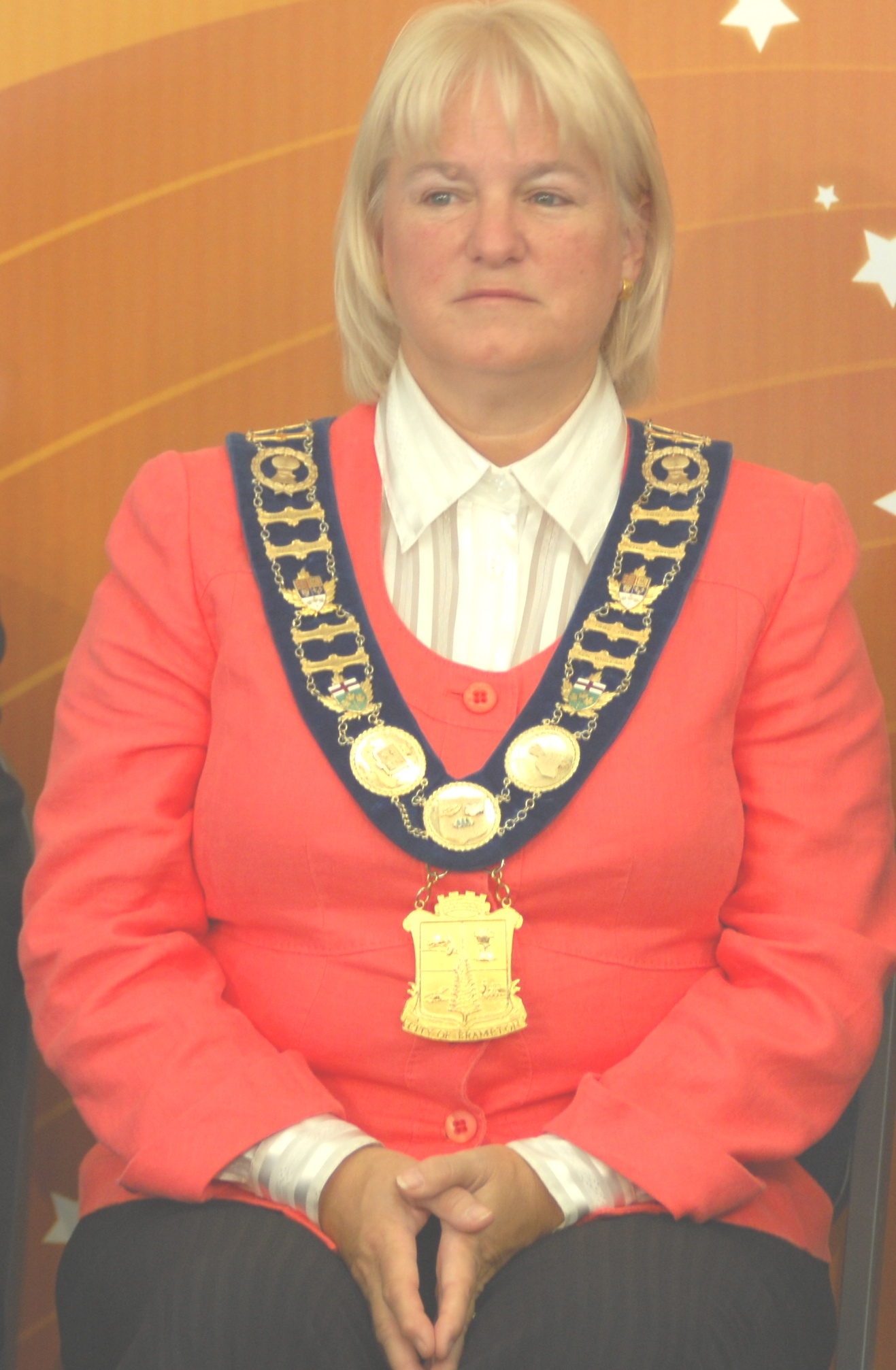
Susan Fennell, mayor of Brampton, Ontario, Canada from 2000 to 2014, pictured wearing a modern mayoral collar

Most English, Welsh and Irish mayors, and Scottish provosts, wear a collar/chain of office, and new ones are still designed for new municipalities. The mayor's or provost's spouse may have a much smaller version. These are worn over normal clothes when on official duties. Following British practice, most Canadian, Australian and New Zealand mayors also wear chains of office. The custom also spread outside the Commonwealth, to Germany (originally only Prussia) in 1808, to the Netherlands by royal decree in 1852 and to Norway after the mayor of Oslo received one as a gift in 1950, and most Norwegian mayors now have mayoral chains.

The design of modern mayoral chains mimics the ancient gold collar of Esses worn by the Lord Mayor of London which was bequeathed to his successors by Sir John Aleyn (who died in 1545) and which has a large jewelled pendant added in 1607.

=== Collars of orders of knighthood ===
Collars of various devices are worn by the knights of some of the European orders of knighthood. The custom was begun by Philip III, Duke of Burgundy, who gave his knights of the Golden Fleece badges of a golden fleece hung from a collar of flints, steels and sparks. Following this new fashion, Louis XI of France, when instituting his order of St. Michael in 1469, gave the knights collars of scallop shells linked on a chain.

The chain was doubled by Charles VIII, and the pattern suffered other changes before the order lapsed in 1830.

At the end of the 18th century, most of the European orders had only one rank—that of knight—and although they usually had collars the cross or badge was now worn on a ribbon around the neck or over the right shoulder. When the orders became more democratic, several ranks were introduced and only the highest grade, the Grand Commanders or Grand Crosses, wore collars. The Netherlands never had collars, but several Belgian, most of the Austrian and Prussian orders and several Portuguese orders had collars. In Portugal, all the members of these orders of knighthood wore collars, but the collars of the Grand Crosses were more elaborate.

In England, until the reign of Henry VIII, the Order of the Garter, most ancient of the great knightly orders, had no collar. But the Tudor king must needs match in all things with continental sovereigns, and the present collar of the Garter knights, with its golden knots and its buckled garters enclosing white roses set on red roses, has its origin in the Tudor age.

Knights of most of the British orders have collars that are worn on special occasions, but not the Knights Bachelor or holders of decorations such as the Distinguished Service Order, the Order of Merit, the Order of the Companions of Honour and the Imperial Service Order. The Royal Victorian Chain is a collar and there are no other insignia.

In France, Emperor Napoleon I introduced the "Grand aigle" collar as the highest rank in his Légion d'honneur. It did not survive his downfall, save for that worn by the head of state of France as Grand Master.

Sometimes, the collar is the insignia of office of the Grand Master of the order; the French president, therefore, wears the collar of the Order of the Légion d'honneur. In other countries, such as Brazil, the collar is a rank above that of a Grand Cross and it is reserved for the president and foreign heads of state.

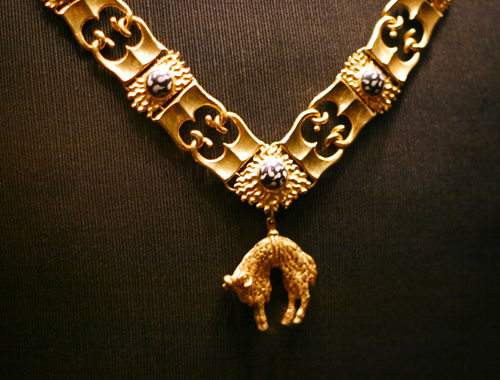
Collar of the Order of the Golden Fleece, shown in the Schatzkammer in Vienna, Austria

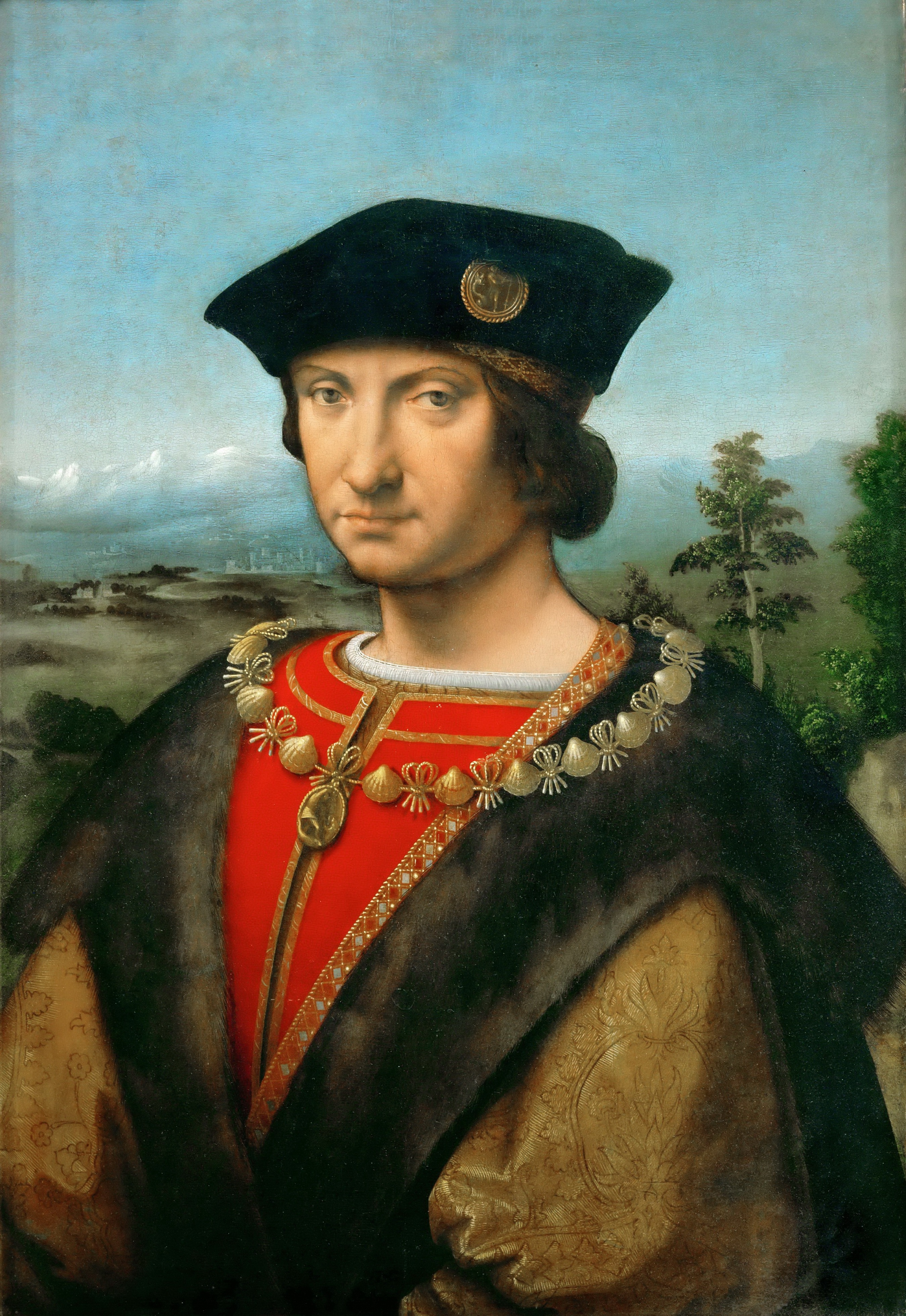
Charles d'Amboise in the cockleshell collar of the Order of Saint Michael, 1507

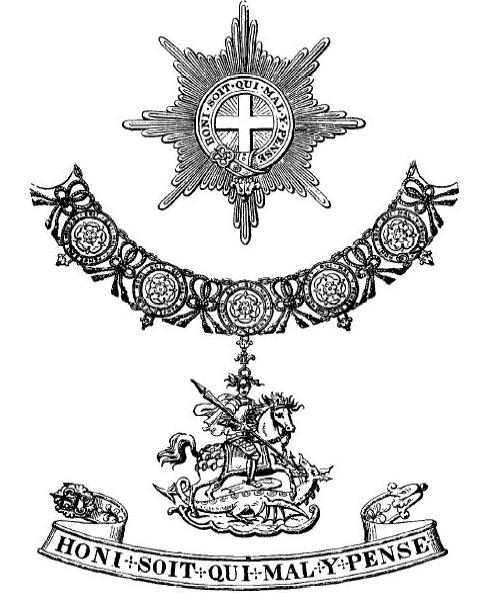
The insignia of a knight of the Order of the Garter

=== Collars of Freemasonry ===
Collars also have a long history within Freemasonry. Collars are often worn by officers of high rank. Nearly all Grand Lodge officers wear collars as an emblem of their office. In history, many such collars are quite valuable, featuring gold and precious jewels.

Collars vary widely among Masonic Grand Lodges. While those Lodges working under the Grand Lodge of England have fairly uniform designs, Grand Lodges in the United States vary widely, employing collars made from metal chains backed by velvet, to those made of velvet and embroidered with gold and silver bullion thread.

Today, English lodge officers wear a fabric collar with a simple jewel of their office pendant to it. Each jewel represents a skill or virtue which he possesses and instructs the brothers of Masonry in. In some jurisdictions, these jewels are silver-plated for the Craft or Blue Lodges under 100 years old, or gold-plated for lodges older than 100 years. The collars generally sit on the wearer's shoulders and fall over the chest, ending in a point between the breasts.

== See also ==
- Collar (order)
- Heraldic badge
- Livery
- Necklet
- Orders of chivalry
- Presidential sash

== General and cited references ==
- Purey-Cust, Arthur Percival. (1910). The Collar SS: A History and a Conjecture. Leeds, Richard Jackson. OCLC 7504736
- Strong, Roy. (1975). Nicholas Hilliard London: Michael Joseph. ISBN 978-0-718-11301-8; OCLC 1622631

Attribution:
