= Cheshire archers =

The Cheshire archers were a body of elite soldiers noted for their skills with the longbow that fought in many engagements in England and France in the Middle Ages. Battles at which there were sizeable numbers of Cheshire archers include Crecy and Agincourt.

Richard II employed a bodyguard of these yeoman archers who came from the Macclesfield Hundred and the Royal forest of Macclesfield as well as the other forest districts of Cheshire such as Mara and Mondrem, alongside Men-at-Arms from the same areas.
