= Derbyshire Dales District Council elections =

Local government elections in Derbyshire, England

Map showing the composition of Derbyshire Dales District Council as of May 2023. Striped wards have mixed representation.

Derbyshire Dales District Council elections are held every four years. Derbyshire Dales District Council is the local authority for the non-metropolitan district of Derbyshire Dales in Derbyshire, England. Before 1987, the district was called West Derbyshire. Since the last boundary changes in 2023, 34 councillors have been elected from 21 wards.

== Council elections ==
Below is a summary of the council election results since 1991.

Year	Conservative	Liberal Democrats	Labour	Green	Independent	Notes
1991	24	9	3	0	3	New ward boundaries. District boundaries changed slightly.
1995	15	16	8	0	0	
1999	21	9	5	0	4	
2003	24	9	5	0	1	New ward boundaries.
2007	26	8	4	0	1	
2011	29	4	5	0	1	
2015	29	3	5	0	2	
2019	20	8	6	2	3	
2023	11	12	6	4	1	New ward boundaries. Number of councillors reduced from 39 to 34.

== District result maps ==
2003 results map

2007 results map

2011 results map

2015 results map

2019 results map

2023 results map

== By-election results ==
By-elections occur when seats become vacant between council elections. Below is an incomplete summary of recent by-elections.

By-election	Date	Incumbent party	Winning party
St Giles and Tansley	1 May 1997	Liberal Democrats	Liberal Democrats
Calver by-election	12 October 2000	Conservative	Conservative
Taddington by-election	7 March 2002	Conservative	Conservative
All Saints Matlock by-election	27 November 2003	Liberal Democrats	Liberal Democrats
Litton and Longstone by-election	31 March 2005	Conservative	Conservative
Winster & South Darley by-election	20 April 2006	Liberal Democrats	Conservative
Lathkill & Bradford by-election	11 May 2006	Independent	Independent
Masson by-election	6 December 2007	Labour	Conservative
Matlock St Giles by-election	4 June 2009	Liberal Democrats	Liberal Democrats
Winster & South Darley by-election	23 July 2009	Conservative	Labour
Bradwell by-election	12 January 2012	Conservative	Conservative
Ashbourne South by-election	26 October 2017	Conservative	Conservative
Masson by-election	6 May 2021	Labour	Conservative
Wirksworth by-election	6 May 2021	Labour	Labour
Carsington Water by-election	5 May 2022	Conservative	Conservative
Bakewell by-election	22 February 2024	Conservative	Labour
Norbury by-election	22 February 2024	Conservative	Conservative
Calver & Longstone by-election	14 November 2024	Green	Conservative
