= 2019 Derbyshire Dales District Council election =

2019 UK local government election

← 2015	2 May 2019	2023 →

All 39 seats to Derbyshire Dales District Council 20 seats needed for a majority
	First party	Second party	Third party
Party	Conservative	Liberal Democrats	Labour
Last election	29 seats, 45.3%	3 seats, 7.2%	5 seats, 26.9%
Seats won	20	8	6
Seat change	▼9	▲5	▲1
Popular vote	17,017	9,991	11,112
Percentage	40.1%	23.6%	26.2%
Swing	▼5.3%	▲16.4%	▼0.7%
	Fourth party	Fifth party
Party	Independent	Green
Last election	2 seats, 6.2%	0 seats, 5.8%
Seats won	3	2
Seat change	▲1	▲2
Popular vote	1,561	2,239
Percentage	3.7%	5.3%
Swing	▼2.5%	▼0.5%
- Map showing the composition of Derbyshire Dales District Council following the election. Striped wards have mixed representation.
Council control before election
Conservative
Council control after election
Conservative

The 2019 Derbyshire Dales District Council election was held on 2 May 2019 to elect all 39 councillors for Derbyshire Dales District Council. This was on the same day as other local elections.

The Conservative Party retained control of the council for the fifth consecutive election, with a significantly reduced majority of 1.

No wards were uncontested for the first time since the 1999 election, and was the last election to be held under the ward boundaries that had been in use since the 2003 election.

== Ward results ==
=== Ashbourne North ===
Ashbourne North
Party	Candidate	Votes	%	±%
Conservative	Sue Bull	519	48.5	
Conservative	Stuart Lees	515	48.1	
Liberal Democrats	Peter Dobbs	325	30.3	
Liberal Democrats	Patricia Wildgoose	263	24.6	
Labour	Andy White	198	18.5	
Labour	Roslyn Hope	187	17.5	
Majority		190		
Turnout		1,071		
Conservative hold		Swing	▼20.9	
Conservative hold		Swing		

=== Ashbourne South ===
Ashbourne South
Party	Candidate	Votes	%	±%
Conservative	Tom Donnelly	598	43.3	
Liberal Democrats	Robert Archer	538	39.0	
Conservative	Dermot Murphy	516	37.4	
Liberal Democrats	Robin Shirtcliffe	447	32.4	
Labour	Peter Ginnis	161	11.7	
Labour	Ruth Pugh	160	11.6	
Green	John Hill	157	11.4	
Majority		22		
Turnout		1,380		
Conservative hold		Swing	▼24.4	
Liberal Democrats gain from Conservative		Swing		

=== Bakewell ===
Bakewell
Party	Candidate	Votes	%	±%
Conservative	Mark Wakeman	1,025	67.0	
Conservative	Alyson Hill	1,015	66.4	
Conservative	Alasdair Sutton	939	61.4	
Labour	Paul Morgans	465	30.4	
Labour	Helen Smith	408	26.7	
Majority		474		
Turnout		1,529		
Conservative hold		Swing	▲14.0	
Conservative hold		Swing		
Conservative hold		Swing		

=== Bradwell ===
Bradwell
Party	Candidate	Votes	%	±%
Conservative	Chris Furness	324	57.4	▼9.6
Labour	Les Swain	240	42.6	▲9.6
Majority		84		
Turnout		564		
Conservative hold		Swing	▼9.6	

=== Brailsford ===
Brailsford
Party	Candidate	Votes	%	±%
Conservative	Michele Morley	542	82.6	
Labour	Nicholas Bishop	114	17.4	
Majority		428		
Turnout		656		
Conservative hold		Swing	▼23.9	

=== Calver ===
Calver
Party	Candidate	Votes	%	±%
Conservative	Helen Froggatt	329	48.5	▼15.6
Green	Robert Scott	219	32.2	▲32.2
Labour	Thomas Barker	131	19.3	▼16.6
Majority		110		
Turnout		679		
Conservative hold		Swing	▼23.9	

=== Carsington Water ===
Carsington Water
Party	Candidate	Votes	%	±%
Conservative	Lewis Rose	374	59.6	
Liberal Democrats	Margaret Elsworth	132	21.0	
Labour	Bob Allen	122	19.4	
Majority		155		
Turnout		628		
Conservative hold		Swing		

=== Chatsworth ===
Chatsworth
Party	Candidate	Votes	%	±%
Conservative	Susan Hobson	456	74.0	
Liberal Democrats	Barbara Bowman	100	16.2	
Labour	Jacob Butler	60	9.7	
Majority		356		
Turnout		616		
Conservative hold		Swing		

=== Clifton and Bradley ===
Clifton and Bradley
Party	Candidate	Votes	%	±%
Conservative	Andrew Shirley	396	64.7	▲4.3
Labour	Rob Pugh	114	18.6	▲18.6
UKIP	Richard Stone	102	16.7	▲1.8
Majority		282		
Turnout		612		
Conservative hold		Swing	▼7.2	

=== Darley Dale ===
Darley Dale
Party	Candidate	Votes	%	±%
Conservative	Jason Atkin	755	43.5	
Conservative	Mark Salt	685	39.5	
Conservative	Andrew Statham	653	37.6	
Liberal Democrats	Naomi Bell	431	24.8	
Liberal Democrats	Andrew Creese	374	21.6	
Green	Emma Hickling	363	20.9	
Labour	Robert Golder	324	18.7	
Labour	Lucy Peacock	301	17.3	
UKIP	Paul Roe	267	15.4	
Labour	Keith Kendrick	246	14.2	
Liberal Democrats	Stephen Martin	241	13.9	
Majority		222		
Turnout		1,735		
Conservative hold		Swing	▼7.0	
Conservative hold		Swing		
Conservative hold		Swing		

=== Dovedale and Parwich ===
Dovedale and Parwich
Party	Candidate	Votes	%	±%
Conservative	Richard FitzHerbert	424	73.7	
Liberal Democrats	Sandra Fearn	78	13.6	
Labour	Sue Hodgson	73	12.7	
Majority		346		
Turnout		575		
Conservative hold		Swing		

=== Doveridge and Sudbury ===
Doveridge and Sudbury
Party	Candidate	Votes	%	±%
Independent	Jacqueline Allison	343	53.8	▲53.8
Conservative	Albert Catt	238	37.3	▼37.7
Labour	Laurie Butler	57	8.9	▲8.9
Majority		105		
Turnout		638		
Independent gain from Conservative		Swing	▲45.8	

=== Hartington and Taddington ===
Hartington and Taddington
Party	Candidate	Votes	%	±%
Conservative	David Chapman	289	59.8	
Green	John Youatt	82	17.0	
Liberal Democrats	Asher Bond	61	12.6	
Labour	John Cowings	51	10.6	
Majority		207		
Turnout		483		
Conservative hold		Swing		

=== Hathersage and Eyam ===
Hathersage and Eyam
Party	Candidate	Votes	%	±%
Labour	Peter O'Brien	585	41.3	
Labour	Claire Raw	552	38.9	
Conservative	Vicky Massey	548	38.6	
Conservative	John Orchard	479	33.8	
Liberal Democrats	Elanor Nancolas	420	29.6	
Majority		4		
Turnout		1,418		
Labour gain from Conservative		Swing	▲7.5	
Labour gain from Conservative		Swing		

=== Hulland ===
Hulland
Party	Candidate	Votes	%	±%
Conservative	Richard Bright	445	80.2	
Labour	Rosie Ayliffe	110	19.8	
Majority		335		
Turnout		555		
Conservative hold		Swing		

=== Lathkill and Bradford ===
Lathkill and Bradford
Party	Candidate	Votes	%	±%
Independent	Graham Elliott	460	86.0	▲23.7
Labour	Richard Wingard	75	14.0	▲14.0
Majority		385		
Turnout		535		
Independent hold		Swing	▲4.9	

=== Litton and Longstone ===
Litton and Longstone
Party	Candidate	Votes	%	±%
Liberal Democrats	Clare Gamble	296	48.5	
Conservative	Geoff Stevens	228	37.4	
Labour	Chris Cole	86	14.1	
Majority		68		
Turnout		610		
Liberal Democrats gain from Conservative		Swing		

=== Masson ===
Masson
Party	Candidate	Votes	%	±%
Labour	Joyce Pawley	459	44.6	
Conservative	Garry Purdy	386	37.5	
Labour	Andrew Hartley	334	32.5	
Green	John Green	273	26.5	
Conservative	Richard Walsh	261	25.4	
UKIP	Bob Spowart	156	15.2	
Majority		52		
Turnout		1,029		
Labour hold		Swing	▲10.0	
Conservative hold		Swing		

=== Matlock All Saints ===
Matlock All Saints
Party	Candidate	Votes	%	±%
Liberal Democrats	Susan Burfoot	1,465	68.7	
Liberal Democrats	Martin Burfoot	1,322	62.0	
Liberal Democrats	Steve Wain	1,182	55.5	
Conservative	Ann Elliott	549	25.8	
Labour	Martin Rutter	387	18.2	
Conservative	Elly Fawcett-Neal	339	15.9	
Labour	Lucia Whitney	339	15.9	
Majority		633		
Turnout		2,131		
Liberal Democrats hold		Swing	▲23.3	
Liberal Democrats hold		Swing		
Liberal Democrats gain from Conservative		Swing		

=== Matlock St. Giles ===
Matlock St. Giles
Party	Candidate	Votes	%	±%
Liberal Democrats	Steve Flitter	895	53.0	
Liberal Democrats	Paul Cruise	746	44.2	
Liberal Democrats	David Hughes	675	40.0	
Conservative	Jacquie Stevens	520	30.8	
Conservative	Dan Hopkinson	474	28.1	
Conservative	Alayne Green	415	24.6	
Labour	Sylvia Needham	359	21.3	
Labour	Peter Goulden	352	20.9	
Labour	Phil Whitney	318	18.8	
Majority		155		
Turnout		1,688		
Liberal Democrats hold		Swing	▲7.6	
Liberal Democrats gain from Labour		Swing		
Liberal Democrats gain from Conservative		Swing		

=== Norbury ===
Norbury
Party	Candidate	Votes	%	±%
Conservative	Tony Morley	435	82.9	▲6.1
Labour	Jan Cole	90	17.1	▲17.1
Majority		345		
Turnout		525		
Conservative hold		Swing	▼5.5	

=== Stanton ===
Stanton
Party	Candidate	Votes	%	±%
Green	Matthew Buckler	200	39.9	
Conservative	Dave Oakley	199	39.7	
Labour	Jennifer Joy-Matthews	102	20.4	
Majority		1		
Turnout		501		
Green gain from Conservative		Swing		

=== Tideswell ===
Tideswell
Party	Candidate	Votes	%	±%
Green	Neil Buttle	204	42.1	▲42.1
Conservative	Richard Hewson-Stoate	167	34.5	▼27.6
Labour	Chris Bowen	113	23.3	▼14.6
Majority		37		
Turnout		484		
Green gain from Conservative		Swing	▲34.9	

=== Winster and South Darley ===
Winster and South Darley
Party	Candidate	Votes	%	±%
Independent	Colin Swindell	758	97.2	
Labour	Charlie Phillips	22	2.8	
Majority		736		
Turnout		780		
Independent hold		Swing		

=== Wirksworth ===
Wirksworth
Party	Candidate	Votes	%	±%
Labour	Mike Ratcliffe	1,200	59.6	
Labour	Pete Slack	1,128	56.1	
Labour	Elisa McDonagh	1,089	54.1	
Green	Ivan Dixon	741	36.8	
Conservative	Gladwyn Gratton	590	29.3	
Conservative	Angus Jenkins	480	23.9	
Majority		348		
Turnout		2,012		
Labour hold		Swing	▲13.4	
Labour hold		Swing		
Labour hold		Swing		

== By-elections between 2019 and 2023 ==
=== Masson by-election ===
Masson by-election: 6 May 2021
Party	Candidate	Votes	%	±%
Conservative	Dermot Murphy	447	41.3	▲6.7
Labour	Nicholas Whitehead	444	41.0	▼1.3
Green	Mark Stanley	192	17.7	▲3.1
Majority		3		
Turnout		1,083		
Conservative gain from Labour		Swing	▲4.0	

=== Wirksworth by-election ===
Wirksworth by-election: 6 May 2021
Party	Candidate	Votes	%	±%
Labour	Dawn Greatorex	1,109	49.9	▼15.5
Conservative	Gladwyn Gratton	741	33.3	▲12.8
Green	Richard Rowlatt	373	16.8	▲2.6
Majority		368		
Turnout		2,223		
Labour hold		Swing	▼14.2	

=== Carsington Water by-election ===
Carsington Waterby-election: 5 May 2022
Party	Candidate	Votes	%	±%
Conservative	Janet Rose	343	43.8	▼15.8
Liberal Democrats	Monty Stuart-Monteith	274	35.0	▲14.0
Labour	Andrew Hartley	132	16.9	▼2.5
Green	John Ward	34	4.3	▲4.3
Majority		69		
Turnout		783		
Conservative hold		Swing	▼14.9	
