= Brocksford Hall =

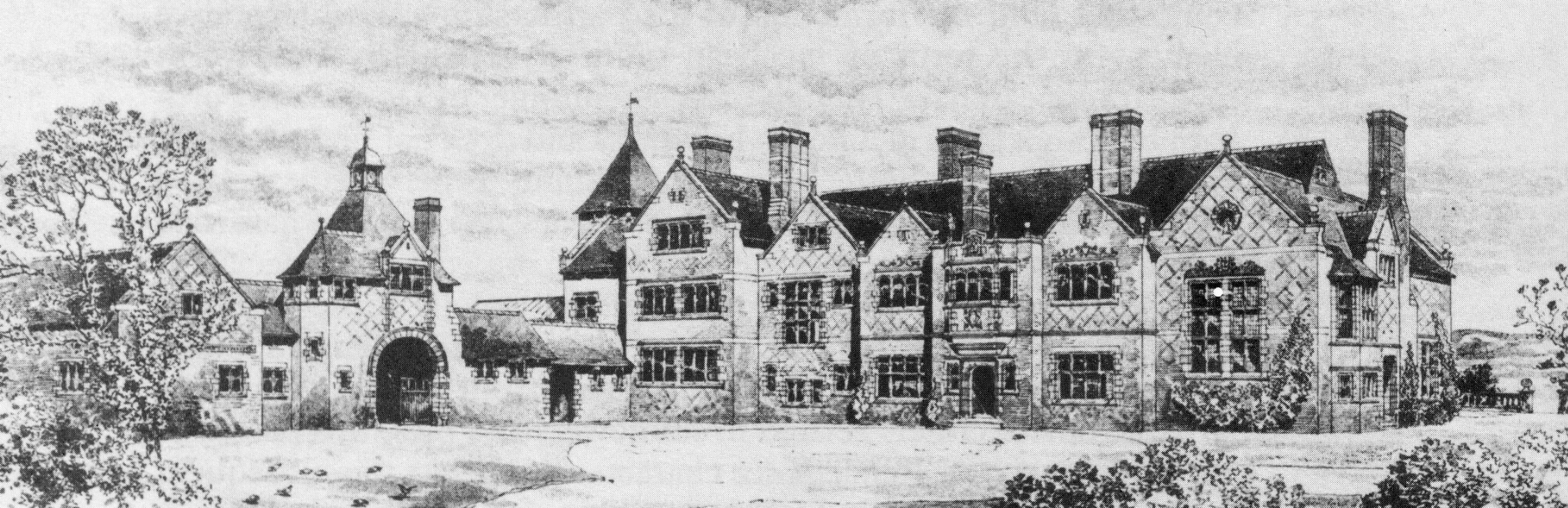
- Brocksford Hall in 1893

- Location in Derbyshire
- 52.896026°N 1.801113°W
- Location: Doveridge, Derbyshire, England

History
- Built: 1893
- Built for: Charles William Jervis Smith

Site notes
- Architect: Douglas and Fordham
- Architectural style: Jacobethan

Listed Building – Grade II
- Designated: 19 November 1985
- Reference no.: 1237732

Brocksford Hall is a country house about one mile (1.6 km) east of Doveridge village, in the south west corner of Derbyshire, England. It is recorded in the National Heritage List for England as a designated Grade II listed building.

== History ==
The house was built in 1893 for Charles William Jervis Smith and designed by the Chester architectural practice of Douglas and Fordham. From 1942 to 1994 it was used as an independent preparatory boarding school. The headmaster of Birkdale School, Mr John Gibson Roberts, moved Birkdale pupils evacuated to Derbyshire during the Second World War into Brocksford Hall after the war. Birkdale continued at Oakbrook under another headmaster. Magfern Estates purchased the hall and 35 acres (140,000 m^{2}) of the estate in 1994. The hall and original outbuildings were converted into private apartments and houses. The later additional outbuildings for the school were demolished.

== Architecture ==
The house was built in Jacobethan style and constructed in Ruabon red brick with much blue brick diapering and Hollington stone dressings. It was the last house designed by Douglas on such a large scale.

== See also ==
- Listed buildings in Doveridge
- List of houses and associated buildings by John Douglas
