= Listed buildings in Doveridge =

Doveridge is a civil parish in the Derbyshire Dales district of Derbyshire, England. The parish contains 24 listed buildings that are recorded in the National Heritage List for England. Of these, one is listed at Grade I, the highest of the three grades, three are at Grade II*, the middle grade, and the others are at Grade II, the lowest grade. The parish contains the village of Doveridge and the surrounding countryside. Apart from a church, a cross in the churchyard, and a public house, all the listed buildings are houses, cottages and associated structures, farmhouses and farm buildings.

== Key ==
Grade	Criteria
I	Buildings of exceptional interest, sometimes considered to be internationally important
II*	Particularly important buildings of more than special interest
II	Buildings of national importance and special interest

== Buildings ==
Name and location	Photograph	Date	Notes	Grade
St Cuthbert's Church; 52.90427°N 1.83214°W		12th century	The church has been altered and extended through the centuries, it was restored in 1840 and 1869, and an octagonal extension was added in 1983. It is built in sandstone, the roof of the south aisle is in slate, and the rest of the roofs are in lead. The church consists of a nave with a clerestory, north and south aisles, a chancel, and a west steeple. The steeple has a tower with three stages, clasping buttresses, a west doorway, lancet windows, a clock face on the east, an embattled parapet, and a recessed spire. Along the clerestory and aisles are plain parapets.	I
Churchyard cross 52.90412°N 1.83201°W		14th century (probable)	The cross in the churchyard of St Cuthbert's Church is in sandstone. It has a square base on five circular steps, on which is a tapering shaft with hollowed-out sides. At the top is a square lantern with trefoiled sides, and a crucifix on one side.	II
Lowerstreet Farmhouse; 52.90097°N 1.82551°W		Early 16th century	The farmhouse is timber framed with close studding and lath and plaster infill, it was partly encased in brick in the 18th century, and a brick rear wing was added. The roof is tiled, there are two storeys, and a T-shaped plan. On the front are three bays and a doorway, and the windows are casements. Inside the house is a large inglenook fireplace.	II*
Flackets Cottage; 52.89719°N 1.78640°W		16th century	The cottage was extended in the 17th and 19th centuries. The earliest part is timber framed with close studding and plaster infill, the 17th-century part is timber framed with brick infill, and the latest part is in red brick. The roof is tiled, there are two storeys, a T-shaped plan, and a front of three bays. The windows are casements and there is a gabled dormer with fretted bargeboards. Inside there are inglenook fireplaces and exposed timber framing.	II
Home Farmhouse; 52.92392°N 1.84235°W	—	16th century	The farmhouse, which was later extended, incorporates elements of a 14th-century aisled hall house. It is in red brick and close studded timber framing, partly encased in brick and weatherboarding, and has a tile roof. There are two storeys and an irregular plan, with an east front of four bays and twin gables, and later wings. On the front is a two-storey gabled porch, and the windows vary; some are casements, some are mullioned or mullioned and transomed, and there are single-light windows with trefoil heads in the gables.	II*
Brookside Cottage; 52.90016°N 1.82179°W	—	17th century	Three cottages combined into one cottage, it is timber framed with brick infill, and was raised in brick in the 19th century creating three gables. There is a single storey and attics, four bays, and a thatched roof. The doorway has a gabled hood, and the windows are casements. Inside there are two inglenook fireplaces, and an upper cruck truss.	II
The Willows; 52.89986°N 1.82243°W	—	17th century	A timber framed house with brick infill and a tile roof. There is a single storey and an attic. On the north front is a doorway with a Tudor arched lintel, and a porch with a gabled hood. To the right is a window, with a flat-roofed dormer above.	II
Woodhouse Farmhouse; 52.91477°N 1.81591°W	—	17th century	The farmhouse is in red brick with a dentilled eaves cornice and a tile roof. There are two storeys and attics, a double range plan, and a south front of three bays. On the front is a gabled porch, and the windows are casements with segmental heads.	II
Ivy House; 52.90420°N 1.82296°W	—	Late 17th century	The house has a timber framed core, it is encased in red brick, and has a floor band, an eaves band, and a tile roof. There are two storeys and three bays. In the centre is a doorway with a lean-to porch, and above it is a small circular window. The other windows are casements with segmental heads, and inside the house are inglenook fireplaces.	II
The Gables; 52.90076°N 1.82451°W	—	Late 17th century	The house, which was extended in the 19th century, is in painted brick, with a tile roof, coped gables and moulded kneelers, and a T-shaped plan. The original part is gabled, on a plinth, with two storeys and an attic. It contains elaborately moulded string courses, cross windows in the lower storeys, and a two-light window in the attic. On the left is a later lower wing with one storey and an attic. It has a lean-to porch, and contains tripartite casement windows, the upper window in a gabled dormer.	II
Eatonhall Farmhouse; 52.92392°N 1.84235°W	—	Early 18th century	The farmhouse is in red brick with a floor band, and a hipped tile roof. There are two storeys and attics, and a symmetrical west front of two bays. The central doorway has a flat head and an arch above. Some windows are casements, some are sashes, there are blocked older windows, two gabled dormers, and at the rear is a large staircase window. Inside, there is an inglenook fireplace.	II
Manor House; 52.90217°N 1.81981°W		Early 18th century	The house is in red brick with floor bands, a dentilled eaves cornice, and a hipped tile roof. There are two storeys and attics, and a front of four bays, the second and fourth bays gabled. The porch has an entablature and a dentilled pediment, and the doorway is round-arched with pilasters and a keystone. In the right bay is a canted bay window, and the other windows are tripartite casements, some with keystones. In the roof are dormers with hipped roofs, and in the left return is a bow window.	II*
Slade House; 52.90010°N 1.82225°W	—	Early 18th century	The house, which was extended later in the century, is in red brick with floor bands and a tile roof. There are two storeys, three bays, and a lean-to bay on the left. On the front is a porch and a narrow staircase window, and the other windows are casements with segmental heads.	II
Old Hall; 52.90172°N 1.82717°W	—	Mid 18th century	A farmhouse in red brick with floor bands and a hipped tile roof. There are two storeys and cellars, and three bays. The central doorway and the windows, which are casements, have gauged brick heads.	II
Old Vicarage; 52.90367°N 1.83201°W	—	Mid 18th century	The vicarage, later a private house, was extended in the 19th century. It is in red brick with rendering, and has a hipped Welsh slate roof, and two storeys. The later part has fronts of three bays. On the south front is a canted bay window and a tripartite sash window, and on the west front are double doors in a moulded architrave. The earlier wing contains a dentilled eaves cornice, and windows with wedge lintels; all the windows are sashes.	II
Eaton Dovedale; 52.93291°N 1.83953°W		Late 18th century	A farmhouse in red brick with a dentilled eaves cornice and a tile roof. There are two storeys and attics, and a front of five bays. The doorway has a moulded surround, the windows are casements with segmental heads, and at the rear is a tall staircase window.	II
Heath House Farmhouse; 52.90121°N 1.78783°W	—	Late 18th century	The farmhouse is in red brick with a dentilled eaves cornice and a tile roof. There are two storeys and an attic, and four bays. The doorway and the windows, which are casements, have segmental heads, and there is a small attic window.	II
Ley Hill Farmhouse and barn 52.89858°N 1.80750°W	—	Late 18th century	The farmhouse and barn are in red brick with hipped tile roofs, two storeys and an L-shaped plan. On the west front is a large bow window with a half-domed lead roof, and to its left is a doorway flanked by windows with segmental heads. The south front has a full-height canted bay window with a Venetian-type window in each floor, and a hipped roof dormer above. There is a long rear wing with the barn attached.	II
Stable block and gates, Petworth; 52.90457°N 1.83190°W	—	Late 18th century	The stable block is in red brick with some stone dressings and a Welsh slate roof. There are one and two storeys, and a triangular plan. The south front is symmetrical with eleven bays. The middle bay is taller and pedimented, and contains a segmental carriage arch, above which is a lunette and a sill band. The flanking bays contain cross windows, segmental-arched doorways, segmental-headed casement windows, and circular windows. One of the other ranges contains stables with segmental-headed casement windows, and the other range has coach houses. The gates are in wrought iron.	II
Petworth; 52.90480°N 1.83242°W	—	1777 (probable)	A red brick house with sandstone dressings, a floor band, a moulded eaves cornice, and a hipped Welsh slate roof. There are two storeys and three bays, the middle bay projecting under a pediment. The central doorway has pilasters and a pediment, and the windows are sashes with moulded architraves.	II
North Lodge Farmhouse; 52.91130°N 1.82955°W	—	Early 19th century	The farmhouse is in red brick with a tile roof, three storeys and three bays. On the front is an open flat-roofed porch with fluted columns. The windows are casements and sashes, all with segmental heads.	II
The Cavendish Arms; 52.90688°N 1.82737°W		Early 19th century	The public house is in red brick, mainly roughcast, with a dentilled eaves cornice, and a hipped tile roof. There are two storeys, three bays, and a twin gabled rear wing. The doorway has paired pilasters and a moulded surround, and the windows are sashes, those in the right bay tripartite.	II
Brocksford Hall and stable block 52.89606°N 1.80128°W	—	1893	A small country house, later a school, designed by Douglas and Fordham in Jacobean style. It is in Ruabon red brick with blue brick diapering, Hollington stone dressings, and tile roofs with coped gables, moulded kneelers, and ball finials. The north front has seven bays and five gables, and contains a two-storey porch with a Tudor arched doorway. Most of the windows are mullioned and transomed, there is an oriel window, and a two-storey canted bay window. To the southeast is a tower with a pyramidal roof. The stable block is in brick and timber framing with an L-shaped plan, it contains a carriage entrance, and has a pedimented bell turret with an ogee-capped louvred lantern and a weathervane.	II
Lodge, Brocksford Hall; 52.89715°N 1.79810°W	—	1893	The lodge was designed by Douglas and Fordham, and has a red brick lower floor with sandstone dressings, a jettied timber framed upper floor and a tile roof. There are two storeys, and the east front has two bays, the left bay wider and gabled. On the front is a canted bay window, a porch with a hipped roof, and casement windows.	II
