= Listed buildings in Hollington, Derbyshire =

Hollington is a civil parish in the Derbyshire Dales district of Derbyshire, England. The parish contains five listed buildings that are recorded in the National Heritage List for England. All the listed buildings are designated at Grade II, the lowest of the three grades, which is applied to "buildings of national importance and special interest". The parish contains the village of Hollington and the surrounding area. Apart from a wall and gate piers moved from elsewhere, all the listed buildings are farmhouses or farm buildings.

== Buildings ==
Name and location	Photograph	Date	Notes
Old Farmhouse, Lodge Farm; 52.95503°N 1.65680°W	—	17th century	The farmhouse, later used for other purposes, is in brick and timber framing, it has the remains of a thatched roof covered with corrugated iron, and a stone coped gable with plain kneelers. There is a single storey and attics, and a front of four bays. The building contains doorways, windows, and three eyebrow dormers. Inside, there is one cruck truss, and an inglenook fireplace with a moulded bressummer.
Gate piers and wall, Ardsley House; 52.94114°N 1.66954°W	—	Early 18th century	The gate piers and the wall west of the house originated in Longford Hall, and were moved to the present site in about 1950. The wall is in red brick with stone copings, and has pilaster buttresses. The gate piers are in sandstone, and have a shallow cruciform plan, with pilasters and inverted carved brackets on the sides. Each pier is surmounted by a moulded abacus and has an urn-like top.
Ivy House Farmhouse; 52.95561°N 1.66087°W	—	Early 18th century	A house in red brick with floor bands, a dentilled eaves band, and a tile roof with coped gables and moulded kneelers. There are two storeys and attics, and a T-shaped plan, with a front range of two bays, and a lower rear wing. In the ground floor are two cross windows, one with a flat head in a segmental arch, and the upper floor contains two-light windows with flat heads in segmental arches.
Barn Farmhouse; 52.95475°N 1.65815°W	—	Mid 18th century	A farmhouse and cottage, later combined, it is in brick, with a dentilled eaves band, and a tile roof with coped gables and plain kneelers. There are two storeys and attics, three bays, and a gabled stair tower at the rear. The doorways and most of the windows, which are casements, have segmental-arched heads. In the tower is a staircase window.
Stables with loft, Barn Farm; 52.95499°N 1.65863°W	—	1852	The stables with a loft above are in red brick with tile roofs. There are two storeys and an L-shaped plan. The building contains four doorways with basket arches, other doorways, windows, and three tiers of vents.
