= Listed buildings in Cubley, Derbyshire =

Cubley is a civil parish in the Derbyshire Dales district of Derbyshire, England. The parish contains twelve listed buildings that are recorded in the National Heritage List for England. Of these, one is listed at Grade I, the highest of the three grades, and the others are at Grade II, the lowest grade. The parish contains the settlements of Great Cubley and Little Cubley, and the surrounding countryside. The listed buildings consist of houses, cottages and associated structures, a church and memorials in the churchyard, farmhouses, and a village pump.

== Key ==
Grade	Criteria
I	Buildings of exceptional interest, sometimes considered to be internationally important
II	Buildings of national importance and special interest

== Buildings ==
Name and location	Photograph	Date	Notes	Grade
St Andrew's Church; 52.93643°N 1.75609°W		Mid 11th century	The church has been altered and extended through the centuries, it was restored in 1872–74 by J. P. St Aubyn, and the porch was added in 1909. The church is built in sandstone with a tile roof, and consists of a nave, a south aisle, a south porch, a chancel, and a west tower. The tower has three stages and angle buttresses, and it contains a west doorway with a moulded surround and a pointed arch, above which is a moulded string course, and a three light window. On the north and south sides are friezes with coats of arms, on the west side is a clock face, and the bell openings have Y-tracery. At the top is an embattled parapet with corner crocketed pinnacles. The east window has five lights.	I
Gravestones and table tombs, St Andrew's Church; 52.93629°N 1.75609°W	—	Late 17th century and later	The group in the churchyard consists of three semicircular-headed gravestones to the east, and two table tombs to the west, all in sandstone. They have various inscriptions and carved motifs.	II
Table tomb, St Andrew's Church; 52.93622°N 1.75609°W	—	Early 18th century	The table tomb in the churchyard is in sandstone. It has a panelled base, rusticated quoins on the corners, a rusticated band, and a thick slab with a chamfered edge. On the eastern panel is an inscription.	II
Cubley Lodge House; 52.92314°N 1.75944°W	—	Mid 18th century	A farmhouse in red brick on a plinth, with stone dressings, floor bands, a dentilled eaves cornice, and a tile roof with coped gables and kneelers. There are two storeys and attics, a front of two bays and a later bay to the right, and rear additions. The central doorway has a fanlight and a keystone. The windows are casements with keystones, and in the attic are two gabled dormers.	II
The Old Rectory; 52.93666°N 1.75506°W	—	Mid 18th century	The rectory, later a private house, which was much altered in the 19th century, is in red brick with stone dressings, a dentilled eaves band, and a tile roof, partly hipped. There are two storeys, the original part has four bays, the addition to the south in the early 19th century has two bays, and the addition in the late 19th century to the north has five bays. The doorway has pilasters and a porch with a lead roof, and on the south front is a large canted bay window. The windows in the earlier parts are sashes, and in the latest addition are casements, most windows with segmental heads.	II
Gravestone, St Andrew's Church; 52.93631°N 1.75582°W	—	1771	The gravestone in the churchyard is in sandstone, and consists of a semicircular-headed stone about 2 feet (0.61 m) high. On the east face is a segmental pediment, and on the face is an inscription and a carved angel's head and wings, and on it is a naked figure in a moulded oval surround.	II
The Old Smithy; 52.93662°N 1.76191°W	—	1817	A house and smithy, later a house and workshop, in red brick with a sawtooth eaves band and a hipped tile roof. The house has two storeys and a single bay, the workshop has a single storey and two bays, and there is a recessed lean-to at the north. The windows are casements, some with segmental heads, the doorway has a semicircular head, and on the front is a datestone.	II
1, 2, 2a, 3, 4 and 5, The Row, Great Cubley; 52.94187°N 1.75669°W	—	Early 19th century	Six workers' cottages in three pairs, they are in red brick, with stone dressings in the central pair, and hipped tile roofs. There are two storeys, the central pair have two bays, and the outer pairs four bays each, and at the rear each pair has a single-bay service wing. In the middle pair is a central semicircular-headed doorway; all the other entrances are in the gable ends. The windows are casements, in the central pair, the ground floor windows have wedge lintels, and in the outer pairs the ground floor windows have segmental heads.	II
North Farmhouse; 52.93547°N 1.76226°W	—	Early 19th century	The farmhouse is in red brick with a floor band, dentilled eaves, and a tile roof. There are three storeys, three bays, and a single-storey lean-to on the north. In the centre is a gabled porch and a round-headed doorway with a semicircular fanlight. The windows in the lower floors are casements, and in the top floor they are horizontally-sliding sashes.	II
Cottage north of The Old Smithy; 52.93677°N 1.76198°W	—	1826	The house is in red brick with a dentilled eaves band and a tile roof. There are two storeys and two bays. The windows are casements, those in the ground floor with segmental heads. Between the upper floor windows is a datestone.	II
Rosebank Farmhouse; 52.93618°N 1.76150°W	—	c. 1840	The farmhouse is in red brick with painted stone dressings and a tile roof. There are two storeys and three bays, and a later recessed bay. On the front is an open timber porch with a lead roof, and a doorway with a moulded surround. The windows are sashes, those in the original part with wedge lintels.	II
Village Pump; 52.94044°N 1.75499°W		1902	The pump is in cast iron, and has a square section. There is a spout on the front, a cow-tail handle on the right side, and a pyramidal cap and a finial. On the front and sides are panels, those on the front containing letters, the date and an inscription.	II
