= Cubley, Derbyshire =

Civil parish in Derbyshire, England

Coordinates: 52.941°N 1.763°W

Cubley
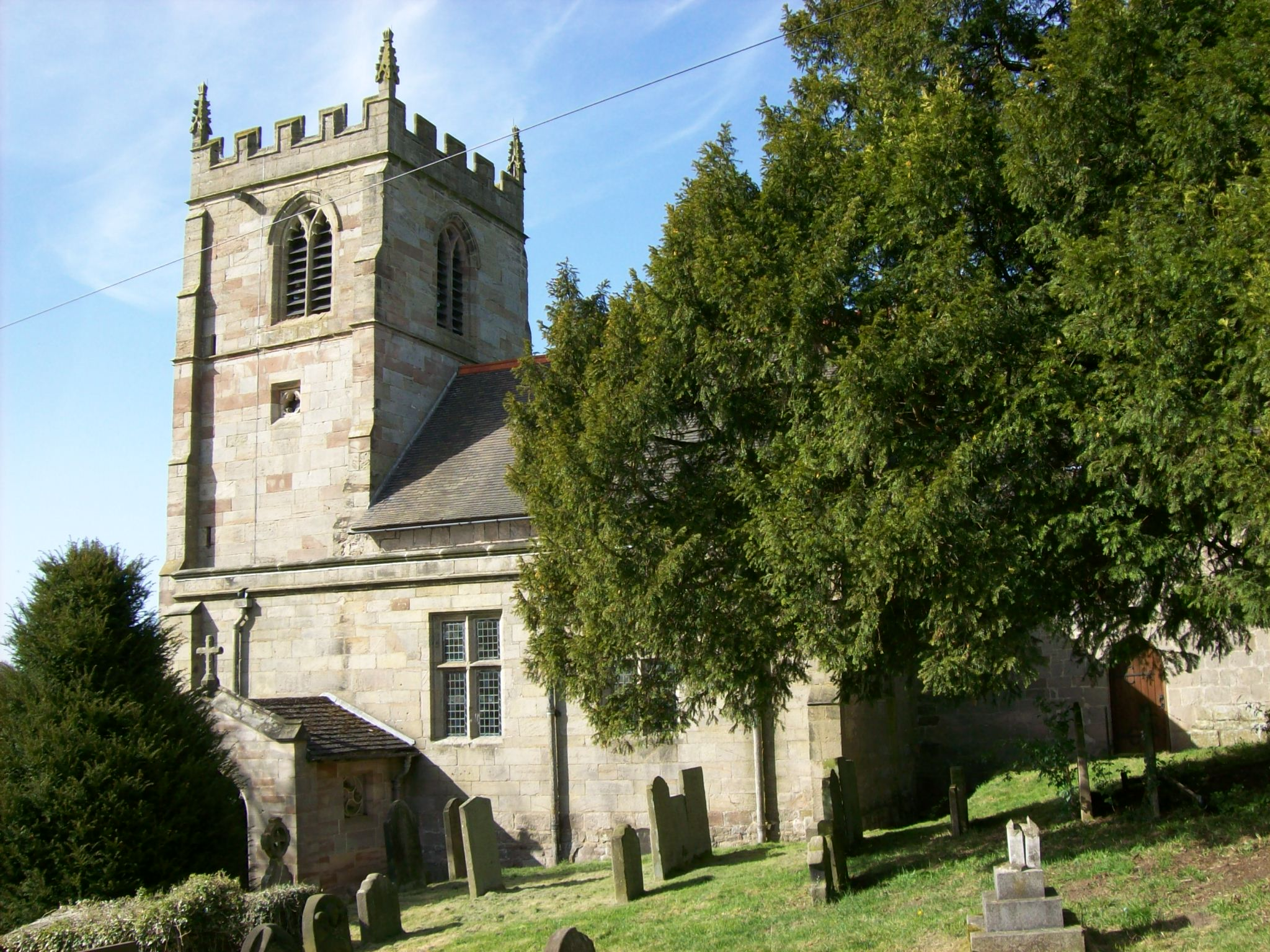
- St Andrew's Church, from the south

- Location within Derbyshire
- Population: 232 (2011)
- OS grid reference: SK160382
- District: Derbyshire Dales
- Shire county: Derbyshire
- Region: East Midlands
- Country: England
- Sovereign state: United Kingdom
- Post town: ASHBOURNE
- Postcode district: DE6
- Dialling code: 01335
- Police: Derbyshire
- Fire: Derbyshire
- Ambulance: East Midlands
- UK Parliament: Derbyshire Dales

Cubley is a parish of two closely linked villages six miles (10 km) south of Ashbourne in Derbyshire. Great Cubley and Little Cubley are known collectively as Cubley. The parish church of St Andrew is roughly equidistant from the two, but is formally in Great Cubley. The church is Grade I listed. The population of the civil parish (including Alkmonton) taken at the 2011 Census was 232.

== History ==
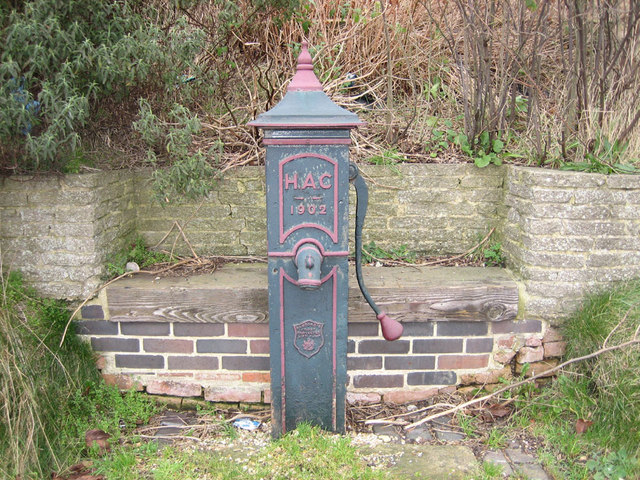
The village pump, dated 1902, in Great Cubley

Cubley is mentioned in the Domesday Book where it is spelt Cobelei. The book says under the title of "The lands of Henry de Ferrers":

"In Cubley Siward had two carucates of land to the geld. There is land for two ploughs. There are now two ploughs in demesne and four villans and four bordars and one slave having one plough. There is a priest and a church and one mill rendering 12 pence and eight acres of meadow and woodland pasture one league long and one league broad. TRE worth 100 shillings now 40 shillings. Ralph holds it."

== Notable people ==
- John Flower, a theologian, was born here in the seventeenth century.
- Michael Johnson, the father of the author Samuel Johnson, was born here.
- Roy Wood, musician (The Move, ELO, Wizzard), lives in the former Howard Arms public house.

== See also ==
- Listed buildings in Cubley, Derbyshire
