= 2015 Derbyshire Dales District Council election =

2015 UK local government election

← 2011	7 May 2015	2019 →

All 39 seats to Derbyshire Dales District Council 20 seats needed for a majority
	First party	Second party	Third party
Party	Conservative	Labour	Liberal Democrats
Last election	29 seats	5 seats	4 seats
Seats won	29	5	3
Seat change	Steady	Steady	▼1
Popular vote	15,071	8,926	2,402
Percentage	45.3%	26.9%	7.2%
Swing	▼3.4%	▼0.9%	▼10.9%
	Fourth party
Party	Independent
Last election	1 seat
Seats won	2
Seat change	▲1
Popular vote	2,062
Percentage	6.2%
Swing	▲3.3%
- Map showing the composition of Derbyshire Dales District Council following the election. Striped wards have mixed representation.
Council control before election
Conservative
Council control after election
Conservative

The 2015 Derbyshire Dales District Council election was held on 7 May 2015 to elect all 39 members of Derbyshire Dales District Council. This was on the same day as other local elections.

The Conservative Party retained control of the council for the fourth consecutive election, with a majority of 19.

== Ward results ==
=== Ashbourne North ===
Ashbourne North
Party	Candidate	Votes	%	±%
Conservative	Sue Bull	1,210	64.0	1.9
Conservative	Tony Millward	1,035		
Labour	Che Page	681	36.0	−1.9
Majority				
Turnout				
Conservative hold		Swing		
Conservative hold		Swing		

=== Ashbourne South ===
Ashbourne South
Party	Candidate	Votes	%	±%
Conservative	Phil Chell	1,308	53.8	−11.8
Conservative	Tom Donnelly	1,187		
Labour	Simon Meredith	596	24.5	−11.4
Green	Andy White	527	21.7	21.7
Majority				
Turnout				
Conservative hold		Swing		
Conservative hold		Swing		

=== Bakewell ===
Bakewell
Party	Candidate	Votes	%	±%
Conservative	Alyson Hill	1,463	44.3	
Conservative	Helen Froggatt	1,372		
Conservative	Philippa Tilbrook	1,298		
Green	Ian Wood	743	22.5	
Labour	Jacob Butler	583	17.7	
Labour	Paul Vaughan	525		
UKIP	Sarah Lamb	511	15.5	
UKIP	Andy Howard	430		
UKIP	Tilly Ward	333		
Majority				
Turnout				
Conservative hold		Swing		
Conservative hold		Swing		
Conservative hold		Swing		

=== Bradwell ===
Bradwell
Party	Candidate	Votes	%	±%
Conservative	Chris Furness	756	67.0	
Labour	Nicholas Whitehead	373	33.0	
Majority				
Turnout				
Conservative hold		Swing		

=== Brailsford ===
Brailsford
Party	Candidate	Votes	%	±%
Conservative	Angus Jenkins	Unopposed	n/a	n/a
Majority				
Turnout				
Conservative hold		Swing		

=== Calver ===
Calver
Party	Candidate	Votes	%	±%
Conservative	John Tibenham	753	64.1	
Labour	Barry Nottage	421	35.9	
Majority				
Turnout				
Conservative hold		Swing		

=== Carsington Water ===
Carsington Water
Party	Candidate	Votes	%	±%
Conservative	Lewis Rose	Unopposed	n/a	n/a
Majority				
Turnout				
Conservative hold		Swing		

=== Chatsworth ===
Chatsworth
Party	Candidate	Votes	%	±%
Conservative	Susan Hobson	Unopposed	n/a	n/a
Majority				
Turnout				
Conservative hold		Swing		

=== Clifton and Bradley ===
Clifton and Bradley
Party	Candidate	Votes	%	±%
Conservative	Andrew Shirley	727	60.4	
Independent	Ian Bates	298	24.8	
UKIP	Richard Stone	179	14.9	
Majority				
Turnout				
Conservative hold		Swing		

=== Darley Dale ===
Darley Dale
Party	Candidate	Votes	%	±%
Conservative	Jason Atkin	1,264	36.6	
Conservative	Andrew Statham	1,099		
Conservative	Mark Salt	1,089		
Independent	John Evans	830	24.0	
Labour	Julie Morrison	766	22.2	
Labour	Pam Butler	731		
Independent	Maresa Mellor	637		
Independent	David Smith	610		
UKIP	Michael Hancocks	595	17.2	
UKIP	Marco Taaffe	359		
UKIP	Martin Sneap	349		
Majority				
Turnout				
Conservative gain from Liberal Democrats		Swing		
Conservative hold		Swing		
Conservative gain from Liberal Democrats		Swing		

=== Dovedale and Parwich ===
Dovedale and Parwich
Party	Candidate	Votes	%	±%
Conservative	Richard FitzHerbert	Unopposed	n/a	n/a
Majority				
Turnout				
Conservative hold		Swing		

=== Doveridge and Sudbury ===
Doveridge and Sudbury
Party	Candidate	Votes	%	±%
Conservative	Albert Catt	873	75.0	
UKIP	Joe Hogan	291	25.0	
Majority				
Turnout				
Conservative hold		Swing		

=== Hartington and Taddington ===
Hartington and Taddington
Party	Candidate	Votes	%	±%
Conservative	David Chapman	Unopposed	n/a	n/a
Majority				
Turnout				
Conservative hold		Swing		

=== Hathersage and Eyam ===
Hathersage and Eyam
Party	Candidate	Votes	%	±%
Conservative	Jean Monks	1,232	55.3	
Conservative	Vicky Massey	1,228		
Labour	Elizabeth Coe	998	44.7	
Labour	Peter O'Brien	971		
Majority				
Turnout				
Conservative hold		Swing		
Conservative hold		Swing		

=== Hulland ===
Hulland
Party	Candidate	Votes	%	±%
Conservative	Richard Bright	Unopposed	n/a	n/a
Majority				
Turnout				
Conservative hold		Swing		

=== Lathkill and Bradford ===
Lathkill and Bradford
Party	Candidate	Votes	%	±%
Independent	Graham Elliott	582	62.3	
Independent	David Frederickson	352	37.7	
Majority				
Turnout				
Independent gain from Independent		Swing		

=== Litton and Longstone ===
Litton and Longstone
Party	Candidate	Votes	%	±%
Conservative	Neil Horton	Unopposed	n/a	n/a
Majority				
Turnout				
Conservative hold		Swing		

=== Masson ===
Masson
Party	Candidate	Votes	%	±%
Conservative	Garry Purdy	946	56.1	
Labour	Joyce Pawley	741	43.9	
Conservative	Richard Walsh	686		
Labour	Ian Page	653		
Majority				
Turnout				
Conservative hold		Swing		
Labour hold		Swing		

=== Matlock All Saints ===
Matlock All Saints
Party	Candidate	Votes	%	±%
Liberal Democrats	Susan Burfoot	1,341	42.2	
Liberal Democrats	Martin Burfoot	1,164		
Conservative	Ann Elliott	1,065	33.6	
Conservative	Geoff Stevens	1,044		
Conservative	Sam Gregory	948		
Liberal Democrats	David Jones	849		
Labour	Jane Littlechilds	768	24.2	
Labour	John Cowings	763		
Majority				
Turnout				
Liberal Democrats hold		Swing		
Liberal Democrats gain from Conservative		Swing		
Conservative hold		Swing		

=== Matlock St. Giles ===
Matlock St. Giles
Party	Candidate	Votes	%	±%
Liberal Democrats	Steve Flitter	1,061	31.3	
Labour	Deborah Botham	959	28.3	
Conservative	Jacquie Stevens	924	27.3	
Conservative	Dan Hopkinson	840		
Liberal Democrats	Derek Woodward	738		
Labour	Isobel Fisher	711		
Conservative	Jeff Sterland	711		
Labour	James Ilott	689		
Liberal Democrats	Barry Hopkinson	683		
UKIP	Fred Richardson	444	13.1	
UKIP	Adrian Ward	365		
UKIP	Rachel Roberts	311		
Majority				
Turnout				
Liberal Democrats hold		Swing		
Labour gain from Conservative		Swing		
Conservative hold		Swing		

=== Norbury ===
Norbury
Party	Candidate	Votes	%	±%
Conservative	Tony Morley	799	76.8	
UKIP	Michael Cruddas	241	23.2	
Majority				
Turnout				
Conservative hold		Swing		

=== Stanton ===
Stanton
Party	Candidate	Votes	%	±%
Conservative	Jo Wild	Unopposed	n/a	n/a
Majority				
Turnout				
Conservative hold		Swing		

=== Tideswell ===
Tideswell
Party	Candidate	Votes	%	±%
Conservative	Jennifer Bower	655	62.1	
Labour	Angus McLardy	400	37.9	
Majority				
Turnout				
Conservative hold		Swing		

=== Winster and South Darley ===
Winster and South Darley
Party	Candidate	Votes	%	±%
Independent	Colin Swindell	Unopposed	n/a	n/a
Majority				
Turnout				
Independent gain from Labour		Swing		

=== Wirksworth ===
Wirksworth
Party	Candidate	Votes	%	±%
Labour	Irene Ratcliffe	1,642	41.2	
Labour	Mike Ratcliffe	1,353		
Labour	Pete Slack	1,237		
Conservative	Gladwyn Gratton	1,096	27.5	
Green	Josh Stockwell	668	16.8	
Green	Ivan Dixon	599		
UKIP	Michael Hawley	578	14.5	
Green	John Youatt	280		
Majority				
Turnout				
Labour hold		Swing		
Labour hold		Swing		
Labour hold		Swing		

== By-elections between 2015 and 2019 ==
=== Ashbourne South by-election ===
Ashbourne South by-election: 26 October 2017
Party	Candidate	Votes	%	±%
Conservative	Dermot Murphy	495	46.2	−7.6
Liberal Democrats	Rebecca Goodall	334	31.2	+31.2
Labour	Andy White	242	22.6	−1.9
Majority		161	15.0	
Turnout		1,071		
Conservative hold		Swing		
