= Hollington =

Hollington may refer to:

- Hollington, East Sussex, England
- Hollington, Derbyshire, England
- Hollington, Hampshire, England
- Hollington, Staffordshire, England
