= St Cuthbert's Church, Doveridge =

Coordinates: 52°54′14.53″N 1°49′53.97″W

St Cuthbert’s Church, Doveridge
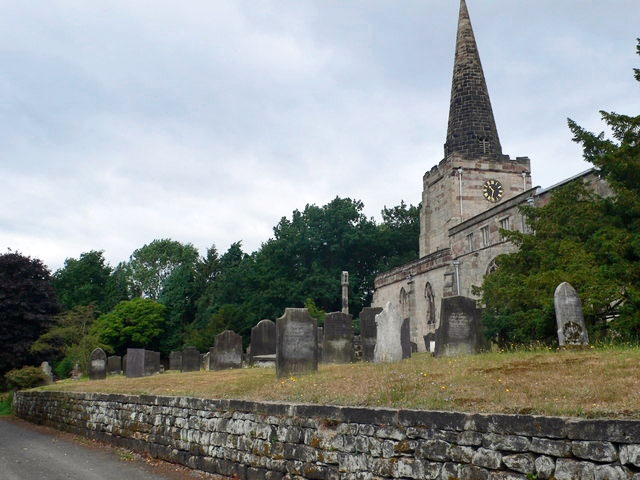
- St Cuthbert’s Church, Doveridge (photograph by Eirian Evans)
- St Cuthbert’s Church, Doveridge
- Location: Doveridge
- Country: England
- Denomination: Church of England

History
- Dedication: St Cuthbert

Architecture
- Heritage designation: Grade I listed

Administration
- Diocese: Diocese of Derby
- Archdeaconry: Derby
- Deanery: Longford
- Parish: Doveridge

St Cuthbert's Church, Doveridge is a Grade I listed parish church in the Church of England in Doveridge, Derbyshire.

== History ==
The church dates from the late 12th century. It comprises a west steeple, a clerestoreyed nave with aisles and chancel. It was restored in 1840 and again in 1869.

== Parish status ==
The church is in a joint parish with

- St John's Church, Alkmonton
- St Andrew's Church, Cubley
- St Giles’ Church, Marston Montgomery
- St Paul's Church, Scropton
- St Peter's Church, Somersal Herbert
- All Saints’ Church, Sudbury

== Memorials ==
- Katherine Wall (d. 1713)
- Ralph Okeover (d. 1487)
- William Davenport (d. 1640)
- Arabella Cavendish (d. 1739)
- Francis Cavendish (d. 1650)
- Rev. John Fitzherbert (d. 1785)
- Rev. Thomas Cavendish (d. 1850) by C Maile Sc of London
- Thomas Milward (d. 1658)

== Organ ==
The pipe organ was built by Steele and Keay and dates from 1867. A specification of the organ can be found on the National Pipe Organ Register.

== See also ==
- Grade I listed churches in Derbyshire
- Grade I listed buildings in Derbyshire
- Listed buildings in Doveridge
