= 2007 Derbyshire Dales District Council election =

2007 UK local government election

Map of the results of the 2007 Derbyshire Dales District Council election. Conservatives in blue, Liberal Democrats in yellow, Labour in red and independents in grey.

The 2007 Derbyshire Dales District Council election took place on 3 May 2007 to elect members of Derbyshire Dales District Council in Derbyshire, England. The whole council was up for election and the Conservative Party stayed in overall control of the council, making a net gain of one seat at the expense of Labour.

== Election result ==
The Conservatives gained one seat from Labour in the only change at the election to take them to 26 seats. 10 of the Conservatives had been guaranteed seats before the election as they had no opponents. The Liberal Democrats remained on 8 seats, Labour dropped to 4 seats and there continued to be 1 independent.

Derbyshire Dales local election result 2007
Party	Seats	Gains	Losses	Net gain/loss	Seats %	Votes %	Votes	+/−
Conservative	26	1	0	+1	66.7	49.0	17,531	+6.5%
Liberal Democrats	8	0	0	0	20.5	34.0	12,141	-1.7%
Labour	4	0	1	-1	10.3	9.9	3,548	-4.4%
Independent	1	0	0	0	2.6	4.4	1,558	-3.1%
Green	0	0	0	0	0	2.7	981	+2.7%

== Ward results ==
Ashbourne North (2 seats)
Party	Candidate	Votes	%	±%
Conservative	Stephen Bull	unopposed		
Conservative	Tony Millward	unopposed		
Conservative hold		Swing		
Conservative hold		Swing		

Ashbourne South (2 seats)
Party	Candidate	Votes	%	±%
Conservative	Alan Hodkinson	unopposed		
Conservative	Andrew Lewer	unopposed		
Conservative hold		Swing		
Conservative hold		Swing		

Bakewell (3 seats)
Party	Candidate	Votes	%	±%
Conservative	Judith Twigg	1,200		
Conservative	Carol Walker	1,057		
Conservative	Peter Duncan	1,041		
Liberal Democrats	Patricia Birchley	479		
Liberal Democrats	Pamela Molyneux	448		
Liberal Democrats	Eleanor Nancolas	386		
Turnout		4,611	45	−1
Conservative hold		Swing		
Conservative hold		Swing		
Conservative hold		Swing		

Bradwell
Party	Candidate	Votes	%	±%
Conservative	Janet Goodison	unopposed		
Conservative hold		Swing		

Brailsford
Party	Candidate	Votes	%	±%
Conservative	Carol Valentine	unopposed		
Conservative hold		Swing		

Calver
Party	Candidate	Votes	%	±%
Conservative	Cate Hunt	632	77.4	+5.2
Liberal Democrats	Marija Nicholson	185	22.6	−5.2
Majority		447	54.7	+10.2
Turnout		817	53	+3
Conservative hold		Swing		

Carsington Water
Party	Candidate	Votes	%	±%
Conservative	Lewis Rose	553	76.2	−1.5
Green	Mary Smail	93	12.8	+12.8
Liberal Democrats	Guy Wheatcroft	80	11.0	−11.3
Majority		460	63.4	+7.9
Turnout		726	48	+8
Conservative hold		Swing		

Chatsworth
Party	Candidate	Votes	%	±%
Conservative	Michael Longden	648	75.5	
Liberal Democrats	Zoe Wareham	210	24.5	
Majority		438	51.0	
Turnout		858	60	
Conservative hold		Swing		

Clifton & Bradley
Party	Candidate	Votes	%	±%
Conservative	Ian Bates	unopposed		
Conservative hold		Swing		

Darley Dale (3 seats)
Party	Candidate	Votes	%	±%
Liberal Democrats	David Burton	1,016		
Liberal Democrats	David Fearn	978		
Liberal Democrats	Nigel Allwood	934		
Conservative	Brian Fearn	541		
Independent	John Evans	471		
Independent	Samantha Kay	456		
Turnout		4,396	41	+3
Liberal Democrats hold		Swing		
Liberal Democrats hold		Swing		
Liberal Democrats hold		Swing		

Dovedale & Parwich
Party	Candidate	Votes	%	±%
Conservative	Simon Spencer	unopposed		
Conservative hold		Swing		

Doveridge & Sudbury
Party	Candidate	Votes	%	±%
Conservative	Albert Catt	496	68.8	
Independent	Nesta Jarville	225	31.2	
Majority		271	37.6	
Turnout		721	48	
Conservative hold		Swing		

Hartington & Taddington
Party	Candidate	Votes	%	±%
Conservative	David Chapman	417	74.9	+0.9
Liberal Democrats	Richard Bardsley	140	25.1	−0.9
Majority		277	49.7	+1.7
Turnout		557	42	+4
Conservative hold		Swing		

Hathersage & Eyam (2 seats)
Party	Candidate	Votes	%	±%
Conservative	Jacqueline Bevan	1,039		
Conservative	David Hoskin	1,008		
Liberal Democrats	Barbara Bowman	455		
Turnout		2,502	47	
Conservative hold		Swing		
Conservative hold		Swing		

Hulland
Party	Candidate	Votes	%	±%
Conservative	Jennifer Radford	unopposed		
Conservative hold		Swing		

Lathkill & Bradford
Party	Candidate	Votes	%	±%
Independent	Andrew McCloy	406	66.2	+14.0
Conservative	Andy Howard	207	33.8	−14.0
Majority		199	32.5	+28.1
Turnout		613	45	−0.0
Independent hold		Swing		

Litton & Longstone
Party	Candidate	Votes	%	±%
Conservative	James Bentley	491	71.3	
Liberal Democrats	Veronica Rainsford	198	28.7	
Majority		293	42.6	
Turnout		689	50	
Conservative hold		Swing		

Masson (2 seats)
Party	Candidate	Votes	%	±%
Labour	John March	427		
Conservative	Peter Hume	403		
Conservative	Tony Davis	380		
Labour	Nicholas Elliott	366		
Liberal Democrats	David Wildgoose	152		
Liberal Democrats	Tracy Steadman	149		
Turnout		1,877	40	+7
Labour hold		Swing		
Conservative gain from Labour		Swing		

Matlock All Saints (3 seats)
Party	Candidate	Votes	%	±%
Liberal Democrats	Susan Burfoot	997		
Conservative	Geoff Stevens	964		
Liberal Democrats	David Barker	911		
Conservative	Ann Elliott	833		
Conservative	Sam Gregory	773		
Liberal Democrats	Martyn Moss	715		
Green	Erik Douglas	289		
Turnout		5,482	46	+3
Liberal Democrats hold		Swing		
Conservative hold		Swing		
Liberal Democrats hold		Swing		

Matlock St Giles (3 seats)
Party	Candidate	Votes	%	±%
Liberal Democrats	Stephen Flitter	1,042		
Liberal Democrats	Barry Hopkinson	865		
Liberal Democrats	Tony Rosser	865		
Conservative	Barrie Tipping	787		
Conservative	Jacquie Stevens	761		
Conservative	Ursula Lunn	661		
Turnout		4,981	43	+1
Liberal Democrats hold		Swing		
Liberal Democrats hold		Swing		
Liberal Democrats hold		Swing		

Norbury
Party	Candidate	Votes	%	±%
Conservative	Kenneth Bull	unopposed		
Conservative hold		Swing		

Stanton
Party	Candidate	Votes	%	±%
Conservative	Shirley Buckingham	346	59.6	
Liberal Democrats	Pat Wildgoose	235	40.4	
Majority		111	19.2	
Turnout		581	39	
Conservative hold		Swing		

Tideswell
Party	Candidate	Votes	%	±%
Conservative	Tracy Critchlow	344	64.5	+13.6
Green	Timothy George	95	17.8	+17.8
Liberal Democrats	Shirley Holt	94	17.6	−31.5
Majority		249	46.7	+44.9
Turnout		533	36	−1
Conservative hold		Swing		

Winster & South Darley
Party	Candidate	Votes	%	±%
Conservative	John Moseley	371	44.2	+23.5
Labour	Colin Swindell	249	29.6	+14.9
Liberal Democrats	Martyn Wright	220	26.2	−38.4
Majority		122	14.5	−29.4
Turnout		840	60	+8
Conservative hold		Swing		

Wirksworth (3 seats)
Party	Candidate	Votes	%	±%
Labour	Irene Ratcliffe	937		
Labour	Mike Ratcliffe	789		
Labour	Peter Slack	780		
Conservative	Gladwyn Gratton	637		
Conservative	Helen Walker	508		
Green	Josh Stockell	504		
Conservative	Gavin Williamson	433		
Liberal Democrats	Roger Green	387		
Turnout		4,975	41	+10
Labour hold		Swing		
Labour hold		Swing		
Labour hold		Swing		

== By-elections between 2007 and 2011 ==
=== Masson ===
A by-election was held in Masson on 6 December 2007 after the death of Labour councillor John March. The by-election was won by Conservative Garry Purdy.

Masson by-election 6 December 2007
Party	Candidate	Votes	%	±%
Conservative	Garry Purdy	356	48.2	+7.2
Labour	Belinda Heaney	256	34.7	−8.8
Liberal Democrats	Tracy Steadman	126	17.1	+1.6
Majority		100	13.5	
Turnout		738	30.0	
Conservative gain from Labour		Swing		

=== Matlock St Giles ===
A by-election was held in Matlock St Giles on 4 June 2009 after the death of Liberal Democrat councillor Tony Rosser. The seat was held for the Liberal Democrats by Cate Hopkinson.

Matlock St Giles by-election 4 June 2009
Party	Candidate	Votes	%	±%
Liberal Democrats	Cate Hopkinson	825	43.7	−13.3
Conservative	Barry Tipping	659	34.9	−8.2
Independent	Alan Bower	406	21.5	+21.5
Majority		166	8.8	
Turnout		1,890		
Liberal Democrats hold		Swing		

=== Winster & South Darley ===
A by-election was held in Winster and South Darley after Conservative councillor John Moseley stepped down to join the Peak District National Park Authority. The seat was gained for Labour by Colin Swindell, who became the then youngest councillor on Derbyshire Dales Council at the age of 26.

Winster & South Darley by-election 23 July 2009
Party	Candidate	Votes	%	±%
Labour	Colin Swindell	426	62.6	+32.9
Conservative	Robin Green	255	37.3	−6.7
Majority		171	25.3	
Turnout		681	48.4	
Labour gain from Conservative		Swing		
