= St Andrew's Church, Cubley =

Coordinates: 52°56′11.53″N 1°45′22″W

St Andrew’s Church, Cubley
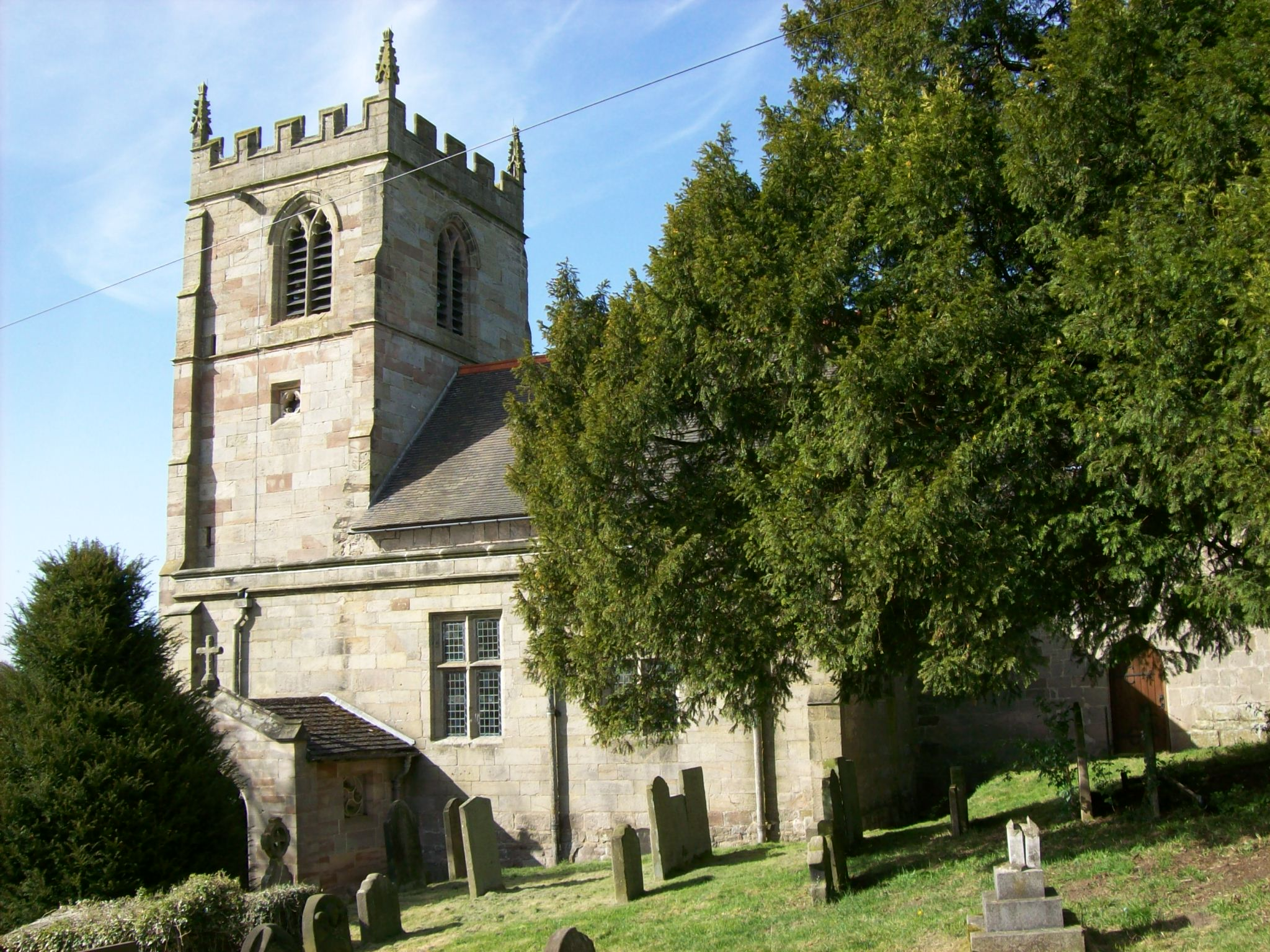
- St Andrew’s Church, Cubley
- St Andrew’s Church, Cubley
- Location: Cubley, Derbyshire
- Country: England
- Denomination: Church of England
- Website: standrewscubley.co.uk

History
- Dedication: St Andrew

Architecture
- Heritage designation: Grade I listed

Administration
- Diocese: Diocese of Derby
- Archdeaconry: Derby
- Deanery: Longford
- Parish: Cubley

St Andrew's Church, Cubley is a Grade I listed parish church in the Church of England in Cubley, Derbyshire.

== History ==
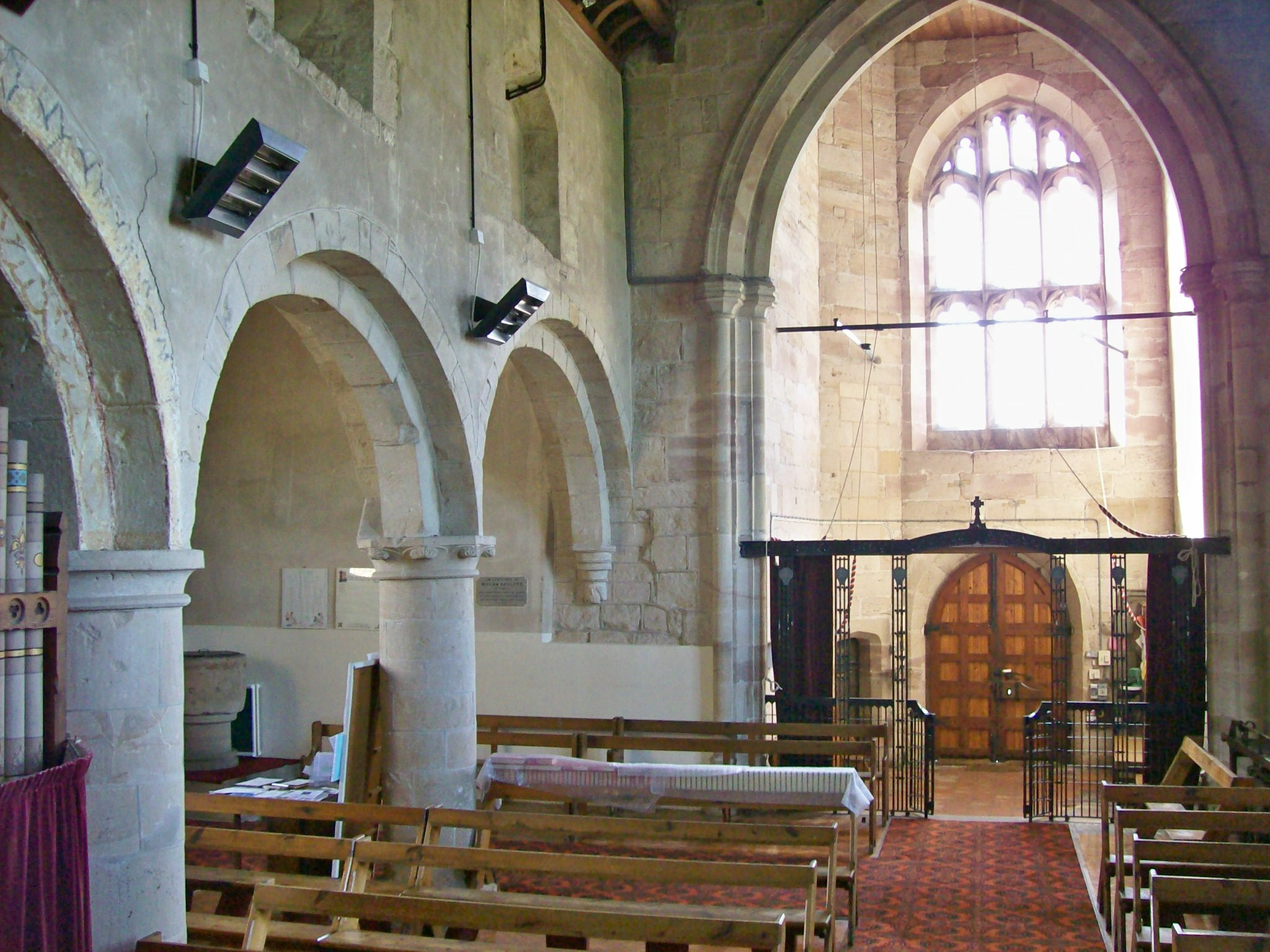
The nave and west end

The church dates from the mid-11th century, with additions in the 12th, and 13th centuries. The west tower was built in the 15th century in a late Perpendicular Gothic style. It has pinnacles and an embattled parapet and is ornamented with thirteen shields of the Montgomery family and its alliances and other sculptured devices.

It comprises a western tower, nave with south aisle, chancel, and south porch. It was restored between 1872 and 1874 by the architect James Piers St Aubyn.

== Parish status ==
The church is in a joint parish with:

- St John's Church, Alkmonton
- St Cuthbert's Church, Doveridge
- St Giles’ Church, Marston Montgomery
- St Paul's Church, Scropton
- St Peter's Church, Somersal Herbert
- All Saints’ Church, Sudbury

== Memorials ==
- Sir Nicholas Montgomery (d. 1494) MP for Derbyshire (UK Parliament constituency) in 1388, 1390 and 1411
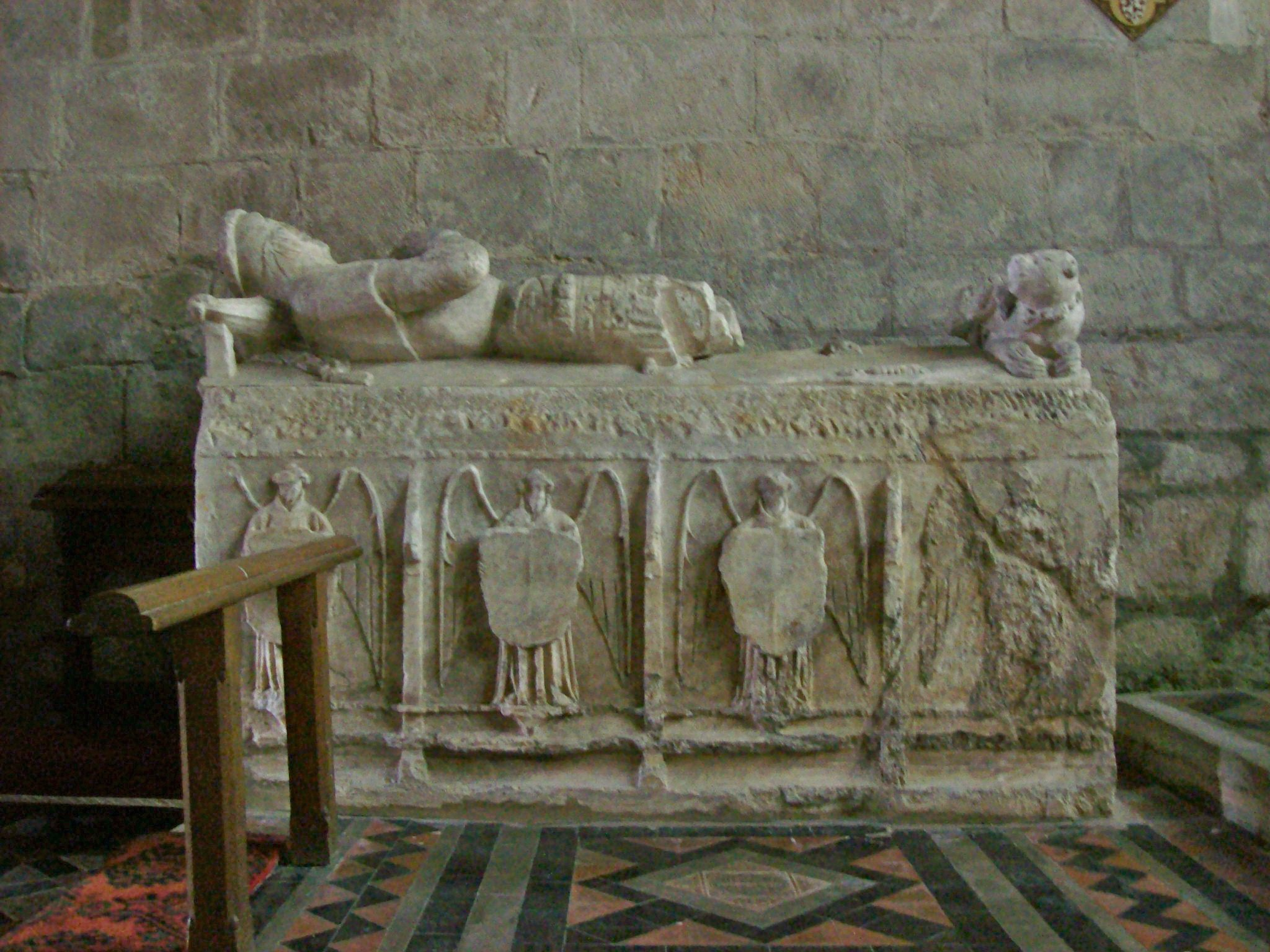
Effigy of Sir Nicholas Montgomery

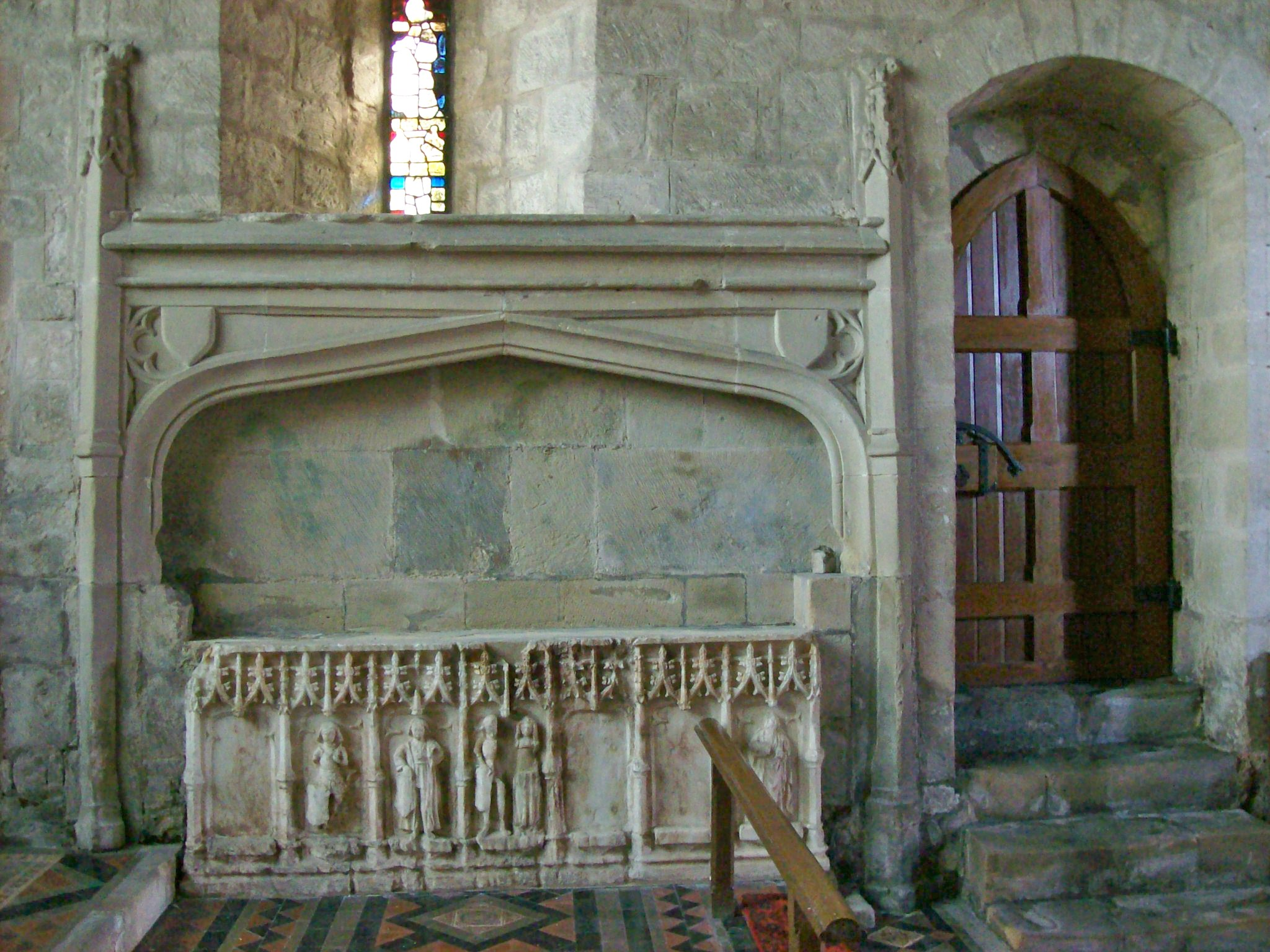
Tomb of the Montgomery family

== Organ ==
The pipe organ was built by Peter Conacher and dates from 1896. A specification of the organ can be found on the National Pipe Organ Register.

== See also ==
- Grade I listed churches in Derbyshire
- Grade I listed buildings in Derbyshire
- Listed buildings in Cubley, Derbyshire
