= John Flower (theologian) =

English nonconformist theologian

- Born: c.1624 Cubley, Derbyshire
- Died: c.1658
- Education: St Peter's College, Oxford
- Occupation: Theologian
- Father: William Flower

John Flower (c.1624 – c.1658) was a nonconformist theologian and the son of William Flower of Cubley, Derbyshire. He became a commoner of New Inn Hall, now St Peter's College, Oxford, in Act term 1640. He became a Bachelor of Arts on the 2 April 1647, and was created M.A. by the parliamentary visitors on 14 April 1648. According to Anthony Wood "he was soon after preacher of God's word at Ilmington in Warwickshire, and afterwards at Staunton in Nottinghamshire, where I find him in 1658."

== Publications ==
1. ' The Free and Honourable Servant, set forth in his Privileges and Prerogatives,' London, 1652.
2. ' Several Quaeries concerning the Church of Jesus Christ upon Earth, briefly explained and resolved,' London, 1658.
