= 2011 Derbyshire Dales District Council election =

2011 UK local government election

Map of the results of the 2011 Derbyshire Dales District Council election, including the delayed election in Stanton. Conservatives in blue, Labour in red, Liberal Democrats in yellow and independents in grey.

The 2011 Derbyshire Dales District Council election took place on 5 May 2011 to elect members of Derbyshire Dales District Council in Derbyshire, England. The whole council was up for election and the Conservative Party stayed in overall control of the council.

== Election result ==
The Conservatives increased their majority on the council after winning 28 seats at the election in May. They gained 4 seats from the Liberal Democrats, more than offsetting losing 1 seat to Labour. This meant Labour went up by one to five seats, while the Liberal Democrats dropped to four, losing half of the seats they had won in 2007, and there remained one independent. Overall turnout at the election was 50.8%.

The Conservatives gained 4 seats from the Liberal Democrats in the wards of Darley Dale, Matlock All Saints and Matlock St Giles. However the Conservatives did lose 1 seat to Labour in Masson, by a 5-vote margin. In total of the 38 seats elected in May, 15 new councillors were elected.

The election in Stanton ward was delayed until 23 June after no candidates were nominated for the seat originally. At the delayed election the Conservatives held the seat and therefore had 29 of the 39 councillors.

Derbyshire Dales local election result 2011
| Party | Seats | Gains | Losses | Net gain/loss | Seats % | Votes % | Votes | +/− |
|---|---|---|---|---|---|---|---|---|
| Conservative | 29 | 4 | 1 | +3 | 74.4 | 48.7 | 21,330 | -0.3 |
| Labour | 5 | 1 | 0 | +1 | 12.8 | 27.8 | 12,176 | +17.9 |
| Liberal Democrats | 4 | 0 | 4 | -4 | 10.3 | 18.1 | 7,903 | -15.9 |
| Independent | 1 | 0 | 0 | 0 | 2.6 | 2.9 | 1,261 | -1.5 |
| Green | 0 | 0 | 0 | 0 | 0.0 | 2.3 | 1,016 | -0.4 |
| UKIP | 0 | 0 | 0 | 0 | 0.0 | 0.2 | 86 | +0.2 |

7 Conservative candidates were unopposed at the election. The above results include the delayed election for Stanton ward.

== Ward results ==
Ashbourne North (2 seats)
| Party | Candidate | Votes | % | ±% |
|---|---|---|---|---|
| Conservative | Stephen Bull | 785 | | |
| Conservative | Tony Millward | 673 | | |
| Labour | Rob Whyman | 407 | | |
| Turnout | | 1,865 | 41.3 | |
| Conservative hold | | Swing | | |
| Conservative hold | | Swing | | |

Ashbourne South (2 seats)
| Party | Candidate | Votes | % | ±% |
|---|---|---|---|---|
| Conservative | Andrew Lewer | 883 | | |
| Conservative | Tom Donnelly | 583 | | |
| Labour | Che Lear Page | 464 | | |
| Turnout | | 1,930 | 40.9 | |
| Conservative hold | | Swing | | |
| Conservative hold | | Swing | | |

Bakewell (3 seats)
| Party | Candidate | Votes | % | ±% |
|---|---|---|---|---|
| Conservative | Judith Twigg | 1,378 | | |
| Conservative | Carol Walker | 1,245 | | |
| Conservative | Philippa Tilbrook | 1,121 | | |
| Labour | Pam Russell | 773 | | |
| Turnout | | 4,517 | 52.1 | +7 |
| Conservative hold | | Swing | | |
| Conservative hold | | Swing | | |
| Conservative hold | | Swing | | |

Bradwell
| Party | Candidate | Votes | % | ±% |
|---|---|---|---|---|
| Conservative | Janet Goodison | 430 | 54.2 | |
| Independent | Christopher Furness | 364 | 45.8 | |
| Majority | | 66 | 8.4 | |
| Turnout | | 794 | 52.5 | |
| Conservative hold | | Swing | | |

Brailsford
| Party | Candidate | Votes | % | ±% |
|---|---|---|---|---|
| Conservative | Angus Jenkins | 517 | 74.1 | |
| Independent | Alan Hodkinson | 181 | 25.9 | |
| Majority | | 336 | 48.2 | |
| Turnout | | 698 | 51.9 | |
| Conservative hold | | Swing | | |

Calver
| Party | Candidate | Votes | % | ±% |
|---|---|---|---|---|
| Conservative | Cate Hunt | unopposed | | |
| Conservative hold | | Swing | | |

Carsington Water
| Party | Candidate | Votes | % | ±% |
|---|---|---|---|---|
| Conservative | Lewis Rose | unopposed | | |
| Conservative hold | | Swing | | |

Chatsworth
| Party | Candidate | Votes | % | ±% |
|---|---|---|---|---|
| Conservative | Michael Longden | unopposed | | |
| Conservative hold | | Swing | | |

Clifton and Bradley
| Party | Candidate | Votes | % | ±% |
|---|---|---|---|---|
| Conservative | Andrew Shirley | 512 | 55.4 | |
| Independent | Ian Bates | 326 | 35.3 | |
| UKIP | Charles Swabey | 86 | 9.3 | |
| Majority | | 186 | 20.1 | |
| Turnout | | 924 | 61.8 | |
| Conservative hold | | Swing | | |

Darley Dale (3 seats)
| Party | Candidate | Votes | % | ±% |
|---|---|---|---|---|
| Liberal Democrats | David Fearn | 731 | | |
| Liberal Democrats | David Burton | 729 | | |
| Conservative | Andrew Statham | 720 | | |
| Liberal Democrats | Nigel Allwood | 694 | | |
| Conservative | Katherine Staves | 688 | | |
| Conservative | Neil MacPherson | 610 | | |
| Labour | Julie Morrison | 578 | | |
| Labour | Finn Page | 554 | | |
| Labour | Phil Rogers | 512 | | |
| Turnout | | 5,816 | 48.6 | +8 |
| Liberal Democrats hold | | Swing | | |
| Liberal Democrats hold | | Swing | | |
| Conservative gain from Liberal Democrats | | Swing | | |

Dovedale and Parwich
| Party | Candidate | Votes | % | ±% |
|---|---|---|---|---|
| Conservative | Richard Fitzherbert | 594 | 76.6 | |
| Labour | Eric Page | 181 | 23.4 | |
| Majority | | 413 | 53.2 | |
| Turnout | | 775 | 55.3 | |
| Conservative hold | | Swing | | |

Doveridge and Sudbury
| Party | Candidate | Votes | % | ±% |
|---|---|---|---|---|
| Conservative | Albert Catt | 660 | 81.7 | +12.9 |
| Labour | Katy Brown | 148 | 18.3 | +18.3 |
| Majority | | 512 | 63.4 | +25.8 |
| Turnout | | 808 | 53.4 | +5 |
| Conservative hold | | Swing | | |

Hartington and Taddington
| Party | Candidate | Votes | % | ±% |
|---|---|---|---|---|
| Conservative | David Chapman | unopposed | | |
| Conservative hold | | Swing | | |

Hathersage and Eyam (2 seats)
| Party | Candidate | Votes | % | ±% |
|---|---|---|---|---|
| Conservative | Jacque Bevan | 962 | | |
| Conservative | Jean Monks | 728 | | |
| Labour | Briony Robinson | 605 | | |
| Labour | Val Robinson | 562 | | |
| Liberal Democrats | David Hoskin | 359 | | |
| Liberal Democrats | Jim Tweeddale | 352 | | |
| Turnout | | 3,568 | 59.7 | +13 |
| Conservative hold | | Swing | | |
| Conservative hold | | Swing | | |

Hulland
| Party | Candidate | Votes | % | ±% |
|---|---|---|---|---|
| Conservative | Richard Bright | unopposed | | |
| Conservative hold | | Swing | | |

Lathkill and Bradford
| Party | Candidate | Votes | % | ±% |
|---|---|---|---|---|
| Independent | David Frederickson | 390 | 52.8 | −13.4 |
| Conservative | Mitch Blythe | 349 | 47.2 | +13.4 |
| Majority | | 41 | 5.5 | −27.0 |
| Turnout | | 739 | 57.4 | +12 |
| Independent hold | | Swing | | |

Litton and Longstone
| Party | Candidate | Votes | % | ±% |
|---|---|---|---|---|
| Conservative | Neil Horton | unopposed | | |
| Conservative hold | | Swing | | |

Masson (2 seats)
| Party | Candidate | Votes | % | ±% |
|---|---|---|---|---|
| Conservative | Garry Purdy | 593 | | |
| Labour | Bob Cartwright | 571 | | |
| Conservative | Peter Hume | 566 | | |
| Labour | Nick Whitehead | 534 | | |
| Turnout | | 2,264 | 50.3 | +10 |
| Conservative hold | | Swing | | |
| Labour gain from Conservative | | Swing | | |

Matlock All Saints (3 seats)
| Party | Candidate | Votes | % | ±% |
|---|---|---|---|---|
| Liberal Democrats | Sue Burfoot | 931 | | |
| Conservative | Geoff Stevens | 808 | | |
| Conservative | Ann Elliott | 796 | | |
| Liberal Democrats | David Barker | 789 | | |
| Conservative | Sam Gregory | 730 | | |
| Liberal Democrats | David Jones | 715 | | |
| Labour | Andrew Botham | 709 | | |
| Turnout | | 5,478 | 50.6 | +5 |
| Liberal Democrats hold | | Swing | | |
| Conservative hold | | Swing | | |
| Conservative gain from Liberal Democrats | | Swing | | |

Matlock St Giles (3 seats)
| Party | Candidate | Votes | % | ±% |
|---|---|---|---|---|
| Liberal Democrats | Steve Flitter | 950 | | |
| Conservative | Barrie Tipping | 716 | | |
| Conservative | Jacquie Stevens | 691 | | |
| Liberal Democrats | Barry Hopkinson | 670 | | |
| Liberal Democrats | Cate Hopkinson | 655 | | |
| Labour | Sally Davies | 632 | | |
| Conservative | Richard Walsh | 604 | | |
| Labour | Simon Peters | 562 | | |
| Turnout | | 5,480 | 48.6 | +6 |
| Liberal Democrats hold | | Swing | | |
| Conservative gain from Liberal Democrats | | Swing | | |
| Conservative gain from Liberal Democrats | | Swing | | |

Norbury
| Party | Candidate | Votes | % | ±% |
|---|---|---|---|---|
| Conservative | Kenneth Bull | unopposed | | |
| Conservative hold | | Swing | | |

Tideswell
| Party | Candidate | Votes | % | ±% |
|---|---|---|---|---|
| Conservative | Jennifer Bower | 338 | 45.7 | −18.8 |
| Liberal Democrats | Sue Barber | 244 | 33.0 | +14.4 |
| Labour | Lytton Page | 157 | 21.2 | +21.2 |
| Majority | | 94 | 12.7 | −34.0 |
| Turnout | | 739 | 49.8 | +14 |
| Conservative hold | | Swing | | |

Winster and South Darley
| Party | Candidate | Votes | % | ±% |
|---|---|---|---|---|
| Labour | Colin Swindell | 690 | 78.7 | +49.1 |
| Conservative | Rebecca Swindell | 187 | 21.3 | −22.9 |
| Majority | | 503 | 57.4 | |
| Turnout | | 877 | 62.6 | +3 |
| Labour hold | | Swing | | |

Wirksworth (3 seats)
| Party | Candidate | Votes | % | ±% |
|---|---|---|---|---|
| Labour | Irene Ratcliffe | 1,293 | | |
| Labour | Peter Slack | 1,048 | | |
| Labour | Mike Ratcliffe | 1,023 | | |
| Conservative | Philip Cope | 626 | | |
| Green | Chris Spencer | 532 | | |
| Conservative | Susan Bull | 517 | | |
| Green | Josh Stockell | 484 | | |
| Conservative | John Smith | 474 | | |
| Turnout | | 5,997 | 49.8 | +9 |
| Labour hold | | Swing | | |
| Labour hold | | Swing | | |
| Labour hold | | Swing | | |

=== Stanton delayed election ===
The election in Stanton was delayed until 23 June 2011 after no candidates originally stood for the seat at the May election. The seat was held for the Conservatives by Joanne Wild with a 73-vote majority.

Stanton
| Party | Candidate | Votes | % | ±% |
|---|---|---|---|---|
| Conservative | Joanne Wild | 246 | 48.9 | −10.7 |
| Labour | Julie Morrison | 173 | 34.4 | +34.4 |
| Liberal Democrats | Anthony Allwood | 84 | 16.7 | −23.7 |
| Majority | | 73 | 14.5 | −4.6 |
| Turnout | | 503 | 34.1 | −5 |
| Conservative hold | | Swing | | |

== By-elections between 2011 and 2015 ==
Chris Furness was elected without opposition on 12 January 2012 to hold Bradwell for the Conservative Party, after having been the losing independent candidate at the 2011 election. The vacancy came after the death of Conservative councillor Janet Goodison in October 2011.

Bradwell by-election 12 January 2012
| Party | Candidate | Votes | % | ±% |
|---|---|---|---|---|
| Conservative | Chris Furness | unopposed | | |
| Conservative hold | | Swing | | |
