= 2023 Derbyshire Dales District Council election =

2023 UK local government election

- 4 May 2023

All 34 seats to Derbyshire Dales District Council 18 seats needed for a majority

	First party	Second party	Third party
Leader	Steve Flitter	Susan Hobson	Mike Ratcliffe (retired)
Party	Liberal Democrats	Conservative	Labour
Last election	8 seats, 23.6%	20 seats, 40.1%	6 seats, 26.2%
Seats won	12	11	6
Seat change	▲4	▼9	Steady
Popular vote	15,653	15,070	9,536
Percentage	34.2%	33.0%	20.9%
Swing	▲10.2%	▼7.1%	▼5.3%
	Fourth party	Fifth party
Leader	Neil Buttle
Party	Green	Independent
Last election	2 seats, 5.3%	3 seats, 3.7%
Seats won	4	1
Seat change	▲2	▼2
Popular vote	2,809	2,491
Percentage	6.1%	5.5%
Swing	▲0.8%	▲1.8%
- Map showing the composition of Derbyshire Dales District Council following the election. Striped wards have mixed representation.
Leader before election
Susan Hobson (acting)
Conservative
No overall control
Leader after election
Steve Flitter
Liberal Democrat
No overall control

The 2023 Derbyshire Dales District Council election was held on 4 May 2023 to elect all 34 councillors for Derbyshire Dales District Council. This was on the same day as other local elections.

For the first time since 1995, the Conservative Party failed to win a majority of seats. Instead, the Liberal Democrats won the largest number of seats, beating the Conservatives by one seat, the same margin as in 1995, but again failing to win a majority of their own.

This was the first election to the Derbyshire Dales District Council to be held under the current ward boundaries. The total number of councillors was reduced from 39 to 34, and the total number of wards was reduced from 25 to 21. Consequently, the boundaries of most of the wards were different compared to those which had been in use since the 2003 election. The arrangements for each new ward are described below.

Prior to the election the council was under no overall control, with the majority held by the Conservatives following the 2019 election having been lost through defections and resignations. Less than two months before the election the Conservative leader, Garry Purdy, who had led the council since 2019, was suspended and then resigned over private promises made to a local tourist attraction. Susan Hobson took over as Conservative leader and became acting leader of the council, with formal appointment of a new leader of the council deferred until after the election. Immediately before the election the council was being run by a coalition comprising the Conservatives, the SDP councillor and three of the independent councillors.

A "progressive alliance" coalition of the Liberal Democrats, Labour and Greens subsequently formed to take control of the council, with Liberal Democrat group leader Steve Flitter being appointed leader of the council at the annual council meeting on 25 May 2023.

== Ward results ==
In the instance in which the boundaries of a ward are identical to those in the 2019 election, the percentage changes have been calculated relative to the results in that ward from 2019. In the instance in which a ward is broadly coterminous with a previous ward or has only been slightly expanded, the percentage change is calculated in the same way from the corresponding ward in 2019, but in these instances this value is only indicative and some changes to party political support will be a result of the boundary changes. The results in each ward were as follows:

=== Ashbourne North ===
Ashbourne North was still represented by two councillors and was slightly expanded.

Ashbourne North (2 Seats)
Party	Candidate	Votes	%	±%
Liberal Democrats	Peter Dobbs	653	46.9	▲16.6
Conservative	Stuart Lees	575	41.3	▼6.8
Conservative	Sue Bull	561	40.3	▼8.2
Liberal Democrats	Monty Stuart-Monteith	528	37.9	▲13.3
Labour	Eileen Ashley	246	17.7	▼0.8
Majority		14	0.5	
Turnout		1,393	41	
Liberal Democrats gain from Conservative		Swing	▲12.0	
Conservative hold		Swing		

=== Ashbourne South ===
Ashbourne South was now represented by three councillors instead of two and was expanded.

Ashbourne South (3 Seats)
Party	Candidate	Votes	%	±%
Liberal Democrats	Rob Archer	1,101	52.5	▲13.5
Liberal Democrats	Nick Wilton	884	42.1	New
Conservative	Anthony Bates	857	40.8	▼2.5
Conservative	Tom Donnelly	820	39.1	▲1.7
Liberal Democrats	Robin Shirtcliffe	794	37.8	▲5.4
Conservative	Matthew Taylor	697	33.2	New
Labour	Matt Ginnis	453	21.6	▲9.9
Majority		37	0.7	
Turnout		2,099	39	
Liberal Democrats hold		Swing	▲6.2	
Liberal Democrats gain from Conservative		Swing		
Conservative win				

=== Bakewell ===
Bakewell was now represented by two councillors instead of three but remained geographically the same.

Bakewell (2 Seats)
Party	Candidate	Votes	%	±%
Conservative	Mark Wakeman	1,011	61.2	▼5.8
Conservative	Gareth Gee	581	35.2	▼31.2
Labour	Ben Carter	526	31.9	▲1.5
Green	Nicola Peltell	307	18.6	New
Liberal Democrats	Robert Court	178	10.8	New
Independent	Rachel Elnaugh-Love	175	10.6	New
Liberal Democrats	Patricia Wildgoose	166	10.1	New
Majority		55	1.9	
Turnout		1,651	47	
Conservative hold		Swing	▼9.2	
Conservative hold		Swing		

=== Bonsall and Winster ===
Bonsall and Winster was a new ward which was to be represented by one councillor. It was broadly coterminous with the old ward of Winster and South Darley, which was also represented by one councillor.

Bonsall & Winster (1 Seat)
Party	Candidate	Votes	%	±%
Green	Matthew Buckler	578	69.4	New
Conservative	Chris Stait	255	30.6	New
Majority		323	38.8	
Turnout		833	44	
Green gain from Independent		Swing	▲83.3	

=== Bradwell ===
Bradwell was still represented by one councillor and was slightly expanded.

Bradwell (1 Seat)
Party	Candidate	Votes	%	±%
Labour	Andy Nash	506	73.8	▲31.2
Conservative	Chloe Sinker	180	26.2	▼31.2
Majority		326	47.5	
Turnout		686	44	
Labour gain from Conservative		Swing	▲31.2	

=== Brailsford ===
Brailsford was still represented by one councillor and was geographically the same.

Brailsford (1 Seat)
Party	Candidate	Votes	%	±%
Conservative	Geoff Bond	379	57.3	▼22.6
Green	Morgan Bryan	117	17.7	New
Labour	Fraser McGuire	100	15.1	▼5.0
Liberal Democrats	Midge Dobbs	66	10.0	New
Majority		262	39.6	
Turnout		662	39	
Conservative hold		Swing	▼20.2	

=== Calver and Longstone ===
Calver and Longstone was a new ward which is to be represented by one councillor. It was predominantly formed of parishes from the old wards of Calver, and Litton and Longstone.

Calver & Longstone (1 Seat)
Party	Candidate	Votes	%	±%
Green	Kelda Boothroyd	441	54.6	
Conservative	Helen Froggatt	367	45.4	
Majority		74	9.2	
Turnout		808	45	
Green win				

=== Chatsworth ===
Chatsworth was still represented by one councillor and was slightly expanded.

Chatsworth (1 Seat)
Party	Candidate	Votes	%	±%
Conservative	Susan Hobson	458	62.0	▼12.0
Liberal Democrats	Claire Cadogan	170	23.0	▲6.8
Green	John Ward	111	15.0	New
Majority		288	39.0	
Turnout		739	43	
Conservative hold		Swing	▼9.4	

=== Cromford and Matlock Bath ===
Cromford and Matlock Bath was a new ward which is to be represented by one councillor. It was predominantly formed of parishes from the old ward of Masson.

Cromford & Matlock Bath (1 Seat)
Party	Candidate	Votes	%	±%
Labour	Nick Whitehead	448	68.8	
Conservative	Joseph Pearce	203	31.2	
Majority		245	37.6	
Turnout		651	39	
Labour win				

=== Darley Dale ===
Darley Dale was still represented by three councillors and was slightly expanded.

Darley Dale (3 Seats)
Party	Candidate	Votes	%	±%
Liberal Democrats	David Burton	1,104	54.7	▲29.9
Liberal Democrats	Marilyn Franks	917	45.4	▲23.8
Liberal Democrats	Rodger Shelley	761	37.7	▲23.8
Conservative	Ann Elliott	642	31.8	▼11.7
Conservative	Dave Oakley	609	30.1	▼9.4
Labour	Sarah Halliwell	555	27.5	▲8.8
Conservative	Richard Walsh	461	22.8	▼14.8
Independent	Andrew Statham	291	14.4	New
Majority		119	2.2	
Turnout		2,020	42	
Liberal Democrats gain from Conservative		Swing	▲21.3	
Liberal Democrats gain from Conservative		Swing		
Liberal Democrats gain from Conservative		Swing		

=== Dovedale, Parwich and Brassington ===
Dovedale, Parwich and Brassington was a new ward which was to be represented by one councillor. It was broadly coterminous with the old ward of Dovedale and Parwich, which was also represented by one councillor.

Dovedale, Parwich & Brassington (1 Seat)
Party	Candidate	Votes	%	±%
Conservative	Nigel Walker	464	57.8	▼15.9
Labour	Kevin Welsh	120	14.9	▲2.2
Green	Richard Rowlatt	119	14.8	New
Liberal Democrats	Henry Jebb	100	12.5	▼1.1
Majority		344	42.8	
Turnout		803	44	
Conservative hold		Swing	▼9.1	

=== Doveridge and Sudbury ===
Doveridge and Sudbury was still represented by one councillor and was geographically the same.

Doveridge & Sudbury (1 Seat)
Party	Candidate	Votes	%	±%
Conservative	John Bointon	458	58.0	▲20.7
Independent	Jacqueline Allison	331	42.0	▼11.8
Majority				
Turnout		789	44	
Conservative gain from Independent		Swing	▲16.3	

=== Hartington and Taddington ===
Hartington and Taddington was still represented by one councillor and was slightly expanded.

Hartington & Taddington (1 Seat)
Party	Candidate	Votes	%	±%
Conservative	David Chapman	391	62.7	▲2.9
Liberal Democrats	Eleanor Nancolas	117	18.8	▲6.2
Green	Catherine Handy	116	18.6	▲1.6
Majority		274	43.9	
Turnout		624	37	
Conservative hold		Swing	▼1.7	

=== Hathersage ===
Hathersage was a new ward which was to be represented by two councillors. It is broadly coterminous with the old ward of Hathersage and Eyam, which was also represented by two councillors.

Hathersage (2 Seats)
Party	Candidate	Votes	%	±%
Independent	Peter O'Brien	1,387	76.0	▲34.7
Labour	Simon Ripton	1,092	59.8	▲20.9
Conservative	Jason Atkin	420	23.0	▼15.6
Conservative	Steve Bull	335	18.4	▼15.4
Majority		672	20.8	
Turnout		1,825	53	
Independent gain from Labour		Swing	▲26.6	
Labour hold		Swing		

=== Hulland ===
Hulland was still represented by one councillor and was slightly redrawn.

Hulland (1 Seat)
Party	Candidate	Votes	%	±%
Conservative	Dermot Murphy	395	51.4	▼28.8
Labour	Diane Fletcher	148	19.3	▼0.5
SDP	Richard Bright	145	18.9	New
Liberal Democrats	Barbara Bowman	80	10.4	New
Majority		247	32.1	
Turnout		768	44	
Conservative hold		Swing	▼14.2	

=== Matlock East and Tansley ===
Matlock East and Tansley was a new ward which was to be represented by three councillors. It was broadly coterminous with the old ward of Matlock St. Giles, which was also represented by three councillors.

Matlock East and Tansley (3 Seats)
Party	Candidate	Votes	%	±%
Liberal Democrats	Stephen Flitter	1,215	67.7	▲14.7
Liberal Democrats	Joanne Linthwaite	1,083	60.4	▲16.2
Liberal Democrats	David Hughes	1,074	59.9	▲19.9
Labour	Suqie Banwait	477	26.6	▲5.3
Conservative	Danny Hopkinson	476	26.5	▼1.6
Majority		597	13.8	
Turnout		1,794	39	
Liberal Democrats hold		Swing	▲20.0	
Liberal Democrats hold		Swing		
Liberal Democrats hold		Swing		

=== Matlock West ===
Matlock West was a new ward which was to be represented by three councillors. It was broadly coterminous with the old ward of Matlock All Saints, which was also represented by three councillors.

Matlock West (3 Seats)
Party	Candidate	Votes	%	±%
Liberal Democrats	Sue Burfoot	1,665	78.6	▲9.9
Liberal Democrats	Martin Burfoot	1,526	72.0	▲10.0
Liberal Democrats	Steve Wain	1,471	69.5	▲14.0
Labour	John Weir	422	19.9	▲1.7
Conservative	Rosemary Oakley	323	15.3	▼10.5
Conservative	Thomas Pearce	263	12.4	▼3.5
Conservative	Harvey Griffin	258	12.2	New
Majority		1,049	17.7	
Turnout		2,118	46	
Liberal Democrats hold		Swing	▲4.6	
Liberal Democrats hold		Swing		
Liberal Democrats hold		Swing		

=== Norbury ===
Norbury was still represented by one councillor and was slightly expanded.

Norbury (1 Seat)
Party	Candidate	Votes	%	±%
Conservative	Tony Morley	492	67.3	▼15.6
Labour	David Walker	123	16.8	▼0.3
Green	John Hill	116	15.9	New
Majority		369	50.5	
Turnout		731	40	
Conservative hold		Swing	▼7.7	

=== Tideswell ===
Tideswell was still represented by one councillor and was slightly expanded.

Tideswell (1 Seat)
Party	Candidate	Votes	%	±%
Green	Neil Buttle	514	66.5	▲24.4
Conservative	Harry Shirt	259	33.5	▼1.0
Majority		255	33.0	
Turnout		773	42	
Green hold		Swing	▲12.7	

=== Wirksworth ===
Wirksworth was still represented by three councillors and was slightly expanded.

Wirksworth (3 Seats)
Party	Candidate	Votes	%	±%
Labour	Pete Slack	1,491	69.9	▲13.8
Labour	Dawn Greatorex	1,454	68.2	▲8.6
Labour	Lucy Peacock	1,375	64.5	▲10.4
Conservative	Steven Kennel	567	26.6	▼2.7
Conservative	Paul Williamson	559	26.2	▲2.3
Conservative	Tony Britner	554	26.0	New
Majority		808	13.5	
Turnout		2,132	44	
Labour hold		Swing	▼0.5	
Labour hold		Swing		
Labour hold		Swing		

=== Youlgrave ===
Youlgrave was a new ward which was to be represented by one councillor. It was broadly coterminous with the old ward of Lathkill and Bradford, which was also represented by one councillor.

Youlgrave (1 Seat)
Party	Candidate	Votes	%	±%
Green	Laura Mellstrom	390	43.5	New
Independent	Thomas Elliott	307	34.2	▼51.8
Conservative	John Pearce	200	22.3	New
Majority		83	9.3	
Turnout		897	50	
Green gain from Independent		Swing	▲47.7	

== By-elections ==
=== Bakewell ===
Bakewell: 22 February 2024
Party	Candidate	Votes	%	±%
Labour	Bob Butcher	467	37.7	+13.7
Conservative	Richard Walsh	452	36.5	−9.5
Liberal Democrats	Claire Cadogan	161	13.0	+4.9
Green	Nicola Peltell	73	5.9	−8.1
Reform	Lesley Crosby	50	4.0	New
Independent	Rachel Elnaugh-Love	36	2.9	−5.1
Majority		15	1.2	
Turnout		1,239	35	−12
Labour gain from Conservative		Swing		

=== Norbury ===
Norbury: 22 February 2024
Party	Candidate	Votes	%	±%
Conservative	Sue Bull	317	63.1	−4.2
Labour	Bob Allen	75	14.9	−1.9
Green	John Hill	65	12.9	−2.9
Liberal Democrats	Robin Shirtcliffe	45	9.0	New
Majority		242	48.2	
Turnout		502	27	−13
Conservative hold		Swing		

=== Calver & Longstone ===
Calver & Longstone: 14 November 2024
Party	Candidate	Votes	%	±%
Conservative	Helen Froggatt	290	47.6	+2.2
Green	Sheelagh Handy	263	43.2	−11.4
Labour	Pam Ashley	56	9.2	New
Majority		27	4.4	
Turnout		609		
Conservative gain from Green		Swing		
