= 2003 Derbyshire Dales District Council election =

2003 UK local government election

Map of the results of the 2003 Derbyshire Dales District Council election. Conservatives in blue, Liberal Democrats in yellow, Labour in red and independents in grey.

The 2003 Derbyshire Dales District Council election took place on 1 May 2003 to elect members of Derbyshire Dales District Council in Derbyshire, England. The whole council was up for election with boundary changes since the last election in 1999. The Conservative Party stayed in overall control of the council.

== Background ==
Before the election the Conservatives had a majority on the council with 21 seats, compared to 9 for the Liberal Democrats, 6 for Labour and 3 independents.

Issues at the election included housing, with the Conservatives saying they would make more land available, council tax, where the Liberal Democrats attacked the Conservatives for a 19.9% increase, and waste collection, with Labour objecting to the end of large waste collection, which they said had led to fly tipping. The Liberal Democrats said they were targeting seats in the villages of Baslow and Taddington, while Labour said they were aiming for Darley Dale. However the Conservatives were guaranteed seats after the election, as 13 of their candidates faced no opposition, the highest number of any council in the country.

== Election result ==
The Conservatives gained 3 seats to increase their majority on the council with 24 councillors, after gaining seats from independents in Bakewell ward. The Liberal Democrats remained on 9 seats, while Labour finished with 5 seats and 1 independent was elected. Turnout at the election varied between a high of 52% and a low of 24%, but was down on the 1999 election.

Derbyshire Dales local election result 2003
Party	Seats	Gains	Losses	Net gain/loss	Seats %	Votes %	Votes	+/−
Conservative	24			+3	61.5	42.5	13,153	
Liberal Democrats	9			0	23.1	35.7	11,058	
Labour	5			-1	12.8	14.3	4,438	
Independent	1			-2	2.6	7.5	2,310	

== Ward results ==
Ashbourne North (2 seats)
Party	Candidate	Votes	%	±%
Conservative	Frederick Elliott	unopposed		
Conservative	Anthony Millward	unopposed		

Ashbourne South (2 seats)
Party	Candidate	Votes	%	±%
Conservative	Andrew Lewer	517		
Conservative	Alan Hodkinson	487		
Labour	Che Lear Page	210		
Labour	Lytton Page	165		
Turnout		1,379	24.0	

Bakewell (3 seats)
Party	Candidate	Votes	%	±%
Conservative	Judith Twigg	1,042		
Conservative	Carol Walker	810		
Conservative	John Pearce	786		
Independent	John Brighton	531		
Independent	Hilary Young	452		
Liberal Democrats	Maureen Smith	376		
Liberal Democrats	Helen Pocock	351		
Independent	Trevor Smith	332		
Liberal Democrats	Joyce Steele	298		
Labour	Stephen Pope	162		
Turnout		5,140	46.4	

Bradwell
Party	Candidate	Votes	%	±%
Conservative	Janet Goodison	unopposed		

Brailsford
Party	Candidate	Votes	%	±%
Conservative	Carol Valentine	unopposed		

Calver
Party	Candidate	Votes	%	±%
Conservative	Catherine Hunt	575	72.2	
Liberal Democrats	Shirley Holt	221	27.8	
Majority		354	44.4	
Turnout		796	49.5	

Carsington Water
Party	Candidate	Votes	%	±%
Conservative	Lewis Rose	468	77.7	
Liberal Democrats	Julia Pulman	134	22.3	
Majority		334	55.4	
Turnout		602	40.2	

Chatsworth
Party	Candidate	Votes	%	±%
Conservative	Michael Longden	unopposed		

Clifton & Bradley
Party	Candidate	Votes	%	±%
Conservative	Ian Bates	unopposed		

Darley Dale (3 seats)
Party	Candidate	Votes	%	±%
Liberal Democrats	David Burton	1,051		
Liberal Democrats	David Fearn	1,014		
Liberal Democrats	Sandra Fearn	989		
Conservative	John Wall	396		
Conservative	Howard Simpson-Birks	395		
Conservative	Terence Kilburn	344		
Labour	Fionntann Page	184		
Turnout		4,373	37.8	

Dovedale and Parwich
Party	Candidate	Votes	%	±%
Conservative	Simon Spencer	441	77.1	
Labour	Eric Page	131	22.9	
Majority		310	54.2	
Turnout		572	46.0	

Doveridge and Sudbury
Party	Candidate	Votes	%	±%
Conservative	Charles Brindley	unopposed		

Hartington & Taddington
Party	Candidate	Votes	%	±%
Conservative	David Chapman	364	74.0	
Liberal Democrats	Eleanor Nancolas	128	26.0	
Majority		236	48.0	
Turnout		492	38.1	

Hathersage and Eyam (2 seats)
Party	Candidate	Votes	%	±%
Conservative	Jacqueline Bevan	unopposed		
Conservative	David Hoskin	unopposed		

Hulland
Party	Candidate	Votes	%	±%
Conservative	Jennifer Radford	unopposed		

Lathkill and Bradford
Party	Candidate	Votes	%	±%
Independent	William Moore	320	52.2	
Conservative	Andrew Howard	293	47.8	
Majority		27	4.4	
Turnout		613	45.4	

Lutton and Longstone
Party	Candidate	Votes	%	±%
Conservative	Robert Otter	unopposed		

Masson (2 seats)
Party	Candidate	Votes	%	±%
Labour	John March	395		
Labour	Nicholas Elliott	328		
Liberal Democrats	Barbara Bowman	248		
Conservative	Joanna Cochrane	237		
Liberal Democrats	Janet Beckett	236		
Conservative	Vivienne Smith	230		
Turnout		1,674	33.2	

Matlock All Saints (3 seats)
Party	Candidate	Votes	%	±%
Liberal Democrats	David Barker	914		
Liberal Democrats	Martin Burfoot	897		
Conservative	Geoffrey Stevens	867		
Liberal Democrats	Martyn Moss	766		
Conservative	Melvyn Askew	566		
Conservative	John Smith	541		
Independent	Ann Elliott	413		
Independent	Jacqueline Power	262		
Turnout		5,226	43.2	

Matlock St. Giles (3 seats)
Party	Candidate	Votes	%	±%
Liberal Democrats	Stephen Flitter	1,035		
Liberal Democrats	Anthony Allwood	913		
Liberal Democrats	Ursula Lunn	815		
Conservative	Diana Dakin	703		
Conservative	Jacqueline Stevens	692		
Conservative	Barrie Tipping	665		
Labour	Tane Page	229		
Turnout		5,052	41.8	

Norbury
Party	Candidate	Votes	%	±%
Conservative	Kenneth Bull	unopposed		

Stanton
Party	Candidate	Votes	%	±%
Conservative	Deborah Read	unopposed		

Tideswell
Party	Candidate	Votes	%	±%
Conservative	Tracy Critchlow	282	50.9	
Liberal Democrats	Susan Barber	272	49.1	
Majority		10	1.8	
Turnout		554	36.9	

Winster & South Darley
Party	Candidate	Votes	%	±%
Liberal Democrats	Raymond Dring	400	64.6	
Conservative	Jean Wall	128	20.7	
Labour	Paul Tozer	91	14.7	
Majority		272	43.9	
Turnout		619	52.0	

Wirksworth (3 seats)
Party	Candidate	Votes	%	±%
Labour	Irene Ratcliffe	901		
Labour	James Ratcliffe	822		
Labour	Peter Slack	820		
Conservative	Kevin Hall	468		
Conservative	Gladwyn Gratton	452		
Conservative	Lesley Hall	405		
Turnout		3,868	31.2	

== By-elections between 2003 and 2007 ==
=== All Saints Matlock ===
A by-election in All Saints Matlock was held on 27 November 2003 after the Liberal Democrat councillor Martin Burfoot was forced to resign after complaints of a conflict of interest due to his holding a position on the Peak District National Park Authority. His wife Sue Burfoot held the seat for the Liberal Democrats.

All Saints Matlock by-election 27 November 2003
Party	Candidate	Votes	%	±%
Liberal Democrats	Sue Burfoot	678	54.0	+16.8
Conservative	Jacquie Stevens	578	46.0	+10.7
Majority		100	8.0	
Turnout		1,256	29.0	
Liberal Democrats hold		Swing		

=== Litton and Longstone ===
Litton and Longstone by-election 31 March 2005
Party	Candidate	Votes	%	±%
Conservative		338	66.0	
Liberal Democrats	Sue Barber	174	34.0	
Majority		164	32.0	
Turnout		512	36.0	
Conservative hold		Swing		

=== Winster & South Darley ===
Winster & South Darley by-election 20 April 2006
Party	Candidate	Votes	%	±%
Conservative	Edward Moseley	316	40.8	+20.1
Liberal Democrats	George Edwards	281	36.2	−28.4
Labour		178	23.0	+8.3
Majority		35	4.6	
Turnout		775		
Conservative gain from Liberal Democrats		Swing		

=== Lathkill & Bradford ===
Lathkill & Bradford by-election 11 May 2006
Party	Candidate	Votes	%	±%
Independent		unopposed		
Independent hold		Swing		
