= Doveridge =

Village in Derbyshire, England

Coordinates: 52.9042°N 1.8244°W

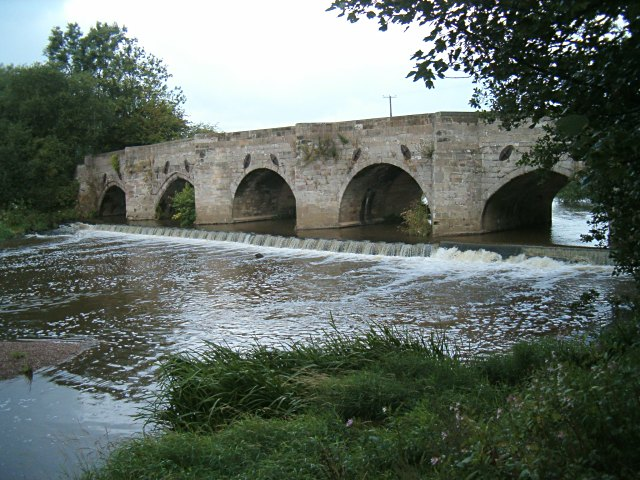
- Dove Bridge Now by-passed by the A50 dual carriageway and a new crossing just downstream.

- Location within Derbyshire
- Population: 1,622 (2011)
- Civil parish: Doveridge
- District: Derbyshire Dales
- Shire county: Derbyshire
- Region: East Midlands
- Country: England
- Sovereign state: United Kingdom
- Post town: ASHBOURNE
- Postcode district: DE6
- Dialling code: 01889
- Police: Derbyshire
- Fire: Derbyshire
- Ambulance: East Midlands
- UK Parliament: Derbyshire Dales

Doveridge is a village and civil parish in Derbyshire, United Kingdom, near the border with Staffordshire and about 2 km (1.2 mi) east of Uttoxeter. Its name may come from its having a bridge over the river Dove (i.e. Dove(B)ridge), a tributary of the River Trent. The civil parish population (including Oaks Green) as taken at the 2011 Census was 1,622.

Doveridge has a pub, the "Cavendish Arms", and a working men's club. The village also has a football team and a cricket team, both quite successful in their local leagues.

== History ==
Doveridge was recorded in the Domesday Book, under the old English name "Dubbige", as belonging to Henry de Ferrers and being worth one hundred shillings.

According to legend, Robin Hood and Maid Marian were married under the old yew tree in the churchyard of St Cuthbert's Church in the village. The church is over 900 years old and has an historic peal of bells.

Doveridge Hall, designed in the neoclassical style and completed in 1769, was the seat of Sir Henry Cavendish, 1st Baronet; it was demolished in 1938. This branch of the Cavendish family holds the title of Baron Waterpark.

The A50 from Derby to Stoke-on-Trent used to run through the village. In the 1960s it was planned to widen this road, and Cavendish Lodge, a splendid 16 room, 17th century hunting lodge, belonging to the Lewis family, was demolished. Shortly afterwards the road widening plan was dropped; however a by-pass was built in 1998 to the north of the village.

== Governance ==
The village has its own civil parish.

Doveridge is part of the Doveridge and Sudbury ward in Derbyshire Dales District Council and is represented by Jacqueline Allison, an Independent who won this normally safe Conservative seat in 2019 election.

Doveridge is part of the Derbyshire Dales constituency.

== Transport ==
The A50 runs to the north of the village and is the main way into the village.

Doveridge has 5 bus Stops and is served by routes 1 and 1E.

The Nearest Railway station is Uttoxeter.

The nearest airport is East Midlands.

== Media ==
The local newspapers covering the area are the Uttoxeter Advertiser and the Uttoxeter Post and Times.

The BBC local radio station is BBC Radio Derby and the local independent station is Capital East Midlands.

Doveridge is covered by the Central ITV and BBC East Midlands TV regions.

== See also ==
- Listed buildings in Doveridge
