= 1999 Derbyshire Dales District Council election =

1999 UK local government election

The 1999 Derbyshire Dales District Council election took place on 6 May 1999 to elect members of Derbyshire Dales District Council in Derbyshire, England. The whole council was up for election and the Conservative party gained overall control of the council from no overall control.

== Election result ==
Derbyshire Dales local election result 1999
Party	Seats	Gains	Losses	Net gain/loss	Seats %	Votes %	Votes	+/−
Conservative	21			+5	53.8			
Liberal Democrats	9			-7	23.1			
Labour	5			-2	12.8			
Independent	4			+4	10.3			

== By-elections between 1999 and 2003 ==
=== Calver ===
Calver by-election 12 October 2000
Party	Candidate	Votes	%	±%
Conservative		362	70.6	+16.7
Liberal Democrats		151	29.4	−5.8
Majority		211	41.2	
Turnout		513	45.0	
Conservative hold		Swing		

=== Taddington ===
Taddington by-election 7 March 2002
Party	Candidate	Votes	%	±%
Conservative		322	73.2	+4.8
Liberal Democrats		118	26.8	+16.2
Majority		204	46.4	
Turnout		440	34.3	
Conservative hold		Swing		
