= Hollington, Derbyshire =

Village in Derbyshire, England

Coordinates: 52.956°N 1.661°W

Hollington
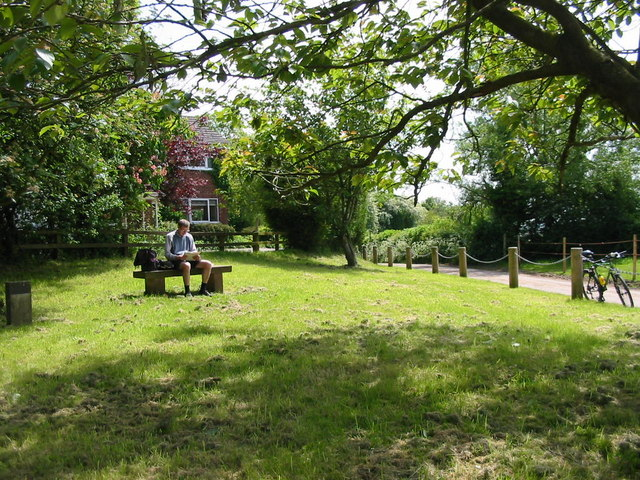
- Hollington Village Green

- Location within Derbyshire
- Population: 212
- Civil parish: Hollington
- District: Derbyshire Dales
- Shire county: Derbyshire
- Region: East Midlands
- Country: England
- Sovereign state: United Kingdom
- Post town: ASHBOURNE
- Postcode district: DE6
- Dialling code: 01889
- Police: Derbyshire
- Fire: Derbyshire
- Ambulance: East Midlands

Hollington is a village and civil parish in the Derbyshire Dales district, near the town of Uttoxeter and 5.5 miles (8.9 km) from the city of Derby, in the English county of Derbyshire. In the most recent census (2001) Hollington had a population of 212. There are only a few buildings in Hollington of note such as the Red Lion pub to serve the small population. Hollington does have a building of historical importance, a 500-year-old wooden framed house named Lodge Farm; this building currently is a grade II listed building.

Hollington parish

== Location and land use ==
At last count the village had 84 households with the average house containing over 7 rooms in total. The vast majority of the houses are either detached or bungalows, which is to be expected of a country parish of this size. The other land uses involve mainly agricultural land, though there used to be a Church of England school and a church in the parish. They have both been closed and the church was converted into a house and privately sold.

== Population ==
The population in Hollington is currently recorded in the census along with other nearby settlements; as a result it is hard to determine the current total population. During the last census that Hollington was individually analysed in 1961 it was at 164 people; much lower than roughly 90 years before, when it was at 261. Of the 212 people currently living in Hollington 149 are between 16 and 74 and of those people 95 people are economically active 28 are in the manufacturing industry and 72 are in the service industry, likely working in the nearby towns and cities.

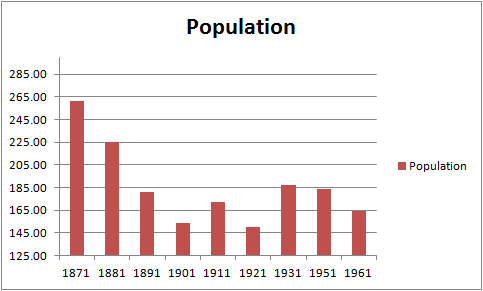

== Farming ==
Hollington was recorded in the Domesday Book in 1086 as Holintune, meaning in old English, the farmstead where holly grows. This along with other historical references has shown that the parish has mostly always been an agricultural village. The area is known for having high quality soil known as keuper marl, which is considered effective for farming and milk production.

Modern farming in the area has changed considerably in recent years compared to the past, for example half way through the 20th century there were as many as 18 farms in Hollington all working on a small scale with only a few animals, but now there are very few farms, much larger in size.

This is because as the old farmers retired, their farmland was purchased by larger companies and combined with their own land to create even larger farms. Also a major handicap on large scale farming was removed in the 1950s when piped water was made available where as before the only water supply was pumped up by hand. This made it easier to water large scale farms and to take care of more animals than was possible before.

== Hollington Chapel ==
In the past there was very little available to the people in terms of services; one of the main buildings most parishes would have wanted in the past would have been a church, but the chapel in Hollington was not built until 1847. Records show that the church in the nearby village of Longford was used by people in Hollington. Records show that the chapel in Hollington was very well attended for many years and the location of many of the parishes’ events such as a harvest festival; it was then closed in 1992 and sold and converted into a home in 1995.

== Hollington millennium committee ==
The Hollington millennium committee was formed in 1999 in order to organise the millennium celebration, but after the success of the celebration the committee continued to operate, setting up many more events, including fundraisers for the queen’s golden Jubilee party in 2002. The fundraisers have also been used in order to restore the village greens, plant trees and more. Though in current years lack of support from the locals has made it so the committee has had to struggle with poor turnouts.

== See also ==
- Listed buildings in Hollington, Derbyshire
