= Derbyshire Dales =

Coordinates: 53.05°N 1.70°W

Derbyshire Dales District
- Non-metropolitan district
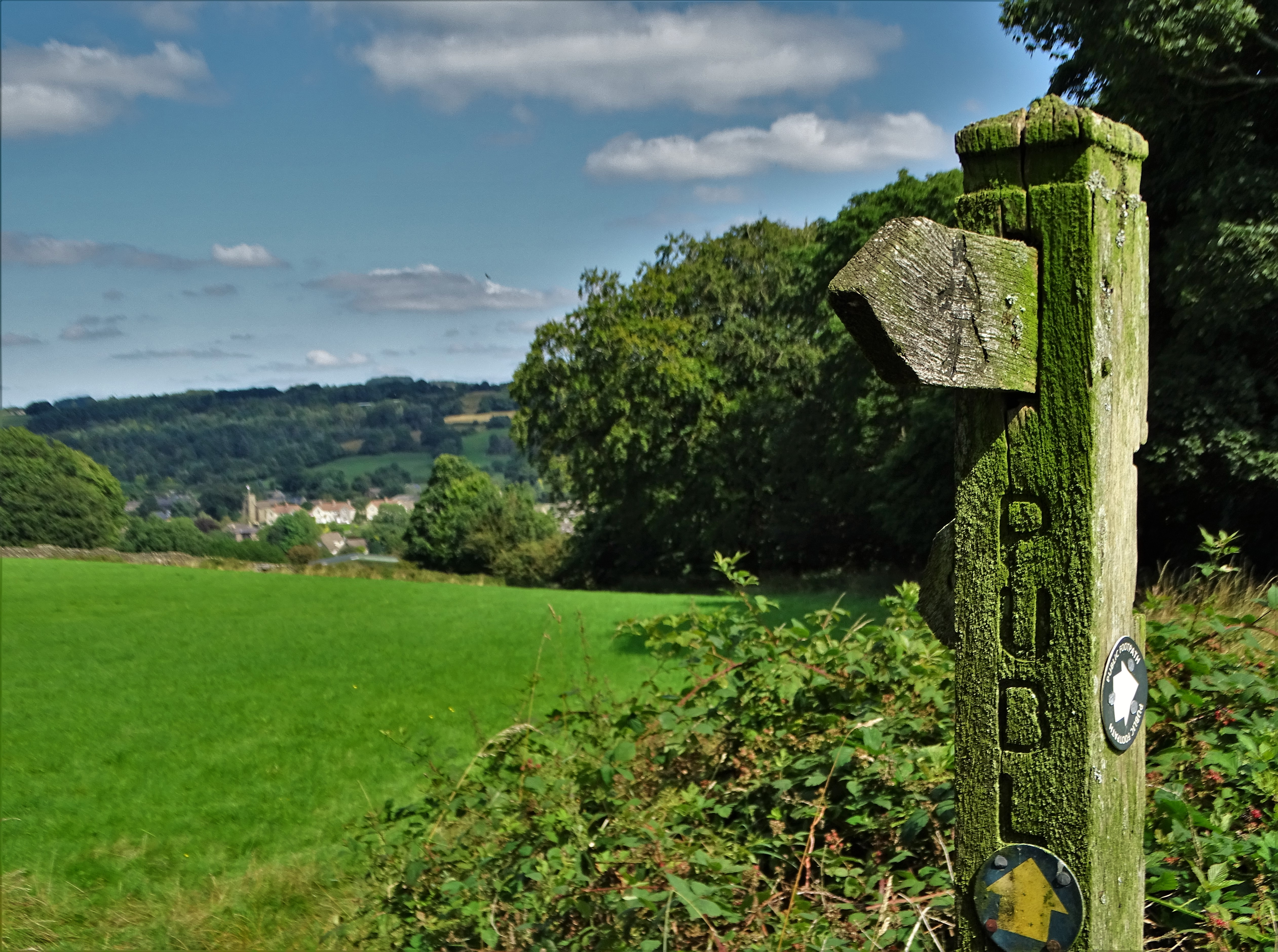
- View of Tansley.

- Shown within Derbyshire
- Sovereign state: United Kingdom
- Constituent country: England
- Region: East Midlands
- Administrative county: Derbyshire
- Admin. HQ: Matlock

Government
  - Type: Derbyshire Dales District Council
  - MP: John Whitby

Area
  - Total: 306 sq mi (792 km^{2})
  - Rank: 41st

Population (2025)
  - Total: 72,028
  - Rank: Ranked 285th
  - Density: 236/sq mi (90.9/km^{2})

Ethnicity (2021)
  - Ethnic groups: List: 97.8% White; 1% Mixed; 0.7% Asian; 0.3% other; 0.2% Black

Religion (2021)
  - Religion: List: 59% Christianity; 39.6% no religion; 1% other; 0.4% Islam
- Time zone: UTC+0 (Greenwich Mean Time)
  - Summer (DST): UTC+1 (British Summer Time)
- ONS code: 17UF (ONS); E07000035 (GSS)
- Ethnicity: 97.8% White; 0.8% .Asian

Derbyshire Dales (/ˈdɑːrbiʃɪər, -ʃər/ DAR-bee-sheer, -shər) is a local government district in Derbyshire, England. The district was created in 1974 as West Derbyshire; the name was changed to Derbyshire Dales in 1987. The council is based in the town of Matlock, and the district also includes the towns of Ashbourne, Bakewell, Darley Dale and Wirksworth, as well as numerous villages and extensive rural areas. Much of the district is within the Peak District National Park.

The neighbouring districts are High Peak, Sheffield, North East Derbyshire, Amber Valley, South Derbyshire, East Staffordshire and Staffordshire Moorlands.

== History ==
The district was formed on 1 April 1974 under the Local Government Act 1972 as one of nine districts within Derbyshire. The new district covered the area of six former rural and urban districts, which were all abolished at the same time:

- Ashbourne Rural District
- Ashbourne Urban District
- Bakewell Rural District
- Bakewell Urban District
- Matlock Urban District (which also covered several other settlements)
- Wirksworth Urban District (which included Middleton-by-Wirksworth)

The new district was initially named "West Derbyshire", reflecting its position within the wider county. The council changed the name to "Derbyshire Dales" with effect from 1 January 1987.

Under current local government restructuring plans it is planned that the district will be abolished in 2028, with its area forming part of a new Derbyshire North unitary authority.

== Governance ==
Derbyshire Dales District Council

Type
- Type: Non-metropolitan district

Leadership
- Chair: Jo Linthwaite, Liberal Democrat since 28 May 2026
- Leader: Steve Flitter, Liberal Democrat since 25 May 2023
- Chief Executive: Paul Wilson since 1 June 2018

Structure
- Seats: 34 councillors
- Graph of the party split among 34 seats.
- Political groups: Administration (16) Liberal Democrats (12) Green (4) Other parties (18) Conservative (9) Labour (6) Independent (3)

Elections
- Last election: 4 May 2023
- Next election: 6 May 2027

Meeting place
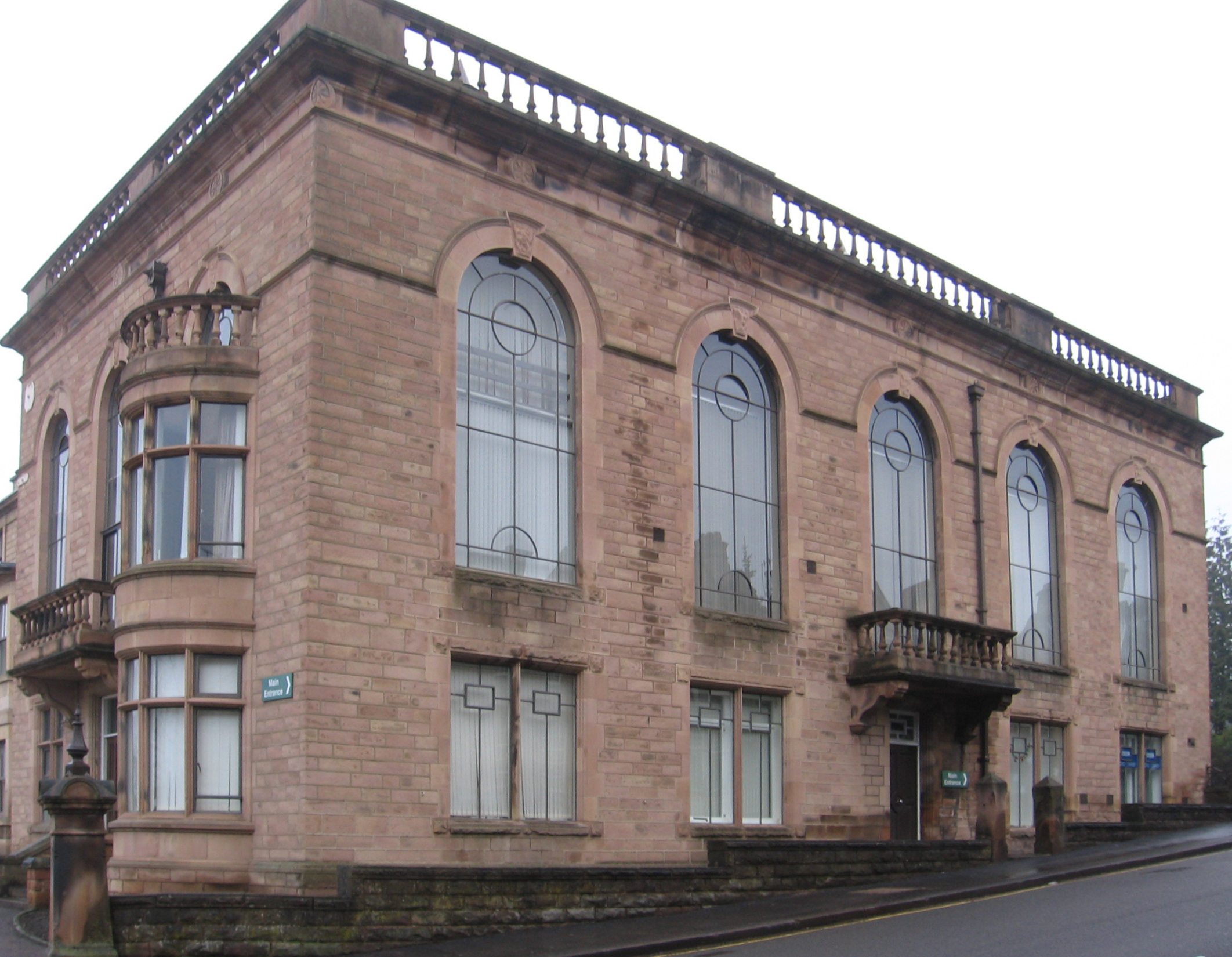
- Town Hall, Bank Road, Matlock, DE4 3NN

Website
- www.derbyshiredales.gov.uk

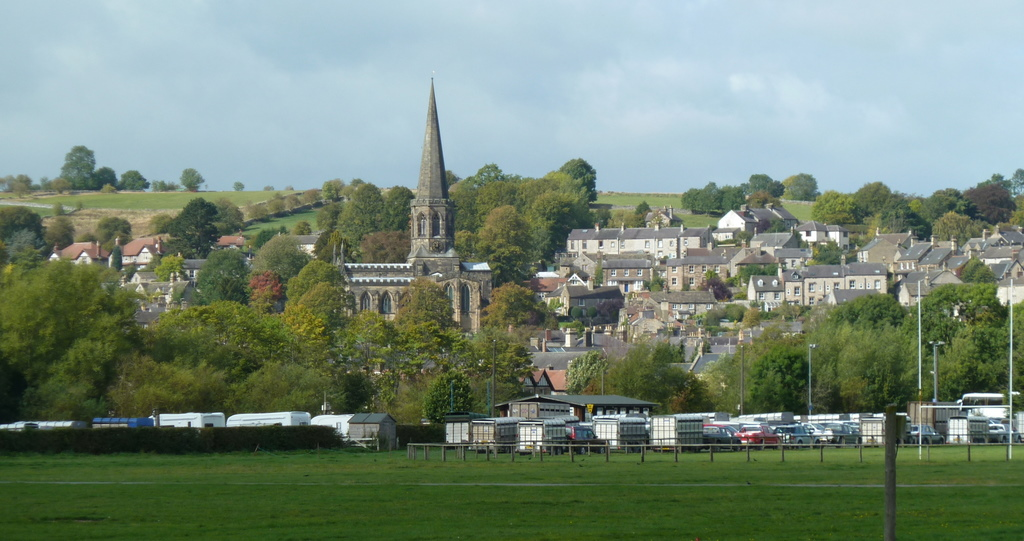
Bakewell, which is famous for being the home of the Bakewell tart.

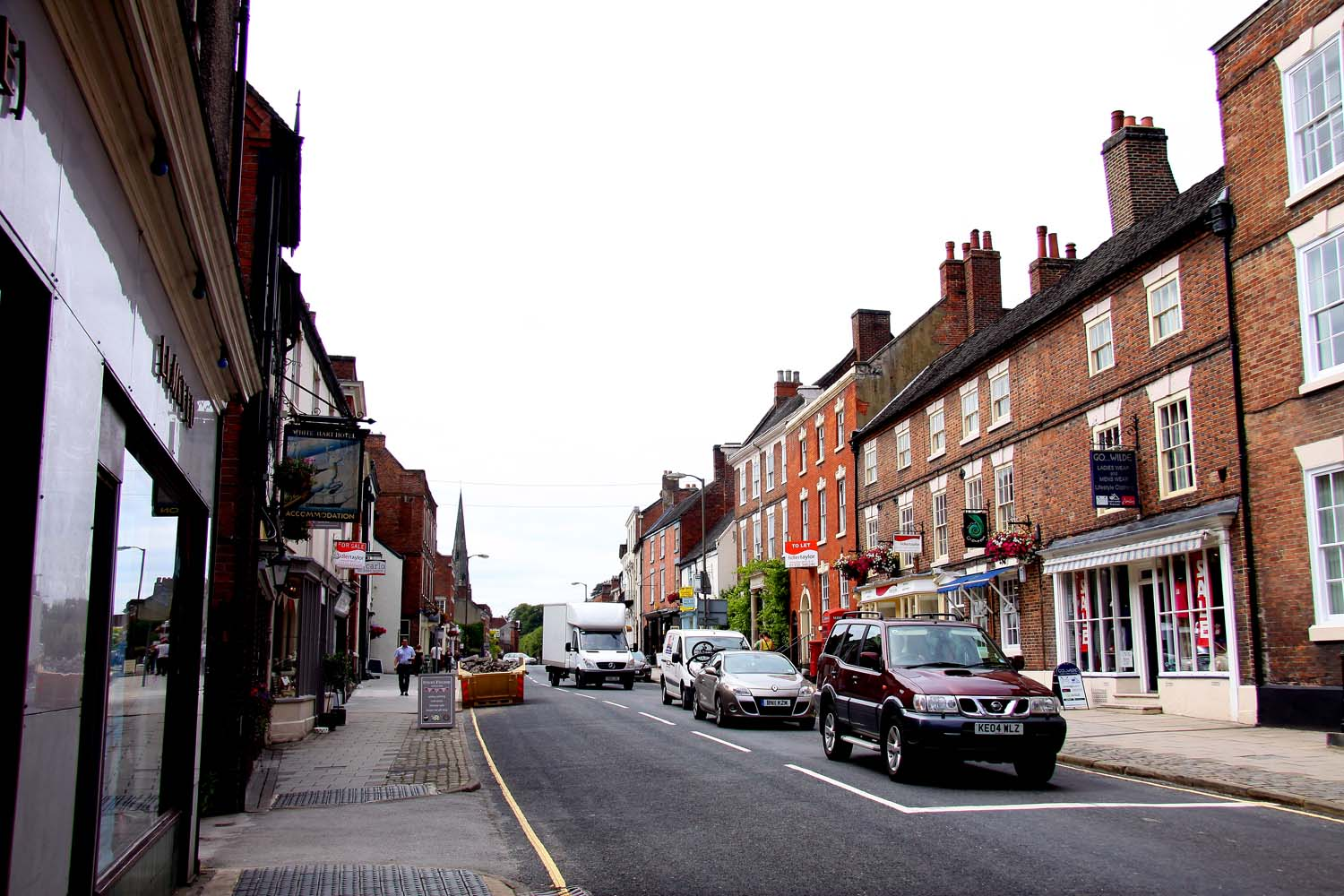
Ashbourne, known for being both the start of the Tissington Trail and St Oswald's Church

Derbyshire Dales District Council provides district-level services. County-level services are provided by Derbyshire County Council. The district is also entirely covered by civil parishes, which form a third tier of local government. In the parts of the district within the Peak District National Park town planning is the responsibility of the Peak District National Park Authority. The district council appoints two of its councillors to serve on the 30-person National Park Authority.

Since 2014 the district has been a non-constituent member of the South Yorkshire Mayoral Combined Authority (formerly known as the Sheffield City Region); the council sends representatives to meetings of the combined authority, but the electorate of Derbyshire Dales do not vote in elections for the Mayor of South Yorkshire.

=== Political control ===
The council has been under no overall control since 2023. Following the 2023 election an alliance of the Liberal Democrats, Labour and the Greens formed to lead the council as a joint administration. However, this partnership dissolved when Labour formally pulled out of the agreement following a national party directive, leaving the Liberal Democrats and Greens to continue leading as a minority administration.

The first election to the council was held in 1973, initially operating as a shadow authority alongside the outgoing authorities until the new arrangements came into effect on 1 April 1974. Political control of the council since 1974 has been as follows:

Party in control	Years
No overall control	1974–1976
Conservative	1976–1995
No overall control	1995–1999
Conservative	1999–2023
No overall control	2023–present

=== Leadership ===
The leaders of the council since 1974 have been:

Councillor	Party	From	To
Terence Wray	Independent	1 Apr 1974	17 Jan 1975
Lewis Rose	Conservative	20 Feb 1975	25 May 1978
Arthur Clemson	Conservative	25 May 1978	May 1979
George Ward	Independent	22 May 1979	1989
Lewis Rose	Conservative	Jul 1989	May 1995
David Fearn	Liberal Democrats	25 May 1995	May 1998
Steve Flitter	Liberal Democrats	May 1998	May 1999
Lewis Rose	Conservative	May 1999	30 May 2019
Garry Purdy	Conservative	30 May 2019	8 Mar 2023
Steve Flitter	Liberal Democrats	25 May 2023	

=== Composition ===
Following the 2023 election, and subsequent by-elections and changes of allegiance up to May 2025, the composition of the council was:

Party	Seats
Liberal Democrats	12
Labour	6
Green	4
Conservative	9
Independent	3
Total	34

Two of the independent councillors form the "Derbyshire First" group. The next election is due in 2027.

=== Elections ===
Since the last boundary changes in 2023 the council has comprised 34 councillors representing 21 wards, with each ward electing one, two or three councillors. Elections are held every four years.

The district is entirely within the Derbyshire Dales parliamentary constituency, created in 2010. The constituency is slightly larger than the district, also including parts of Amber Valley.

=== Premises ===
The council is based at Matlock Town Hall on Bank Road in Matlock. The oldest part of the building was built c. 1850 as a house called Bridge House. It was bought by the local council in 1894 and a large Italianate extension facing Bank Road was completed in 1898. The building served as the headquarters of Matlock Urban District Council between 1894 and 1974. Following local government reorganisation further large extensions were added in 1979.

== Places and parishes ==
The district is entirely divided into civil parishes. The parish councils for Ashbourne, Bakewell, Darley Dale, Matlock and Wirksworth take the style "town council". Some of the smaller parishes have a parish meeting rather than a parish council.

Places in the district include:

- Alsop-en-le-Dale, Ashford-in-the-Water, Ashbourne
- Bakewell, Baslow, Beeley, Biggin, Birchover, Bonsall, Bradbourne, Bradwell, Brailsford, Brassington, Bretton
- Calver, Carsington, Chatsworth, Chelmorton, Cromford, Curbar
- Darley Dale, Doveridge
- Earl Sterndale, Edensor, Elton, Eyam
- Fenny Bentley, Foolow, Froggatt
- Great Hucklow, Great Longstone, Grindleford
- Hassop, Hathersage, Hognaston, Hartington
- Kirk Ireton, Kniveton
- Little Hucklow, Litton, Longford
- Matlock, Matlock Bath, Middleton-by-Wirksworth, Middleton-by-Youlgreave, Monyash
- Over Haddon
- Parwich
- Rowsley
- South Darley, Stanton-in-Peak, Stoney Middleton, Sudbury
- Taddington, Tansley, Thorpe, Tideswell, Tissington
- Wardlow, Wensley, Winster, Wirksworth
- Youlgreave

== Media ==
In terms of television, the district is served by BBC East Midlands and ITV Central.

Radio stations for the area are BBC Radio Derby, Capital Midlands, Peak FM, and High Peak Radio.

Matlock Mercury is the local newspaper that covers the area.
