= Derby City Council elections =

Local government elections in Derbyshire, England

Derby City Council elections are held every four years to elect members of Derby City Council, the local authority for the unitary authority of Derby in Derbyshire, England. Since the last boundary changes in 2023, 51 councillors have been elected from 18 wards. Prior to 2023 elections were held three years out of every four, with a third of the council elected each time.

== Council elections ==
- 1973 Derby Borough Council election
- 1976 Derby Borough Council election
- 1979 Derby City Council election (New ward boundaries)
- 1980 Derby City Council election
- 1982 Derby City Council election
- 1983 Derby City Council election
- 1984 Derby City Council election
- 1986 Derby City Council election
- 1987 Derby City Council election
- 1988 Derby City Council election
- 1990 Derby City Council election
- 1991 Derby City Council election
- 1992 Derby City Council election
- 1994 Derby City Council election
- 1995 Derby City Council election
- 1996 Derby City Council election
- 1998 Derby City Council election
- 1999 Derby City Council election
- 2000 Derby City Council election
- 2002 Derby City Council election (New ward boundaries increased the number of seats by seven)
- 2003 Derby City Council election
- 2004 Derby City Council election
- 2006 Derby City Council election
- 2007 Derby City Council election
- 2008 Derby City Council election
- 2010 Derby City Council election
- 2011 Derby City Council election
- 2012 Derby City Council election
- 2014 Derby City Council election
- 2015 Derby City Council election
- 2016 Derby City Council election
- 2018 Derby City Council election
- 2019 Derby City Council election
- 2021 Derby City Council election
- 2022 Derby City Council election
- 2023 Derby City Council election (New ward boundaries and change to elections every four years)

== City result maps ==
1979 results map

1980 results map

1982 results map

1983 results map

1984 results map

1986 results map

1987 results map

1988 results map

1990 results map

1991 results map

1992 results map

1994 results map

1995 results map

1996 results map

1998 results map

1999 results map

2000 results map

2002 results map

2003 results map

2004 results map

2006 results map

2007 results map

2008 results map

2010 results map

2011 results map

2012 results map

2014 results map

2015 results map

2016 results map

2018 results map

2019 results map

2021 results map

2022 results map

2023 results map

== By-election results ==
=== 1994–1998 ===
Babington By-Election 10 July 1997
Party	Candidate	Votes	%	±%
Labour		1,009	71.8	+2.4
Liberal Democrats		396	28.2	+20.2
Majority		613	43.6	
Turnout		1,405	18.6	
Labour hold		Swing		

Osmaston By-Election 10 July 1997
Party	Candidate	Votes	%	±%
Labour		557	65.6	−15.6
Liberal Democrats		225	26.5	+7.7
National Democrat		67	7.9	+7.9
Majority		332	39.1	
Turnout		849	14.8	
Labour hold		Swing		

=== 1998–2002 ===
Derwent By-Election 7 June 2001
Party	Candidate	Votes	%	±%
Labour		2,149	62.5	+2.9
Conservative		796	23.2	−5.0
Liberal Democrats		492	14.3	+2.2
Majority		1,353	39.3	
Turnout		3,437		
Labour hold		Swing		

=== 2002–2006 ===
Mackworth By-Election 29 July 2004
Party	Candidate	Votes	%	±%
Labour	Lisa Higginbottom	1,180	41.0	−2.6
Liberal Democrats	Simon Lysaczenko	941	32.7	+0.1
Conservative	Frank Harwood	290	10.1	−13.6
UKIP	Martin Bardoe	287	10.0	+10.0
BNP	Robert Poundall	182	6.3	+6.3
Majority		239	8.3	
Turnout		2,880	31.0	
Labour hold		Swing		

Abbey By-Election 14 July 2005
Party	Candidate	Votes	%	±%
Labour	Asaf Afzal	1,187	45.2	+16.5
Liberal Democrats	Michael Mullaney	1,176	44.8	+2.4
Conservative	Andrew Hill	173	6.6	−5.8
UKIP	D. Black	88	3.3	−11.1
Majority		11	0.4	
Turnout		2,624		
Labour gain from Liberal Democrats		Swing		

Derwent By-Election 14 July 2005
Party	Candidate	Votes	%	±%
Labour	Martin Rawson	1,193	63.6	+14.2
Conservative	Frank Harwood	462	24.6	−6.6
Liberal Democrats	Rafe Nauen	161	8.5	−10.9
UKIP	S. Deakin	60	3.2	+3.2
Majority		731	39.0	
Turnout		1,876	21.0	
Labour hold		Swing		

=== 2006–2010 ===
Darley By-Election 24 July 2008
Party	Candidate	Votes	%	±%
Liberal Democrats	John Paul Keane	1,040	35.8	−0.9
Conservative	Lorraine Radford	976	33.6	+4.1
Labour	Chris Wynn	695	23.9	−1.0
Green	David Clasby	192	6.6	−2.2
Majority		64	2.2	
Turnout		2,903	27.2	
Liberal Democrats hold		Swing		

Allestree By-Election 1 October 2009
Party	Candidate	Votes	%	±%
Conservative	Saadia Davis	1,988	52.3	−10.2
Liberal Democrats	Deena Smith	1,037	27.3	+15.1
Labour	Josh Eades	532	14.0	−0.3
BNP	Paul Hilliard	242	6.4	−4.5
Majority		951	25.0	
Turnout		3,799	34.7	
Conservative hold		Swing		

=== 2014–2018 ===
Allestree by-election 29 September 2016
Party	Candidate	Votes	%	±%
Conservative	Ged Potter	2,006	54.2%	
Liberal Democrats	Deena Smith	1,053	28.5%	
Labour	Oleg Sotnicenko	409	11.1%	
Green	Marten Kats	115	3.1%	
UKIP	Gaurav Pandey	91	2.5%	
Majority		953	25.9%	
Turnout		3,674		
Conservative hold		Swing		

The by-election was called after former Conservative councillor Richard Smalley was jailed for giving a false address.

Derwent by-election 9 March 2017
Party	Candidate	Votes	%	±%
Conservative	Steve Willoughby	789	37.1	+28.1
Labour	Nadine Peatfield	611	28.7	−2.4
UKIP	Tony Crawley	537	25.2	−7.2
Liberal Democrats	Simon Ferrigno	192	9.0	−15.4
Majority		178	8.4	
Turnout		2,138	21.9	
Conservative gain from UKIP		Swing		
