= 2010–2012 Derby City Council elections =

Three Derby City Council elections were a series of election held from 2010–2012 to elect members of Derby City Council in Derby, England.

- 2010 Derby City Council election, held on 5 May 2010, yielding No Overall Control.
- 2011 Derby City Council election, held on 5 May 2011, yielding No Overall Control.
- 2012 Derby City Council election, held on 3 May 2012, yielding Labour Party control.
