= 2019 Derby City Council election =

2019 UK local government election

← 2018	3 May 2019	2021 →

17 of the 51 seats to Derby City Council 26 seats needed for a majority
	First party	Second party	Third party
Party	Conservative	Labour	Liberal Democrats
Last election	20	23	5
Seats before	19	22	5
Seats won	6	5	3
Seats after	20	16	7
Seat change	▲1	▼6	▲2
Popular vote	20,137	19,360	11,402
Percentage	31.6%	30.4%	17.9%
	Fourth party	Fifth party
Party	UKIP	Independent
Last election	3	0
Seats before	3	2
Seats won	2	1
Seats after	5	3
Seat change	▲2	▲1
Popular vote	9,828	2,737
Percentage	15.4%	4.3%
- Map showing the results of contested wards in the 2019 Derby City Council elections.
Council control before election
No overall control
Council control after election
No overall control

The 2019 Derby City Council election took place on 2 May 2019 to elect members of Derby City Council in England. This was on the same day as other local elections. The council remained under no overall control, with the Conservative Party overtaking the Labour Party as the largest party after gains in Chaddesden and Derwent. The Labour Party lost many of its leading councillors, including deputy leader Martin Rawson, former cabinet members Asaf Afzal and Amo Raju and former Group and Council leader Paul Bayliss.

== Election results ==
2019 Derby City Council election
Party	This election			Full council			This election		
Party	Seats	Net	Seats %	Other	Total	Total %	Votes	Votes %	+/−
Conservative	6	▲1	35.3	14	20	39.2	20,137	31.6	+0.4
Labour	5	▼6	29.4	11	16	31.4	19,360	30.4	–6.8
Liberal Democrats	3	▲2	17.6	4	7	13.7	11,402	17.9	+5.9
UKIP	2	▲2	11.8	3	5	9.8	9,828	15.4	–1.5
Independent	1	▲1	5.9	2	3	5.9	2,737	4.3	+3.5
Green	0	Steady	0.0	0	0	0.0	212	0.3	–0.8
Link Party	0	Steady	0.0	0	0	0.0	67	0.1	New

All comparisons in vote share are to the corresponding 2015 election.

== Ward results ==
=== Abbey ===
Location of Abbey ward

Abbey (1 Seat)
Party	Candidate	Votes	%
Liberal Democrats	Ajit Singh Atwal	1,505	42.9
Labour	Asaf Afzal	1,288	36.7
Conservative	Harvey Jennings Conservative	306	8.7
UKIP	Carole Lynne Bradley	264	7.5
Independent	Ian George Toone	148	4.2
Majority		217	6.2
Turnout		3,511	36.6
Liberal Democrats gain from Labour			

=== Allestree ===
Location of Allestree ward

Allestree (1 Seat)
Party	Candidate	Votes	%
Conservative	Steve Hassall	3,209	62.4
Labour	Cecile Yvonne Wright	839	16.3
Liberal Democrats	Roger Anthony Jackson	616	12.0
UKIP	Graham Frank Leeming	476	9.3
Majority		2,370	46.1
Turnout		5,140	47.4
Conservative hold			

=== Alvaston ===
Location of Alvaston ward

Alvaston (1 Seat)
Party	Candidate	Votes	%
UKIP	Kirk Lewis Kus	2,038	56.4
Labour	Jonathan Paul Bayliss	958	26.5
Conservative	Emma Blacklock	417	11.5
Liberal Democrats	Preetinder Kaur Butter	201	5.6
Majority		1,080	29.9
Turnout		3,614	31.1
UKIP gain from Labour			

=== Arboretum ===
Location of Arboretum ward

Arboretum (1 Seat)
Party	Candidate	Votes	%
Labour	Fareed Hussain	2,286	72.3
Liberal Democrats	Jairo Fernando Marrero	328	10.4
Conservative	Julio Ryan Mekki Abraham	325	10.3
UKIP	Tony Blaney	225	7.1
Majority		1,958	61.9
Turnout		3,164	27.3
Labour hold			

=== Blagreaves ===
Location of Blagreaves ward

Blagreaves (1 Seat)
Party	Candidate	Votes	%
Liberal Democrats	Danielle Michelle Lind	2,105	49.6
Labour	Amo Raju	1,356	32.0
Conservative	Charnjeev Singh Bolla	453	10.7
UKIP	Vincent Davis	329	7.8
Majority		749	17.6
Turnout		4,243	43.5
Liberal Democrats gain from Labour			

=== Boulton ===
Location of Boulton ward

Boulton (1 Seat)
Party	Candidate	Votes	%
UKIP	Alan Jack Graves	1,922	55.7
Labour	Lucy Clementine Moores Rigby	743	21.5
Conservative	Iain Parker	621	18.0
Liberal Democrats	Jane Elizabeth Katharine Webb	166	4.8
Majority		1,179	34.2
Turnout		3,452	34.3
UKIP gain from Labour			

=== Chaddesden ===
Location of Chaddesden ward

Chaddesden (1 Seat)
Party	Candidate	Votes	%
Conservative	Jerry Pearce	2,056	58.3
Labour	Sara Frances Bolton	796	22.6
UKIP	Jakob Paul Marshall	511	14.5
Liberal Democrats	Glenda Anne Howcroft	163	4.6
Majority		1,260	35.7
Turnout		3,526	35.5
Conservative gain from Labour			

=== Chellaston ===
Location of Chellaston ward

Chellaston (1 Seat)
Party	Candidate	Votes	%
Independent	Philip John Ingall	1,798	39.3
Conservative	Alan Leslie Grimadell	1,625	35.5
Labour	Ashiq Hussain	541	11.8
UKIP	George Daniel Warren	327	7.1
Liberal Democrats	Paul James Wilson	287	6.3
Majority		173	3.8
Turnout		4,578	39.1
Independent gain from Conservative			

=== Darley ===
Location of Darley ward

Darley (1 Seat)
Party	Candidate	Votes	%
Labour	Martin Jeffrey Repton	2,029	48.3
Conservative	Maxwell Arnold John Bradley Craven	1,052	25.0
Liberal Democrats	Phil Harris	738	17.6
UKIP	Andrew Leslie Bennett	383	9.1
Majority		977	23.3
Turnout		4,202	41.2
Labour hold			

=== Derwent ===
Location of Derwent ward

Derwent (1 Seat)
Party	Candidate	Votes	%
Conservative	James Daniel Testro	1,211	47.4
Labour	Martin James Rawson	733	28.7
UKIP	Barry Peter Appleby	449	17.6
Liberal Democrats	Simon Ferrigno	161	6.3
Majority		478	18.7
Turnout		2,554	25.9
Conservative gain from Labour			

=== Littleover ===
Location of Littleover ward

Littleover (1 Seat)
Party	Candidate	Votes	%
Liberal Democrats	Michael John Carr	2,252	49.7
Labour	Jamie Anthony D`Arcy	1,075	23.7
Conservative	Edward James Packham	828	18.3
UKIP	Jennifer Christine Palmer	308	6.8
Link Party	Tony Welch	67	1.5
Majority		1,177	26.0
Turnout		4,530	
Liberal Democrats hold			

=== Mackworth ===
Location of Mackworth ward

Mackworth (1 Seat)
Party	Candidate	Votes	%
Labour	Diane Elizebeth Froggatt	1,105	38.7
Conservative	Gaurav Pandey	980	34.3
UKIP	Maureen Hodgetts	534	18.7
Liberal Democrats	Martin Stuart Jones	238	8.3
Majority		125	4.4
Turnout		2,857	28.7
Labour hold			

=== Mickleover ===
Location of Mickleover ward

Mickleover (1 Seat)
Party	Candidate	Votes	%
Conservative	Miles Hugo Pattison	2,309	44.7
Liberal Democrats	Maggie Hird	1,913	37.1
Labour	Thomas Noel William Spray	546	10.6
UKIP	Derek Reynolds	393	7.6
Majority		396	7.6
Turnout		5,161	45.7
Conservative hold			

=== Normanton ===
Location of Normanton ward

Normanton (1 Seat)
Party	Candidate	Votes	%
Labour	Jangir Khan	2,462	75.4
Conservative	Peter Stanley Berry	290	8.9
UKIP	Roger George Adcock	281	8.6
Liberal Democrats	Paul Lind	233	7.1
Majority		2,172	66.5
Turnout		3,266	31.7
Labour hold			

=== Oakwood ===
Location of Oakwood ward

Oakwood (1 Seat)
Party	Candidate	Votes	%
Conservative	Robin John Wood	1,583	46.0
Independent	Alex Dann	791	23.0
Labour	Neil Wilson	534	15.5
UKIP	Gary John Small	334	9.7
Liberal Democrats	Tim Holyoake	203	5.9
Majority		792	23.0
Turnout		3,445	34.1
Conservative hold			

=== Sinfin ===
Location of Sinfin ward

Sinfin (1 Seat)
Party	Candidate	Votes	%
Labour	Joanna Terese West	1,352	50.7
Conservative	Jay Joshi	605	22.7
UKIP	Doug Lumley	538	20.2
Liberal Democrats	Carmine Branco	173	6.5
Majority		747	28.0
Turnout		2,668	26.3
Labour hold			

=== Spondon ===
Location of Spondon ward

Spondon (1 Seat)
Party	Candidate	Votes	%
Conservative	Nicola Angela Roulstone	2,267	59.2
Labour	Pauline Inwood	717	18.7
UKIP	David Charles Adams	516	13.5
Green	Vic Wood	212	5.5
Liberal Democrats	Andrew John Parnall	120	3.1
Majority		1,550	40.5
Turnout		3,832	38.6
Conservative hold			
