= 2016 Derby City Council election =

2016 UK local government election

← 2015	5 May 2016	2018 →

17 of the 51 seats to Derby City Council 26 seats needed for a majority
	First party	Second party
Party	Labour	Conservative
Seats before	29	14
Seats won	7	7
Seats after	26	17
Seat change	▼3	▲3
Popular vote	18,410	19,881
Percentage	31.7%	34.2%
	Third party	Fourth party
Party	Liberal Democrats	UKIP
Seats before	6	2
Seats won	2	2
Seats after	5	3
Seat change	▼1	▲1
Popular vote	8,738	9,107
Percentage	15.0%	15.7%
- Map showing the results of contested wards in the 2016 Derby City Council elections.
Council control before election
Labour
Council control after election
Labour

The 2016 Derby City Council election took place on 5 May 2016 to elect members of Derby City Council in England. This was on the same day as other local elections. The Labour Party retained control of the council, albeit with their majority reduced to just one seat.

== Overall results ==
2016 Derby City Council Election
Party	Seats	Gains	Losses	Net gain/loss	Seats %	Votes %	Votes	+/−
Conservative	7	3	0	▲3	41.2	34.2	19,881	▲9.7
Labour	7	0	3	▼3	41.2	31.6	18,410	▼13.1
Liberal Democrats	2	0	1	▼1	11.8	15.0	8,738	▼5.6
UKIP	1	1	0	▲1	5.9	15.6	9,107	▲0.5
Green	0	0	0	Steady	0.0	1.9	1,086	▼1.1
Independent	0	0	0	Steady	0.0	0.8	443	▲New
TUSC	0	0	0	Steady	0.0	0.8	441	▲New
British Independents	0	0	0	Steady	0.0	0.1	83	▲New
Link Party	0	0	0	Steady	0.0	0.1	45	▲New

All comparisons in vote share are to the corresponding 2012 election.

At the previous election the composition of the council was:

↓
29	14	6	2
Labour	Conservative	LD	UKIP

After the election the composition of the council was:

↓
26	17	5	3
Labour	Conservative	LD	UKIP

== Ward results ==
=== Abbey ===
Location of Abbey ward

Abbey (1 Seat)
Party	Candidate	Votes	%
Labour	Sarah Elizabeth Russell	1,152	41.3%
Liberal Democrats	Ajit Singh Atwal	764	27.4%
Conservative	Jordan Kemp	409	14.6%
UKIP	Barry Appleby	296	10.6%
Green	George Hind	138	4.9%
TUSC	Jonathan Sykes	33	1.2%
Majority		388	13.9%
Turnout		2,792	29.3%
Labour hold			

=== Allestree ===
Location of Allestree ward

Allestree (1 Seat)
Party	Candidate	Votes	%
Conservative	Richard Jason Smalley	2,820	60.7%
Labour	Oleg Sotnicenko	785	16.9%
Liberal Democrats	Deena Smith	534	11.5%
UKIP	Frank Leeming	508	10.9%
Majority		2,035	41.8%
Turnout		4,647	42.1%
Conservative hold			

=== Alvaston ===
Location of Alvaston ward

Alvaston (1 Seat)
Party	Candidate	Votes	%
UKIP	John Evans	1,562	46.3%
Labour	Mark Stuart Tittley	1,120	33.2%
Conservative	Christopher Philip King	429	12.7%
Liberal Democrats	Robert John Mason	179	5.3%
British Independents	David Andrew Gale	45	1.3%
TUSC	Jo Warren	42	1.2%
Majority		442	13.1%
Turnout		3,377	29.7%
UKIP gain from Labour			

=== Arboretum ===
Location of Arboretum ward

Arboretum (1 Seat)
Party	Candidate	Votes	%
Labour	Gulfraz Nawaz	1,707	48.0%
Conservative	Matlub Hussain	1,280	36.0%
UKIP	Jhanzab Arif	190	5.3%
Liberal Democrats	David Robert Batey	171	4.8%
Green	Ian Christopher Sleeman	132	3.7%
TUSC	Lesley Butler	77	2.2%
Majority		427	12.0%
Turnout		3,557	33.7%
Labour hold			

=== Blagreaves ===
Location of Blagreaves ward

Blagreaves (1 Seat)
Party	Candidate	Votes	%
Liberal Democrats	Joe Naitta	1,818	47.2%
Labour	Cecile Yvonne Wright	1,198	31.1%
UKIP	Vincent Davis	417	10.8%
Conservative	David Rodney Jennings	416	10.8%
Majority		620	16.1%
Turnout		3,849	39.4%
Liberal Democrats hold			

=== Boulton ===
Location of Boulton ward

Boulton (1 Seat)
Party	Candidate	Votes	%
Labour	Dom Anderson	981	33.1%
UKIP	Gaurav Pandey	971	32.8%
Conservative	Steve Willoughby	681	23.0%
Green	Leon Adam Nixon	148	5.0%
Liberal Democrats	Greg Webb	137	4.6%
TUSC	Shaun Christopher Stuart	43	1.5%
Majority		10	0.3%
Turnout		2,961	29.8%
Labour hold			

=== Chaddesden ===
Location of Chaddesten ward

Chaddesden (1 Seat)
Party	Candidate	Votes	%
Conservative	Jonathan Charles Smale	1,160	36.2%
Labour	Sue Cowlishaw	1,070	33.4%
UKIP	Anthony Joseph Crawley	735	22.9%
Independent	Paul Hilliard	127	4.0%
Liberal Democrats	Tim Hallam	114	3.6%
Majority		90	2.8%
Turnout		3,206	32.3%
Conservative gain from Labour			

=== Chellaston ===
Location of Chellaston ward

Chellaston (1 Seat)
Party	Candidate	Votes	%
Conservative	Sean William Marshall	1,603	44.5%
Labour	James Matthew West	1,016	28.2%
UKIP	Ian Edward Crompton	552	15.3%
Liberal Democrats	Jane Elizabeth Katharine Webb	429	11.9%
Majority		587	16.3%
Turnout		3,600	31.7%
Conservative hold			

=== Darley ===
Location of Darley ward

Darley (1 Seat)
Party	Candidate	Votes	%
Labour	Jack Stanton	1,459	40.8%
Conservative	Ged Potter	1,135	31.8%
Green	Marten Kats	377	17.8%
UKIP	Andrew Leslie Bennett	337	9.4%
Liberal Democrats	Stephen Francis Connolly	219	6.1%
TUSC	Chris Fernandez	45	1.3%
Majority		324	9.0%
Turnout		3,572	35.1%
Labour hold			

=== Derwent ===
Location of Derwent ward

Derwent (1 Seat)
Party	Candidate	Votes	%
Conservative	Richard Hudson	814	33.4%
Labour	Margaret Eileen Redfern	811	33.2%
UKIP	Martin Fitzpatrick	660	27.0%
Liberal Democrats	Simon Ferrigno	155	6.4%
Majority		3	0.2%
Turnout		2,440	25.3%
Conservative hold			

=== Littleover ===
Location of Littleover ward

Littleover (1 Seat)
Party	Candidate	Votes	%
Liberal Democrats	Eric Ashburner	2,094	51.4%
Labour	Cheryl Jacqueline Pidgeon	994	24.4%
Conservative	Peter Stanley Berry	662	16.2%
UKIP	Arron Mathew Marsden	244	6.0%
Link Party	Tony Welch	83	2.0%
Majority		1,100	27.0%
Turnout		4,077	38.4%
Liberal Democrats hold			

=== Mackworth ===
Location of Mackworth ward

Mackworth (1 Seat)
Party	Candidate	Votes	%
Labour	Paul James Pegg	975	36.0%
UKIP	Rob Cooper	816	30.1%
Conservative	Adrian Michael Pegg	623	23.0%
Liberal Democrats	Ian Colin Deuchar Care	130	4.8%
Green	Kyle Mark Bolderson	123	4.5%
TUSC	Stevie Rosso	44	1.6%
Majority		159	5.9%
Turnout		2,711	28.8%
Labour hold			

=== Mickleover ===
Location of Mickleover ward

Mickleover (1 Seat)
Party	Candidate	Votes	%
Conservative	Matthew Edward Holmes	2,549	51.1%
Liberal Democrats	Maggie Hird	1,525	30.6%
Labour	Craig Lee Thomson	560	11.2%
UKIP	Kirk Lewis Kus	353	7.1%
Majority		1,024	20.5%
Turnout		4,987	43.3%
Conservative gain from Liberal Democrats			

=== Normanton ===
Location of Normanton ward

Normanton (1 Seat)
Party	Candidate	Votes	%
Labour	Hardyal Singh Dhindsa	1,869	53.2%
Conservative	Habib Iqbal	1,052	29.9%
UKIP	Shaikh Mushtaq Ahmed	276	7.9%
Liberal Democrats	Preetinder Kaur Butter	115	3.3%
Green	Fred Gough	107	3.0%
TUSC	Terence Mortimer Anderson	96	2.7%
Majority		817	23.3%
Turnout		3,515	35.4%
Labour hold			

=== Oakwood ===
Location of Oakwood ward

Oakwood (1 Seat)
Party	Candidate	Votes	%
Conservative	Frank Harwood	1,820	58.3%
Labour	Neil Wilson	549	17.6%
UKIP	Joanna Rachel Beck	342	11.0%
Independent	Alex Dann	316	10.1%
Liberal Democrats	Roger Anthony Jackson	93	3.0%
Majority		1,271	40.7%
Turnout		3,120	31.1%
Conservative hold			

=== Sinfin ===
Location of Sinfin ward

Sinfin (1 Seat)
Party	Candidate	Votes	%
Labour	Baggy Shanker	1,377	56.7%
Conservative	Adam Mark Hurt	401	16.5%
UKIP	Jayprakash Joshi	384	15.8%
Liberal Democrats	Paul John Lind	144	5.9%
Green	Kayleigh Beth Skipper	61	2.5%
TUSC	Zbigniew Wojcik	61	2.5%
Majority		976	40.2%
Turnout		2,428	24.5%
Labour hold			

=== Spondon ===
Location of Spondon ward

Spondon (1 Seat)
Party	Candidate	Votes	%
Conservative	Evonne Williams	2,027	59.7%
Labour	Michael Steven Winfield	787	23.2%
UKIP	Vaughan Saxby	464	13.7%
Liberal Democrats	John-Paul Keane	117	3.4%
Majority		1,240	36.5%
Turnout		3,395	34.0%
Conservative hold			
