= 2015 Derby City Council election =

2015 UK local government election

← 2014	7 May 2015	2016 →

17 of the 51 seats to Derby City Council 26 seats needed for a majority
	First party	Second party
Party	Labour	Conservative
Seats before	27	14
Seats won	11	5
Seats after	29	14
Seat change	▲2	0
Popular vote	40,309	33,750
Percentage	37.2%	31.2%
	Third party	Fourth party
Party	Liberal Democrats	UKIP
Seats before	7	2
Seats won	1	0
Seats after	6	2
Seat change	▼1	0
Popular vote	13,042	18,293
Percentage	12.0%	16.9%
- Map showing the results of contested wards in the 2015 Derby City Council elections.
Council control before election
Labour
Council control after election
Labour

The 2015 Derby City Council election took place on 7 May 2015 to elect members of the Derby City Council in England. It was held on the same day as other local elections. The Labour Party increased its majority on the council by gaining two seats.

== Election results ==
2015 Derby City Council election
Party	Seats	Gains	Losses	Net gain/loss	Seats %	Votes %	Votes	+/−
Labour	11	2	0	▲2	64.7	37.2	40,309	▼10.8
Conservative	5	0	0	Steady	29.4	31.2	33,750	▲2.0
Liberal Democrats	1	0	1	▼1	5.9	12.0	13,042	▼5.9
UKIP	0	0	0	Steady	0.0	16.9	18,293	New
Green	0	0	0	Steady	0.0	1.1	1,217	▼0.7
Independent	0	0	1	▼1	0.0	0.8	875	▲0.6
TUSC	0	0	0	Steady	0.0	0.6	643	New
BNP	0	0	0	Steady	0.0	0.1	98	▼2.2
British Independents	0	0	0	Steady	0.0	0.1	60	New
English Democrat	0	0	0	Steady	0.0	0.0	50	New

All comparisons in vote share are to the corresponding 2011 election.

== Ward results ==
=== Abbey ===
Location of Abbey ward

Abbey (1 Seat)
Party	Candidate	Votes	%
Labour	Asaf Afzal	2,688	50.1%
Conservative	Edward James Packham	1,056	19.7%
Liberal Democrats	Richard Hudson	875	16.3%
UKIP	Martin Ashley Bardoe	748	13.9%
Majority		1,632	30.4%
Turnout		5,367	54.8%
Labour hold			

=== Allestree ===
Location of Allestree ward

Allestree (1 Seat)
Party	Candidate	Votes	%
Conservative	Steve Hassall	4,867	56.7%
Labour	Simon Peter Parkes	1,835	21.4%
UKIP	Frank Leeming	1,005	11.7%
Liberal Democrats	Deena Smith	883	10.3%
Majority		3,032	35.3%
Turnout		8,590	77.5%
Conservative hold			

=== Alvaston ===
Location of Alvaston ward

Alvaston (1 Seat)
Party	Candidate	Votes	%
Labour	Paul Bayliss	2,588	40.8%
UKIP	Arron Marsden	1,826	28.8%
Conservative	Pete Berry	1,404	22.4%
Liberal Democrats	Ellen Anthony	385	6.1%
TUSC	Charles Albert Taylor	74	1.2%
British Independents	David Andrew Gale	60	0.9%
Majority		762	12.0%
Turnout		6,337	55.9%
Labour hold			

=== Arboretum ===
Location of Arboretum ward

Arboretum (1 Seat)
Party	Candidate	Votes	%
Labour	Fareed Hussain	3,549	71.1%
Conservative	Ross McCristal	505	10.1%
Liberal Democrats	Margaret Hird	434	8.7%
UKIP	Usman Khalid-Raja	387	7.8%
TUSC	Graham Lewis	118	2.4%
Majority		3,044	61.0%
Turnout		4,993	46.3%
Labour hold			

=== Blagreaves ===
Location of Blagreaves ward

Blagreaves (1 Seat)
Party	Candidate	Votes	%
Labour	Amo Raju	2,401	36.8%
Liberal Democrats	Danielle Lind	1,990	30.5%
Conservative	Max Craven	1,235	18.9%
UKIP	Vincent Davis	844	12.9%
Majority		411	6.3%
Turnout		6,527	66.0%
Labour gain from Liberal Democrats			

=== Boulton ===
Location of Boulton ward

Boulton (1 Seat)
Party	Candidate	Votes	%
Labour	Barbara Sybil Jackson	2,177	37.8%
UKIP	Steve Fowke	1,562	27.1%
Conservative	Celia Ingall	1,538	26.7%
Green	David Leonard Foster	239	4.2%
Liberal Democrats	Brian Venn	159	2.8%
TUSC	Shaun Christopher Stuart	80	1.4%
Majority		615	10.7%
Turnout		5,755	57.8%
Labour hold			

=== Chaddesden ===
Location of Chaddesten ward

Chaddesden (1 Seat)
Party	Candidate	Votes	%
Labour	Linda Mary Winter	2,147	34.4%
Conservative	Jonathan Charles Smale	2,131	34.2%
UKIP	Anthony Joseph Crawley	1,558	25.0%
Liberal Democrats	Ian Colin Care	304	4.9%
BNP	Paul Hillard	98	1.6%
Majority		16	0.3%
Turnout		6,238	62.0%
Labour hold			

=== Chellaston ===
Location of Chellaston ward

Chellaston (1 Seat)
Party	Candidate	Votes	%
Conservative	Alan Leslie Grimadell	3,342	43.8%
Labour	Cecile Yvonne Wright	2,161	28.3%
UKIP	John Evans	1,506	19.7%
Liberal Democrats	Jane Elizabeth Katharine Webb	568	7.4%
English Democrat	David William Black	50	0.7%
Majority		1,181	15.5%
Turnout		7,627	67.0%
Conservative hold			

=== Darley ===
Location of Darley ward

Darley (1 Seat)
Party	Candidate	Votes	%
Labour	Martin Jeffrey Repton	2,698	39.1%
Conservative	Jordan Kemp	2,373	34.4%
UKIP	Kirk Lewis Kus	632	9.2%
Green	Alice Sarah Mason-Power	632	9.2%
Liberal Democrats	John Allman Cameron	565	8.2%
Majority		325	4.7%
Turnout		6,900	66.4%
Labour hold			

=== Derwent ===
Location of Derwent ward

Derwent (1 Seat)
Party	Candidate	Votes	%
Labour	Martin Rawson	2,107	42.5%
UKIP	Sarah Ann Hallam	1,336	27.0%
Conservative	Steve Willoughby	1,165	23.5%
Liberal Democrats	Simon Ferrigno	349	7.0%
Majority		771	15.5%
Turnout		4,957	51.4%
Labour hold			

=== Littleover ===
Location of Littleover ward

Littleover (1 Seat)
Party	Candidate	Votes	%
Liberal Democrats	Mike Carr	2,682	35.4%
Labour	Dom Anderson	2,403	31.7%
Conservative	Gee Afsar	1,744	23.0%
UKIP	Vaughan Saxby	606	8.0%
Independent (politician)	Tony Welch	139	1.8%
Majority		279	3.7%
Turnout		7,574	71.9%
Liberal Democrats hold			

=== Mackworth ===
Location of Mackworth ward

Mackworth (1 Seat)
Party	Candidate	Votes	%
Labour	Diane Elizabeth Froggatt	1,811	32.9%
Conservative	Sean Thomas Rose	1,268	23.0%
UKIP	Freddie Theobald	1,094	19.9%
Independent	Lisa Maria Higginbottom*	736	13.4%
Green	Marten Kats	346	6.3%
Liberal Democrats	Catrin Sian Rutland	250	4.5%
Majority		543	9.9%
Turnout		5,505	57.4%
Labour gain from Independent			

Note: Lisa Higginbottom was elected as a Labour councillor at the previous election in 2011, but resigned to sit as an independent in October 2013.

=== Mickleover ===
Location of Mickleover ward

Mickleover (1 Seat)
Party	Candidate	Votes	%
Conservative	John Keith	3,772	43.9%
Liberal Democrats	Peter Joseph Barker	2,382	27.7%
Labour	Lester John Pendrey	1,523	17.7%
UKIP	Ian Edward Crompton	925	10.8%
Majority		1,390	16.2%
Turnout		8,602	73.6%
Conservative hold			

=== Normanton ===
Location of Normanton ward

Normanton (1 Seat)
Party	Candidate	Votes	%
Labour	Jangir Khan	3,763	71.6%
Conservative	Ashley Anthony Waterhouse	597	11.4%
UKIP	Jayprakash Joshi	486	9.2%
Liberal Democrats	Jill Leonard	219	4.2%
TUSC	Terence Anderson	191	3.6%
Majority		3,166	60.2%
Turnout		5,256	51.0%
Labour hold			

=== Oakwood ===
Location of Oakwood ward

Oakwood (1 Seat)
Party	Candidate	Votes	%
Conservative	Robin Wood	3,345	51.0%
Labour	Fay Knight	1,672	25.5%
UKIP	Gary John Small	1,197	18.3%
Liberal Democrats	Roger Anthony Jackson	340	5.2%
Majority		1,673	25.5%
Turnout		6,554	65.1%
Conservative hold			

=== Sinfin ===
Location of Sinfin ward

Sinfin (1 Seat)
Party	Candidate	Votes	%
Labour	Joanna Terese West	2,993	60.7%
UKIP	Gaurav Pandey	1,383	28.0%
Liberal Democrats	Jake Zyla	432	8.8%
TUSC	Zbigniew Wojcik	123	2.5%
Majority		1,610	32.7%
Turnout		6,624	66.5%
Labour hold			

=== Spondon ===
Location of Spondon ward

Spondon (1 Seat)
Party	Candidate	Votes	%
Conservative	Nicola Angela Roulstone	3,384	51.1%
Labour	Richard Morgan	1,793	27.1%
UKIP	Garth Munton	1,222	18.4%
Liberal Democrats	Alf Wall	225	3.4%
Majority		1,591	24.0%
Turnout		6,624	66.5%
Conservative hold			
