= 1994 Derby City Council election =

1994 UK local government election

← 1992	5 May 1994	1995 →

15 of the 44 seats in the Derby City Council 23 seats needed for a majority
	First party	Second party	Third party
Party	Labour	Conservative	Liberal Democrats
Last election	22	22	22
Seats won	11	3	1
Seats after	24	19	1
Seat change	▲2	▼3	▲1
Popular vote	28,423	16,521	9,414
Percentage	52.1%	30.3%	17.3%
- Map showing the results of the 1994 Derby City Council elections.
Council control before election
No overall control
Council control after election
Labour

The 1994 Derby City Council election took place on 5 May 1994 to elect members of Derby City Council in England. Local elections were held in the United Kingdom in 1994. This was on the same day as other local elections. The Labour Party gained control of the council, which had previously been under no overall control.

== Overall results ==
1994 Derby City Council Election
Party	Seats	Gains	Losses	Net gain/loss	Seats %	Votes %	Votes	+/−
Labour	11	2	0	▲2	73.3	52.1	28,423	
Conservative	3	0	3	▼3	20.0	30.3	16,521	
Liberal Democrats	1	1	0	▲1	6.7	17.3	9,414	
National Front	0	0	0	Steady	0.0	0.2	95	
SDP	0	0	0	Steady	0.0	0.1	57	
Total	15						54,510	

== Ward results ==
=== Abbey ===
Location of Abbey ward

Abbey
Party	Candidate	Votes	%
Labour	M. Walker	2,186	69.1%
Conservative	D. Sice	627	19.8%
Liberal Democrats	D. Lilley	350	11.1%
Turnout			33.7%
Labour hold			

=== Allestree ===
Location of Allestree ward

Allestree
Party	Candidate	Votes	%
Conservative	G. Du Sautoy	1,963	52.6%
Labour	K. Merry	998	26.7%
Liberal Democrats	S. King	772	20.7%
Turnout			47.2%
Conservative hold			

=== Alvaston ===
Location of Alvaston ward

Alvaston
Party	Candidate	Votes	%
Labour	C. Wynn	1,830	60.2%
Conservative	B. Matsell	804	26.5%
Liberal Democrats	B. Phelan	404	13.3%
Turnout			38.3%
Labour hold			

=== Babington ===
Location of Babington ward

Babington
Party	Candidate	Votes	%
Labour	V. Wilsoncroft	1,684	67.7%
Conservative	M. Yaqub	546	21.9%
Liberal Democrats	M. Sherazi	259	10.4%
Turnout			34.1%
Labour hold			

=== Blagreaves ===
Location of Blagreaves ward

Blagreaves
Party	Candidate	Votes	%
Labour	M. Redfern	2,253	47.3%
Liberal Democrats	A. Spendlove	1,262	26.5%
Conservative	J. Keith	1,247	26.2%
Turnout			59.2%
Labour gain from Conservative			

=== Boulton ===
Location of Boulton ward

Boulton
Party	Candidate	Votes	%
Labour	A. Kennedy	2,286	59.2%
Conservative	M. Axelrod	1,017	26.3%
Liberal Democrats	P. Harlow	560	14.5%
Turnout			44.4%
Labour hold			

=== Breadsall ===
Location of Breadsall ward

Breadsall
Party	Candidate	Votes	%
Labour	J. Whitby	3,619	54.6%
Conservative	C. Pallett	2,164	32.6%
Liberal Democrats	M. Harris	850	12.8%
Turnout			43.8%
Labour hold			

=== Darley ===
Location of Darley ward

Darley
Party	Candidate	Votes	%
Conservative	S. Hart	1,943	45.1%
Labour	E. Wooley	1,453	33.7%
Liberal Democrats	R. Pratt	916	21.2%
Turnout			46.5%
Conservative hold			

=== Littleover ===
Location of Littleover ward

Littleover
Party	Candidate	Votes	%
Liberal Democrats	M. Burgess	1,823	46.7%
Conservative	G. Shaw	1,094	28.0%
Labour	A. Cotton	933	23.9%
SDP	K. Dickenson	57	1.5%
Turnout			49.0%
Liberal Democrats gain from Conservative			

=== Mackworth ===
Location of Mackworth ward

Mackworth
Party	Candidate	Votes	%
Labour	R. Baxter	1,953	69.5%
Conservative	A. Clemson	543	19.3%
Liberal Democrats	L. Alcock	218	7.8%
National Front	G. Hardy	95	3.4%
Turnout			43.1%
Labour hold			

=== Mickleover ===
Location of Mickleover ward

Mickleover
Party	Candidate	Votes	%
Conservative	N. Keene	1,542	41.4%
Labour	P. Taylor	1,468	39.5%
Liberal Democrats	A. Wilbraham	711	19.1%
Turnout			44.7%
Conservative hold			

=== Normanton ===
Location of Normanton ward

Normanton
Party	Candidate	Votes	%
Labour	S. Bolton	1,928	70.7%
Conservative	A. Javed	458	16.8%
Liberal Democrats	A. Cooper	342	12.5%
Turnout			37.0%
Labour hold			

=== Osmaston ===
Location of Osmaston ward

Osmaston
Party	Candidate	Votes	%
Labour	R. Laxton	1,374	77.6%
Conservative	H. Wakefield	227	12.8%
Liberal Democrats	E. Ashburner	169	9.5%
Turnout			28.7%
Labour hold			

=== Sinfin ===
Location of Sinfin ward

Sinfin
Party	Candidate	Votes	%
Labour	N. Dhindsa	1,919	69.7%
Conservative	A. Pegg	494	17.9%
Liberal Democrats	R. Troup	340	12.4%
Turnout			36.5%
Labour hold			

=== Spondon ===
Location of Spondon ward

Spondon
Party	Candidate	Votes	%
Labour	M. Byrne	2,539	52.6%
Conservative	D. Dickinson	1,852	38.4%
Liberal Democrats	P. Hill	438	9.1%
Turnout			49.0%
Labour gain from Conservative			
