= 1976 Derby Borough Council election =

1976 UK local government election

← 1973	6 May 1976	1979 →

All 54 seats in the Derby Borough Council 28 seats needed for a majority
	First party	Second party
Party	Conservative	Labour
Last election	14	34
Seats won	28	26
Seat change	▲14	▼8
Popular vote	28,646	22,626
Percentage	51.7%	40.8%
Council control before election
Labour
Council control after election
Conservative

The 1976 Derby Borough Council election took place on 6 May 1976 to elect members of Derby Borough Council in England. This was on the same day as other local elections. Voting took place across 18 wards, each electing 3 Councillors. The Conservative Party gained control of the council from the Labour Party.

== Overall results ==
1976 Derby Borough Council Election
Party	Seats	Gains	Losses	Net gain/loss	Seats %	Votes %	Votes	+/−
Conservative	28	14	0	▲14	51.9	51.7	28,646	▲12.2
Labour	26	3	11	▼8	48.1	40.8	22,626	▼5.6
Liberal	0	0	6	▼6	0.0	6.3	3,499	▼4.1
United English National	0	0	0	Steady	0.0	1.2	677	▲0.1
Total	54						55,448	

== Ward results ==
=== Abbey ===
Abbey (3)
Party	Candidate	Votes	%
Labour	F. Tunnicliffe	1,756	
Labour	M. Walker	1,595	
Labour	P. Weightman	1,547	
Conservative	D. Pickering	1,392	
Conservative	R. White	1,366	
Conservative	V. Flint	1,350	
Turnout			32.7%
Labour hold			
Labour hold			
Labour hold			

=== Allestree ===
Allestree (3)
Party	Candidate	Votes	%
Conservative	J. Thorpe	3,673	
Conservative	R. Keene	3,658	
Conservative	B. Chadwick	3,531	
Labour	R. Cooper	790	
Liberal	W. Nuttall	782	
Liberal	M. Taylor	738	
Labour	J. Dolan	727	
Labour	J. Pepper	712	
Turnout			51.9%
Conservative hold			
Conservative hold			
Conservative hold			

=== Alvaston ===
Alvaston (3)
Party	Candidate	Votes	%
Labour	W. Baker	1,381	
Labour	P. Hanks	1,280	
Conservative	J. Owens	1,260	
Labour	T. Potts	1,245	
Conservative	J. Blount	1,137	
Conservative	B. Wood	1,118	
Turnout			35.9%
Labour hold			
Labour hold			
Conservative gain from Labour			

=== Arboretum ===
Arboretum (3)
Party	Candidate	Votes	%
Labour	B. Charles	1,076	
Labour	J. Maltby	1,058	
Labour	S. Unwin	1,012	
Conservative	C. Henchcliffe	695	
Conservative	P. Barham	672	
Conservative	D. Williams	654	
Turnout			32.9%
Labour hold			
Labour hold			
Labour hold			

=== Babington ===
Babington (3)
Party	Candidate	Votes	%
Conservative	A. Bussell	1,671	
Conservative	E. Wood	1,542	
Conservative	C. Gadsby	1,524	
Labour	F. Fox	817	
Labour	G. Fox	812	
Labour	W. Watkins	738	
United English National	S. Gibson	162	
United English National	G. Hitchcock	162	
United English National	A. Ashby	142	
Turnout			31.3%
Conservative hold			
Conservative hold			
Conservative hold			

=== Breadsall ===
Breadsall (3)
Party	Candidate	Votes	%
Labour	O. Eden	1,331	
Labour	G. Summers	1,232	
Labour	A. Wawman	1,211	
Conservative	J. Leatherbarrow	1,099	
Conservative	G. Wooley	1,093	
Conservative	J. Leatherbarrow	1,075	
United English National	B. Gibson	171	
United English National	A. Smith	153	
United English National	L. Gallear	148	
Turnout			%
Labour hold			
Labour hold			
Labour hold			

=== Chaddesden ===
Chaddesden (3)
Party	Candidate	Votes	%
Conservative	G. Andrews	1,682	
Conservative	R. Oldershaw	1,663	
Conservative	H. Sephton	1,536	
Labour	H. Lloyd	1,464	
Labour	R. Neale	1,311	
Labour	A. Harlow	1,261	
Turnout			38.5%
Conservative gain from Labour			
Conservative gain from Labour			
Conservative gain from Labour			

=== Chellaston ===
Chellaston (3)
Party	Candidate	Votes	%
Conservative	C. Morley	2,696	
Conservative	K. Keys	2,673	
Conservative	R. Walker	2,657	
Labour	W. Mathews	2,211	
Labour	G. Styles	2,171	
Labour	J. Taylor	2,090	
Turnout			36.9%
Conservative gain from Labour			
Conservative gain from Labour			
Conservative gain from Labour			

=== Darley ===
Darley (3)
Party	Candidate	Votes	%
Conservative	R. Longdon	1,993	
Conservative	E. Reid	1,941	
Conservative	J. Tillett	1,887	
Labour	M. Mansfield	881	
Labour	G. Bolton	872	
Labour	J. Osborn	792	
Turnout			38.8%
Conservative hold			
Conservative hold			
Conservative hold			

=== Derwent ===
Derwent (3)
Party	Candidate	Votes	%
Labour	G. Topham	1,289	
Labour	L. Topham	1,244	
Labour	E. Ward	1,236	
Conservative	B. Daniels	827	
Conservative	K. Marples	784	
Conservative	G. Du Sautoy	763	
Turnout			29.2%
Labour hold			
Labour hold			
Labour hold			

=== Friar Gate ===
Friar Gate (3)
Party	Candidate	Votes	%
Labour	D. Robinson	1,593	
Labour	J. Christophers	1,515	
Labour	R. Baxter	1,512	
Conservative	R. Bunting	1,174	
Conservative	A. Bunting	1,141	
Conservative	G. Thomas	1,043	
Liberal	M. Peel	632	
Liberal	C. Swain	592	
Liberal	F. Spencer	587	
Turnout			36.6%
Labour gain from Liberal			
Labour gain from Liberal			
Labour gain from Liberal			

=== Litchurch ===
Litchurch (3)
Party	Candidate	Votes	%
Labour	R. Newton	699	
Labour	K. Unwin	657	
Labour	M. Wood	655	
Conservative	A. Northover	354	
Conservative	J. Northover	333	
Conservative	D. Curzon	324	
Turnout			29.4%
Labour hold			
Labour hold			
Labour hold			

=== Littleover ===
Littleover (3)
Party	Candidate	Votes	%
Conservative	M. Grimwood-Taylor	2,751	
Conservative	N. Glenn	2,628	
Conservative	L. Shepley	2,600	
Labour	M. Kimpton	744	
Labour	B. Torney	725	
Labour	F. Brocklehurst	717	
Turnout			40.1%
Conservative hold			
Conservative hold			
Conservative hold			

=== Mickleover ===
Mickleover (3)
Party	Candidate	Votes	%
Conservative	H. Johnson	2,289	
Conservative	C. Hulls	2,204	
Conservative	P. Reynolds	2,131	
Liberal	M. Brown	1,292	
Liberal	M. Burgess	1,210	
Liberal	G. Lawn	1,115	
Labour	P. Johnson	873	
Labour	E. Jones	737	
Labour	I. Slater	611	
Turnout			43.3%
Conservative gain from Liberal			
Conservative gain from Liberal			
Conservative gain from Liberal			

=== Normanton ===
Normanton (3)
Party	Candidate	Votes	%
Conservative	J. Keith	1,786	
Conservative	F. Murphy	1,752	
Conservative	L. Gray	1,732	
Labour	D. Bull	1,663	
Labour	R. King	1,644	
Labour	H. White	1,597	
Turnout			41.8%
Conservative gain from Labour			
Conservative gain from Labour			
Conservative gain from Labour			

=== Osmanton ===
Osmanton (3)
Party	Candidate	Votes	%
Labour	B. Carty	1,305	
Labour	E. Bull	1,283	
Labour	R. Spacey	1,267	
Conservative	D. Black	499	
Conservative	A. Allen	456	
Conservative	S. Lemmings	441	
United English National	E. Baines	178	
United English National	M. Sims	138	
United English National	L. Verity	136	
Turnout			25.7%
Labour hold			
Labour hold			
Labour hold			

=== Pear Tree ===
Pear Tree (3)
Party	Candidate	Votes	%
Labour	W. Pountain	1,365	
Labour	N. Singh	1,327	
Labour	I. Ault	1,246	
Conservative	Y. Garland	688	
Conservative	M. Swindall	659	
Conservative	K. Webley	635	
United English National	J. Sims	166	
United English National	O. Sims	137	
United English National	P. Sims	121	
Turnout			33.2%
Labour hold			
Labour hold			
Labour hold			

=== Spondon ===
Spondon (3)
Party	Candidate	Votes	%
Conservative	W. Leatherbarrow	2,117	
Conservative	G. Swainson	2,076	
Conservative	D. Dickinson	1,950	
Labour	P. Whitt	1,388	
Labour	E. Wright	1,292	
Labour	S. Irwin	1,205	
Liberal	A. Wheway	793	
Liberal	P. Saxton	642	
Liberal	S. Haysum	576	
Turnout			44.2%
Conservative hold			
Conservative hold			
Conservative gain from Labour			
