= 1973 Derby Borough Council election =

1973 UK local government election

7 June 1973	1976 →

All 54 seats in the Derby Borough Council 28 seats needed for a majority
	First party	Second party	Third party
Party	Labour	Conservative	Liberal
Seats won	34	14	6
Popular vote	19,672	16,761	4,403
Percentage	46.4%	39.5%	10.4%
Council control after election
Labour

The 1973 Derby Borough Council election took place on 7 June 1973 to elect members of Derby Borough Council in England. This was on the same day as other local elections. Voting took place across 18 wards, each electing 3 Councillors. Following the Local Government Act 1972, this was the first election to the new non-metropolitan district council for Derby, which came into being on 1 April the following year. The Labour Party took control of the Council after winning a majority of seats.

== Overall results ==
1973 Derby Borough Council Election
Party	Seats	Gains	Losses	Net gain/loss	Seats %	Votes %	Votes	+/−
Labour	34	n/a	n/a	n/a	63.0	46.4	19,672	n/a
Conservative	14	n/a	n/a	n/a	25.9	39.5	16,761	n/a
Liberal	6	n/a	n/a	n/a	11.1	10.4	4,403	n/a
United English National	0	n/a	n/a	n/a	0.0	2.7	1,140	n/a
Independent	0	n/a	n/a	n/a	0.0	1.1	465	n/a
Total	54						42,441	

== Ward results ==
=== Abbey ===
Abbey (3)
Party	Candidate	Votes	%
Labour	F. Tunnicliffe	1,131	
Labour	M. Walker	1,058	
Labour	A. Dearie	1,017	
Conservative	H. Johnson	873	
Conservative	L. Ford	863	
Conservative	R. Bunting	803	
Liberal	M. Burgess	786	
Liberal	I. Gregory	712	
Liberal	M. Hund	686	
Turnout			25.8%
Labour win (new seat)			
Labour win (new seat)			
Labour win (new seat)			

=== Allestree ===
Allestree (3)
Party	Candidate	Votes	%
Conservative	R. Keene	2,790	
Conservative	B. Chadwick	2,711	
Conservative	J. Thorpe	2,710	
Labour	R. Cooper	843	
Labour	N. Pritchard	797	
Labour	L. Pepper	732	
Turnout			36.2%
Conservative win (new seat)			
Conservative win (new seat)			
Conservative win (new seat)			

=== Alvaston ===
Alvaston (3)
Party	Candidate	Votes	%
Labour	W. Baker	1,190	
Labour	P. Hanks	1,120	
Labour	T. Potts	1,075	
Conservative	L. Jackson	646	
Conservative	M. McKeenan	623	
Turnout			24.8%
Labour win (new seat)			
Labour win (new seat)			
Labour win (new seat)			

=== Arboretum ===
Arboretum (3)
Party	Candidate	Votes	%
Labour	G. Harlow	959	
Labour	J. Maltby	879	
Labour	B. Charles	848	
Liberal	D. Mackenzie	569	
Liberal	T. Marchant	494	
Liberal	D. White	476	
Conservative	G. Marshall	270	
United English National	W. Marson	96	
Turnout			28.7%
Labour win (new seat)			
Labour win (new seat)			
Labour win (new seat)			

=== Babington ===
Babington (3)
Party	Candidate	Votes	%
Conservative	A. Bussell	1,214	
Conservative	C. Gadsby	1,181	
Conservative	E. Wood	1,148	
Labour	F. Fox	879	
Labour	U. Christophers	852	
Labour	J. Moseley	838	
United English National	D. Booth	215	
United English National	A. Ashby	193	
United English National	S. Gibson	187	
Turnout			24.7%
Conservative win (new seat)			
Conservative win (new seat)			
Conservative win (new seat)			

=== Breadsall ===
Breadsall (3)
Party	Candidate	Votes	%
Labour	O. Eden	1,231	
Labour	J. McCall	1,160	
Labour	A. Wawman	1,101	
Conservative	B. Gadsby	500	
Conservative	J. Leatherbarrow	464	
United English National	A. Smith	219	
Turnout			20.4%
Labour win (new seat)			
Labour win (new seat)			
Labour win (new seat)			

=== Chaddesden ===
Chaddesden (3)
Party	Candidate	Votes	%
Labour	H. Lloyd	1,158	
Labour	D. Winfield	1,095	
Labour	G. Salt	1,086	
Conservative	G. Black	736	
Conservative	S. Styles	735	
Conservative	E. Woods	733	
Turnout			22.4%
Labour win (new seat)			
Labour win (new seat)			
Labour win (new seat)			

=== Chellaston ===
Chellaston (3)
Party	Candidate	Votes	%
Labour	W. Mathews	1,891	
Labour	G. Styles	1,859	
Labour	M. Swindells	1,764	
Conservative	O. Tivey	1,465	
Conservative	C. Morley	1,429	
Conservative	P. Doncher	1,340	
Turnout			25.5%
Labour win (new seat)			
Labour win (new seat)			
Labour win (new seat)			

=== Darley ===
Darley (3)
Party	Candidate	Votes	%
Conservative	R. Longdon	1,384	
Conservative	E. Reid	1,295	
Conservative	J. Tillett	1,256	
Labour	V. Jepson	593	
Labour	W. Pountain	573	
Labour	G. Fox	572	
Turnout			24.5%
Conservative win (new seat)			
Conservative win (new seat)			
Conservative win (new seat)			

=== Derwent ===
Derwent (3)
Party	Candidate	Votes	%
Labour	A. Harlow	1,052	
Labour	W. Watson	1,042	
Labour	J. Orgill	1,016	
Conservative	B. Daniels	432	
Turnout			18.1%
Labour win (new seat)			
Labour win (new seat)			
Labour win (new seat)			

=== Friar Gate ===
Friar Gate (3)
Party	Candidate	Votes	%
Liberal	D. Ekiert	1,384	
Liberal	C. Swain	1,380	
Liberal	M. Peel	1,349	
Labour	R. Baxter	1,347	
Labour	M. Rebeeck	1,329	
Labour	G. Summers	1,298	
Turnout			27.7%
Liberal win (new seat)			
Liberal win (new seat)			
Liberal win (new seat)			

=== Litchurch ===
Litchurch (3)
Party	Candidate	Votes	%
Labour	D. Bookbinder	727	
Labour	R. Newton	697	
Labour	M. Wood	676	
Conservative	L. Gray	241	
Turnout			20.2%
Labour win (new seat)			
Labour win (new seat)			
Labour win (new seat)			

=== Littleover ===
Littleover (3)
Party	Candidate	Votes	%
Conservative	M. Grimwood-Taylor	1,522	
Conservative	N. Glenn	1,415	
Conservative	L. Shepley	1,378	
Labour	B. Torney	564	
Labour	M. Walker	531	
Labour	L. Tomblin	501	
Independent	A. Campion	465	
Turnout			26.0%
Conservative win (new seat)			
Conservative win (new seat)			
Conservative win (new seat)			

=== Mickleover ===
Mickleover (3)
Party	Candidate	Votes	%
Liberal	G. Larder	1,664	
Liberal	W. Astle	1,658	
Liberal	B. Stokes	1,575	
Conservative	J. Hobson	1,230	
Conservative	R. Greene	1,197	
Conservative	S. O'Brien	1,176	
Labour	J. Cox	456	
Labour	C. Low	447	
Labour	H. Pearce	400	
Turnout			35.7%
Liberal win (new seat)			
Liberal win (new seat)			
Liberal win (new seat)			

=== Normanton ===
Normanton (3)
Party	Candidate	Votes	%
Labour	H. White	1,361	
Labour	J. Ireland	1,352	
Labour	J. Christophers	1,263	
Conservative	T. Prime	1,189	
Conservative	D. Penn	1,168	
Conservative	S. Lemmings	1,153	
Turnout			31.3%
Labour win (new seat)			
Labour win (new seat)			
Labour win (new seat)			

=== Osmanton ===
Osmanton (3)
Party	Candidate	Votes	%
Labour	J. Carty	1,424	
Labour	E. Bull	1,295	
Labour	R. Spacey	1,252	
United English National	E. Baines	268	
Conservative	H. Parsons	251	
Conservative	D. Marshall	243	
Turnout			21.4%
Labour win (new seat)			
Labour win (new seat)			
Labour win (new seat)			

=== Pear Tree ===
Pear Tree (3)
Party	Candidate	Votes	%
Labour	H. Webster	1,501	
Labour	I. Ault	1,401	
Labour	N. Singh	1,328	
Conservative	D. McIntyre	576	
United English National	P. Sims	342	
Turnout			31.2%
Labour win (new seat)			
Labour win (new seat)			
Labour win (new seat)			

=== Spondon ===
Spondon (3)
Party	Candidate	Votes	%
Conservative	J. Owen	1,442	
Conservative	G. Swainson	1,408	
Labour	C. Ufton	1,365	
Conservative	G. Baxendale-Baines	1,340	
Labour	L. Bradbury	1,306	
Labour	W. Wilkinson	1,199	
Turnout			31.9%
Conservative win (new seat)			
Conservative win (new seat)			
Labour win (new seat)			
