= 1983 Derby City Council election =

1983 UK local government election

← 1982	5 May 1983	1984 →

15 of the 44 seats in the Derby City Council 23 seats needed for a majority
	First party	Second party	Third party
Party	Labour	Conservative	Alliance
Last election	27	17	0
Seats before	26	18	0
Seats won	8	6	1
Seats after	25	18	1
Seat change	▼1	Steady	▲1
Popular vote	21,467	17,159	7,952
Percentage	45.7%	36.6%	16.9%
- Map showing the results of the 1983 Derby City Council elections.
Council control before election
Labour
Council control after election
Labour

The 1983 Derby City Council election took place on 5 May 1983 to elect members of Derby City Council in England. This was on the same day as other local elections. 15 of the council's 44 seats were up for election. The Labour Party retained control of the council.

== Overall results ==
1983 Derby City Council Election
Party	Seats	Gains	Losses	Net gain/loss	Seats %	Votes %	Votes	+/−
Labour	8	0	1	▼1	53.3	45.7	21,467	
Conservative	6	0	0	Steady	40.0	36.6	17,159	
Alliance	1	1	0	▲1	6.7	16.9	7,952	
Independent	0	0	0	Steady	0.0	0.5	253	
CCU	0	0	0	Steady	0.0	0.0	13	
Total	15						46,932	

== Ward results ==
=== Abbey ===
Location of Abbey ward

Abbey
Party	Candidate	Votes	%
Labour	F. Tunnicliffe	1,803	59.9%
Conservative	M. Tomlinson	910	30.2%
Alliance	L. Wilson	298	9.9%
Turnout			31.9%
Labour hold			

=== Babington ===
Location of Babington ward

Babington
Party	Candidate	Votes	%
Labour	J. Maltby	2,424	72.8%
Conservative	J. Hackney	657	19.7%
Alliance	J. Cutler	250	7.5%
Turnout			38.7%
Labour hold			

=== Chaddesden ===
Location of Chaddesden ward

Chaddesden
Party	Candidate	Votes	%
Labour	M. Streets	1,615	39.3%
Conservative	G. Andrews	1,441	35.1%
Alliance	K. Dibdon	1,053	25.6%
Turnout			45.9%
Labour hold			

=== Chellaston ===
Location of Chellaston ward

Chellaston
Party	Candidate	Votes	%
Conservative	J. Lissett	1,903	52.7%
Labour	M. Fuller	1,711	47.3%
Turnout			45.8%
Conservative hold			

=== Darley ===
Location of Darley ward

Darley
Party	Candidate	Votes	%
Conservative	A. Wright	2,560	59.5%
Labour	W. Denman	810	18.8%
Alliance	P. Simpson	677	15.7%
Independent	R. Morledge	253	5.9%
Turnout			45.6%
Conservative hold			

=== Derwent ===
Location of Derwent ward

Derwent
Party	Candidate	Votes	%
Alliance	G. Kennedy	1,763	51.9%
Labour	G. Topham	1,195	35.2%
Conservative	C. Hadfield	425	12.5%
CCU	S. Gibson	13	0.4%
Turnout			43.2%
Alliance gain from Labour			

=== Kingsway ===
Location of Kingsway ward

Kingsway
Party	Candidate	Votes	%
Conservative	H. Johnson	1,752	53.4%
Alliance	S. Seward	800	24.4%
Labour	D. Dorrell	726	22.1%
Turnout			40.6%
Conservative hold			

=== Litchurch ===
Location of Litchurch ward

Litchurch
Party	Candidate	Votes	%
Labour	J. McGiven	2,041	73.2%
Conservative	A. Phillips	486	17.4%
Alliance	W. Mooney	261	9.4%
Turnout			35.0%
Labour hold			

=== Littleover ===
Location of Littleover ward

Littleover
Party	Candidate	Votes	%
Conservative	R. Wood	1,913	56.8%
Labour	S. Bolton	878	26.1%
Alliance	G. Taylor	486	14.4%
Ecology	B. Sabine	88	2.6%
Turnout			48.3%
Conservative hold			

=== Mackworth ===
Location of Mackworth ward

Mackworth
Party	Candidate	Votes	%
Labour	J. Anderson	1,817	58.3%
Conservative	B. Haller	916	29.4%
Alliance	P. King	383	12.3%
Turnout			41.0%
Labour hold			

=== Mickleover ===
Location of Mickleover ward

Mickleover
Party	Candidate	Votes	%
Conservative	N. Glen	Unopposed	
Turnout		n/a	n/a
Conservative hold			

=== Normanton ===
Location of Normanton ward

Normanton
Party	Candidate	Votes	%
Labour	F. Brocklehurst	2,012	61.0%
Conservative	K. Dickenson	1,003	30.4%
Alliance	P. Boateng	283	8.6%
Turnout			41.6%
Labour hold			

=== Osmaston ===
Location of Osmaston ward

Osmaston
Party	Candidate	Votes	%
Labour	K. Bull	1,461	72.9%
Conservative	K. Lester	360	18.0%
Alliance	G. Colman	182	9.1%
Turnout			28.3%
Labour hold			

=== Sinfin ===
Location of Sinfin ward

Sinfin
Party	Candidate	Votes	%
Labour	A. Mullarkey	1,828	58.5%
Conservative	P. Foy	648	20.7%
Alliance	C. Moore	647	20.7%
Turnout			41.2%
Labour hold			

=== Spondon ===
Location of Spondon ward

Spondon
Party	Candidate	Votes	%
Conservative	M. Rowley	2,185	52.0%
Labour	M. Tanvir	1,146	27.3%
Alliance	J. Barnett	869	20.7%
Turnout			41.6%
Conservative hold			
