= 2008 Derby City Council election =

2008 UK local government election

← 2007	1 May 2008	2010 →

17 of 51 seats to Derby City Council 26 seats needed for a majority
	First party	Second party	Third party
Party	Liberal Democrats	Labour	Conservative
Last election	3	8	8
Seats before	3	8	8
Seats won	8	4	5
Seats after	18	17	14
Seat change	▲5	▼4	▼3
Popular vote	19,374	16,869	21,139
Percentage	32.3%	28.1%	35.2%
Swing	▲3.5%	▼6.1%	▲3.2%
Council control before election
No overall control
Council control after election
No overall control

The 2008 Derby City Council election took place on 1 May 2008 to elect members of Derby City Council in England. One third of the council was up for election and the council stayed under no overall control. Overall turnout was 34.6%.

After the election, the composition of the council was:

- Liberal Democrat 18
- Labour 17
- Conservative 14
- Independent 2

== Campaign ==
Since the 2006 election the Labour Party had been running the council in an agreement with the Conservatives and both parties did not rule out continuing this arrangement after the election. However, a major issue in the election was a proposal by the Labour Party to close 10 play areas across Derby in order to save money, which were opposed by the Conservatives. The arrangement was also strained by the defection of 2 Labour councillors, Hardial Dhamrait and Amar Nath, to the Conservatives since the 2007 election. Other changes since 2007 included Labour councillor Prem Chera becoming an independent, and independent Frank Leeming joining the Conservatives. This meant that before the election there were 21 Labour, 14 Conservative, 13 Liberal Democrat and 2 independent councillors.

In all 61 candidates stood in the election, with 17 seats being contested. Of those 17 seats Labour were defending 8, the Conservatives 6 and the Liberal Democrats 3.

The leader of the Conservative party, David Cameron, visited Derby to support the local party on 3 April and described it as a "key battleground".

== Election result ==
The Liberal Democrats gained 5 seats to move from third largest group on the council to become the largest party, overtaking the Labour and Conservative parties. Liberal Democrat gains were recorded in Abbey, Arboretum and Mackworth wards from Labour, and in Blagreaves and Oakwood wards from the Conservatives. Meanwhile, Labour recovered a seat in Sinfin which they had lost when Hardial Dhamrait had defected to the Conservatives. However, Labour also two seats in Chaddesden and Chellaston to the Conservatives.

Following the elections the three parties held discussions to decide who would run the council for the next two years. On 6 May the Conservatives decided that they would not agree any deal with the other two parties and would sit in opposition, with Conservative councillors feeling that the previous agreement with Labour had meant they did not make gains as the party had done nationally. The Liberal Democrats and Labour then planned to hold talks, with Labour abandoning their previous proposals to introduce congestion charging in Derby, and parking meters in Littleover. However, the Liberal Democrats decided they would prefer to run the council as a minority rather than reach an agreement with Labour. At the council meeting on 21 May the Liberal Democrat leader, Hilary Jones, was elected leader of the council by 19 votes to 17 after the Conservatives abstained.

2008 Derby local election result
Party	Seats	Gains	Losses	Net gain/loss	Seats %	Votes %	Votes	+/−
Liberal Democrats	8	5	0	▲5	47.1	32.3	19,374	▲3.5
Conservative	5	2	3	▼1	29.4	35.2	21,139	▲3.2
Labour	4	1	5	▼4	23.5	28.1	16,869	▼6.1
BNP	0	0	0	Steady	0.0	2.0	1,217	▲2.0
Independent	0	0	0	Steady	0.0	1.9	1,152	▼1.8
Green	0	0	0	Steady	0.0	0.5	319	▼0.8

== Ward results ==
=== Abbey ===
Location of Abbey ward

Abbey
Party	Candidate	Votes	%	±%
Liberal Democrats	David Batey	1,443	47.9	▲3.8
Labour	Asaf Afzal	1,056	35.1	▼3.9
Conservative	Jasvinder Rai	335	11.1	▼0.6
Independent	Norman Clayton	166	5.5	▲0.2
Independent	Masadiq Hussain	8	0.3	▲0.3
Independent	Raja Mehmood	3	0.1	▲0.1
Majority		387	12.8	▲7.7
Turnout		3,011	31.1	▲1.7
Liberal Democrats gain from Labour		Swing		

=== Allestree ===
Location of Allestree ward

Allestree
Party	Candidate	Votes	%	±%
Conservative	Philip Hickson	3,234	62.6	▼2.0
Labour	John Whitby	739	14.3	▼4.8
Liberal Democrats	Deena Smith	633	12.2	▼4.1
BNP	Glynn Cooper	563	10.9	▲10.9
Majority		2,495	48.3	▲2.8
Turnout		5,169	47.4	▲2.0
Conservative hold		Swing		

=== Alvaston ===
Location of Alvaston ward

Alvaston
Party	Candidate	Votes	%	±%
Labour	Alan Graves	1,228	38.3	▼7.1
Liberal Democrats	Naveed Hussain	913	28.5	▼6.3
Conservative	Brenda Longworth	843	26.3	▲6.5
Independent	Gillian Elks	221	6.9	▲6.9
Majority		315	9.8	▼0.8
Turnout		3,205	29.3	▼1.0
Labour hold		Swing		

=== Arboretum ===
Location of Arboretum ward

Arboretum
Party	Candidate	Votes	%	±%
Liberal Democrats	Farhatullah Khan	1,710	46.1	▲9.0
Labour	Shiraz Khan	1,624	43.8	▼5.3
Conservative	David Jennings	374	10.1	▲3.3
Majority		86	2.3	
Turnout		3,708	35.4	▼2.0
Liberal Democrats gain from Labour		Swing		

=== Blagreaves ===
Location of Blagreaves ward

Blagreaves
Party	Candidate	Votes	%	±%
Liberal Democrats	Harjinder Naitta	2,006	50.6	▲5.3
Conservative	Lisa Marshall	1,047	26.4	▲7.4
Labour	John Heavey	909	22.9	▼8.1
Majority		959	24.2	▲9.9
Turnout		3,962	41.6	▼1.5
Liberal Democrats gain from Conservative		Swing		

=== Boulton ===
Location of Boulton ward

Boulton
Party	Candidate	Votes	%	±%
Conservative	Graham Leeming	1,607	51.5	▲30.8
Labour	Joseph Russo	1,129	36.2	▼3.8
Liberal Democrats	Stephen Connolly	386	12.4	▲0.6
Majority		478	15.3	
Turnout		3,122	31.0	▼0.4
Conservative hold		Swing		

=== Chaddesden ===
Location of Chaddesden ward

Chaddesden
Party	Candidate	Votes	%	±%
Conservative	Sean Marshall	1,441	39.6	▼6.5
Labour	John Ahern	1,161	31.9	▼10.7
BNP	Paul Hilliard	654	18.0	▲18.0
Liberal Democrats	Eric Ashburner	285	7.8	▼3.5
Independent	Charles McLynn	96	2.6	▲2.6
Majority		280	7.7	▲4.2
Turnout		3,637	36.3	▲2.1
Conservative gain from Labour		Swing		

=== Chellaston ===
Location of Chellaston ward

Chellaston
Party	Candidate	Votes	%	±%
Conservative	Matthew Holmes	1,921	49.0	▲3.1
Labour	Mark Tittley	1,830	46.7	▲4.0
Liberal Democrats	Ajit Atwal	166	4.2	▼2.1
Majority		91	2.3	▼0.9
Turnout		3,917	35.9	▼1.3
Conservative gain from Labour		Swing		

=== Darley ===
Location of Darley ward

Darley
Party	Candidate	Votes	%	±%
Liberal Democrats	Finbar Richards	1,331	36.7	▲4.9
Conservative	Lorraine Radford	1,069	29.5	▲3.2
Labour	Christopher Wynn	905	25.0	▼7.7
Green	Jane Temple	319	8.8	▼0.4
Majority		262	7.2	
Turnout		3,624	33.9	▼6.1
Liberal Democrats hold		Swing		

=== Derwent ===
Location of Derwent ward

Derwent
Party	Candidate	Votes	%	±%
Labour	Margaret Redfern	919	39.9	▼10.6
Conservative	Patrick Fullerton	708	30.7	▲4.9
Liberal Democrats	Leigh Alcock	353	15.3	▲4.4
Independent	William Wright	325	14.1	▲1.2
Majority		211	9.2	▼15.5
Turnout		2,305	23.6	▲0.2
Labour hold		Swing		

=== Littleover ===
Location of Littleover ward

Littleover
Party	Candidate	Votes	%	±%
Liberal Democrats	Leslie Allen	2,429	60.8	▲5.6
Conservative	Tarlochan Dard	1,132	28.3	▼2.9
Labour	Linda Winter	435	10.9	▼2.7
Majority		1,297	32.5	▲8.5
Turnout		3,996	39.7	▼2.6
Liberal Democrats hold		Swing		

=== Mackworth ===
Location of Mackworth ward

Mackworth
Party	Candidate	Votes	%	±%
Liberal Democrats	Derrick Tuplin	1,553	52.9	▲27.1
Labour	Richard Gerrard	778	26.5	▼22.2
Conservative	Andrew Hill	603	20.6	▼4.9
Majority		775	26.4	N/A
Turnout		2,934	30.1	▲1.0
Liberal Democrats gain from Labour		Swing		

=== Mickleover ===
Location of Mickleover ward

Mickleover
Party	Candidate	Votes	%	±%
Liberal Democrats	Hilary Jones	2,411	53.0	▼2.5
Conservative	Philip Lucas	1,738	38.2	▲2.0
Labour	Josephine Drummond	402	8.8	▲0.4
Majority		673	14.8	▼4.5
Turnout		4,551	41.6	▼3.4
Liberal Democrats hold		Swing		

=== Normanton ===
Location of Normanton ward

Normanton
Party	Candidate	Votes	%	±%
Labour	Hardyal Dhindsa	1,399	40.6	▼8.1
Liberal Democrats	Shayad Mahmood	1,276	37.0	▼5.0
Conservative	Jarnail Birring	775	22.5	▲13.2
Majority		123	3.6	▼3.1
Turnout		3,450	33.5	▼0.7
Labour hold		Swing		

=== Oakwood ===
Location of Oakwood ward

Oakwood
Party	Candidate	Votes	%	±%
Liberal Democrats	Franklyn Harwood	1,733	51.9	▲44.0
Conservative	Hardial Dhamrait	974	29.2	▼15.7
Labour	Martina Longworth	632	18.9	▼4.6
Majority		759	22.7	N/A
Turnout		3,339	33.2	▲3.3
Liberal Democrats gain from Conservative		Swing		

=== Sinfin ===
Location of Sinfin ward

Sinfin
Party	Candidate	Votes	%	±%
Labour	Bhagat Shanker	973	37.1	▼18.5
Conservative	Michael Cook	941	35.9	▲11.0
Liberal Democrats	Louise Noble	374	14.3	▼5.3
Independent	Michael Whitehead	333	12.7	▲12.7
Majority		32	1.2	▼29.5
Turnout		2,621	27.3	▲2.5
Labour gain from Conservative		Swing		

=== Spondon ===
Location of Spondon ward

Spondon
Party	Candidate	Votes	%	±%
Conservative	Evonne Williams	2,397	68.1	▲3.6
Labour	Anne MacDonald	750	21.3	▼3.7
Liberal Democrats	Simon King	372	10.6	▲0.2
Majority		1,647	46.8	▲7.3
Turnout		3,519	36.3	▼1.0
Conservative hold		Swing		
