= 2014 Derby City Council election =

2014 UK local government election

← 2012	22 May 2014	2015 →

18 of the 51 seats to Derby City Council 26 seats needed for a majority
	First party	Second party
Party	Labour	Conservative
Last election	28	14
Seats before	27	14
Seats won	8	5
Seats after	27	14
Seat change	Steady	Steady
Popular vote	22,346	15,660
Percentage	36.3%	25.5%
	Third party	Fourth party
Party	Liberal Democrats	UKIP
Last election	9	0
Seats before	9	0
Seats won	3	2
Seats after	7	2
Seat change	▼2	▲2
Popular vote	9,101	13,740
Percentage	14.8%	22.3%
- Map showing the results of contested wards in the 2014 Derby City Council elections.
Council control before election
Labour
Council control after election
Labour

The 2014 Derby City Council election took place on 22 May 2014 to elect members of Derby City Council in England. This was on the same day as other local elections. The Labour Party remained in control of the council, with two gains and two losses resulting in no net change in its number of seats.

== Election results ==
2014 Derby City Council election
Party	Seats	Gains	Losses	Net gain/loss	Seats %	Votes %	Votes	+/−
Labour	8	2	2	Steady	44.4	36.3	22,346	▲1.9
Conservative	5	1	1	Steady	27.8	25.5	15,660	▼8.2
Liberal Democrats	3	0	2	▼2	16.7	14.8	9,101	▼12.4
UKIP	2	2	0	▲2	11.1	22.3	13,740	New
TUSC	0	0	0	Steady	0.0	0.6	372	New
Independent	0	0	0	Steady	0.0	0.4	271	▼1.1
BNP	0	0	0	Steady	0.0	0.4	220	▼2.3

All comparisons in vote share are to the corresponding 2010 election.

== Ward results ==
=== Abbey ===
Location of Abbey ward

Abbey (1 Seat)
Party	Candidate	Votes	%
Labour	Paul Thomas Hezelgrave	1,283	43.2
Liberal Democrats	Ajit Atwal	736	24.8
UKIP	Karen Gillian Bardoe	568	19.1
Conservative	Edward James Packham	384	12.9
Turnout			

=== Allestree ===
Location of Allestree ward

Allestree (1 Seat)
Party	Candidate	Votes	%
Conservative	Roy Webb	2,621	54.2
Labour	Diane Froggatt	998	20.6
UKIP	Frank Leeming	925	19.1
Liberal Democrats	Deena Smith	289	6.0
Turnout			

=== Alvaston ===
Location of Alvaston ward

Alvaston (1 Seat)
Party	Candidate	Votes	%
UKIP	Alan Graves	1,825	49.3
Labour	Linda Winter	1,219	32.9
Conservative	Peter Berry	474	12.8
Liberal Democrats	Jill Leonard	126	3.4
TUSC	Charles Albert Taylor	57	1.5
Turnout			

=== Arboretum ===
Location of Arboretum ward

Arboretum (1 Seat)
Party	Candidate	Votes	%
Labour	Shiraz Khan	2,298	56.2
Liberal Democrats	Nazir Hussain	1,116	27.3
UKIP	Kirk Lewis Kus	428	10.5
Conservative	Aamir Shahzad	243	6.0
Turnout			

=== Blagreaves ===
Location of Blagreaves ward

Blagreaves (1 Seat)
Party	Candidate	Votes	%
Liberal Democrats	Ruth Skelton	1,530	39.4
Labour	Amo Raju	1,342	34.6
UKIP	Richard Andrew Rogers	629	16.2
Conservative	Steve Willoughby	380	9.8
Turnout			

=== Boulton ===
Location of Boulton ward

Boulton (1 Seat)
Party	Candidate	Votes	%
Labour	Ranjit Banwait	1,446	46.0
UKIP	Stephen William Fowke	1,089	34.6
Conservative	David Rodney Jennings	521	16.6
Liberal Democrats	Brian Venn	89	2.8
Turnout			

=== Chaddesden ===
Location of Chaddesten ward

Chaddesden (1 Seat)
Party	Candidate	Votes	%
Labour	Sara Bolton	1,349	40.1
UKIP	Tony Crawley	987	29.4
Conservative	Nicola Angela Roulstone	728	21.6
Liberal Democrats	Karen Elizabeth Walsh	163	4.8
BNP	Paul Hilliard	136	4.0
Turnout			

=== Chellaston ===
Location of Chellaston ward

Chellaston (1 Seat)
Party	Candidate	Votes	%
Conservative	Philip Ingall	1,617	41.3
Labour	Alex Rowley-Kearns	1,211	30.9
UKIP	Ian Edward Crompton	918	23.4
Liberal Democrats	Martin Stuart Jones	170	4.3
Turnout			

=== Darley ===
Location of Darley ward

Darley (1 Seat)
Party	Candidate	Votes	%
Labour	Lisa Marie Eldret	1,554	40.9
Conservative	Steve Hassall	1,113	29.3
UKIP	Martin Du Sautoy	619	16.3
Liberal Democrats	Tracey Jane Wild	361	9.5
TUSC	Chris Fernandez	149	3.9
Turnout			

=== Derwent ===
Location of Derwent ward

Derwent (1 Seat)
Party	Candidate	Votes	%
UKIP	Bill Wright	884	32.4
Labour	Dave Roberts	847	31.1
Liberal Democrats	Richard Hudson	667	24.5
Conservative	Jonathan Charles Smale	245	9.0
BNP	Carol Tucker	84	3.1
Turnout			

=== Littleover ===
Location of Littleover ward

Littleover (2 Seats)
Party	Candidate	Votes	%
Liberal Democrats	Lucy Care	1,799	21.1
Liberal Democrats	Eric Ashburner	1,468	17.2
Labour	Simon Peter Parkes	1,315	15.4
Labour	Gurpal Singh	1,300	15.2
Conservative	Maxwell Craven	1,069	12.5
Conservative	Alan Grimadell	847	9.9
UKIP	Martin Ashley Bardoe	616	7.2
Independent	Tony Welch	120	1.4
Turnout			

=== Mackworth ===
Location of Mackworth ward

Mackworth (1 Seat)
Party	Candidate	Votes	%
Labour	John Whitby	1,089	40.7
UKIP	Mick Walsh	893	33.4
Conservative	Jordan Nigel Kemp	445	17.0
Liberal Democrats	Catrin Sian Rutland	240	9.0
Turnout			

=== Mickleover ===
Location of Mickleover ward

Mickleover (1 Seat)
Party	Candidate	Votes	%
Conservative	Alison Joyce Holmes	1,924	39.7
Liberal Democrats	Peter Barker	1,350	27.8
UKIP	Barry Peter Thomas Appleby	806	16.6
Labour	Lester John Pendrey	771	15.9
Turnout			

=== Normanton ===
Location of Normanton ward

Normanton (1 Seat)
Party	Candidate	Votes	%
Labour	Balbir Sandhu	2,619	74.7
UKIP	Adrian Carrington Ward	368	10.5
Conservative	Christopher Marc Ivor Batten	262	7.5
Liberal Democrats	Ian Care	190	5.4
TUSC	Graham Lewis	68	1.9
Turnout			

=== Oakwood ===
Location of Oakwood ward

Oakwood (1 Seat)
Party	Candidate	Votes	%
Conservative	Mick Barker	1,568	49.7
Labour	Neil Wilson	697	22.1
UKIP	Shaun Carl Walker	643	20.4
Independent	Deb Manzoori	151	4.8
Liberal Democrats	Roger Anthony Jackson	96	3.0
Turnout			

=== Sinfin ===
Location of Sinfin ward

Sinfin (1 Seat)
Party	Candidate	Votes	%
Labour	Robin Turner	1,488	56.0
UKIP	Vaughan Saxby	658	24.8
Conservative	Sarah Jane Burton	344	13.0
TUSC	Zbigniew Wojcik	98	3.7
Liberal Democrats	Glenda Anne Howcroft	67	2.5
Turnout			

=== Spondon ===
Location of Spondon ward

Spondon (1 Seat)
Party	Candidate	Votes	%
Conservative	Christopher Poulter	1,774	49.4
UKIP	Spencer Ross Austin	884	24.6
Labour	Steve Froggatt	820	22.8
Liberal Democrats	Alf Wall	112	3.1
Turnout			
