= 1995 Derby City Council election =

1995 UK local government election

← 1994	4 May 1995	1996 →

15 of the 44 seats in the Derby City Council 23 seats needed for a majority
	First party	Second party	Third party
Party	Labour	Conservative	Liberal Democrats
Last election	24	19	1
Seats before	25	18	1
Seats won	14	0	1
Seats after	30	12	2
Seat change	▲5	▼6	▲1
Popular vote	28,491	10,788	4,911
Percentage	63.9%	24.2%	11.0%
- Map showing the results of the 1995 Derby City Council elections.
Council control before election
Labour
Council control after election
Labour

The 1995 Derby City Council election took place on 4 May 1995 to elect members of Derby City Council in England. Local elections were held in the United Kingdom in 1995. This was on the same day as other local elections. The Labour Party retained control of the council.

== Overall results ==
1995 Derby City Council Election
Party	Seats	Gains	Losses	Net gain/loss	Seats %	Votes %	Votes	+/−
Labour	14	5	0	▲5	93.3	63.9	28,491	
Liberal Democrats	1	1	0	▲1	6.7	11.0	4,911	
Conservative	0	0	6	▼6	0.0	24.2	10,788	
Green	0	0	0	Steady	0.0	0.9	387	
SDP	0	0	0	Steady	0.0	0.1	44	
Total	15						44,621	

== Ward results ==
=== Abbey ===
Location of Abbey ward

Abbey
Party	Candidate	Votes	%
Labour	M. Ainsley	2,186	77.1%
Conservative	D. Sice	398	14.0%
Liberal Democrats	D. Lilley	252	8.9%
Turnout			29.0%
Labour hold			

=== Babington ===
Location of Babington ward

Babington
Party	Candidate	Votes	%
Labour	F. Hussain	1,681	74.9%
Conservative	J. Magee	236	10.5%
Liberal Democrats	M. Sherazi	173	7.7%
Green	L. Davies	154	6.9%
Turnout			30.6%
Labour hold			

=== Chaddesden ===
Location of Chaddesden ward

Chaddesden
Party	Candidate	Votes	%
Labour	K. Merry	2,347	70.0%
Conservative	M. Kilminster	726	21.6%
Liberal Democrats	L. Alcock	221	6.6%
Green	P. Chapman	61	1.8%
Turnout			40.2%
Labour hold			

=== Chellaston ===
Location of Chellaston ward

Chellaston
Party	Candidate	Votes	%
Labour	B. Jackson	2,197	56.7%
Conservative	J. Jennings	1,678	43.3%
Turnout			41.2%
Labour gain from Conservative			

=== Darley ===
Location of Darley ward

Darley
Party	Candidate	Votes	%
Labour	E. Woolley	2,017	49.5%
Conservative	P. Hickson	1,555	38.2%
Liberal Democrats	S. King	502	12.3%
Turnout			43.2%
Labour gain from Conservative			

=== Derwent ===
Location of Derwent ward

Derwent
Party	Candidate	Votes	%
Labour	D. Hayes	2,028	84.5%
Conservative	A. Pegg	372	15.5%
Turnout			32.1%
Labour hold			

=== Kingsway ===
Location of Kingsway ward

Kingsway
Party	Candidate	Votes	%
Labour	A. Graves	1,628	49.2%
Conservative	B. Maw	883	26.7%
Liberal Democrats	A. Crosby	799	24.1%
Turnout			44.4%
Labour gain from Conservative			

=== Litchurch ===
Location of Litchurch ward

Litchurch
Party	Candidate	Votes	%
Labour	J. McGiven	1,699	78.2%
Conservative	B. Samra	255	11.7%
Green	J. Macdonald	112	5.2%
Liberal Democrats	B. Sherazi	107	4.9%
Turnout			29.8%
Labour hold			

=== Littleover ===
Location of Littleover ward

Littleover
Party	Candidate	Votes	%
Liberal Democrats	E. Ashburner	1,581	45.5%
Labour	S. Bhalla	1,113	32.0%
Conservative	G. Shaw	737	21.2%
SDP	K. Dickenson	44	1.3%
Turnout			48.3%
Liberal Democrats gain from Conservative			

=== Mackworth ===
Location of Mackworth ward

Mackworth
Party	Candidate	Votes	%
Labour	R. Gerrard	2,121	81.3%
Conservative	J. Veitch	374	14.3%
Liberal Democrats	W. Savage	115	4.4%
Turnout			40.2%
Labour hold			

=== Mickleover ===
Location of Mickleover ward

Mickleover
Party	Candidate	Votes	%
Labour	P. Taylor	2,027	54.9%
Conservative	R. Broadfield	1,206	32.7%
Liberal Democrats	I. Care	456	12.4%
Turnout			42.1%
Labour gain from Conservative			

=== Normanton ===
Location of Normanton ward

Normanton
Party	Candidate	Votes	%
Labour	Chris Williamson	1,774	75.6%
Conservative	P. McCandless	349	14.9%
Liberal Democrats	A. Cooper	164	7.0%
Green	E. Wall	60	2.6%
Turnout			32.6%
Labour hold			

=== Osmaston ===
Location of Osmaston ward

Osmaston
Party	Candidate	Votes	%
Labour	M. Streets	1,217	82.6%
Conservative	G. Carran	159	10.8%
Liberal Democrats	R. Troup	97	6.6%
Turnout			25.1%
Labour hold			

=== Sinfin ===
Location of Sinfin ward

Sinfin
Party	Candidate	Votes	%
Labour	A. Mullarkey	1,934	81.6%
Conservative	J. Lee	234	9.9%
Liberal Democrats	P. Gale	202	8.5%
Turnout			31.0%
Labour hold			

=== Spondon ===
Location of Spondon ward

Spondon
Party	Candidate	Votes	%
Labour	C. Wilson	2,522	57.4%
Conservative	C. Brown	1,626	37.0%
Liberal Democrats	C. Harris	242	5.5%
Turnout			44.6%
Labour gain from Conservative			
