= 1984 Derby City Council election =

1984 UK local government election

← 1983	3 May 1984	1986 →

14 of the 44 seats in the Derby City Council 23 seats needed for a majority
	First party	Second party	Third party
Party	Labour	Conservative	Alliance
Last election	25	18	1
Seats won	7	6	1
Seats after	24	18	2
Seat change	▼1	Steady	▲1
Popular vote	17,330	19,078	6,810
Percentage	40.0%	44.0%	15.7%
- Map showing the results of the 1984 Derby City Council elections.
Council control before election
Labour
Council control after election
Labour

The 1984 Derby City Council election took place on 3 May 1984 to elect members of Derby City Council in England. This was on the same day as other local elections. 15 of the council's 44 seats were up for election. The Labour Party retained control of the council.

== Overall results ==
1984 Derby City Council Election
Party	Seats	Gains	Losses	Net gain/loss	Seats %	Votes %	Votes	+/−
Conservative	7	2	2	Steady	50.0	44.0	19,078	
Labour	6	2	3	▼1	42.9	40.0	17,330	
Alliance	1	1	0	▲1	7.1	15.7	6,810	
Ecology	0	0	0	Steady	0.0	0.3	119	
Total	14						43,337	

== Ward results ==
=== Abbey ===
Location of Abbey ward

Abbey
Party	Candidate	Votes	%
Labour	M. Fuller	1,508	58.5%
Conservative	M. Tomlinson	822	31.9%
Alliance	P. James	174	6.7%
Ecology	E. Wall	74	2.9%
Turnout			26.9%
Labour hold			

=== Allestree ===
Location of Allestree ward

Allestree
Party	Candidate	Votes	%
Conservative	B. Chadwick	2,601	70.0%
Alliance	H. Jones	574	15.5%
Labour	R. Turner	539	14.5%
Turnout			45.2%
Conservative hold			

=== Alvaston ===
Location of Alvaston ward

Alvaston
Party	Candidate	Votes	%
Labour	G. Sweeting	1,479	51.5%
Conservative	R. Baldwin	1,137	39.6%
Alliance	C. Brocklehurst	255	8.9%
Turnout			37.4%
Labour hold			

=== Babington ===
Location of Babington ward

Babington
Party	Candidate	Votes	%
Labour	S. Unwin	1,732	63.7%
Conservative	B. Thompson	670	24.7%
Alliance	M. Burgess	315	11.6%
Turnout			31.5%
Labour hold			

=== Blagreaves ===
Location of Blagreaves ward

Blagreaves
Party	Candidate	Votes	%
Conservative	F. Murphy	1,408	40.9%
Labour	M. Royle	1,282	37.2%
Alliance	D. George	710	20.6%
Ecology	B. Sabine	45	1.3%
Turnout			43.0%
Conservative gain from Labour			

=== Boulton ===
Location of Boulton ward

Boulton
Party	Candidate	Votes	%
Labour	C. Thrower	1,712	47.6%
Conservative	K. Webley	1,393	38.8%
Alliance	P. Boateng	488	13.6%
Turnout			38.4%
Labour gain from Conservative			

=== Breadsall ===
Location of Breadsall ward

Breadsall
Party	Candidate	Votes	%
Labour	M. Wawman	1,870	50.8%
Conservative	R. Ormond	1,167	31.7%
Alliance	P. Beasley	646	17.5%
Turnout			36.7%
Labour hold			

=== Chaddesden ===
Location of Chaddesden ward

Chaddesden
Party	Candidate	Votes	%
Labour	S. Bolton	1,643	46.0%
Conservative	G. Andrews	1,483	41.5%
Alliance	S. Connolly	446	12.5%
Turnout			40.6%
Labour hold			

=== Chellaston ===
Location of Chellaston ward

Chellaston
Party	Candidate	Votes	%
Conservative	K. Brown	1,977	54.8%
Labour	G. Summers	1,268	35.2%
Alliance	G. Coleman	362	10.0%
Turnout			44.0%
Conservative hold			

=== Darley ===
Location of Darley ward

Darley
Party	Candidate	Votes	%
Conservative	R. Longdon	2,273	62.7%
Labour	W. Denman	901	24.8%
Alliance	J. Hancock	453	12.5%
Turnout			38.7%
Conservative hold			

=== Derwent ===
Location of Derwent ward

Derwent
Party	Candidate	Votes	%
Alliance	P. Geraghty	1,401	46.1%
Labour	J. Wingfield	1,245	41.0%
Conservative	R. Bunting	391	12.9%
Turnout			40.1%
Alliance gain from Labour			

=== Kingsway ===
Location of Kingsway ward

Kingsway
Party	Candidate	Votes	%
Conservative	N. Brown	1,586	55.2%
Labour	D. Dorrell	747	26.0%
Alliance	P. Simpson	542	18.9%
Turnout			36.0%
Conservative hold			

=== Litchurch ===
Location of Litchurch ward

Litchurch
Party	Candidate	Votes	%
Labour	M. Wood	Unopposed	
Turnout			
Labour hold			

=== Spondon ===
Location of Spondon ward

Spondon
Party	Candidate	Votes	%
Conservative	J. Leatherbarrow	2,170	54.0%
Labour	D. Hayes	1,404	34.9%
Alliance	R. Guilford	444	11.1%
Turnout			39.8%
Conservative hold			
