= 2012 Derby City Council election =

2012 UK local government election

← 2011	3 May 2012	2014 →

17 of the 51 seats to Derby City Council 26 seats needed for a majority
	First party	Second party	Third party
Party	Labour	Conservative	Liberal Democrats
Seats before	22	16	12
Seats won	10	4	3
Seats after	28	14	9
Seat change	▲6	▼2	▼3
Popular vote	24,982	13,671	11,529
Percentage	44.7%	24.5%	20.6%
- Map showing the results of contested wards in the 2012 Derby City Council elections
Council control before election
No overall control
Council control after election
Labour

The 2012 Derby City Council election took place on 3 May 2012 to elect members of Derby City Council in England. The Labour Party gained control of the council, which had previously been under No Overall Control.

== Election results ==
2012 Derby City Council election
Party	Seats	Gains	Losses	Net gain/loss	Seats %	Votes %	Votes	+/−
Labour	10	6	0	▲6	58.8	44.7	24,982	▲16.6
Conservative	4	1	2	▼1	23.5	24.5	13,671	▼10.7
Liberal Democrats	3	0	5	▼5	17.6	20.6	11,529	▼11.7
UKIP	0	0	0	Steady	0.0	5.4	3,033	New
Green	0	0	0	Steady	0.0	3.0	1,667	▲2.5
BNP	0	0	0	Steady	0.0	1.8	1,031	▼0.2

All comparisons in vote share are to the corresponding 2008 election.

== Ward results ==
=== Abbey ===
Location of Abbey ward

Abbey (1 seat)
Party	Candidate	Votes	%
Labour	Sarah Elizabeth Russell	1,330	46.3
Liberal Democrats	Rehmat Khan	1,026	35.7
Conservative	John Cope	284	9.9
Green	Tom Reading	233	8.1
Turnout			
Labour gain from Liberal Democrats			

=== Allestree ===
Location of Allestree ward

Allestree (1 seat)
Party	Candidate	Votes	%
Conservative	Philip Hickson	2,040	47.2
Labour	Helen McCartney Butcher	1,289	29.8
UKIP	Martin Du Sautoy	647	15.0
Liberal Democrats	Peter Barker	179	4.1
Green	Jane Sarah Temple	172	4.0
Turnout			
Conservative hold			

=== Alvaston ===
Location of Alvaston ward

Alvaston (1 seat)
Party	Candidate	Votes	%
Labour	Mark Stuart Tittley	1,471	48.0
UKIP	Alan Wayne Graves	1,007	32.8
Conservative	Alan Leslie Grimadell	471	15.4
Liberal Democrats	John Edward Ahern	119	3.9
Turnout			
Labour hold			

=== Arboretum ===
Location of Arboretum ward

Arboretum (1 seat)
Party	Candidate	Votes	%
Labour	Gulfraz Nawaz	1,757	44.7
Liberal Democrats	Tullah Khan	1,743	44.3
Green	Simon Hales	248	6.3
Conservative	Ross McCristal	186	4.7
Turnout			
Labour gain from Liberal Democrats			

=== Blagreaves ===
Location of Blagreaves ward

Blagreaves (1 seat)
Party	Candidate	Votes	%
Liberal Democrats	Joe Singh Naitta	1,741	46.4
Labour	Michelle Joanne McFarlane	1,569	41.8
Conservative	Edward Montgomery Ashford	442	11.8
Turnout			
Liberal Democrats hold			

=== Boulton ===
Location of Boulton ward

Boulton (1 seat)
Party	Candidate	Votes	%
Labour	Alison Martin	1,720	56.6
Conservative	Frank Leeming	678	22.3
UKIP	Steve Fowke	445	14.6
Green	David Foster	123	4.0
Liberal Democrats	Kyle Martin	75	2.5
Turnout			
Labour gain from Conservative			

=== Chaddesden ===
Location of Chaddesten ward

Chaddesden (1 seat)
Party	Candidate	Votes	%
Labour	Anne MacDonald	1,689	54.2
Conservative	Steve Hassall	836	26.8
BNP	Paul Hilliard	459	14.7
Liberal Democrats	Ian Colin Deuchar Care	134	4.3
Turnout			
Labour gain from Conservative			

=== Chellaston ===
Location of Chellaston ward

Chellaston (1 seat)
Party	Candidate	Votes	%
Conservative	Matthew Edward Holmes	1,430	42.2
Labour	Paul Thomas Hezelgrave	1,394	41.2
UKIP	Paul Andrew Randle	458	13.5
Liberal Democrats	Nazir Hussain	105	3.1
Turnout			
Conservative hold			

=== Darley ===
Location of Darley ward

Darley (1 seat)
Party	Candidate	Votes	%
Labour	Jack Stanton	1,403	41.4
Conservative	John David Howard	841	24.8
Liberal Democrats	Finbar Richards	564	16.6
Green	David Clasby	375	11.1
UKIP	Ian Edward Crompton	205	6.0
Turnout			
Labour gain from Liberal Democrats			

=== Derwent ===
Location of Derwent ward

Derwent (1 seat)
Party	Candidate	Votes	%
Labour	Margaret Eileen Redfern	1,314	51.6
Liberal Democrats	Richard Hudson	689	27.1
BNP	Julie Fuller	302	11.9
Conservative	Nicola Angela Roulstone	239	9.4
Turnout			
Labour hold			

=== Littleover ===
Location of Littleover ward

Littleover (1 seat)
Party	Candidate	Votes	%
Liberal Democrats	Les Allen	1,615	44.2
Labour	Simon Peter Parkes	1,188	32.5
Conservative	Maxwell Arnold John Bradley Craven	853	23.3
Turnout			
Liberal Democrats hold			

=== Mackworth ===
Location of Mackworth ward

Mackworth (1 seat)
Party	Candidate	Votes	%
Labour	Paul Pegg	1,587	67.0
Conservative	Valerie Joan Taylor	377	15.9
Green	Katy Cheatham	231	9.8
Liberal Democrats	Catrin Sian Rutland	174	7.3
Turnout			
Labour gain from Liberal Democrats			

=== Mickleover ===
Location of Mickleover ward

Mickleover (1 seat)
Party	Candidate	Votes	%
Liberal Democrats	Hilary Jane Jones	1,807	40.3
Conservative	Alison Joyce Holmes	1,481	33.0
Labour	Lester John Pendrey	910	20.3
Green	Jean MacDonald	285	6.4
Turnout			
Liberal Democrats hold			

=== Normanton ===
Location of Normanton ward

Normanton (1 seat)
Party	Candidate	Votes	%
Labour	Hardyal Singh Dhindsa	2,092	61.0
Liberal Democrats	Muhammed Afsar	1,035	30.2
Conservative	Hardial Singh Dhamrait	305	8.9
Turnout			
Labour hold			

=== Oakwood ===
Location of Oakwood ward

Oakwood (1 seat)
Party	Candidate	Votes	%
Conservative	Frank Harwood	1,348	47.7
Labour	Neil Wilson	1,084	38.4
UKIP	Lee Allen	276	9.8
Liberal Democrats	Roger Anthony Jackson	116	4.1
Turnout			
Conservative gain from Liberal Democrats			

=== Sinfin ===
Location of Sinfin ward

Sinfin (1 seat)
Party	Candidate	Votes	%
Labour	Baggy Shanker	1,880	78.1
Conservative	Arron Mathew Marsden	273	11.3
Liberal Democrats	Kelly Anne Keenan	254	10.6
Turnout			
Labour hold			

=== Spondon ===
Location of Spondon ward

Spondon (1 seat)
Party	Candidate	Votes	%
Conservative	Evonne Williams	1,587	47.9
Labour	Steve Froggatt	1,305	39.4
BNP	Vanessa Griffin	270	8.1
Liberal Democrats	Simon Kirkman King	153	4.6
Turnout			
Conservative hold			
