= 2018 Derby City Council election =

2018 UK local government election

- 3 May 2018

17 of the 51 seats to Derby City Council 26 seats needed for a majority
	First party	Second party
Party	Labour	Conservative
Last election	26	17
Seats before	26	18
Seats won	5	8
Seats after	23	20
Seat change	▼3	▲2
Popular vote	21,264	27,447
Percentage	31.0%	39.1%
	Third party	Fourth party
Party	Liberal Democrats	UKIP
Last election	5	2
Seats before	5	1
Seats won	2	2
Seats after	5	3
Seat change	Steady	▲1
Popular vote	10,355	7,001
Percentage	15.1%	10.2%
- Map showing the results of contested wards in the 2018 Derby City Council elections.
Council control before election
Labour
Council control after election
No overall control

The 2018 Derby City Council election took place on 3 May 2018 to elect members of Derby City Council in England. This was on the same day as other local elections. The Labour group on the council suffered losses of both the Council Leader Ranjit Banwait and the mayor John Whitby, as well as then cabinet member Sara Bolton, who lost by over 1,000 votes to Conservative Rob Cooper. Labour lost its overall majority on the council, and a Conservative minority administration was formed with Liberal Democrat and UKIP backing.

== Election results ==
2018 Derby City Council election
Party	Seats	Gains	Losses	Net gain/loss	Seats %	Votes %	Votes	+/−
Conservative	8	3	0	▲3	47.1	39.1	27,447	▲13.6
Labour	5	0	3	▼3	29.4	31.0	21,264	▼5.3
Liberal Democrats	2	0	0	Steady	11.8	15.1	10,355	▲0.3
UKIP	2	1	1	Steady	11.8	10.2	7,001	▼12.1
Green	0	0	0	Steady	0.0	1.2	854	New
Independent	0	0	0	Steady	0.0	3.4	2,346	▲3.0

All comparisons in vote share are to the corresponding 2014 election.

== Ward results ==
=== Abbey ===
Location of Abbey ward

Abbey (1 Seat)
Party	Candidate	Votes	%	±%
Labour	Paul Hezelgrave	1,295	38.9	▼2.4
Liberal Democrats	Ajit Atwal	1,294	38.9	▲11.5
Conservative	Harvey Jennings	547	16.4	▲1.8
UKIP	Ann Graves	95	2.8	▼7.8
Green	Alice Joy	95	2.8	▼2.1
Majority		1	0.0	N/A
Turnout		3,326	35.2	▲5.9
Labour hold		Swing		

=== Allestree ===
Location of Allestree ward

Allestree (1 Seat)
Party	Candidate	Votes	%	±%
Conservative	Roy Webb	3,757	70.1	▲9.4
Labour	Cecile Wright	910	17.0	▲0.1
Liberal Democrats	Deena Smith	407	7.6	▼3.9
Green	Dan Holme	175	3.2	▲3.2
UKIP	David Adams	106	1.9	▼9.0
Majority		2,847	53.2	N/A
Turnout		5,355	48.5	▲6.4
Conservative hold		Swing		

=== Alvaston ===
Location of Alvaston ward

Alvaston (1 Seat)
Party	Candidate	Votes	%	±%
UKIP	Alan Graves	2,478	58.8	▲12.6
Labour	Thomas Spray	976	23.1	▼10.1
Conservative	Charnjeev Bolla	479	11.3	▼1.4
Green	Ian Sleeman	113	2.6	▲2.6
Liberal Democrats	Paul Lind	108	2.5	▼2.8
Independent	David Gale	57	1.3	▲0.1
Majority		1,502	35.7	▲22.6
Turnout		4,211	36.5	▲6.8
UKIP hold		Swing		

=== Arboretum ===
Location of Arboretum ward

Arboretum (1 Seat)
Party	Candidate	Votes	%
Labour	Shiraz Khan	2,356	57.0
Conservative	Matlub Hussain	1,356	33.0
Liberal Democrats	Krishan Raithatha	207	5.0
UKIP	Anthony Blaney	203	4.9
Turnout			
Labour hold			

=== Blagreaves ===
Location of Blagreaves ward

Blagreaves (1 Seat)
Party	Candidate	Votes	%
Liberal Democrats	Ruth Skelton	2,207	49.5
Labour	Farzana Khalid	1,439	32.3
Conservative	Maxwell Craven	704	15.8
UKIP	Richard Andrew Rogers	104	2.3
Turnout			
Liberal Democrats hold			

=== Boulton ===
Location of Boulton ward

Boulton (1 Seat)
Party	Candidate	Votes	%
UKIP	Paul Bettany	1,602	40.2
Labour	Ranjit Banwait (Incumbent)	1,128	28.3
Conservative	Gaurav Pandey	1,086	27.2
Liberal Democrats	Brian Venn	165	4.1
Turnout			
UKIP gain from Labour			

=== Chaddesden ===
Location of Chaddesden ward

Chaddesden (1 Seat)
Party	Candidate	Votes	%
Conservative	Rob Cooper	2,268	59.8
Labour	Sara Bolton (Incumbent)	1,205	31.8
UKIP	Carole Bradley	169	4.4
Liberal Democrats	Glenda Howcroft	147	3.8
Turnout			
Conservative gain from Labour			

=== Chellaston ===
Location of Chellaston ward

Chellaston (1 Seat)
Party	Candidate	Votes	%
Conservative	Ross McCristal	1,829	36.8
Independent	Philip Ingall (Incumbent)	1,797	36.2
Labour	Steve Lapsley	906	18.2
UKIP	Kate Mosley	182	3.6
Liberal Democrats	Jane Webb	160	3.2
Green	John Hill	84	1.6
Turnout			
Conservative hold			

=== Darley ===
Location of Darley ward

Darley (1 Seat)
Party	Candidate	Votes	%
Labour	Lisa Eldret	1,739	42.4
Conservative	Miles Pattison	1,674	40.8
Liberal Democrats	Niall Garratt	475	11.5
UKIP	Jennifer Palmer	110	2.6
Green	James Lasner	103	2.5
Turnout			
Labour hold			

=== Derwent ===
Location of Derwent ward

Derwent (1 Seat)
Party	Candidate	Votes	%
Conservative	Steve Willoughby	1,600	54.8
Labour	Lucy Rigby	977	33.4
UKIP	Andrew Bennett	192	6.5
Liberal Democrats	Simon Ferrigno	150	5.1
Turnout			
Conservative hold			

Note: Derwent ward was won by UKIP at the previous regular election in 2014, but gained by the Conservatives in a by-election on 9 March 2017.

=== Littleover ===
Location of Littleover ward

Littleover (1 Seat)
Party	Candidate	Votes	%
Liberal Democrats	Lucy Care	2,443	50.6
Labour	Jamie D'Arcy	1,309	27.1
Conservative	Jordan Kemp	962	19.9
UKIP	Douglas Lumley	88	1.8
Independent	Tony Welch	23	0.4
Turnout			
Liberal Democrats hold			

=== Mackworth ===
Location of Mackworth ward

Mackworth (1 Seat)
Party	Candidate	Votes	%
Conservative	Adrian Pegg	1,233	41.2
Labour	John Whitby (Incumbent)	943	31.5
Liberal Democrats	Tom Bull	513	17.1
UKIP	Freddie Theobald	176	5.8
Green	Naomi Wilds	125	4.1
Turnout			
Conservative gain from Labour			

=== Mickleover ===
Location of Mickleover ward

Mickleover (1 Seat)
Party	Candidate	Votes	%
Conservative	Alison Holmes	3,296	60.4
Liberal Democrats	Maggie Hird	1,427	26.1
Labour	Jyoti Wilkinson	622	11.4
UKIP	Barry Appleby	106	1.9
Turnout			
Conservative hold			

=== Normanton ===
Location of Normanton ward

Normanton (1 Seat)
Party	Candidate	Votes	%
Labour	Balbir Sandhu	2,631	70.2
Conservative	Habib Iqbal	654	17.4
Liberal Democrats	Preetinder Butter	257	6.8
UKIP	Derek Reynolds	202	5.3
Turnout			
Labour hold			

=== Oakwood ===
Location of Oakwood ward

Oakwood (1 Seat)
Party	Candidate	Votes	%
Conservative	Mick Barker	2,328	62.8
Labour	Neil Wilson	609	16.4
Independent	Alex Dann	469	12.6
UKIP	Gary Small	199	5.3
Liberal Democrats	David Batey	101	2.7
Turnout			
Conservative hold			

=== Sinfin ===
Location of Sinfin ward

Sinfin (1 Seat)
Party	Candidate	Votes	%
Labour	Nadine Peatfield	1,542	55.0
Conservative	Jay Joshi	869	31.0
UKIP	Roger Adcock	218	7.7
Liberal Democrats	John-Paul Keane	171	6.1
Turnout			
Labour hold			

=== Spondon ===
Location of Spondon ward

Spondon (1 Seat)
Party	Candidate	Votes	%
Conservative	Christopher Poulter	2,796	71.2
Labour	Michael Winfield	677	17.2
UKIP	Maureen Hodgetts	171	4.3
Green	Vic Wood	159	4.0
Liberal Democrats	Simon King	123	3.1
Turnout			
Conservative hold			
