= 2011 Derby City Council election =

2011 UK local government election

← 2010	5 May 2011	2012 →

19 of the 51 seats to Derby City Council 26 seats needed for a majority
	First party	Second party	Third party
Party	Labour	Conservative	Liberal Democrats
Last election	17	16	16
Seats before	17	18	15
Seats won	12	5	2
Seats after	22	16	12
Seat change	▲5	▼2	▼3
Popular vote	36,384	22,151	13,557
Percentage	48.0%	29.2%	17.9%
- Map showing the results of contested wards in the 2011 Derby City Council elections.
Council control before election
No overall control
Council control after election
No overall control

The 2011 Derby City Council election took place on 5 May 2011 to elect members of Derby City Council in England. The council remained under No Overall Control.

== Election results ==
2011 Derby City Council election
Party	Seats	Gains	Losses	Net gain/loss	Seats %	Votes %	Votes	+/−
Labour	12	3	0	▲3	63.2	48.0	36,384	▲13.8
Conservative	5	1	1	Steady	26.3	29.2	22,151	▼2.8
Liberal Democrats	2	0	3	▼3	10.5	17.9	13,557	▼10.9
BNP	0	0	0	Steady	0.0	2.3	1,586	New
Green	0	0	0	Steady	0.0	1.8	1,220	▼0.5
UKIP	0	0	0	Steady	0.0	1.0	743	New
Independent	0	0	0	Steady	0.0	0.2	131	▼3.5

All comparisons in vote share are to the corresponding 2007 election.

== Ward results ==
=== Abbey ===
Location of Abbey ward

Abbey (2 Seats)
Party	Candidate	Votes	%
Labour	Asaf Afzal	1,862	30.3
Labour	Sarah Elizabeth Russell	1,534	24.9
Liberal Democrats	Bryan Lowe	717	11.6
Liberal Democrats	John Edward Ahern	612	9.9
Conservative	Lisa Jane Marshall	590	9.6
Conservative	Neelam Cartmell	498	8.1
Green	Thomas Josef Reading	341	5.5
Turnout			
Labour gain from Liberal Democrats			
Labour gain from Liberal Democrats			

=== Allestree ===
Location of Allestree ward

Allestree (1 Seat)
Party	Candidate	Votes	%
Conservative	Saadia Davis	3,486	59.9
Labour	Jack Stanton	1,756	30.2
Liberal Democrats	Deena Smith	579	10.0
Turnout			
Conservative hold			

=== Alvaston ===
Location of Alvaston ward

Alvaston (1 Seat)
Party	Candidate	Votes	%
Labour	Paul Bayliss	2,143	59.0
Conservative	Gerald Potter	891	24.5
UKIP	David Gale	418	11.5
Liberal Democrats	Thanh Don Yung	180	5.0
Turnout			
Labour hold			

=== Arboretum ===
Location of Arboretum ward

Arboretum (1 Seat)
Party	Candidate	Votes	%
Labour	Fareed Hussain	2,182	49.9
Liberal Democrats	Rehmat Khan	1,539	35.2
Conservative	John David Howard	366	8.4
Green	Jane Sarah Temple	286	6.5
Turnout			
Labour hold			

=== Blagreaves ===
Location of Blagreaves ward

Blagreaves (1 Seat)
Party	Candidate	Votes	%
Liberal Democrats	Bob Troup	2,102	50.6
Labour	Michelle Joanne McFarlane	2,050	49.4
Turnout			
Liberal Democrats hold			

=== Boulton ===
Location of Boulton ward

Boulton (1 Seat)
Party	Candidate	Votes	%
Labour	Barbara Jackson	2,040	55.4
Conservative	Brenda Jean Longworth	1,010	27.4
UKIP	Stephen William Fowke	325	8.8
Green	David Leonard Foster	161	4.4
Liberal Democrats	Kyle Martin	144	3.9
Turnout			
Labour hold			

=== Chaddesden ===
Location of Chaddesten ward

Chaddesden (1 Seat)
Party	Candidate	Votes	%
Labour	Paul Terence Campbell	1,988	50.8
Conservative	Alan Leslie Grimadell	1,307	33.4
BNP	Paul Hilliard	413	10.6
Liberal Democrats	Ian Colin Deuchar Care	202	5.2
Turnout			
Labour gain from Conservative			

=== Chellaston ===
Location of Chellaston ward

Chellaston (1 Seat)
Party	Candidate	Votes	%
Conservative	Philip John Bailey	2,462	55.7
Labour	Robyn Joy Sewter	1,676	37.9
Liberal Democrats	Sonia Atwal	285	6.4
Turnout			
Conservative hold			

=== Darley ===
Location of Darley ward

Darley (1 Seat)
Party	Candidate	Votes	%
Labour	Martin Jeffrey Repton	2,071	46.3
Conservative	Steve Hassall	1,439	32.2
Liberal Democrats	Peter Barker	530	11.8
Green	David Edward Morys Clasby	432	9.7
Turnout			
Labour hold			

=== Derwent ===
Location of Derwent ward

Derwent (1 Seat)
Party	Candidate	Votes	%
Labour	Martin James Rawson	1,632	55.8
Conservative	Lisa Harper	657	22.4
BNP	Lou Fuller	370	12.6
Liberal Democrats	Richard Hudson	267	9.1
Turnout			
Labour hold			

=== Littleover ===
Location of Littleover ward

Littleover (1 Seat)
Party	Candidate	Votes	%
Liberal Democrats	Mike Carr	1,854	39.6
Conservative	Maxwell Craven	1,528	32.6
Labour	Shazia Parveen	1,306	27.9
Turnout			
Liberal Democrats hold			

=== Mackworth ===
Location of Mackworth ward

Mackworth (1 Seat)
Party	Candidate	Votes	%
Labour	Lisa Maria Higginbottom	1,756	55.3
Conservative	Valerie Taylor	620	19.5
Liberal Democrats	Catrin Sian Rutland	462	14.6
BNP	Carol Pearl Tucker	336	10.6
Turnout			
Labour hold			

=== Mickleover ===
Location of Mickleover ward

Mickleover (1 Seat)
Party	Candidate	Votes	%
Conservative	John Harold Keith	2,026	37.4
Liberal Democrats	Maggie Hird	1,860	34.4
Labour	Lester John Pendrey	1,310	24.2
BNP	Raymond Herbert Dixon	216	4.0
Turnout			
Conservative gain from Liberal Democrats			

=== Normanton ===
Location of Normanton ward

Normanton (2 Seats)
Party	Candidate	Votes	%
Labour	Jangir Khan	3,006	37.4
Labour	Balbir Singh Sandhu	2,776	34.6
Liberal Democrats	Shayad Mahmood	862	10.7
Liberal Democrats	Dawn Glenis Gee	622	7.8
Conservative	Ashley Waterhouse	395	4.9
Conservative	Ross McCristal	367	4.6
Turnout			
Labour hold			
Labour hold			

=== Oakwood ===
Location of Oakwood ward

Oakwood (1 Seat)
Party	Candidate	Votes	%
Conservative	Robin John Wood	1,788	49.0
Labour	Neil Wilson	1,525	41.8
Liberal Democrats	Roger Anthony Jackson	335	9.2
Turnout			
Conservative hold			

=== Sinfin ===
Location of Sinfin ward

Sinfin (1 Seat)
Party	Candidate	Votes	%
Labour	Karen Hillier	2,101	69.0
Conservative	Hardial Singh Dhamrait	639	21.0
Liberal Democrats	Sucha Singh Atwal	176	5.8
Not a Member of any Political Group	Steven Phillip Powell	131	4.3
Turnout			
Labour hold			

=== Spondon ===
Location of Spondon ward

Spondon (1 Seat)
Party	Candidate	Votes	%
Conservative	Harvey Jennings	2,082	49.2
Labour	Richard Morgan	1,670	39.5
BNP	Vanessa Margaret Ann Griffin	251	5.9
Liberal Democrats	Simon Kirkman King	229	5.4
Turnout			
Conservative hold			
