= 2010 Derby City Council election =

2010 UK local government election

← 2008	6 May 2010	2011 →

17 of the 51 seats to Derby City Council 26 seats needed for a majority
	First party	Second party	Third party
Party	Labour	Conservative	Liberal Democrats
Last election	17	14	18
Seats before	15	15	19
Seats won	12	5	2
Seats after	17	16	16
Seat change	▲2	▲1	▼3
Popular vote	36,384	22,151	13,557
Percentage	48.0%	29.2%	17.9%
- Map showing the results of contested wards in the 2010 Derby City Council elections.
Council control before election
No overall control
Council control after election
No overall control

The 2010 Derby City Council election took place on 5 May 2010 to elect members of Derby City Council in England. One third of the council was up for election and the council remained under No Overall Control.

== Election result ==
2010 Derby City Council Election
Party	Seats	Gains	Losses	Net gain/loss	Seats %	Votes %	Votes	+/−
Labour	8	2	1	▲1	47.1	34.4	37,747	▲0.1
Conservative	5	2	0	▲2	29.4	33.7	36,908	▲1.7
Liberal Democrats	4	0	3	▼3	23.5	27.2	29,767	▼2.7
BNP	0	0	0	Steady	0.0	2.7	2,908	New
Independent	0	0	0	Steady	0.0	1.5	1,641	▼0.2
Green	0	0	0	Steady	0.0	0.6	695	▼1.4

All comparisons in vote share are to the corresponding 2006 election.

== Ward results ==
=== Abbey ===
Location of Abbey ward

Abbey (1 Seat)
Party	Candidate	Votes	%
Liberal Democrats	Ajit Atwal	2,114	38.2
Labour	Afzal Asaf	2,106	38.1
Conservative	David Taylor	1,313	23.7
Turnout			
Liberal Democrats hold			

=== Allestree ===
Location of Allestree ward

Allestree (1 Seat)
Party	Candidate	Votes	%
Conservative	Roy Michael Webb	4,908	58.7
Liberal Democrats	Deena Smith	1,841	22.0
Labour	Robyn Joy Sewter	1,608	19.3
Turnout			
Conservative hold			

=== Alvaston ===
Location of Alvaston ward

Alvaston (1 Seat)
Party	Candidate	Votes	%
Labour	Linda Mary Winter	2,344	37.9
Conservative	Gerald Desmond Potter	1,590	25.7
Liberal Democrats	Gill Withers	1,430	23.1
Independent	Kevin Winson	823	13.3
Turnout			
Labour gain from Liberal Democrats			

=== Arboretum ===
Location of Arboretum ward

Arboretum (1 Seat)
Party	Candidate	Votes	%
Labour	Shiraz Khan	2,732	48.8
Liberal Democrats	Rehmat Khan	2,132	38.0
Conservative	Ashley Waterhouse	739	13.2
Turnout			
Labour gain from Liberal Democrats			

=== Blagreaves ===
Location of Blagreaves ward

Blagreaves (1 Seat)
Party	Candidate	Votes	%
Liberal Democrats	Ruth Skelton	3,145	47.2
Labour	Shaz Parveen	1,947	29.2
Conservative	Singh Dard Tarlochan	1,566	23.5
Turnout			
Liberal Democrats hold			

=== Boulton ===
Location of Boulton ward

Boulton (1 Seat)
Party	Candidate	Votes	%
Labour	Ranjit Banwait	3,410	55.6
Conservative	Phil Bailey	1,689	27.5
Liberal Democrats	Kyle Martin David	824	13.4
Green	David Leonard Foster	213	3.5
Turnout			
Labour hold			

=== Chaddesden ===
Location of Chaddesten ward

Chaddesden (1 Seat)
Party	Candidate	Votes	%
Labour	Sara Frances Bolton	2,614	40.9
Conservative	Steve Hassell	2,161	33.8
Liberal Democrats	Roger Anthony Jackson	879	13.8
BNP	Paul Hilliard	733	11.5
Turnout			
Labour hold			

=== Chellaston ===
Location of Chellaston ward

Chellaston (1 Seat)
Party	Candidate	Votes	%
Conservative	Phil Ingall	3,626	48.9
Labour	Andy Findlay	2,439	32.9
Liberal Democrats	Waleed Hussain	946	12.7
Independent	Paul Randle	412	5.6
Turnout			
Conservative gain from Labour			

=== Darley ===
Location of Darley ward

Darley (1 Seat)
Party	Candidate	Votes	%
Conservative	Lorraine Mary Radford	2,608	36.9
Liberal Democrats	Julie Dorothy Cooper	2,176	30.8
Labour	Richard Leslie Felix	1,799	25.5
Green	Jane Sarah Temple	482	6.8
Turnout			
Conservative gain from Liberal Democrats			

=== Derwent ===
Location of Derwent ward

Derwent (1 Seat)
Party	Candidate	Votes	%
Labour	Dave Roberts	2,164	42.5
Conservative	Lisa Ann Harper	1,333	26.2
Liberal Democrats	John Edward Ahern	968	20.0
BNP	Alex Johnstone	633	12.4
Turnout			
Labour hold			

=== Littleover ===
Location of Littleover ward

Littleover (1 Seat)
Party	Candidate	Votes	%
Liberal Democrats	Eric Ashburner	3,156	41.5
Conservative	Maxwell Craven	2,450	32.3
Labour	Karen Hillier-Smith	1,991	26.2
Turnout			
Liberal Democrats hold			

=== Mackworth ===
Location of Mackworth ward

Mackworth (1 Seat)
Party	Candidate	Votes	%
Labour	John Michael Whitby	2,055	36.7
Liberal Democrats	Catrin Sian Rutland	1,547	27.6
Conservative	Adrian Pegg	1,446	25.8
BNP	Raymond Herbert Dixon	554	9.9
Turnout			
Labour hold			

=== Mickleover ===
Location of Mickleover ward

Mickleover (1 Seat)
Party	Candidate	Votes	%
Liberal Democrats	Fay Winter	3,342	40.3
Conservative	John Harold Keith	2,984	36.0
Labour	Lester John Pendrey	1,549	18.7
BNP	Jonathan Barlow	411	5.0
Turnout			
Liberal Democrats hold			

=== Normanton ===
Location of Normanton ward

Normanton (1 Seat)
Party	Candidate	Votes	%
Labour	Chris Williamson	2,859	52.3%
Liberal Democrats	Tafseer Habib	1,566	28.7%
Conservative	Lisa Jane Marshall	881	16.1%
Independent	Zbigniew Wójcik	156	2.9%
Turnout			
Labour hold			

=== Oakwood ===
Location of Oakwood ward

Oakwood (1 Seat)
Party	Candidate	Votes	%
Conservative	Mick Barker	3,131	47.0%
Liberal Democrats	Gary Bélà Horvath	1,804	27.1%
Labour	Richard Thomas Gerrard	1,732	26.0%
Turnout			
Conservative hold			

=== Sinfin ===
Location of Sinfin ward

Sinfin (1 Seat)
Party	Candidate	Votes	%
Labour	Robin Cyril Turner	2,446	50.1%
Conservative	Mike Cook	1,335	27.3%
Liberal Democrats	Russell Hastie	853	17.5%
Independent	Steve Powell	250	5.1%
Turnout			
Labour hold			

=== Spondon ===
Location of Spondon ward

Spondon (1 Seat)
Party	Candidate	Votes	%
Conservative	Christopher Paul Poulter	3,148	47.0%
Labour	Richard Morgan	1,952	29.2%
Liberal Democrats	Simon Kirkman King	1,044	15.6%
BNP	Stephen Roland Hill	547	8.2%
Turnout			
Conservative hold			

== Notes and references ==
Notes
