= 2007 Derby City Council election =

2007 UK local government election

← 2006	3 May 2007	2008 →

17 of 51 seats to Derby City Council 26 seats needed for a majority
	First party	Second party	Third party
Party	Labour	Liberal Democrats	Conservative
Last election	24	15	11
Seats before	24	14	11
Seats won	8	5	4
Seats after	24	13	12
Seat change	Steady	▼1	▲1
Popular vote	20,593	17,393	19,272
Percentage	34.2%	28.8%	32.0%
Swing	▼0.1%	▼1.1%	0.0%
Council control before election
No overall control
Council control after election
No overall control

The 2007 Derby City Council election took place on 3 May 2007 to elect members of Derby City Council in England. One third of the council was up for election and the council stayed under no overall control.

The election saw the Conservative Party gain a seat in Chaddesden from the Labour Party. The Labour Party gained one in Darley from the Liberal Democrats. Following the election Labour continued to run the council after they and the Conservatives agreed to continue their agreement, with the Conservatives retaining 3 seats in the cabinet.

After the election, the composition of the council was:

- Labour 24
- Liberal Democrat 13
- Conservative 12
- Independent 2

== Election result ==
2007 Derby local election result
Party	Seats	Gains	Losses	Net gain/loss	Seats %	Votes %	Votes	+/−
Labour	8	1	1	Steady	47.1	34.2	20,593	▲2.7
Conservative	5	1	0	▲1	29.4	32.0	19,272	▲1.4
Liberal Democrats	4	0	1	▼1	23.5	28.8	17,393	▼2.1
Independent	0	0	0	Steady	0.0	3.7	2,237	▼3.3
Green	0	0	0	Steady	0.0	1.3	806	New

== Ward results ==
=== Abbey ===
Location of Abbey ward

Abbey
Party	Candidate	Votes	%	±%
Liberal Democrats	Bryan Lowe	1,237	44.1	▼1.7
Labour	Jaz Greer	1,093	39.0	▲1.0
Conservative	Andrew Hill	327	11.7	▲1.7
Independent	Norman Clayton	149	5.3	▲5.3
Majority		144	5.1	▼2.7
Turnout		2,806	29.4	▲2.7
Liberal Democrats hold		Swing		

=== Allestree ===
Location of Allestree ward

Allestree
Party	Candidate	Votes	%	±%
Conservative	Steve Willoughby	3,172	64.6	▼0.6
Labour	Frank Kirkland	940	19.1	▼0.3
Liberal Democrats	Simon King	801	16.3	▲0.9
Majority		2,232	45.5	▼0.3
Turnout		4,913	45.4	▼0.9
Conservative hold		Swing		

=== Alvaston ===
Location of Alvaston ward

Alvaston
Party	Candidate	Votes	%	±%
Labour	Paul Bayliss	1,513	45.4	▲9.0
Liberal Democrats	Naveed Hussain	1,158	34.8	▲8.4
Conservative	Alison Hayes	660	19.8	▲5.4
Majority		355	10.6	
Turnout		3,331	30.3	▼1.6
Labour hold		Swing		

=== Arboretum ===
Location of Arboretum ward

Arboretum
Party	Candidate	Votes	%	±%
Labour	Fareed Hussain	1,936	49.1	▲8.0
Liberal Democrats	Masud Akhtar	1,461	37.1	▼5.9
Conservative	Douglas Sice	270	6.8	▼9.1
Green	Jane Temple	162	4.1	▲4.1
Independent	Josephine Rooney	114	2.9	▲2.9
Majority		475	12.0	
Turnout		3,943	37.4	▲2.0
Labour hold		Swing		

=== Blagreaves ===
Location of Blagreaves ward

Blagreaves
Party	Candidate	Votes	%	±%
Liberal Democrats	Bob Troup	1,885	45.3	▼3.2
Labour	Baggy Shanker	1,292	31.0	▲1.1
Conservative	Lisa Marshall	792	19.0	▲2.2
Green	Clare Shelton	194	4.7	▼0.1
Majority		593	14.3	▼4.3
Turnout		4,163	43.1	▼1.9
Liberal Democrats hold		Swing		

=== Boulton ===
Location of Boulton ward

Boulton
Party	Candidate	Votes	%	±%
Labour	Barbara Jackson	1,269	40.0	▼6.2
Independent	Brenda Longworth	870	27.5	▲5.6
Conservative	David Jennings	656	20.7	▼0.3
Liberal Democrats	Grahame Elson	374	11.8	▲0.9
Majority		399	12.5	▼11.8
Turnout		3,169	31.4	▼2.2
Labour hold		Swing		

=== Chaddesden ===
Location of Chaddesten ward

Chaddesden
Party	Candidate	Votes	%	±%
Conservative	Alan Grimadell	1,588	46.1	▲7.4
Labour	Anne MacDonald	1,468	42.6	▼4.2
Liberal Democrats	David Batey	388	11.3	▼3.2
Majority		120	3.5	N/A
Turnout		3,444	34.2	▲0.4
Conservative gain from Labour		Swing		

=== Chellaston ===
Location of Chellaston ward

Chellaston
Party	Candidate	Votes	%	±%
Conservative	Harvey Jennings	1,828	45.9	▲0.5
Labour	Linda Winter	1,699	42.7	▼2.9
Liberal Democrats	Stephen Connolly	252	6.3	▼2.7
Independent	David Black	201	5.1	▲5.1
Majority		129	3.2	
Turnout		3,980	37.2	▼0.1
Conservative hold		Swing		

=== Darley ===
Location of Darley ward

Darley
Party	Candidate	Votes	%	±%
Labour	Martin Repton	1,198	32.7	Steady
Liberal Democrats	Roger Jackson	1,168	31.8	▼4.6
Conservative	Lorraine Radford	964	26.3	▲4.6
Green	David Clasby	338	9.2	▲0.1
Majority		30	0.9	N/A
Turnout		3,668	40.0	▼1.2
Labour gain from Liberal Democrats		Swing		

=== Derwent ===
Location of Derwent ward

Derwent
Party	Candidate	Votes	%	±%
Labour	Martin Rawson	1,170	50.5	▲2.5
Conservative	Philip Lucas	598	25.8	▼1.8
Independent	William Wright	299	12.9	▲0.2
Liberal Democrats	Leigh Alcock	252	10.9	▼0.8
Majority		572	24.7	▲4.3
Turnout		2,319	23.4	▲5.9
Labour hold		Swing		

=== Littleover ===
Location of Littleover ward

Littleover
Party	Candidate	Votes	%	±%
Liberal Democrats	Mike Carr	2,359	55.2	▼6.1
Conservative	Mike Cook	1,333	31.2	▲6.3
Labour	Linda McGraw	583	13.6	▼0.2
Majority		1,026	24.0	▼12.4
Turnout		4,275	42.3	▼1.5
Liberal Democrats hold		Swing		

=== Mackworth ===
Location of Mackworth ward

Mackworth
Party	Candidate	Votes	%	±%
Labour	Lisa Higginbottom	1,325	48.7	▼1.1
Liberal Democrats	Simon Lyszczenko	702	25.8	▲3.1
Conservative	Andrew Brown	692	25.5	▼2.1
Majority		623	22.9	▲0.7
Turnout		2,719	29.1	▼0.3
Labour hold		Swing		

=== Mickleover ===
Location of Mickleover ward

Mickleover
Party	Candidate	Votes	%	±%
Liberal Democrats	Maggie Hird	2,758	55.5	▲7.6
Conservative	Matthew Holmes	1,797	36.2	▼3.8
Labour	Joga Thind	415	8.4	▼3.7
Majority		961	19.3	▲11.4
Turnout		4,970	45.0	▼0.9
Liberal Democrats hold		Swing		

=== Normanton ===
Location of Normanton ward

Normanton
Party	Candidate	Votes	%	±%
Labour	Amar Nath	1,764	48.7	▼4.8
Liberal Democrats	Abdul Majid	1,522	42.0	▲14.9
Conservative	Jawaid Iqbal	336	9.3	▼10.1
Majority		242	6.7	▼19.7
Turnout		3,622	34.2	▲2.6
Labour hold		Swing		

=== Oakwood ===
Location of Oakwood ward

Oakwood
Party	Candidate	Votes	%	±%
Conservative	Robin Wood	1,358	44.9	▼11.9
Labour	Phil Woodhead	711	23.5	▼1.8
Independent	Frank Harwood	604	20.0	▲20.0
Liberal Democrats	Eric Ashburner	238	7.9	▼2.4
Green	Stephen Shelton	112	3.7	▼3.9
Majority		647	21.4	▼10.1
Turnout		3,023	29.9	▼1.1
Conservative hold		Swing		

=== Sinfin ===
Location of Sinfin ward

Sinfin
Party	Candidate	Votes	%	±%
Labour	Prem Chera	1,321	55.6	▼3.1
Conservative	Patrick Fullarton	592	24.9	▲8.5
Liberal Democrats	Joe Naitta	465	19.6	▼5.3
Majority		729	30.7	▼3.1
Turnout		2,378	24.8	▲0.2
Labour hold		Swing		

=== Spondon ===
Location of Spondon ward

Spondon
Party	Candidate	Votes	%	±%
Conservative	Peter Berry	2,309	64.5	▲6.9
Labour	Chris Wynn	896	25.0	▼2.6
Liberal Democrats	John-Paul Keane	373	10.4	▼4.4
Majority		1,413	39.5	▲9.5
Turnout		3,578	37.3	▼2.6
Conservative hold		Swing		
