= 2006 Derby City Council election =

2006 UK local government election

← 2004	4 May 2006	2007 →

17 of 51 seats to Derby City Council 26 seats needed for a majority
	First party	Second party	Third party
Party	Labour	Liberal Democrats	Conservative
Last election	24	14	11
Seats before	26	12	11
Seats won	7	7	3
Seats after	24	15	11
Seat change	▼2	▲3	▼1
Popular vote	20,512	17,867	19,143
Percentage	34.3%	29.9%	32.0%
Swing	▲2.1%	▲1.0%	▲4.2%
Council control before election
Labour
Council control after election
No overall control

The 2006 Derby City Council election took place on 4 May 2006 to elect members of Derby City Council in England. One third of the council was up for election and the Labour Party lost their majority on the council to no overall control.

The Labour Party had regained a majority of one on the council after a gain from the Liberal Democrats in a July 2005 by-election in Abbey ward. However they were expected to lose control of the council in the 2006 election. The campaign saw controversy over the Conservative candidate for Sinfin ward, Randeep Kaur Samra, who was under the legal age of 21 for standing in the election, leading to other political parties demanding an apology from the Conservatives.

The results saw the Liberal Democrats gain three seats from Labour to deprive them of their majority, although Labour gained one seat from the Conservatives. Overall turnout was 35.2% and talks followed the election to decide who would run the council. These resulted in an agreement between Labour and the Conservatives, which meant Labour would continue to form the administration but with the Conservatives taking 3 of the 10 seats in the cabinet.

After the election, the composition of the council was:

- Labour 24
- Liberal Democrat 15
- Conservative 11
- Independent 1

== Election result ==
2006 Derby local election result
Party	Seats	Gains	Losses	Net gain/loss	Seats %	Votes %	Votes	+/−
Labour	7	1	3	▼2	41.2	34.3	20,512	
Liberal Democrats	7	3	0	▲3	41.2	29.9	17,867	
Conservative	3	0	1	▼1	17.6	32.0	19,143	
Green	0	0	0	Steady	0.0	2.0	1,173	
Independent	0	0	0	Steady	0.0	1.7	1,041	

== Ward results ==
=== Abbey ===
Location of Abbey ward

Abbey
Party	Candidate	Votes	%	±%
Liberal Democrats	Deirdre Mitchell	1,365	45.8	+3.4
Labour	Samuel Greer	1,134	38.0	+9.3
Conservative	Robin Wood	299	10.0	−2.4
Green	Stephen Shelton	184	6.2	+6.2
Majority		231	7.8	−5.9
Turnout		2,982	26.7	−15.2
Liberal Democrats hold		Swing		

=== Allestree ===
Location of Allestree ward

Allestree
Party	Candidate	Votes	%	±%
Conservative	Roy Webb	3,228	65.2	+19.8
Labour	Margot Keats	962	19.4	−0.3
Liberal Democrats	Roger Jackson	763	15.4	−1.0
Majority		2,266	45.8	+20.1
Turnout		4,953	46.3	−14.1
Conservative hold		Swing		

=== Alvaston ===
Location of Alvaston ward

Alvaston
Party	Candidate	Votes	%	±%
Liberal Democrats	Julie Ginns	1,455	43.2	+28.1
Labour	Jonathan Bayliss	1,226	36.4	−3.7
Conservative	Simon Hart	486	14.4	−2.8
Green	Jean MacDonald	201	6.0	+6.0
Majority		229	6.8	
Turnout		3,368	31.9	−9.4
Liberal Democrats gain from Labour		Swing		

=== Arboretum ===
Location of Arboretum ward

Arboretum
Party	Candidate	Votes	%	±%
Liberal Democrats	Rehmet Kham	1,454	42.9	+3.2
Labour	Abdul Rehman	1,394	41.1	−4.5
Conservative	Mohammed Yaqub	540	15.9	+1.3
Majority		60	1.8	
Turnout		3,388	35.4	−14.0
Liberal Democrats gain from Labour		Swing		

=== Blagreaves ===
Location of Blagreaves ward

Blagreaves
Party	Candidate	Votes	%	±%
Liberal Democrats	Ruth Skelton	2,085	48.5	−6.6
Labour	Bhagat Shanker	1,283	29.9	+3.2
Conservative	David Greenway	724	16.8	−1.4
Green	Clare Shelton	206	4.8	+4.8
Majority		802	18.6	−9.8
Turnout		4,298	45.0	−7.2
Liberal Democrats hold		Swing		

=== Boulton ===
Location of Boulton ward

Boulton
Party	Candidate	Votes	%	±%
Labour	Ranjit Banwait	1,536	46.2	
Independent	Brenda Longworth	729	21.9	
Conservative	Adam Thomas	699	21.0	
Liberal Democrats	Grahame Elson	364	10.9	
Majority		807	24.3	
Turnout		3,328	33.6	−12.0
Labour hold		Swing		

=== Chaddesden ===
Location of Chaddesten ward

Chaddesden
Party	Candidate	Votes	%	±%
Labour	Sara Bolton	1,541	46.8	+3.6
Conservative	Alan Grimadell	1,273	38.7	+1.9
Liberal Democrats	David Batey	477	14.5	−1.1
Majority		268	8.1	+1.7
Turnout		3,291	33.8	−14.4
Labour hold		Swing		

=== Chellaston ===
Location of Chellaston ward

Chellaston
Party	Candidate	Votes	%	±%
Labour	Philip Ingall	1,717	45.6	+4.3
Conservative	Paul Willitts	1,709	45.4	+16.5
Liberal Democrats	John Banks	338	9.0	+0.3
Majority		8	0.2	−12.2
Turnout		3,764	37.3	−13.4
Labour gain from Conservative		Swing		

=== Darley ===
Location of Darley ward

Darley
Party	Candidate	Votes	%	±%
Liberal Democrats	Wendy Harbon	1,393	36.4	−2.3
Labour	Martin Repton	1,250	32.7	+1.5
Conservative	Andrew Hill	831	21.7	−8.5
Green	Jane Temple	348	9.1	+9.1
Majority		143	3.7	−3.8
Turnout		3,822	41.2	−7.2
Liberal Democrats gain from Labour		Swing		

=== Derwent ===
Location of Derwent ward

Derwent
Party	Candidate	Votes	%	±%
Labour	David Roberts	1,179	48.0	−1.4
Conservative	Franklyn Harwood	677	27.6	−3.6
Independent	William Wright	312	12.7	+12.7
Liberal Democrats	Christopher Goacher	288	11.7	−7.7
Majority		502	20.4	+2.2
Turnout		2,456	17.5	−24.1
Labour hold		Swing		

=== Littleover ===
Location of Littleover ward

Littleover
Party	Candidate	Votes	%	±%
Liberal Democrats	Lucy Care	2,603	61.3	+1.4
Conservative	Terry Boston	1,057	24.9	−0.3
Labour	Jogindar Johal	586	13.8	−1.1
Majority		1,546	36.4	+1.7
Turnout		4,246	43.8	−7.2
Liberal Democrats hold		Swing		

=== Mackworth ===
Location of Mackworth ward

Mackworth
Party	Candidate	Votes	%	±%
Labour	Raymond Baxter	1,331	49.8	+6.2
Conservative	Alexander Williams	737	27.6	+3.9
Liberal Democrats	Lorraine Brown	606	22.7	−9.9
Majority		594	22.2	+11.2
Turnout		2,674	29.4	−12.9
Labour hold		Swing		

=== Mickleover ===
Location of Mickleover ward

Mickleover
Party	Candidate	Votes	%	±%
Liberal Democrats	Marilyn Winter	2,421	47.9	−11.0
Conservative	Matthew Holmes	2,022	40.0	+11.8
Labour	Clair Hinson	613	12.1	−0.8
Majority		399	7.9	−22.8
Turnout		5,056	45.9	−10.9
Liberal Democrats hold		Swing		

=== Normanton ===
Location of Normanton ward

Normanton
Party	Candidate	Votes	%	±%
Labour	Chris Williamson	1,657	53.5	+20.6
Liberal Democrats	Harjinder Naitta	839	27.1	+8.1
Conservative	Masadiq Hussain	601	19.4	+10.4
Majority		818	26.4	+12.5
Turnout		3,097	31.6	−21.4
Labour hold		Swing		

=== Oakwood ===
Location of Oakwood ward

Oakwood
Party	Candidate	Votes	%	±%
Conservative	Pauline Latham	1,753	56.8	+7.1
Labour	Phillip Woodhead	780	25.3	−7.4
Liberal Democrats	Eric Asburner	317	10.3	−7.2
Green	Henrik Skov	234	7.6	+7.6
Majority		973	31.5	+14.5
Turnout		3,084	31.0	−16.2
Conservative hold		Swing		

=== Sinfin ===
Location of Sinfin ward

Sinfin
Party	Candidate	Votes	%	±%
Labour	Robin Turner	1,295	58.7	+13.6
Liberal Democrats	Leigh Alcock	549	24.9	−5.7
Conservative	Randeep Samra	362	16.4	−7.9
Majority		746	33.8	+19.3
Turnout		2,206	24.6	−12.8
Labour hold		Swing		

=== Spondon ===
Location of Spondon ward

Spondon
Party	Candidate	Votes	%	±%
Conservative	Christopher Poulter	2,145	57.6	+4.6
Labour	Richard Morgan	1,028	27.6	+2.3
Liberal Democrats	Patrick Peat	550	14.8	−6.9
Majority		1,117	30.0	+2.3
Turnout		3,723	39.9	−12.4
Conservative hold		Swing		
