= 2022 Derby City Council election =

2022 UK local government election

← 2021	5 May 2022	2023 →

17 out of 51 seats to Derby City Council 26 seats needed for a majority

	First party	Second party	Third party
Party	Conservative	Labour	Liberal Democrats
Last election	21 seats, 38.5%	14 seats, 31.0%	8 seats, 15.4%
Seats won	5	7	2
Seats after	18	16	8
Seat change	▼3	▲2	Steady
Popular vote	18,280	20,419	9,530
Percentage	32.4%	36.1%	16.9%
Swing	▼6.1%	▲5.1%	▲1.5%
	Fourth party	Fifth party
Party	Reform UK	Independent
Last election	6 seats, 7.2%	2 seats, 3.4%
Seats won	2	1
Seats after	6	3
Seat change	Steady	▲1
Popular vote	4,492	1,539
Percentage	8.0%	2.7%
Swing	▲0.8%	▼0.7%
- Winner of each seat at the 2022 Derby City Council election
Council control before election
No overall control
Council control after election
No overall control

The 2022 Derby City Council election took place on 5 May 2022 to elect members of Derby City Council in England. This was on the same day as other local elections. One-third of the seats were up for election.

== Results summary ==
2022 Derby City Council election
Party	This election			Full council			This election		
Party	Seats	Net	Seats %	Other	Total	Total %	Votes	Votes %	+/−
Conservative	5	▼3	29.4	13	18	35.3	18,280	32.4	-6.1
Labour	7	▲2	41.2	9	16	31.4	20,419	36.1	+5.1
Liberal Democrats	2	Steady	11.8	6	8	15.7	9,530	16.9	+1.5
Reform UK	2	Steady	11.8	4	6	11.8	4,492	8.0	+0.8
Independent	1	▲1	5.9	2	3	5.9	1,539	2.7	-0.7
Green	0	Steady	0.0	0	0	0.0	2,169	3.8	-0.6
English Democrat	0	Steady	0.0	0	0	0.0	56	0.1	N/A

== Ward results ==
=== Abbey ===
Abbey
Party	Candidate	Votes	%	±%
Labour Co-op	Paul Hezelgrave	1,384	47.3	+9.0
Liberal Democrats	Farhatullah Khan	924	31.6	−2.6
Conservative	Adam Hurt	355	12.1	−6.1
Green	Helen Hitchcock	161	5.5	−0.9
Reform UK	Julie Paxton	103	3.5	+0.6
Majority		460	15.7	
Turnout		2,927	30.6	
Labour Co-op hold		Swing	▲5.8	

=== Allestree ===
Allestree
Party	Candidate	Votes	%	±%
Conservative	Roy Webb	2,629	55.3	−11.8
Labour	Patrick Green	1,226	25.8	+6.5
Green	Tony Mott	413	8.7	+1.7
Liberal Democrats	Andrew Bird	344	7.2	+2.4
Reform UK	David Adams	139	2.9	+1.0
Majority		1,403	29.5	
Turnout		4,751	43.9	
Conservative hold		Swing	▼9.2	

=== Alvaston ===
Alvaston
Party	Candidate	Votes	%	±%
Reform UK	Alan Graves	1,692	54.9	+11.0
Labour Co-op	Tom Spray	979	31.7	−0.2
Conservative	Peter Berry	292	9.5	−11.2
Liberal Democrats	David Edwards	121	3.9	+0.4
Majority		713	23.2	
Turnout		3,084	27.0	
Reform UK gain from UKIP		Swing	▲5.6	

=== Arboretum ===
Arboretum
Party	Candidate	Votes	%	±%
Labour	Shiraz Khan	1,981	76.6	+9.1
Conservative	Edward Harrison	269	10.4	−1.9
Liberal Democrats	Jairo Marrero	209	8.1	+0.1
Reform UK	Stephen Handley	128	4.9	+0.1
Majority		1,712	66.2	
Turnout		2,587	22.2	
Labour hold		Swing	▲5.5	

=== Blagreaves ===
Blagreaves
Party	Candidate	Votes	%	±%
Liberal Democrats	Ruth Skelton	1,877	50.2	+0.8
Labour	Saquib Amin	1,382	37.0	+9.0
Conservative	David Jennings	378	10.1	−9.6
Reform UK	James Wise	103	2.8	−0.1
Majority		495	13.2	
Turnout		3,740	38.7	
Liberal Democrats hold		Swing	▼4.1	

=== Boulton ===
Boulton
Party	Candidate	Votes	%	±%
Reform UK	Alan Lindsey	1,176	41.0	−16.3
Labour	Iain Parker	1,109	38.7	+4.3
Conservative	Chris Howlett	481	16.8	N/A
Liberal Democrats	Jane Webb	99	3.5	−4.8
Majority		67	2.3	
Turnout		2,865	28.6	
Reform UK gain from UKIP		Swing	▼10.3	

=== Chaddesden ===
Chaddesden
Party	Candidate	Votes	%	±%
Conservative	Rob Cooper	1,971	65.7	−3.4
Labour Co-op	John Banks	743	24.8	±0.0
Green	Stevie Hardy	113	3.8	N/A
Reform UK	Alfred Saxby	89	3.0	−0.4
Liberal Democrats	Glenda Howcroft	86	2.9	+0.3
Majority		1,228	40.9	
Turnout		3,002	30.4	
Conservative hold		Swing	▼1.7	

=== Chellaston ===
Chellaston
Party	Candidate	Votes	%	±%
Independent	Celia Ingall	1,539	39.9	+3.9
Conservative	Ross McCristal	1,284	33.3	−9.5
Labour	Viv Pointon	711	18.4	+4.0
Green	Daniel Thompson	117	3.0	N/A
Liberal Democrats	Paul Wilson	104	2.7	−2.4
Reform UK	George Warren	100	2.6	+0.9
Majority		255	6.6	
Turnout		3,855	32.7	
Independent gain from Conservative		Swing	▲6.7	

=== Darley ===
Darley
Party	Candidate	Votes	%	±%
Labour Co-op	Carmel Swan	2,040	53.5	+10.3
Conservative	Alan Grimadell	1,078	28.3	−2.5
Green	Jane Temple	380	10.0	−7.0
Liberal Democrats	Gregory Webb	209	5.5	−1.1
Reform UK	Lucy Murphy	104	2.7	+0.2
Majority		962	25.2	
Turnout		3,811	36.9	
Labour Co-op hold		Swing	▲6.4	

Although Darley was a Labour hold from the 2018 Derby City Council election it was a Labour gain from 2021 when it was won by the Conservatives at a by-election held concurrently with the main 2021 Derby City Council election.

=== Derwent ===
Derwent
Party	Candidate	Votes	%	±%
Labour Co-op	Martin Rawson	867	38.6	+10.6
Liberal Democrats	Richard Hudson	693	30.8	+28.3
Conservative	Gaynor Collick	626	27.8	−9.2
Reform UK	Amanda Gouy de Muyncke	62	2.8	+0.2
Majority		174	7.8	
Turnout		2,248	22.3	
Labour Co-op gain from Conservative		Swing	▼8.9	

=== Littleover ===
Littleover
Party	Candidate	Votes	%	±%
Liberal Democrats	Lucy Care	2,247	51.3	+8.1
Labour Co-op	Philip Hutchinson	1,302	29.7	+0.3
Conservative	Ed Packham	661	15.1	−9.9
Green	Jak Carr	114	2.6	N/A
Reform UK	Carole Bradley	55	1.3	−0.2
Majority		945	21.6	
Turnout		4,379	39.3	
Liberal Democrats hold		Swing	▲3.9	

=== Mackworth ===
Mackworth
Party	Candidate	Votes	%	±%
Labour	John Whitby	1,160	43.8	+5.9
Conservative	Adrian Pegg	983	37.1	−7.8
Green	Sam Ward	303	11.4	+2.0
Liberal Democrats	Carmine Branco	107	4.0	−0.4
Reform UK	Nigel Caulton	97	3.7	+0.3
Majority		177	6.7	
Turnout		2,650	26.3	
Labour gain from Conservative		Swing	▲6.9	

=== Mickleover ===
Mickleover
Party	Candidate	Votes	%	±%
Conservative	Alison Holmes	2,489	50.3	−8.6
Liberal Democrats	Nick Northover	1,558	31.5	+4.2
Labour	Jonathan Bayliss	640	12.9	+0.7
Green	Holly Rushbrooke	176	3.6	N/A
Reform UK	Steve Peach	85	1.7	+0.2
Majority		931	18.8	
Turnout		4,948	41.9	
Conservative hold		Swing	▼6.4	

=== Normanton ===
Normanton
Party	Candidate	Votes	%	±%
Labour Co-op	Balbir Sandhu	2,067	74.0	+17.5
Conservative	Jamie Mulhall	510	18.3	+7.0
Reform UK	Anthony Blaney	135	4.8	−2.5
Liberal Democrats	Abdul Jabbar	82	2.9	−21.9
Majority		1,557	55.7	
Turnout		2,794	26.9	
Labour Co-op hold		Swing	▲5.3	

=== Oakwood ===
Oakwood
Party	Candidate	Votes	%	±%
Conservative	Mick Barker	1,668	53.7	−10.0
Labour Co-op	Neil Wilson	788	25.3	+12.6
Liberal Democrats	Frank Harwood	448	14.4	−4.2
Green	Molly Christodoulou	123	4.0	+0.4
Reform UK	Helen Caulton	82	2.6	+1.2
Majority		880	28.4	
Turnout		3,109	30.4	
Conservative hold		Swing	▼11.3	

=== Sinfin ===
Sinfin
Party	Candidate	Votes	%	±%
Labour Co-op	Nadine Peatfield	1,439	58.7	−0.7
Conservative	Jay Joshi	733	29.9	−0.7
Liberal Democrats	Paul Lind	126	5.1	+0.3
Reform UK	Brenden May	96	3.9	−1.2
English Democrat	David Black	56	2.3	N/A
Majority		706	28.8	
Turnout		2,450	23.5	
Labour Co-op hold		Swing	N/A	

=== Spondon ===
Spondon
Party	Candidate	Votes	%	±%
Conservative	Christopher Poulter	1,873	57.0	−13.0
Labour	Ashiq Hussain	601	18.3	+4.9
Liberal Democrats	Philip Wray	296	9.0	+4.6
Green	Victor Wood	269	8.2	−1.7
Reform UK	Stephen Fowke	248	7.5	+5.2
Majority		1,272	38.7	
Turnout		3,287	33.6	
Conservative hold		Swing	▼9.0	
