= 2021 Derby City Council election =

2021 UK local government election

Map showing the results of the 2021 Derby City Council election

The 2021 Derby City Council election took place on 6 May 2021 to elect members of Derby City Council in England. This was on the same day as other local elections. One-third of the seats were up for election, with one ward (Darley) electing two councillors.

== Results ==
2021 Derby City Council election
Party	This election				Full council			This election		
Party	Candidates	Seats	Net	Seats %	Other	Total	Total %	Votes	Votes %	+/−
Conservative	{{{candidates}}}	9	▲2	50.0	12	21	41.2	24,665	38.5	+6.9
Labour	{{{candidates}}}	5	▼3	27.8	8	13	25.5	19,807	31.0	+0.6
Liberal Democrats	{{{candidates}}}	2	Steady	11.1	6	8	15.7	9,880	15.4	-2.5
Independent	{{{candidates}}}	0	Steady	0.0	7	7	13.7	2,154	3.4	-0.9
Reform	{{{candidates}}}	2	▲2	11.1	0	2	3.9	4,615	7.2	New
Green	{{{candidates}}}	0	Steady	0.0	0	0	0.0	2,799	4.4	+4.1
Link Party	{{{candidates}}}	0	Steady	0.0	0	0	0.0	41	0.1	±0.0
TUSC	{{{candidates}}}	0	Steady	0.0	0	0	0.0	29	<0.1	New
UKIP	{{{candidates}}}	0	▼1	0.0	0	0	0.0	N/A	N/A	-15.4

== Ward results ==
=== Abbey ===
Abbey
Party	Candidate	Votes	%	±%
Labour	Sue Bonser	1,147	38.3	+1.6
Liberal Democrats	Farhatullah Khan	1,025	34.2	−8.7
Conservative	Edward Rycroft	546	18.2	+9.5
Green	Helen Hitchcock	192	6.4	N/A
Reform	Julie Paxton (Note: Stood as Reform Derby and Reform UK)	87	2.9	N/A
Majority		122	4.1	
Turnout		2,997	30.8	
Labour hold		Swing		

=== Allestree ===
Allestree
Party	Candidate	Votes	%	±%
Conservative	Ged Potter	3,489	67.1	+4.7
Labour Co-op	John Banks	1,002	19.3	+3.0
Green	Tony Mott	363	7.0	N/A
Liberal Democrats	Martin Jones	250	4.8	−7.2
Reform	James Wise	99	1.9	N/A
Majority		2,487	47.8	
Turnout		5,203	47.7	
Conservative hold		Swing		

=== Alvaston ===
Alvaston
Party	Candidate	Votes	%	±%
Reform	John Evans	1,411	43.9	N/A
Labour Co-op	Thomas Spray	1,024	31.9	+5.4
Conservative	Peter Berry	665	20.7	+9.2
Liberal Democrats	Preetinder Butter	113	3.5	−2.1
Majority		387	12.0	
Turnout		3,213	27.7	
Reform gain from UKIP		Swing		

John Evans was the sitting councillor having been elected as a UKIP candidate in 2016.

=== Arboretum ===
Arboretum
Party	Candidate	Votes	%	±%
Labour	Gulfraz Nawaz	1,952	67.5	−4.8
Conservative	Adam Hurt	355	12.3	+2.0
Liberal Democrats	Jairo Marrero	232	8.0	−2.4
Green	Ian Sleeman	214	7.4	N/A
Reform	George Flint	140	4.8	N/A
Majority		1,597	55.2	
Turnout		2,893	24.6	
Labour hold		Swing		

=== Blagreaves ===
Blagreaves
Party	Candidate	Votes	%	±%
Liberal Democrats	Joe Naitta	1,895	49.4	−0.2
Labour	Michael Bullock	1,073	28.0	−4.0
Conservative	Rusi Jaspal	755	19.7	+9.0
Reform	Anthony Blaney	111	2.9	N/A
Majority		822	21.4	
Turnout		3,834	39.6	
Liberal Democrats hold		Swing		

=== Boulton ===
Boulton
Party	Candidate	Votes	%	±%
Reform	Tim Prosser	1,663	57.3	N/A
Labour	Sara Bolton	998	34.4	+12.9
Liberal Democrats	Jane Webb	240	8.3	+3.5
Majority		665	22.9	
Turnout		2,901	28.7	
Reform gain from Labour		Swing		

=== Chaddesden ===
Chaddesden
Party	Candidate	Votes	%	±%
Conservative	Jonathan Smale	2,311	69.1	+10.8
Labour	Adam Wisdish	829	24.8	+2.2
Reform	Gary Small	115	3.4	N/A
Liberal Democrats	Glenda Howcroft	88	2.6	−2.0
Majority		1,482	44.3	
Turnout		3,343	33.8	
Conservative hold		Swing		

=== Chellaston ===
Chellaston
Party	Candidate	Votes	%	±%
Conservative	Harvey Jennings	1,743	42.8	+7.3
Independent	Celia Ingall	1,463	36.0	−3.3
Labour	Hafeez Rehman	584	14.4	+2.6
Liberal Democrats	Paul Wilson	209	5.1	−1.2
Reform	Alfred Saxby	70	1.7	N/A
Majority		280	6.8	
Turnout		4,069	34.6	
Conservative hold		Swing		

=== Darley ===
Darley
Party	Candidate	Votes	%	±%
Labour Co-op	Alison Martin	1,833	49.3	+1.0
Conservative	Alan Grimadell	1,305	35.1	+10.1
Labour Co-op	Carmel Swan	1,304	35.1	−13.2
Conservative	Chris Howlett	1,138	30.6	+5.6
Green	Adrian Howlett	721	19.4	N/A
Green	Robert Jacques	564	15.2	N/A
Liberal Democrats	Simon King	278	7.5	−10.1
Liberal Democrats	Eloise Thatcher	186	5.0	−12.6
Reform	John Summerfield	105	2.8	N/A
Turnout		—	37.6	
Labour Co-op hold				
Conservative gain from Labour Co-op				

=== Derwent ===
Derwent
Party	Candidate	Votes	%	±%
Conservative	Tracey Pearce	892	37.0	−10.4
Independent	Richard Hudson*	691	28.7	N/A
Labour	Martin Rawson	674	28.0	−0.7
Reform	Carole Bradley	62	2.6	N/A
Liberal Democrats	Simon Ferrigno	60	2.5	−3.8
TUSC	Eden Maskill-Watts	29	1.2	N/A
Majority		201	8.3	
Turnout		2,408	23.9	
Conservative hold		Swing		

Incumbent Richard Hudson had been elected as a Conservative, but was suspended from, and later quit the party in March 2021.

=== Littleover ===
Littleover
Party	Candidate	Votes	%	±%
Liberal Democrats	Emily Lonsdale	1,976	43.2	−6.5
Labour	Gurdev Dhillon	1,343	29.4	+5.7
Conservative	Ed Packham	1,140	25.0	+6.7
Reform	Brenden May	69	1.5	N/A
Link Party	Tony Welch	41	0.9	−0.6
Majority		633	13.8	
Turnout		4,569	41.2	
Liberal Democrats hold		Swing		

=== Mackworth ===
Mackworth
Party	Candidate	Votes	%	±%
Conservative	Gaurav Pandey	1,227	44.9	+10.6
Labour	Paul Pegg *	1,034	37.9	−0.8
Green	Samuel Ward	256	9.4	N/A
Liberal Democrats	Carmine Branco	121	4.4	−3.9
Reform	George Warren	92	3.4	N/A
Majority		193	7.0	
Turnout		2,730	26.8	
Conservative gain from Labour		Swing		

=== Mickleover ===
Mickleover
Party	Candidate	Votes	%	±%
Conservative	Matthew Holmes	3,071	58.9	+14.2
Liberal Democrats	Maggie Hird	1,426	27.3	−9.8
Labour	John Whitby	637	12.2	+1.6
Reform	Derek Reynolds	80	1.5	−6.1
Majority		1,645	31.6	
Turnout		5,214	45.4	
Conservative hold		Swing		

=== Normanton ===
Normanton
Party	Candidate	Votes	%	±%
Labour Co-op	Hardyal Dhindsa	1,878	56.5	−18.9
Liberal Democrats	Abdul Jabbar	825	24.8	+17.7
Conservative	Tafseer Habib	377	11.3	+2.4
Reform	Michael Siveyer	242	7.3	N/A
Majority		1,053	31.7	
Turnout		3,322	32.1	
Labour Co-op hold		Swing		

=== Oakwood ===
Oakwood
Party	Candidate	Votes	%	±%
Conservative	Matthew Eyre	2,304	63.7	+17.7
Liberal Democrats	Frank Harwood*	671	18.6	+12.7
Labour Co-op	Neil Wilson	460	12.7	−2.8
Green	Vic Wood	130	3.6	N/A
Reform	Graham Leeming	51	1.4	N/A
Majority		1,633	45.1	
Turnout		3,616	35.2	
Conservative hold		Swing		

Frank Harwood had been elected as a Conservative, but resigned the party whip and sat as an independent from June 2020. He subsequently joined the Liberal Democrats just before the election.

Victorious candidate Matthew Eyre was just 23 years old, and became the youngest councillor in Derbyshire at the time, a position he held until the 2022 Long Eaton By-election for Derbyshire County Council.

=== Sinfin ===
Sinfin
Party	Candidate	Votes	%	±%
Labour	Baggy Shanker	1,551	59.4	+8.7
Conservative	Jay Joshi	798	30.6	+7.9
Reform	Doug Lumley	134	5.1	−15.1
Liberal Democrats	Paul Lind	126	4.8	−1.7
Majority		753	28.8	
Turnout		2,609	25.1	
Labour hold		Swing		

=== Spondon ===
Spondon
Party	Candidate	Votes	%	±%
Conservative	Evonne Williams	2,539	70.0	+10.8
Labour	Ashiq Hussain	484	13.4	−5.3
Green	Andreas Christodoulou	359	9.9	+4.4
Liberal Democrats	Philip Wray	159	4.4	+1.3
Reform	David Adams	84	2.3	−11.2
Majority		2,055	56.6	
Turnout		3,625	36.7	
Conservative hold		Swing		
