= Derby South =

Parliamentary constituency in the United Kingdom, 1950 onwards

Coordinates: 52.90°N 1.45°W

- Borough constituency for the House of Commons
- Interactive map of boundaries since 2010
- Location within the East Midlands
- County: Derbyshire
- Electorate: 72,067 (March 2020)
- Major settlements: Derby

Current constituency
- Created: 1950
- Member of Parliament: Baggy Shanker (Labour Co-op)
- Seats: One
- Created from: Derby

Derby South (/ˈdɑːrbi/) is a constituency (Note: A borough constituency (for the purposes of election expenses and type of returning officer)) formed of part of the city of Derby, most recently represented in the House of Commons of the UK Parliament since 2024 by Baggy Shanker of the Labour and Co-op Party. The previous MP, Margaret Beckett, served the constituency for 41 years (from 1983 to 2024). She served under the Labour governments of Harold Wilson, James Callaghan, Tony Blair and Gordon Brown. She became interim Leader of the Labour Party in 1994 when John Smith suddenly died. She also served in the Opposition front bench under Neil Kinnock and Smith. (Note: As with all constituencies, the constituency elects one Member of Parliament (MP) by the first-past-the-post system of election at least every five years.)

== Constituency profile ==
Derby South is an entirely urban and suburban constituency located in Derbyshire. It covers the city centre of Derby and the neighbourhoods to its south, including Normanton, Sinfin, Osmaston, Chellaston and Alvaston. Derby is a centre for engineering, particularly in rail transport. The city has a large deaf community, second only to London. High levels of deprivation are present in the constituency; Chellaston and parts of Normanton are generally wealthy but much of the constituency falls within the 10% most-deprived areas in England.

Compared to national averages, residents of Derby South are younger, have low levels of income and education, and are less likely to work in professional occupations. At the 2021 census, White people made up 62% of the population and Asians (primarily Pakistanis) were the largest ethnic minority group at 24%. At the city council, the wards in the city centre, Normanton and Sinfin are represented by the Labour Party. Osmaston and Alvaston elected Reform councillors whilst Chellaston elected independents. Most voters in Derby South supported leaving the European Union in the 2016 referendum, with an estimated 62% voting in favour of Brexit compared to 52% nationwide.

== Boundaries ==
Derby city centre has been in this constituency since 1974; from 1950 it had been in Derby North.

=== Historic ===
1950–1955: The County Borough of Derby wards of Alvaston, Arboretum, Castle, Dale, Litchurch, Normanton, Osmaston, and Peartree.

1955–1974: The County Borough of Derby wards of Alvaston, Arboretum, Castle, Dale, Litchurch, Normanton, Osmaston, and Peartree, and the parish of Littleover in the Rural District of Shardlow.

1974–1977: The Borough of Derby wards of Alvaston, Arboretum, Babington, Chellaston, Litchurch, Littleover, Normanton, Osmaston, and Peartree.

1977–1983: The City of Derby wards of Alvaston, Arboretum, Babington, Chellaston, Litchurch, Littleover, Normanton, Osmaston, and Peartree.

1983–1997: The City of Derby wards of Alvaston, Babington, Blagreaves, Kingsway, Litchurch, Littleover, Normanton, Osmaston, and Sinfin.

Boundaries of Derby South from 1997 to 2010

1997–2010: The City of Derby wards of Alvaston, Babington, Blagreaves, Kingsway, Litchurch, Littleover, Mickleover, Normanton, Osmaston, and Sinfin.

2010–2023: The City of Derby wards of Alvaston, Arboretum, Blagreaves, Boulton, Chellaston, Normanton, and Sinfin.

=== Current ===
Following a local government boundary review which came into effect in May 2023, the constituency now comprises the following wards of the City of Derby:

- Abbey (small part); Alvaston North; Alvaston South; Arboretum (nearly all); Blagreaves; Chellaston & Shelton Lock; Darley (small part); Normanton (most); Sinfin & Osmaston.

The 2023 review of Westminster constituencies, which was based on the ward structure in place at 1 December 2020, left the boundaries unchanged.

== History ==
The constituency was created in 1950, when the former two-seat constituency of Derby was split into two single-member seats. Unlike Derby North, this seat has been held by the Labour Party continuously since its creation.

A notable former MP for the seat was its first incumbent, Philip Noel-Baker of the Labour Party. He served as a Cabinet minister in the post-war Attlee government, and was awarded the Nobel Peace Prize in 1959 for his campaigning for disarmament. He had previously represented the former two-seat constituency of Derby since a by-election in 1936.

The former Cabinet minister Margaret Beckett, who had represented Lincoln (under her maiden name of Margaret Jackson) from 1974 to 1979, represented Derby South for the Labour Party from 1983 until 2024. In 1983, Beckett won the seat with one of the smallest majorities seen of just 421 over the Conservative Party–she always achieved larger majorities since. The 2019 result, in line with other seats that voted for Brexit, saw a drop in votes for Labour, with both the Conservative and Liberal Democrat candidates making gains. Beckett still won a majority of all votes cast, however, representing a higher vote share than in the elections between 2005 and 2015, making Derby South a safe seat for the Labour Party.

== Members of Parliament ==
Derby prior to 1950

Election	Member	Party
1950	Philip Noel-Baker	Labour
1970	Walter Johnson	Labour
1983	Margaret Beckett	Labour
2024	Baggy Shanker	Labour Co-op

== Elections ==
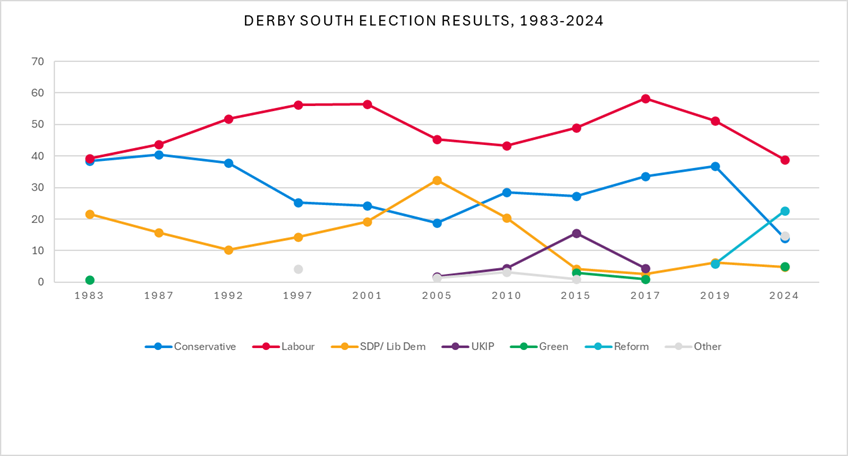
Derby south election results 1983–2024

=== Elections in the 2020s ===
General election 2024: Derby South
Party	Candidate	Votes	%	±%
Labour Co-op	Baggy Shanker	14,503	38.8	−12.3
Reform	Alan Graves	8,501	22.7	+16.9
Workers Party	Chris Williamson	5,205	13.9	N/A
Conservative	Jamie Mulhall	5,192	13.9	−23.0
Green	Sam Ward	1,899	5.1	N/A
Liberal Democrats	Joe Naitta	1,807	4.8	−1.4
Independent	Zephyr Tair	292	0.8	N/A
Majority		6,002	16.1	+0.9
Turnout		37,399	51.3	−7.6
Registered electors		72,952		
Labour Co-op hold		Swing	−14.6	

=== Elections in the 2010s ===
General election 2019: Derby South
Party	Candidate	Votes	%	±%
Labour	Margaret Beckett	21,690	51.1	−7.2
Conservative	Ed Barker	15,671	36.9	+3.4
Liberal Democrats	Joe Naitta	2,621	6.2	+3.5
Brexit Party	Timothy Prosser	2,480	5.8	New
Majority		6,019	14.2	−10.6
Turnout		42,462	58.1	−6.7
Labour hold		Swing	-5.3	

General election 2017: Derby South
Party	Candidate	Votes	%	±%
Labour	Margaret Beckett	26,430	58.3	+9.3
Conservative	Evonne Williams	15,182	33.5	+6.1
UKIP	Alan Graves	2,011	4.4	−11.1
Liberal Democrats	Joe Naitta	1,229	2.7	−1.5
Green	Ian Sleeman	454	1.0	−2.0
Majority		11,248	24.8	+3.2
Turnout		45,306	64.8	+6.7
Labour hold		Swing	+1.6	

General election 2015: Derby South
Party	Candidate	Votes	%	±%
Labour	Margaret Beckett	20,007	49.0	+5.7
Conservative	Evonne Williams	11,179	27.4	−1.1
UKIP	Victor Webb	6,341	15.5	+11.1
Liberal Democrats	Joe Naitta	1,717	4.2	−16.3
Green	David Foster	1,208	3.0	New
TUSC	Chris Fernandez	225	0.6	+0.6
British Independents	David Gale	143	0.4	+0.4
Majority		8,828	21.6	+6.8
Turnout		40,820	58.1	+0.1
Labour hold		Swing	+3.4	

General election 2010: Derby South
Party	Candidate	Votes	%	±%
Labour	Margaret Beckett	17,851	43.3	−9.8
Conservative	Jack Perscke	11,729	28.5	+8.7
Liberal Democrats	David Batey	8,430	20.5	−3.7
UKIP	Stephen Fowke	1,821	4.4	+3.0
Independent	Alan Graves	1,357	3.3	
Majority		6,122	14.8	
Turnout		41,188	58.0	−6.7
Labour hold		Swing	-9.25	

The vote share changes on 2005 and the turnout figures were notional based on boundary changes.

=== Elections in the 2000s ===
General election 2005: Derby South
Party	Candidate	Votes	%	±%
Labour	Margaret Beckett	19,683	45.4	−11.0
Liberal Democrats	Lucy Care	14,026	32.3	+13.0
Conservative	David Brackenbury	8,211	18.9	−5.4
UKIP	David Black	845	1.9	New
Veritas	Frank Leeming	608	1.4	New
Majority		5,657	13.0	−19.1
Turnout		43,373	61.6	+5.7
Labour hold		Swing	-12.0	

General election 2001: Derby South
Party	Candidate	Votes	%	±%
Labour	Margaret Beckett	24,310	56.4	+0.1
Conservative	Simon Spencer	10,455	24.3	−0.9
Liberal Democrats	Anders Hanson	8,310	19.3	+4.9
Majority		13,855	32.1	+1.0
Turnout		43,075	55.9	−12.1
Labour hold		Swing		

=== Elections in the 1990s ===
General election 1997: Derby South
Party	Candidate	Votes	%	±%
Labour	Margaret Beckett	29,154	56.3	+4.6
Conservative	Javed Arain	13,048	25.2	−12.7
Liberal Democrats	Jeremy Beckett	7,438	14.4	+4.0
Referendum	John K. Browne	1,862	3.6	New
National Democrats	Rob Evans	317	0.6	New
Majority		16,106	31.1	+17.3
Turnout		51,819	67.8	−7.7
Labour hold		Swing		

General election 1992: Derby South
Party	Candidate	Votes	%	±%
Labour	Margaret Beckett	25,917	51.7	+8.0
Conservative	Nicholas P. Brown	18,981	37.9	−2.6
Liberal Democrats	Simon J. Hartropp	5,198	10.4	−5.4
Majority		6,936	13.8	+10.6
Turnout		50,096	75.5	+5.6
Labour hold		Swing	+5.2	

=== Elections in the 1980s ===
General election 1987: Derby South
Party	Candidate	Votes	%	±%
Labour	Margaret Beckett	21,003	43.7	+4.4
Conservative	Paul Leighton	19,487	40.5	+2.1
SDP	Nora Mellor	7,608	15.8	−5.8
Majority		1,516	3.2	+2.3
Turnout		48,098	69.9	+2.5
Labour hold		Swing		

General election 1983: Derby South
Party	Candidate	Votes	%	±%
Labour	Margaret Beckett	18,169	39.3	−10.7
Conservative	Gerald Hales	17,748	38.4	−0.3
SDP	Ivor Smith	9,976	21.6	+11.9
Ecology	Eric Wall	297	0.7	New
Majority		421	0.9	−10.4
Turnout		46,190	67.4	−4.0
Labour hold		Swing		

=== Elections in the 1970s ===
General election 1979: Derby South
Party	Candidate	Votes	%	±%
Labour	Walter Johnson	26,945	50.0	−1.0
Conservative	Michael Stern	20,853	38.7	+5.8
Liberal	J.D. Somerset Sullivan	5,196	9.7	−4.9
National Front	L.A. Verity	587	1.1	New
Workers Revolutionary	W.A. Biggs	146	0.3	New
United English National	J. Short	122	0.2	−1.3
Majority		6,092	11.3	−6.8
Turnout		53,849	71.4	+1.9
Labour hold		Swing		

General election October 1974: Derby South
Party	Candidate	Votes	%	±%
Labour	Walter Johnson	26,342	51.0	+3.6
Conservative	A.J. Bussell	17,010	32.9	−1.7
Liberal	R. Palmer	7,520	14.6	−3.4
United English National	A.S. Ashby	793	1.5	New
Majority		9,332	18.1	+5.3
Turnout		51,665	69.5	+6.7
Labour hold		Swing		

General election February 1974: Derby South
Party	Candidate	Votes	%	±%
Labour	Walter Johnson	26,613	47.4	−7.0
Conservative	R.S.W. Clements	19,470	34.6	−11.0
Liberal	J. Mills	10,121	18.0	New
Majority		7,143	12.8	+4.0
Turnout		56,204	76.2	+8.9
Labour hold		Swing		

General election 1970: Derby South
Party	Candidate	Votes	%	±%
Labour	Walter Johnson	19,407	54.4	−3.2
Conservative	Royden Greene	16,258	45.6	+13.8
Majority		3,149	8.8	−17.0
Turnout		35,665	67.3	−5.3
Labour hold		Swing		

=== Elections in the 1960s ===
General election 1966: Derby South
Party	Candidate	Votes	%	±%
Labour	Philip Noel-Baker	21,433	57.6	−0.1
Conservative	Michael CG Fidler	11,857	31.8	−10.5
Liberal	A Leslie Smart	3,966	10.7	New
Majority		9,576	25.8	+10.4
Turnout		37,256	72.6	−5.2
Labour hold		Swing		

General election 1964: Derby South
Party	Candidate	Votes	%	±%
Labour	Philip Noel-Baker	22,432	57.7	+9.2
Conservative	T.M. Wray	16,420	42.3	+1.8
Majority		6,012	15.4	+7.4
Turnout		38,852	74.8	−4.4
Labour hold		Swing		

=== Elections in the 1950s ===
General election 1959: Derby South
Party	Candidate	Votes	%	±%
Labour	Philip Noel-Baker	20,776	48.5	−5.1
Conservative	T.M. Wray	17,345	40.5	+2.0
Liberal	A. Leslie Smart	4,746	11.1	+3.2
Majority		3,431	8.0	−7.1
Turnout		42,867	79.2	+0.4
Labour hold		Swing		

General election 1955: Derby South
Party	Candidate	Votes	%	±%
Labour	Philip Noel-Baker	23,081	53.6	−9.0
Conservative	Marcus Kimball	16,572	38.5	+1.1
Liberal	A. Leslie Smart	3,408	7.9	New
Majority		6,509	15.1	−10.1
Turnout		43,061	78.8	−5.7
Labour hold		Swing		

General election 1951: Derby South
Party	Candidate	Votes	%	±%
Labour	Philip Noel-Baker	27,333	62.6	+2.5
Conservative	Richard Cecil Dudley Grimes	16,344	37.4	+6.2
Majority		10,989	25.2	−3.7
Turnout		43,677	84.5	−1.6
Labour hold		Swing		

General election 1950: Derby South
Party	Candidate	Votes	%	±%
Labour	Philip Noel-Baker	26,886	60.1	
Conservative	Richard Cecil Dudley Grimes	13,926	31.2	
Liberal	Lyndon Irving	3,900	8.7	
Majority		12,960	28.9	
Turnout		44,712	87.1	
Labour win (new seat)				

== See also ==
- parliamentary constituencies in Derbyshire

== Notes ==
Parliament of the United Kingdom
Preceded by Monklands East	Constituency represented by the leader of the opposition 1994	Succeeded by Sedgefield
