= Allestree Woodlands School =

Allestree Woodlands School (AWS)

Location
- Blenheim Drive; Derby, Derbyshire, DE22 2LW; England; 52°57′15″N 1°30′01″W

Information
- Type: Converter academy
- Motto: Aspire and achieve
- Established: 1956
- Founder: Bob Woodland
- Department for Education URN: 137911 Tables
- Ofsted: Reports
- Headteacher: Rachel Middleton-Lee
- Gender: Coeducational
- Age: 11 to 18
- Enrolment: 1350
- Houses: Cedar; Maple; Oak; Rowan
- Website: www.woodlands.derby.sch.uk

Allestree Woodlands School (formerly Woodlands School) is a coeducational academy secondary school and sixth form in Derby, England.

== Admissions ==
The academy currently has around 1,350 students on roll. The school enrols an average of 220 students each year.

== History ==
The academy was opened as Woodlands Secondary Modern School in 1956. It became a comprehensive in 1975, and was awarded specialist status as a Technology College in September 2004. It converted to an academy in 2012.

The academy had buildings constructed under the CLASP system, however these were demolished throughout 2016 as part of the academy's renovation.

In 2013, the academy was approved under the Priority School Building Programme, along with seven other Derby City schools. The new buildings were designed by Maber with a budget of £13.9 million.

Construction of the new site was managed by Bowmer & Kirkland. Demolition of parts of the old academy buildings began in late 2014, and construction of the new buildings beginning soon after.

== Houses ==
The academy has four houses, named after different common woodland trees. Each house represented by a colour.

- Cedar (yellow)
- Maple (red)
- Oak (green)
- Rowan (blue)

The academy is managed differently to other schools with houses carrying much more than ceremonial roles. Secondary Students are required to wear a school tie with corresponding house colours and are assigned a Head of House who has extra disciplinary control over students, There are 8 forms in each year, each is numbered as: Year, first letter of house name, and either 1 or 2.

== Academic performance ==
The academy usually obtains average or higher than average Secondary results. However, it has a lower than average Progress 8 score of -0.2.

In a 2024 Ofsted inspection, the school was rated as Good, the second rating in the Ofsted four-point system.

== Notable former pupils ==
- Chris Beardsley, former footballer
- Nigel Clough, former footballer, former manager of Derby County Football club and Burton Albion Football club
- Bob Laxton, former MP for Derby North
- John Whitby, MP for Derbyshire Dales, and previously the lead singer for The Beyond
