= 2023 Derby City Council election =

2023 English local election

- 4 May 2023

All 51 seats to Derby City Council 26 seats needed for a majority
- Turnout: 32.4%
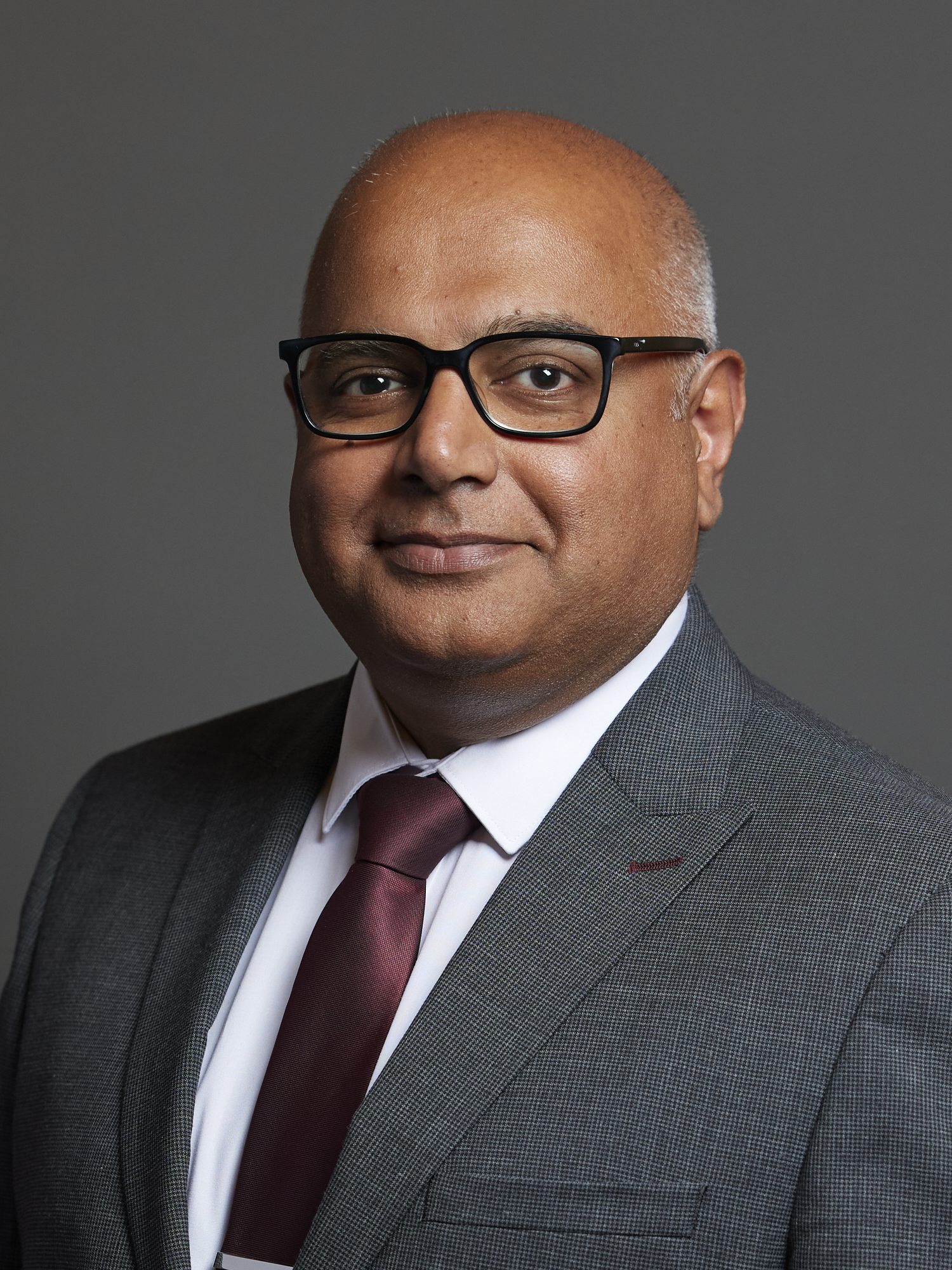

	First party	Second party	Third party
Leader	Baggy Shanker	Chris Poulter	Alan Graves
Party	Labour	Conservative	Reform
Last election	16 seats, 36.1%	18 seats, 32.4%	6 seats, 8.0%
Seats won	23	15	6
Seat change	▲7	▼3	Steady
Popular vote	64,982	41,622	18,472
Percentage	41.2%	26.4%	11.7%
Swing	▲5.1%	▼6.0%	▲3.7%
	Fourth party	Fifth party
Leader	Ajit Atwal	N/A
Party	Liberal Democrats	Independent
Last election	8 seats, 16.9%	3 seats, 2.7%
Seats won	4	3
Seat change	▼4	Steady
Popular vote	23,276	5,332
Percentage	14.7%	3.4%
Swing	▼2.2%	▲0.7%
- Winner of each seat at the 2023 Derby City Council election
Leader before election
Chris Poulter
Conservative (NOC)
Leader after election
Baggy Shanker
Labour (NOC)

The 2023 Derby City Council election took place on 4 May 2023 to elect all 51 members of Derby City Council in Derbyshire, England. This was on the same day as other local elections across England.

New ward boundaries were drawn up for this election, although the number of councillors remained 51. This election also marked a change in the electoral pattern for the city council. Prior to this election a third of the council was elected at a time three years out of every four. From this election onwards the whole council would be elected together every four years.

Prior to the election the council was under no overall control, being run by a Conservative minority administration. The council remained under no overall control after the election but Labour overtook the Conservatives to become the largest party. Labour group leader Baggy Shanker was appointed leader of the council at the subsequent annual council meeting on 24 May 2023, leading a Labour minority administration.

While some have reported Reform Derby as being synonymous with Reform UK, the parties are in fact distinct but affiliated entities.

== Summary ==
=== Election result ===
Following the results, the council remained in no overall control, with Labour becoming the largest party.

2023 Derby City Council election
Party	Candidates	Seats	Gains	Losses	Net gain/loss	Seats %	Votes %	Votes	+/−
Labour	51	23	4	0	▲7	45.1	41.2	64,982	+5.1
Conservative	37	15	0	0	▼3	29.4	26.4	41,622	–6.0
Reform	51	6	0	0	Steady	11.8	11.7	18,472	+3.7
Liberal Democrats	51	4	0	4	▼4	7.8	14.7	23,276	–2.2
Independent	8	3	0	0	Steady	5.9	3.4	5,322	+0.7
Green	11	0	0	0	Steady	0.0	2.7	4,228	–1.1

== Ward results ==
Asterisks denote incumbent councillors who sought re-election.

=== Abbey ===
Abbey (3 seats)
Party	Candidate	Votes	%	±%
Labour	Carmel Ashby	1,359	66.2	
Labour	Sue Bosner*	1,347	65.6	
Labour	Paul Hezelgrave*	1,171	57.0	
Liberal Democrats	Allison Burke	353	17.2	
Conservative	Munawar Chaudhary	341	16.6	
Conservative	Adam Hurt	308	15.0	
Green	Molly Christodoulou	277	13.5	
Liberal Democrats	Ann Crosby	276	13.4	
Reform	Julie Paxton	195	9.5	
Liberal Democrats	Simon Ferrigno	191	9.3	
Reform	Alan Cokayne	134	6.5	
Reform	Stephen Peach	114	5.6	
Independent	Ian Toone	96	4.7	
Turnout			24.8	
Labour gain from Liberal Democrats				
Labour hold				
Labour hold				

=== Allestree ===
Allestree (3 seats)
Party	Candidate	Votes	%	±%
Conservative	Ged Potter*	2,413	53.9	
Conservative	Steve Hassall*	2,283	51.0	
Conservative	Kieran McGeehan	1,992	44.5	
Labour	Sally Green	1,312	29.3	
Labour	Patrick Green	1,257	28.1	
Labour	Adam Hounslow-Eyre	1,153	25.8	
Green	Helen Hitchcock	596	13.3	
Green	Tony Mott	528	11.8	
Green	Samuel Ward	455	10.2	
Reform	Graham Leeming	304	6.8	
Reform	Elaine Lumley	273	6.1	
Liberal Democrats	Will Berry	250	5.6	
Liberal Democrats	Paul Lind	219	4.9	
Liberal Democrats	Ahmed Hamzah	197	4.4	
Reform	David Adams	188	4.2	
Turnout			43.1	
Conservative hold				
Conservative hold				
Conservative hold				

=== Alvaston North ===
Alvaston North (3 seats)
Party	Candidate	Votes	%	±%
Reform	Alan Graves*	1,720	60.8	
Reform	John Evans*	1,533	54.2	
Reform	Kirk Kus*	1,510	53.4	
Labour Co-op	Viv Pointon	1,042	36.8	
Labour Co-op	John Banks	997	35.2	
Labour Co-op	Haf Rehman	858	30.3	
Conservative	Chloe Kelly	294	10.4	
Liberal Democrats	Preetinder Butter	158	5.6	
Independent	David Gale	142	5.0	
Liberal Democrats	Glenda Howcroft	130	4.6	
Liberal Democrats	Matthew Neiland	104	3.7	
Turnout			26.9	
Reform win (new seat)				
Reform win (new seat)				
Reform win (new seat)				

=== Alvaston South ===
Alvaston South (3 seats)
Party	Candidate	Votes	%	±%
Reform	Alan Lindsey*	1,513	55.6	
Reform	Stephen Fowke	1,435	52.7	
Reform	Timothy Prosser*	1,380	50.7	
Labour Co-op	Bethany Madden	1,126	41.4	
Labour Co-op	Roger Dale	1,108	40.7	
Labour Co-op	Emma Shaw	1,048	38.5	
Conservative	Zach Wayman	304	11.2	
Liberal Democrats	Stephen Allen	102	3.7	
Liberal Democrats	Ian Care	88	3.2	
Liberal Democrats	Marco Slowinski	64	2.4	
Turnout			29.5	
Reform win (new seat)				
Reform win (new seat)				
Reform win (new seat)				

=== Arboretum ===
Arboretum (3 seats)
Party	Candidate	Votes	%	±%
Labour	Shiraz Khan*	1,890	78.5	
Labour	Gulfraz Nawaz*	1,738	72.2	
Labour	Cecile Wright	1,372	57.0	
Conservative	Matlub Hussain	1,073	44.5	
Independent	Sassi Bartlett	233	9.7	
Liberal Democrats	Daniel Holmes	230	9.5	
Liberal Democrats	Alan Pickersgill	188	7.8	
Liberal Democrats	Jairo Marrero	177	7.3	
Reform	Anthony Blaney	128	5.3	
Reform	Patrick Delaney	121	5.0	
Reform	Jean-Christian Gouy De Muyncke	76	3.2	
Turnout			29.6	
Labour hold				
Labour hold				
Labour hold				

=== Blagreaves ===
Blagreaves (3 seats)
Party	Candidate	Votes	%	±%
Labour Co-op	Sara Bolton	1,931	47.7	
Labour Co-op	Saquib Amin	1,898	46.9	
Labour Co-op	Hardyal Dhindsa *	1,896	46.9	
Liberal Democrats	Danielle Lind*	1,836	45.4	
Liberal Democrats	Joe Naitta*	1,736	42.9	
Liberal Democrats	Farhatullah Khan	1,505	37.2	
Conservative	Peter Berry	415	10.3	
Reform	Hardip Naitta	390	9.6	
Reform	Jeanette Russell	274	6.8	
Reform	Owen Garnett	256	6.3	
Turnout			40.8	
Labour gain from Liberal Democrats				
Labour gain from Liberal Democrats				
Labour gain from Liberal Democrats				

Hardyal Dhindsa had been an incumbent councillor for Normanton Ward.

=== Chaddesden East ===
Chaddesden East (2 seats)
Party	Candidate	Votes	%	±%
Conservative	Jerry Pearce*	966	51.7	
Conservative	John Wright	806	43.2	
Labour	Becky Everett	739	39.6	
Labour	Tom Spray	566	30.3	
Reform	Paul Bysh	239	12.8	
Reform	Stephen Evans	211	11.3	
Green	Andreas Christodoulou	120	6.4	
Liberal Democrats	Janet Williams	47	2.5	
Liberal Democrats	Mark Smith	40	2.1	
Turnout			30.4	
Conservative win (new seat)				
Conservative win (new seat)				

=== Chaddesden North ===
Chaddesden North (2 seats)
Party	Candidate	Votes	%	±%
Liberal Democrats	Richard Hudson	605	38.5	
Labour Co-op	Neil Wilson	582	37.1	
Labour Co-op	Jonathan Bayliss	567	36.1	
Liberal Democrats	James Testro*	518	33.0	
Conservative	Jakob Marshall	359	22.9	
Conservative	Edward Harrison	316	20.1	
Reform	Christopher Evans	101	6.4	
Reform	Ian Crompton	91	5.8	
Turnout			24.1	
Liberal Democrats win (new seat)				
Labour Co-op win (new seat)				

Incumbent James Testro had been elected as a Conservative, but left the party in March 2021 and subsequently defected to the Liberal Democrats.

=== Chaddesden West ===
Chaddesden West (2 seats)
Party	Candidate	Votes	%	±%
Labour Co-op	Martin Rawson*	732	51.2	
Labour Co-op	Kathy Kozlowski	680	47.6	
Conservative	Tracey Pearce*	540	37.8	
Conservative	Ashley Clarke	526	36.8	
Reform	Paul Bettany	113	7.9	
Reform	Ann Graves	91	6.4	
Liberal Democrats	Timothy Holyoake	90	6.3	
Liberal Democrats	Ashley Stirland	86	6.0	
Turnout			22.9	
Labour Co-op win (new seat)				
Labour Co-op win (new seat)				

=== Chellaston & Shelton Lock ===
Chellaston & Shelton Lock (3 seats)
Party	Candidate	Votes	%	±%
Independent	Philip Ingall*	1,620	43.7	
Independent	Celia Ingall*	1,527	41.2	
Independent	Stephen Lakin	967	26.1	
Conservative	Ross McCristal	905	24.4	
Conservative	Harvey Jennings*	887	23.9	
Labour	Chanaka Dissanayake	750	20.2	
Reform	Russel Armstrong	735	19.8	
Conservative	Matt Brentnall	722	19.5	
Labour	Jason Thakar	710	19.1	
Labour	Nathan Thaker	659	17.8	
Reform	Paul Randle	585	15.8	
Reform	Amanda Gouy De Muyncke	451	12.2	
Green	Ria Ghei	247	6.7	
Liberal Democrats	Valerie French	146	3.9	
Liberal Democrats	Clive Holland	116	3.1	
Liberal Democrats	Andrew Parnall	96	2.6	
Turnout			33.5	
Independent win (new seat)				
Independent win (new seat)				
Independent win (new seat)				

=== Darley ===
Darley (3 seats)
Party	Candidate	Votes	%	±%
Labour	Martin Repton*	2,510	68.7	
Labour	Alison Martin*	2,387	65.3	
Labour	Carmel Swan*	2,101	57.5	
Green	Lucy Giuliano	932	25.5	
Conservative	Alan Grimadell	864	23.6	
Conservative	Julio Abraham	805	22.0	
Liberal Democrats	Carol Bull	399	10.9	
Liberal Democrats	Marion Hall	239	6.5	
Liberal Democrats	Ann Jackman	231	6.3	
Reform	Louise Boole	182	5.0	
Reform	Stephen Handley	160	4.4	
Reform	Sharon Saxton	156	4.3	
Turnout			37.0	
Labour hold				
Labour hold				
Labour hold				

=== Littleover ===
Littleover (3 seats)
Party	Candidate	Votes	%	±%
Liberal Democrats	Lucy Care*	2,373	58.7	
Liberal Democrats	Ajit Atwal*	1,950	48.2	
Liberal Democrats	Emily Lonsdale*	1,929	47.7	
Labour Co-op	Gurdev Dhillon	1,426	35.3	
Labour Co-op	Sophia Brown	1,293	32.0	
Labour Co-op	Simon Parkes	1,190	29.4	
Conservative	Balbir Samra	569	14.1	
Conservative	Ed Packham	520	12.9	
Conservative	Matthew Osborne	517	12.8	
Reform	David Jowitt	146	3.6	
Reform	Jacqueline Blaney	112	2.8	
Reform	Douglas Banton	108	2.7	
Turnout			40.9	
Liberal Democrats hold				
Liberal Democrats hold				
Liberal Democrats hold				

=== Mackworth & New Zealand ===
Mackworth & New Zealand (3 seats)
Party	Candidate	Votes	%	±%
Conservative	Gaurav Pandey*	1,231	43.9	
Labour	John Whitby*	1,190	42.4	
Labour	Ndukwe Onuoha	1,168	41.7	
Conservative	Adrian Pegg	1,114	39.7	
Labour	Nwando Umeh	1,084	38.7	
Conservative	Mick Walsh	1,044	37.2	
Independent	Diane Froggatt*	381	13.6	
Green	Jak Carr	305	10.9	
Reform	Ben Sage	179	6.4	
Reform	Nigel Caulton	174	6.2	
Liberal Democrats	Sarah Tillett	167	6.0	
Reform	Daniel Bamford	162	5.8	
Liberal Democrats	Carmine Branco	129	4.6	
Liberal Democrats	Stuart Handley	84	3.0	
Turnout			29.7	
Conservative win (new seat)				
Labour win (new seat)				
Labour win (new seat)				

=== Mickleover ===
Mickleover (3 seats)
Party	Candidate	Votes	%	±%
Conservative	Alison Holmes*	2,274	48.3	
Conservative	Matthew Holmes*	2,250	47.8	
Conservative	Miles Pattison*	2,039	43.3	
Liberal Democrats	Maggie Hird	1,610	34.2	
Labour	Nick Northover	1,155	24.5	
Liberal Democrats	Elle McAllister	1,138	24.2	
Liberal Democrats	Greg Webb	1,071	22.7	
Labour	Angela Kinsey	968	20.5	
Labour	Paul Sharratt	854	18.1	
Green	Holly Rushbrooke	330	7.0	
Reform	Jacqueline Banton	158	3.4	
Reform	Adrian Hayden	151	3.2	
Reform	Lisa Hodgson	136	2.9	
Turnout			42.0	
Conservative hold				
Conservative hold				
Conservative hold				

=== Normanton ===
Normanton (3 seats)
Party	Candidate	Votes	%	±%
Labour Co-op	Jangir Khan*	2,654	77.6	
Labour Co-op	Balbir Sandhu*	2,468	72.2	
Labour Co-op	Gurkiran Thandi	2,236	65.4	
Conservative	Habib Tafseer	1,278	37.4	
Independent	Simon Bacon	356	10.4	
Liberal Democrats	Lindsay Smith	295	8.6	
Reform	Derek Gould	220	6.4	
Liberal Democrats	Bob Troup	200	5.8	
Reform	Katie Thomas	194	5.7	
Reform	Laoni Cooper	180	5.3	
Liberal Democrats	Geoffrey O'Farrell	177	5.2	
Turnout			33.7	
Labour hold				
Labour hold				
Labour hold				

=== Oakwood ===
Oakwood (3 seats)
Party	Candidate	Votes	%	±%
Conservative	Matthew Eyre*	2,287	70.1	
Conservative	Freya Trewhella	2,075	63.6	
Conservative	Jamie Mulhall	1,919	58.9	
Labour Co-op	Antony Stevenson	731	22.4	
Labour Co-op	Kehinde Johnson-Lawal	710	21.8	
Labour Co-op	Ranjit Seehra	681	20.9	
Liberal Democrats	Frank Harwood	355	10.9	
Liberal Democrats	Chris Wright	349	10.7	
Reform	Jim Wise	198	6.1	
Liberal Democrats	Andrew Bird	185	5.7	
Reform	Timothy Adams	152	4.7	
Reform	Monica Lindsey	139	4.3	
Turnout			34.0	
Conservative hold				
Conservative hold				
Conservative hold				

=== Sinfin & Osmaston ===
Sinfin & Osmaston (3 seats)
Party	Candidate	Votes	%	±%
Labour Co-op	Baggy Shanker*	1,589	72.0	
Labour Co-op	Sarah Chambers	1,553	70.4	
Labour Co-op	Nadine Peatfield*	1,537	69.6	
Conservative	Jay Joshi	597	27.0	
Reform	Brenden May	319	14.5	
Reform	Maria Adeseun	304	13.8	
Reform	Greg Szemraj	262	11.9	
Green	Kate Brown	175	7.9	
Liberal Democrats	John Arguile	124	5.6	
Liberal Democrats	Mike Carr	91	4.1	
Liberal Democrats	Lee Thomas	71	3.2	
Turnout			24.7	
Labour Co-op win (new seat)				
Labour Co-op win (new seat)				
Labour Co-op win (new seat)				

=== Spondon ===
Spondon (3 seats)
Party	Candidate	Votes	%	±%
Conservative	Christopher Poulter*	1,611	52.9	
Conservative	Nicola Roulstone*	1,589	52.1	
Conservative	Jonathan Smale*	1,589	52.1	
Labour	Ruth Coates	1,049	34.4	
Labour	Adrian Axtell	987	32.4	
Labour	Pauline Inwood	973	31.9	
Green	Stevie Hardy	263	8.6	
Liberal Democrats	Helen Harrison	251	8.2	
Liberal Democrats	Philip Wray	217	7.1	
Reform	Cameron Cox	186	6.1	
Reform	Kathryn Wills	168	5.5	
Reform	Shane Walker	165	5.4	
Liberal Democrats	Baz Jabbar	93	3.1	
Turnout			32.8	
Conservative hold				
Conservative hold				
Conservative hold				

Jonathan Smale had been a Councillor for Chaddesden Ward, but chose to seek election in Spondon.
