= Walter Johnson (politician) =

British politician (1917–2003)

Member of Parliament for Derby South
- In office 1970–1983
- Preceded by: Philip Noel-Baker
- Succeeded by: Margaret Beckett

President of the Railway Clerks' Association
- In office 1977–1981
- Preceded by: Tom Bradley
- Succeeded by: Jim Mills

Personal details
- Born: Walter Hamlet Johnson; 21 November 1917 Hertford, Hertfordshire, England
- Died: 12 April 2003 (aged 85) Haywards Heath, West Sussex, England
- Party: Labour

Walter Hamlet Johnson (21 November 1917 – 12 April 2003) was a British Labour Party politician.

== Early life ==
Johnson was born in Hertford.

== Political career ==
Before being elected, Johnson stood several times for Parliament without success. In the 1955 General Election he fought Bristol West, but was defeated by the Conservative Cabinet Minister Walter Monckton. He contested South Bedfordshire in 1959, and a by-election at Acton in 1968 that was one of three Labour seats lost that day (in Johnson's case to the future Cabinet Minister Kenneth Baker).

Following the retirement of Philip Noel-Baker as the Member of Parliament, Johnson retained Derby South at the 1970 general election for the Labour Party, and was an assistant government whip from 1974 to 1975. He stood down as an MP at the 1983, after which he was succeeded by Margaret Beckett.

Johnson was partly funded by the Transport Salaried Staffs' Association. He was treasurer of that Association from 1965 to 1977.

== Death ==
He died in Haywards Heath, aged 85.

Parliament of the United Kingdom
Preceded by Philip Noel-Baker	Member of Parliament for Derby South; 1970–1983	Succeeded by Margaret Beckett
Trade union offices
Preceded by Tom Bradley	President of the Transport Salaried Staffs' Association; 1977–1981	Succeeded by Jim Mills
