= Margaret Beckett =

British politician (born 1943)

The Right Honourable The Baroness Beckett GBE PC
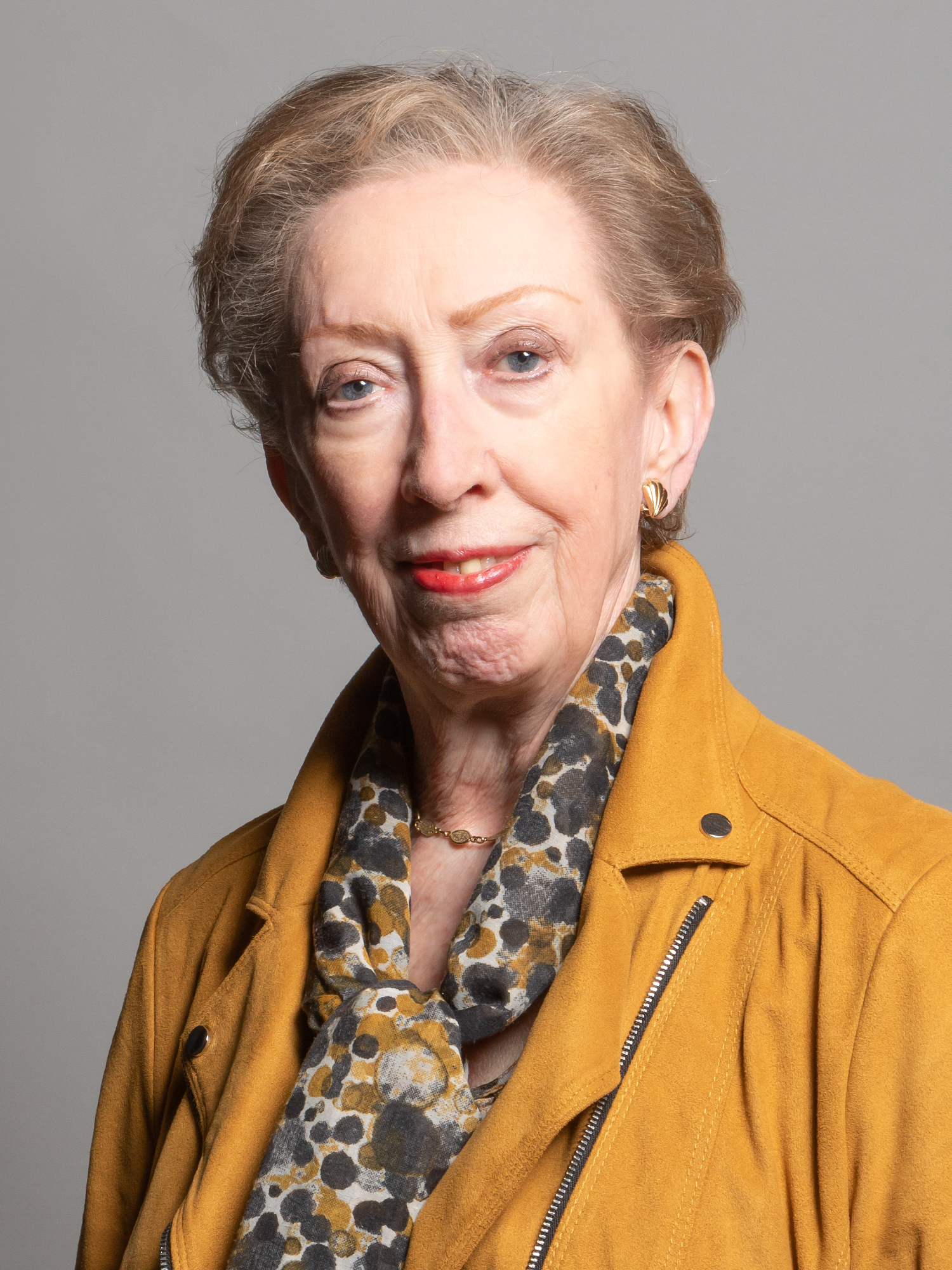
- Official portrait, 2020

Foreign Secretary
- In office 5 May 2006 – 28 June 2007
- Prime Minister: Tony Blair
- Preceded by: Jack Straw
- Succeeded by: David Miliband

Secretary of State for Environment, Food and Rural Affairs
- In office 8 June 2001 – 5 May 2006
- Prime Minister: Tony Blair
- Preceded by: Nick Brown (Note: As Agriculture, Fisheries and Food Minister.); John Prescott (Note: As Environment, Transport and the Regions Secretary.)
- Succeeded by: David Miliband

Leader of the House of Commons Lord President of the Council
- In office 27 July 1998 – 8 June 2001
- Prime Minister: Tony Blair
- Preceded by: Ann Taylor
- Succeeded by: Robin Cook

Secretary of State for Trade and Industry President of the Board of Trade
- In office 2 May 1997 – 27 July 1998
- Prime Minister: Tony Blair
- Preceded by: Ian Lang
- Succeeded by: Peter Mandelson

Leader of the Opposition
- In office 12 May 1994 – 21 July 1994
- Monarch: Elizabeth II
- Prime Minister: John Major
- Preceded by: John Smith
- Succeeded by: Tony Blair

Deputy Leader of the Labour Party
- In office 18 July 1992 – 21 July 1994
- Leader: John Smith
- Preceded by: Roy Hattersley
- Succeeded by: John Prescott
Junior ministerial offices
Minister of State for Housing and Planning
In office 3 October 2008 – 5 June 2009
Prime Minister	Gordon Brown
Preceded by	Caroline Flint
Succeeded by	John Healey
Parliamentary Under-Secretary of State for Education and Science
In office 12 March 1976 – 4 May 1979
Prime Minister	Harold Wilson; James Callaghan
Preceded by	Joan Lestor
Succeeded by	Rhodes Boyson
Shadow cabinet portfolios
1995–1997	Trade and Industry
1994–1995	Health
1992–1994	Commons Leader
1989–1992	Chief Treasury Secretary

Member of the House of Lords
- Lord Temporal
- Life peerage 14 August 2024

Member of Parliament
- In office 9 June 1983 – 30 May 2024
- Preceded by: Walter Johnson
- Succeeded by: Baggy Shanker
- Constituency: Derby South
- In office 10 October 1974 – 7 April 1979
- Preceded by: Dick Taverne
- Succeeded by: Kenneth Carlisle
- Constituency: Lincoln

Personal details
- Born: Margaret Mary Jackson; 15 January 1943 (age 83) Ashton-under-Lyne, Lancashire, England
- Party: Labour
- Spouse: Lionel Beckett (m. 1979; died 2021)
- Education: Manchester College of Science and Technology (BSc)
- Margaret Beckett's voice Beckett makes a statement on climate change on behalf of the European Commission and Council; Recorded 16 November 2005

Margaret Mary Beckett, Baroness Beckett (née Jackson; born 15 January 1943) is a British politician who was the United Kingdom's first female Foreign Secretary (from 2006 to 2007) and a member of Parliament (MP) for more than 45 years, first from 1974 to 1979 and then from 1983 to 2024. A member of the Labour Party, she served as a minister under Prime Ministers Harold Wilson, James Callaghan, Tony Blair and Gordon Brown. Beckett was Deputy Leader of the Opposition and Deputy Leader of the Labour Party from 1992 to 1994, and briefly Leader of the Opposition and acting Leader of the Labour Party following John Smith's death in 1994. A member of the Labour Party, she served as MP for Lincoln from 1974 to 1979, and for Derby South from 1983 to 2024. Her 45 years in the House of Commons makes her the female MP in the Commons with the longest service overall (Harriet Harman has longer continuous service), and she was the last sitting MP who served in the Labour governments of the 1970s.

Beckett was first elected to Parliament at the October 1974 general election for Lincoln and held junior positions in the governments of Harold Wilson and James Callaghan. She lost her seat at the 1979 general election, but returned to the Commons in 1983 as MP for Derby South. She was appointed to Neil Kinnock's shadow cabinet shortly afterwards; she was elected Deputy Leader of the Labour Party in 1992, becoming the first woman to hold that role. When John Smith died in 1994, Beckett became the first woman to lead the Labour Party, though only in a temporary capacity—Blair won the election to replace Smith shortly afterward and assumed the substantive leadership.

After Labour returned to power in 1997, and as one of 101 female Labour MPs elected, Beckett became a member of Blair's Cabinet initially as President of the Board of Trade, the first female holder of that office. She later served as Leader of the House of Commons and Secretary of State for Environment, Food and Rural Affairs, before becoming Foreign Secretary in 2006, the first woman to hold that position, and—after Margaret Thatcher—the second woman to hold one of the Great Offices of State. Following Blair's resignation as prime minister in 2007, Beckett was not initially given a position by Brown, Blair's successor; after she had spent a period on the backbenches, Brown appointed her to his cabinet as Minister of State for Housing and Planning in 2008, before she left the government for the last time in 2009. After Labour lost power following the 2010 general election, she sat on the opposition backbenches until standing down at the 2024 general election. She was shortly thereafter appointed to the House of Lords.

== Early life ==
Margaret Beckett was born Margaret Mary Jackson in 1943, in Ashton-under-Lyne, Lancashire, into the family of a disabled Congregationalist carpenter father and an Irish Catholic teacher mother. Her father died early, precipitating family poverty. She had two sisters, one later a nun, the other later a doctor and mother of three. She was educated at the Notre Dame High School for Girls in Norwich, then at University of Manchester Institute of Science and Technology, where she took a degree in metallurgy.

Beckett was an active member of the Students' Union and served on its council. In 1961, she joined Associated Electrical Industries as a student apprentice in metallurgy. She also joined the Transport and General Workers Union in 1964. In 1966, she joined the University of Manchester as an experiment officer in its metallurgy department, and in 1970 went to work for the Labour Party as a researcher in industrial policy.

== Member of Parliament ==
In 1973, Beckett was selected as Labour candidate for Lincoln, which the party wanted to win back from ex-Labour MP Dick Taverne, who had won the Lincoln by-election in March 1973 standing as the Democratic Labour candidate. At the February 1974 general election, Beckett lost to Taverne by 1,297 votes. Following the election, she worked as a researcher for Judith Hart, the Minister for Overseas Development at the Foreign Office. Harold Wilson called the October 1974 general election, and Beckett again stood against Taverne in Lincoln. This time Beckett became the MP, with a majority of 984 votes. Almost immediately following her election she was appointed as Judith Hart's Parliamentary private secretary. Harold Wilson made her a Whip in 1975, promoted to Parliamentary under-secretary of state at the Department of Education and Science, replacing Joan Lestor, who had resigned in protest over spending cuts.

Beckett remained in that position until she lost her seat at the 1979 general election. The Conservative candidate Kenneth Carlisle narrowly won the seat with a 602-vote majority, the first time the Conservatives had won at Lincoln since 1935. She joined Granada Television as a researcher in 1979. Out of Parliament, and now known as Margaret Beckett after her marriage, she was elected to Labour's National Executive Committee in 1980, and supported the left-winger Tony Benn in the 1981 Labour deputy leadership election narrowly won by Denis Healey. She was the subject of a vociferous attack by Joan Lestor at the conference. Beckett was selected to stand at the 1983 general election as the Labour candidate in the parliamentary constituency of Derby South following the retirement of the sitting MP, Walter Johnson. At the election she retained the seat with a small majority of 421 votes. In March 2022, Beckett announced she would end her parliamentary career, standing down as MP for Derby South at the next general election.

=== Shadow Cabinet and Deputy Leader, 1984–1994 ===
Upon returning to the House of Commons, Beckett gradually moved away from the left, supporting incumbent leader Neil Kinnock against Benn in 1988. By this time she was a front bencher, as a spokeswoman on Social Security since 1984, becoming a member of the shadow cabinet in 1989 as Shadow Chief Secretary to the Treasury. Following the 1992 general election she was elected Deputy Leader of the Labour Party and served under John Smith as Shadow Leader of the House of Commons. She became a Member of the Privy Council in 1993. She was the first woman to serve as deputy leader of the Labour Party.

Following the sudden death of John Smith from a heart attack on 12 May 1994, Beckett became Acting Leader of the Labour Party, the party's constitution providing for the automatic succession of the deputy leader for the remainder of the leadership term, upon the death or resignation of an incumbent leader in opposition. In times when the party is in opposition, party leaders are subject to annual reelection at the time of the annual party conference; accordingly, Beckett was constitutionally entitled to remain in office as acting leader until the 1994 Conference; however, the party's National Executive Committee (NEC) rapidly decided to bring forward the election for Labour Leader and Deputy Leader to July 1994.

Beckett decided to run for the position of Labour Leader, but came last in 1994 leadership election, behind Tony Blair and John Prescott. The deputy leadership was contested at the same time; Beckett was also defeated in this contest, coming second behind Prescott. Though she failed in both contests, she was retained in the shadow cabinet by Blair as Shadow Health Secretary.

A footnote to her ten-week tenure as caretaker leader of the Labour Party is that she was the leader at the time of the 1994 European Parliament election, which were held four weeks after she assumed the position. Labour's election campaign had been long in the planning under Smith, whose sudden death led to a "sympathy rise" in opinion polls for Labour, compounding what had already been a strong lead over the Conservatives. Consequently, Labour had a commanding victory in what was its best result in any of the four European elections held since 1979. The two Labour leadership elections followed six weeks later on 21 July 1994 and the Labour electorate did not appear to attribute any credit for the successful European election result to Beckett's chance-ordained position as acting leader in the four weeks immediately prior to the election.

Under Blair's leadership, Beckett was the Shadow Secretary of State for Health, and then from 1995 the Shadow President of the Board of Trade. She was one of the leading critics of the government when the Scott Report published its findings into the Arms-to-Iraq scandal in 1996. In 2025 Labour Party deputy leadership election, Beckett recalled that being deputy leader was a "ghastly job".

=== In government, 1997–2001 ===
The Labour Party was elected to government in a landslide in the 1997 general election and Beckett held a number of senior positions in the Blair government. Following the election she was appointed President of the Board of Trade (a position whose title later reverted to Secretary of State for Trade and Industry); the first woman to have held the post. She was succeeded by Peter Mandelson in July 1998.

Beckett was then Leader of the House of Commons from 1998 until her replacement by Robin Cook in June 2001. Her tenure saw the introduction of Westminster Hall debates, which are debates held in a small chamber near Westminster Hall on topics of interest to individual MPs, committee reports, and other matters that would not ordinarily be debated in the Commons chamber. Debates that take place in Westminster Hall are often more consensual and informal, and can address the concerns of backbenchers. She received admiration for her work as Leader of the House, working on this and a number of other elements of the Labour government's modernisation agenda for Parliament. In 2000, she expressed republican sympathies.

=== Secretary of State for Environment, Food and Rural Affairs, 2001–2006 ===
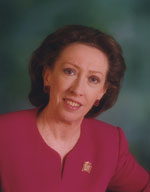
Beckett as Environment Secretary

Following the 2001 general election, Beckett became Secretary of State at the new Department for the Environment, Food and Rural Affairs (DEFRA), created after the Ministry of Agriculture, Fisheries and Food (MAFF) was abolished in the wake of perceived mismanagement of the foot-and-mouth epidemic in 2001. The new department also incorporated some of the functions of the former Department for the Environment, Transport and the Regions (DETR).

Beckett rejected demands for an expansion of nuclear power from a lobby including energy minister Brian Wilson and Downing Street staff. She argued there was no need for new nuclear for at least 15 years given current energy prices and generation capacity. The 2003 energy white paper stated that "the current economics of nuclear power make it unattractive" and there were no proposals for new nuclear power stations.

Beckett held the position of Secretary of State for Environment, Food and Rural Affairs until May 2006, when she was succeeded by David Miliband. Beckett was on the front line of the government's efforts to tackle climate change, and attended international conferences on the matter. In a report published on 29 March 2007 by the Environment, Food and Rural Affairs Select Committee, she was criticised for her role in the failures of the Rural Payments Agency when she had been Secretary of State for Environment, Food and Rural Affairs.

=== Foreign Secretary: 2006–2007 ===
Following the 2006 local elections, Blair demoted Foreign Secretary Jack Straw, and appointed Beckett as Straw's successor. She was the first woman to hold the post, and only the second woman (after Margaret Thatcher) to hold one of the Great Offices of State.

Some commentators claim that Beckett was promoted to Foreign Secretary because she was considered to be a 'safe pair of hands' and a loyal member of the Cabinet. Her experience at DEFRA in dealing with international climate change issues has also been cited as a factor in the move.

Beckett had to adapt quickly to her diplomatic role; within a few hours of her appointment as Foreign Secretary, she flew to the United Nations in New York City for an urgent meeting of foreign ministers to discuss the Iran nuclear weapons crisis. About a month later, she came under fire for not responding quickly enough to the 2006 Lebanon War which saw Israel invade that country, although some reports suggested that the delay was caused by Cabinet division rather than Beckett's reluctance to make a public statement on the matter.

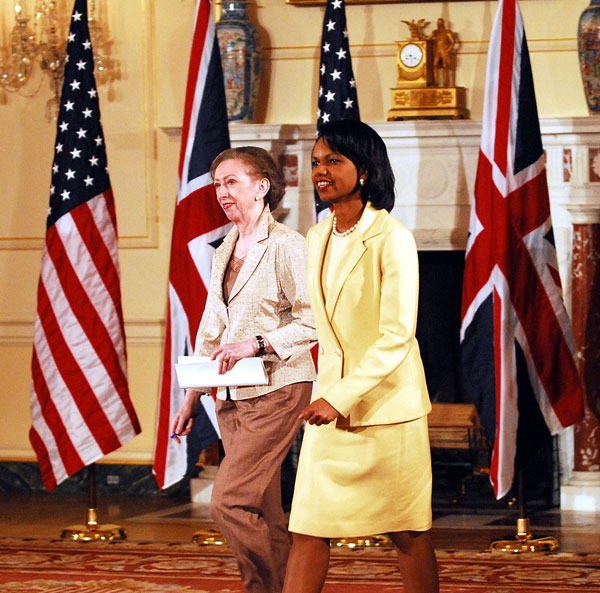
Beckett appears with US Secretary of State, Condoleezza Rice, following her appointment as Foreign Secretary

Beckett is understood to have delegated European issues to the Foreign Office minister responsible for Europe, Geoff Hoon, who, following his demotion as Defence Secretary, continued to attend Cabinet meetings. Hoon and Beckett were said to have a difficult ministerial relationship. As Foreign Secretary, Beckett came in for some trenchant criticism. According to The Times, she did not stand up well in comparison with the previous Foreign Secretary, Jack Straw. The Spectator described her as "at heart, an old, isolationist, pacifist Leftist" and called on her to resign, and the New Statesman accused her of allowing the Foreign Office to become subservient to 10 Downing Street after the tenures of Straw and Robin Cook.

In August 2006, 37 Labour Party members in her Derby South constituency left the party and joined the Liberal Democrats, criticising her approach to the Israeli invasion of Lebanon. Two weeks earlier, Beckett's successor, David Miliband, raised concerns during a cabinet meeting about the failure of Blair and Beckett to call for an immediate ceasefire. Straw and Hilary Benn, then International Development Secretary, also raised concerns. Former minister Michael Meacher said there was "despair, anger and bewilderment" in the Labour Party at the UK's failure to call for an immediate ceasefire.

=== Post-Blair years ===
Upon taking office as prime minister, Gordon Brown made it known that Beckett would not continue as foreign secretary. On 28 June 2007, Brown selected David Miliband as her replacement and Beckett returned to the back benches. It was announced on 29 January 2008 that Beckett would become the new head of the Prime Minister's Intelligence and Security Committee, replacing Paul Murphy, who became the Secretary of State for Wales.

Having been tipped for a possible return to the front bench in July 2008, due to her reputation as a solid media performer, Beckett returned to government in the reshuffle on 3 October 2008 as the Minister of State for Housing in the Department for Communities and Local Government. She attended Cabinet meetings, but was not a full member and was not to be entitled to vote on collective decisions. She ultimately was allowed to return due to her cabinet experience and her economic management in the past. Beckett was a member of the Top Level Group of UK Parliamentarians for Multilateral Nuclear Disarmament and Non-proliferation, established in October 2009. She has served as a member of the Henry Jackson Society Advisory Council.

=== Expenses ===
Beckett was found to have claimed £600 for hanging baskets and pot plants by The Daily Telegraph in the 2009 expenses scandal. As she had no mortgage or rent outstanding it was queried how she managed to claim £72,537 between 2004 and 2008 on a house in her constituency when she was renting out her London flat and living in a grace and favour flat.

=== Bid to become Speaker ===
On 10 June 2009, Beckett announced that she wished to replace Michael Martin as Speaker of the House of Commons. She said: "I think at the moment we have got very considerable problems in Parliament. We have got to make changes.... After the next election, if we have a more finely balanced chamber than we have had in the recent past, it will be a very different ball game.... I hope I can help us deal with that." Beckett received 74 votes in the first round and 70 votes in the second round of the 2009 Speaker election, reaching the third place as the strongest Labour candidate both times but considerably trailing the two Conservative frontrunners John Bercow and George Young. She withdrew following the second round of voting. In August 2009, Beckett wrote to Sir Christopher Kelly, Chairman of the Committee on Standards in Public Life which was investigating MPs' expenses. In the letter, she says the allowances do not adequately cover MPs' costs, which include political campaigns. The Telegraph criticised the "self-pitying" letter, saying it will fuel "concern that some MPs are not genuinely committed to reform".

=== Alternative Vote referendum ===
On 26 November 2010, Beckett was announced as the President of the NOtoAV campaign, which campaigned to retain the First Past the Post (FPTP) electoral system at the 2011 United Kingdom Alternative Vote referendum. She led the campaign to success, and FPTP remains the system used in UK parliamentary elections.

=== 2015 Labour leadership election ===
Beckett was one of 36 Labour MPs to nominate Jeremy Corbyn as a candidate in the Labour leadership election of 2015. Later, during an interview with BBC Radio 4's The World at One, after it became known he was in the lead among the candidates, Beckett was asked if she was "a moron" for nominating Corbyn. She replied: "I am one of them." In January 2016, Beckett claimed that Labour would need an "unexpected political miracle" if it were to win under his leadership, and criticised Corbyn for failing to win back the trust of the electorate on welfare reform and mass immigration, saying: "I think we had the right policies towards immigration, but the simple thuggishness of the kind of Ukip and Conservative approach is easier to understand and we didn't overcome those communication difficulties ... We have to try and work on ways to overcome that – I'm not suggesting we've done it yet". She later supported Owen Smith in the failed attempt to replace Corbyn in the 2016 Labour leadership election. In February 2019, she acknowledged during an interview with Sophy Ridge on Sky News that she was "surprised" about how Corbyn had "grown into the job" after taking on the leadership. She further claimed that veteran Conservative MP Kenneth Clarke called Corbyn a "perfectly competent" opposition leader.

=== Beckett report ===
On 16 January 2016, Beckett released "Learning the Lessons from Defeat Taskforce Report", a 35-page report into why the Labour Party lost the 2015 general election after the then deputy leader Harriet Harman requested Beckett investigate the reasons for Labour's failure. Labour's defeat came as a shock to pollsters, whose polls had suggested that the result would be much closer than it eventually was. Ultimately, the Conservatives won a narrow majority.

The report said that explanations including Labour being "anti-business" or "anti-aspiration" were not "significant" factors, saying that "reasons for defeat should be treated with caution and require deeper analysis". The main reasons given for Labour's losses were the perceived weakness of Ed Miliband as party leader, fear of Labour's relationship with the Scottish National Party (SNP) among English voters, a perceived association with the financial crisis under the Brown ministry, and "issues of connection" with voters. The report also said that it would be difficult for Labour to win next time because of changes to constituency boundaries (due in 2018), voter registration changes and restrictions on trade union funding of parties. Beckett said the party should campaign in ordinary language, focus its policy on the condition of Britain in 2020, unite for the 2016 European Union membership referendum, and draw up a five-year media strategy.

The Beckett report was criticised by some on the left wing of British politics as "show[ing] that many Labour politicians still don't really understand why they lost" and blaming factors such as the rise of the SNP on Labour's losses, rather than campaigning against austerity. Others criticised the report for being too broad and too vague in its conclusions. Stephen Bush wrote in the New Statesman that "every bit of the Labour party will have something it can cling to" in the report: He continued:

Supporters of Jeremy Corbyn will take heart from the fact that individual left-wing policies, like the mansion tax, were popular. But Corbyn-sceptics will note that it was voters that went for Tony Blair and David Cameron that failed to back the party in 2015, which they will take as an endorsement of a centrist approach. Ed Miliband's diehard supporters – they do exist, believe it or not – will see the report as an endorsement of the Miliband era policy approach but will argue that a more convincing frontman would have sealed the deal.

Owen Jones, a columnist for The Guardian, said that the left should not fear the Beckett report, saying: "Let's have a full inquest, not in the interests of navel-gazing, but in the interests of winning." According to the Morning Star, many centrist and more right-wing Labour politicians also welcomed the report. In Parliament, Beckett is Chair of the National Security Strategy (Joint Committee), and is a former member of the Intelligence and Security Committee of Parliament and Modernisation of the House of Commons Committee.

=== National Executive Committee chairmanship ===
On 24 November 2020, Beckett was elected to succeed the Transport Salaried Staffs' Association's Andi Fox as the Chair of the Labour Party's National Executive Committee. She was elected unopposed after NEC members from the left of the party staged a virtual walkout, protesting her election over then vice-chair Ian Murray from the Fire Brigades Union. Beckett was criticised after being overheard insulting a fellow NEC member during a Zoom call on 11 March 2021. Beckett thought her microphone was turned off when calling Laura Pidcock a "silly cow", after which Pidcock left the meeting. Beckett apologised immediately and told the BBC the following day: "I deeply regret the remark, which was unjustifiable." Fellow NEC members called on her to resign, while Labour's general secretary David Evans said that complaints against Beckett would be investigated.

== Honours ==
Beckett was sworn of the Privy Council in 1993. She was appointed Dame Commander of the Order of the British Empire (DBE) in the 2013 New Year Honours for public and political service and was promoted to Dame Grand Cross of the Order of the British Empire (GBE) in the 2024 New Year Honours for parliamentary, political and public service. In November 2017, she was awarded the honorary degree of Doctor of the University (DUniv) from the University of Derby. After standing down as an MP, Beckett was nominated for a life peerage in the 2024 Dissolution Honours. She was created Baroness Beckett, of Old Normanton in the City of Derby, on 14 August 2024.

== Personal life ==
She married the chairman of her local Constituency Labour Party, Lionel "Leo" Beckett (born 1926), in August 1979. Beckett employed her husband as her office manager, on a salary up to £30,000. The practice of MPs employing family members has been criticised by some sections of the media on the lines that it promotes nepotism. Although MPs who were first elected in 2017 have been banned from employing family members, the restriction is not retroactive. Leo Beckett had two sons from a previous marriage, and three grandchildren. Beckett and her husband enjoyed caravan holidays throughout her political career. Leo Beckett died in 2021 at the age of 95.

== Notes ==
Parliament of the United Kingdom
Preceded by Dick Taverne	Member of Parliament for Lincoln; 1974–1979	Succeeded by Kenneth Carlisle
Preceded by Walter Johnson	Member of Parliament for Derby South; 1983–2024	Succeeded by Baggy Shanker
Party political offices
Preceded by Roy Hattersley	Deputy Leader of the Labour Party; 1992–1994	Succeeded by John Prescott
Preceded by Andi Fox	Chair of the Labour Party National Executive Committee; 2020–2021	Succeeded by Alice Perry
Political offices
Preceded by Gordon Brown	Shadow Chief Secretary to the Treasury; 1989–1992	Succeeded by Harriet Harman
Preceded by Jack Cunningham	Shadow Leader of the House of Commons; 1992–1994	Succeeded by Nick Brown; Acting
Preceded by John Smith	Leader of the Opposition; 1994	Succeeded by Tony Blair
Preceded by Nick Brown; Acting	Shadow Leader of the House of Commons; 1994	Succeeded by Ann Taylor
Preceded by David Blunkett	Shadow Secretary of State for Health; 1994–1995	Succeeded by Harriet Harman
Preceded by Jack Cunningham	Shadow Secretary of State for Trade and Industry; 1995–1997	Succeeded by Michael Heseltine
Preceded by Ian Lang	President of the Board of Trade; 1997–1998	Succeeded by Peter Mandelson
Preceded by Ian Lang	Secretary of State for Trade and Industry; 1997–1998	Succeeded by Peter Mandelson
Preceded by Ann Taylor	Leader of the House of Commons; 1998–2001	Succeeded by Robin Cook
Preceded by Ann Taylor	Lord President of the Council; 1998–2001	Succeeded by Robin Cook
Preceded by John Prescott as Secretary of State for the Environment, Transport and the Regions	Secretary of State for Environment, Food and Rural Affairs; 2001–2006	Succeeded by David Miliband
Preceded by Nick Brown as Minister of Agriculture, Fisheries and Food	Secretary of State for Environment, Food and Rural Affairs; 2001–2006	Succeeded by David Miliband
Preceded by Jack Straw	Foreign Secretary; 2006–2007	Succeeded by David Miliband
Preceded by Caroline Flint	Minister of State for Housing and Planning; 2008–2009	Succeeded by John Healey
