= Sarah Dines =

British Conservative politician

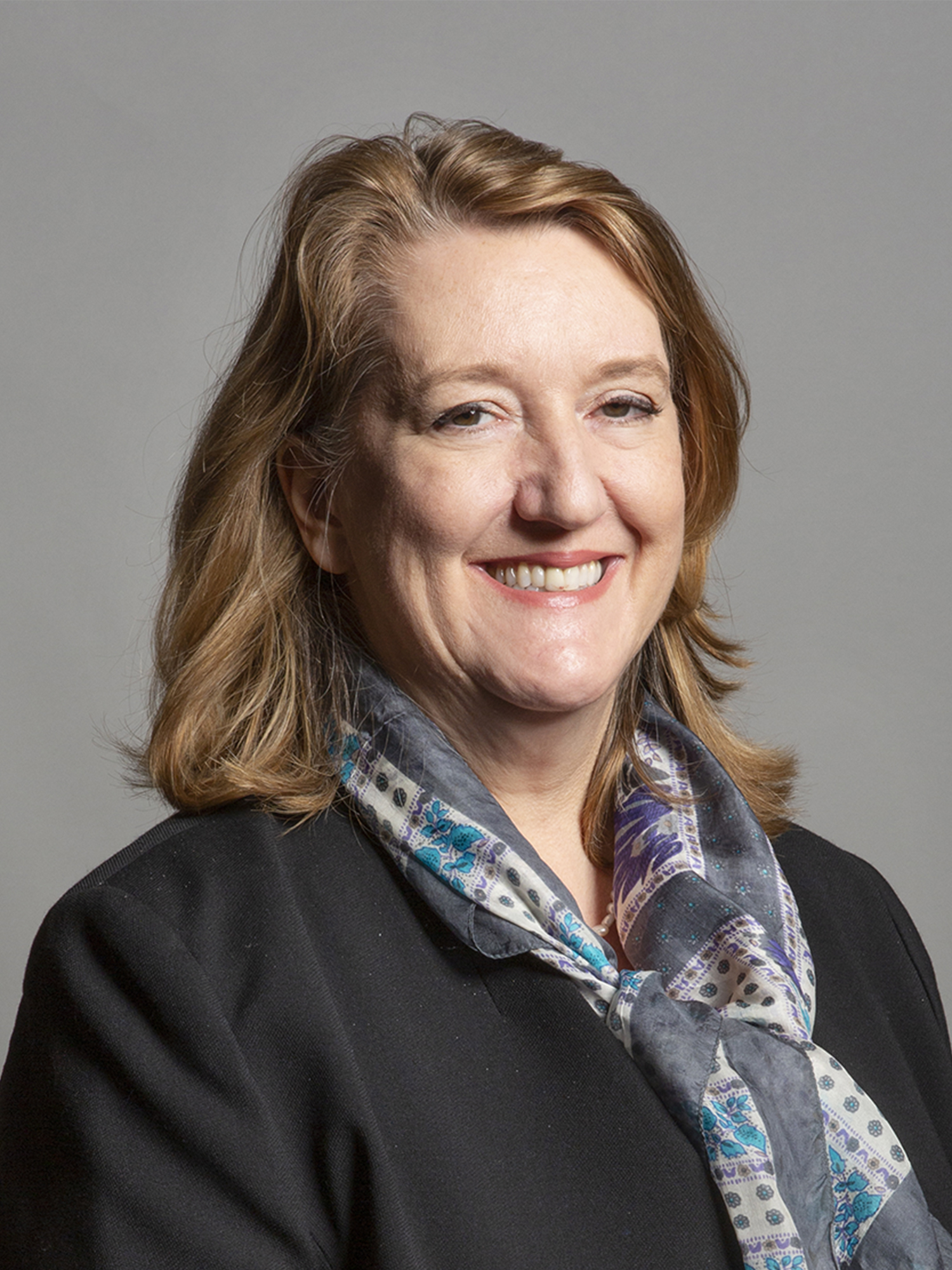
- Official portrait, 2019

Parliamentary Under-Secretary of State for Safeguarding
- In office 27 October 2022 – 13 November 2023
- Prime Minister: Rishi Sunak
- Preceded by: Mims Davies
- Succeeded by: Laura Farris

Lord Commissioner of the Treasury
- In office 20 September 2022 – 27 October 2022
- Prime Minister: Liz Truss
- Succeeded by: Steve Double

Parliamentary Under-Secretary of State for Justice and the Home Office
- In office 8 July 2022 – 20 September 2022
- Prime Minister: Boris Johnson
- Preceded by: James Cartlidge (Justice); The Lord Greenhalgh (Home Office)
- Succeeded by: Gareth Johnson

Assistant Government Whip
- In office 9 February 2022 – 8 July 2022
- Prime Minister: Boris Johnson

Parliamentary Private Secretary to the Prime Minister
- In office 17 September 2021 – 9 February 2022 Serving with Andrew Griffith
- Prime Minister: Boris Johnson
- Preceded by: Trudy Harrison; Alex Burghart
- Succeeded by: Joy Morrissey; Lia Nici; James Duddridge

Member of Parliament for Derbyshire Dales
- In office 12 December 2019 – 30 May 2024
- Preceded by: Patrick McLoughlin
- Succeeded by: John Whitby

Personal details
- Born: 27 May 1965 (age 61) Billericay, Essex, England
- Party: Conservative
- Education: Brunel University London
- Profession: Barrister
- Website: sarahdines.org.uk

Sarah Elizabeth Dines (born 27 May 1965) is a British Conservative Party politician who was Member of Parliament (MP) for Derbyshire Dales from 2019 to 2024. She served as Parliamentary Under-Secretary of State for Safeguarding from October 2022 to November 2023. She served as Lord Commissioner of the Treasury from September to October 2022.

== Early life and career ==
Sarah Dines was born on 27 May 1965 in Billericay, and raised in Basildon. Her parents, Elizabeth (née Dale) and Tony Dines, were tenant farmers until their tenancy was ended and their farm was taken from them to form part of what then became Basildon new town. Her mother served as a Conservative councillor on Basildon District Council and subsequently on Maldon Town Council, Maldon District Council and Essex County Council.

Dines attended Chalvedon comprehensive school and completed her A Levels at Basildon College. She studied at Brunel University from 1983 to 1987, and at the Inns of Court School of Law between 1987 and 1988. She is a member of Lincoln's Inn and was called to the Bar in July 1988.

She worked as a family law practitioner, latterly at 3 Paper Buildings, dealing with divorce, including financial and business assets, care, adoption, international child law and child abduction and related issues. She is a member of the Family Law Bar Association and the British Academy of Forensic Sciences.

== Parliamentary career ==
Dines stood as the Northern Ireland Conservatives candidate in Belfast East at the 1997 general election, coming fourth with 2.4% of the vote behind the incumbent DUP MP Peter Robinson, the UUP candidate Reg Empey, and the Alliance candidate Jim Hendron.

Dines was elected as Member of Parliament for Derbyshire Dales at the 2019 general election with 58.7% of the vote and a majority of 17,381. During the 2019 general election campaign she said that her priorities were to "get Brexit done", preserving the environment and better digital connectivity within the constituency. She declared herself to be "passionately committed to the countryside and the environment". She stated that "people need to vote blue to be green".

On 20 December 2019, she signed the Early Day Motion calling for Big Ben to chime on the day of Brexit. Dines is a member of the 'Vote Blue, Go Green' movement within the Conservative Party.

In February 2020, Dines raised the issue of funding for Ashbourne's long-awaited A515 bypass, stating: "For over 100 years, in one form or another, the Ashbourne bypass in Derbyshire Dales has been endlessly discussed, debated, consulted on and promised".

In March 2020, Dines was elected as a member of the Justice Select Committee. In June 2021, she was also appointed to serve on the Northern Ireland (Ministers, Elections and Petitions of Concern) Bill.

Dines spoke out in November 2020 on the "truly despicable online abuse" to which parliamentarians have been subjected, stating that "attacks on physical appearance, seems to be predominantly aimed at women MPs".

In December 2020, the Sunday Times published an article reporting that Dines had been claiming expenses for hotel accommodation located near to her parliamentary office despite owning six properties in total, worth approximately £5 million. The newspaper accused Dines of "charging the taxpayer thousands of pounds for regular stays at a four-star hotel". A spokesman for Dines responded, stating: "Sarah has conformed to all the necessary processes for declaring her interests. Any expense claims she has made have been in line with the instructions set out by the Independent Parliamentary Standards Authority. Sarah is a reluctant user of hotels and only stays in hotels in London when her parliamentary and departmental responsibilities have kept her working late at Westminster".

In March 2021, she was appointed to the ad hoc Select Committee on the Armed Forces Bill.

Also in March 2021, Dines was one of the Conservative MPs calling for the BBC to reconsider its decision not to play "Rule, Britannia!" and "Land of Hope and Glory" at the Last Night of the Proms, a decision that was ultimately reversed. She said: "I am proud to be British, as are my constituents. Anthems of our nation are poignant and mean so much more today, than a reference to the historical time they were written in. We should be proud of history and recognise and learn from any mistakes of the past".

On 17 September 2021, Dines was appointed Parliamentary Private Secretary to the Prime Minister Boris Johnson, alongside Andrew Griffith, in the second cabinet reshuffle of the second Johnson ministry. Her appointment was described by a senior Conservative Party MP as an 'absolutely disgraceful decision'.

In the February 2022 reshuffle, she was appointed as an Assistant Government Whip.

In April 2022, she repeatedly pressed Derbyshire Dales District Council to fulfil its statutory obligation to provide a traveller site within Derbyshire Dales: "To not have a permanent site, we are not only failing residents, but also the traveller community".

In May 2022, Dines said that some of the abuse she had received had to be dealt with by the police, and that in one case an online abuser admitted the crime of harassment and had accepted a police caution. She said: "There is a false belief that things that are said on social media, that people would never dream of saying to another in person are somehow different to real life harassment and abuse – it isn't. Harassment on social media and in real life are the same, they are awful, in some cases unlawful, and have no place in our society."

In July 2022, Dines was criticised for her handling of allegations involving the then Deputy Chief Whip, Chris Pincher. Dines, in her capacity as Assistant Government Whip, asked a man, who claimed Pincher groped him, if he was gay; when the alleged victim replied that he was gay, Dines was said to have replied "Well that doesn't make it straightforward". Responding to these claims, Dines said these press reports were inaccurate, and that: "The conversation I had with the subject of the alleged sexual harassment on the night was aimed at securing the full facts of what had transpired and was part of a much wider discussion which led to immediate action following the events of that evening".

In June 2023 Dines complained unsuccessfully to the press regulator IPSO about claims made in Matthew Parris's Notebook column in January 2023 that Boris Johnson wanted to stand for election in her own constituency of Derbyshire Dales.

On 7 August 2023, Dines appeared on BBC Radio 4's Today Programme speaking about the migrant crisis. She said that for "operational reasons" she could not give specific details about when the first asylum seekers would be boarding the refitted accommodation barge Bibby Stockholm but that it would be "pretty soon". Questioned further by Mishal Husain on whether Ascension Island was a potential alternative to Rwanda she said "You wouldn't expect me to go through those discussions, they're individual cases". Dines also said that those coming into Britain by unauthorised means "can't expect to stay in a four-star hotel". Dines appearance on Radio 4's Today programme was described as 'word salad nonsense' by Gavin Esler and Kevin Maguire said that Dines's answers suggested that 'she was scraped from the bottom of a barrel by Sunak".

Dines is a member of numerous All-Party Parliamentary Groups, including Policing and Security, Environment, Pacific Islands and Norfolk Island, Sovereign Defence Manufacturing Capability, Legal and Constitutional Affairs, Farming, Peak District, Trade and Export Promotion, Rural Business, Small and Micro Business, Caribbean, Commonwealth, Ireland and the Irish in Britain, Social Media, Women in Parliament and Endometriosis. She is a member of the British-Irish Parliamentary Assembly.

Dines has a particular interest in the Armed Forces and veterans and is a member of the Armed Forces, Armed Forces Covenant and Veterans All-Party Parliamentary Groups.

Dines is on the right of the Conservative Party and supported Liz Truss's election as leader. She is a supporter of the Blue Collar Conservatism group in Parliament, which exists to "champion working people".

== Personal life ==
Dines has four adult sons. Her husband is David Hoile, a public relations adviser. She owns six properties, including one in Whitechapel, London, and land, altogether worth an estimated £5 million, according to The Times.

Dines was taken ill with coronavirus in March 2020. She said: "I have to say, there were a lot of people worse off than me. I had it moderately, and it was very, very unpleasant and quite frightening."

Parliament of the United Kingdom
Preceded by Patrick McLoughlin	Member of Parliament for Derbyshire Dales; 2019–2024	Succeeded by John Whitby
Political offices
Preceded by Trudy Harrison; Alex Burghart	Parliamentary Private Secretary to the Prime Minister; 2021–2022; With: Andrew Griffith (2021–2022); Joy Morrissey (2022); Lia Nici (2022); James Duddridge (2022)	Succeeded by Alexander Stafford
