= John Whitby =

British politician

Cllr John Whitby MP
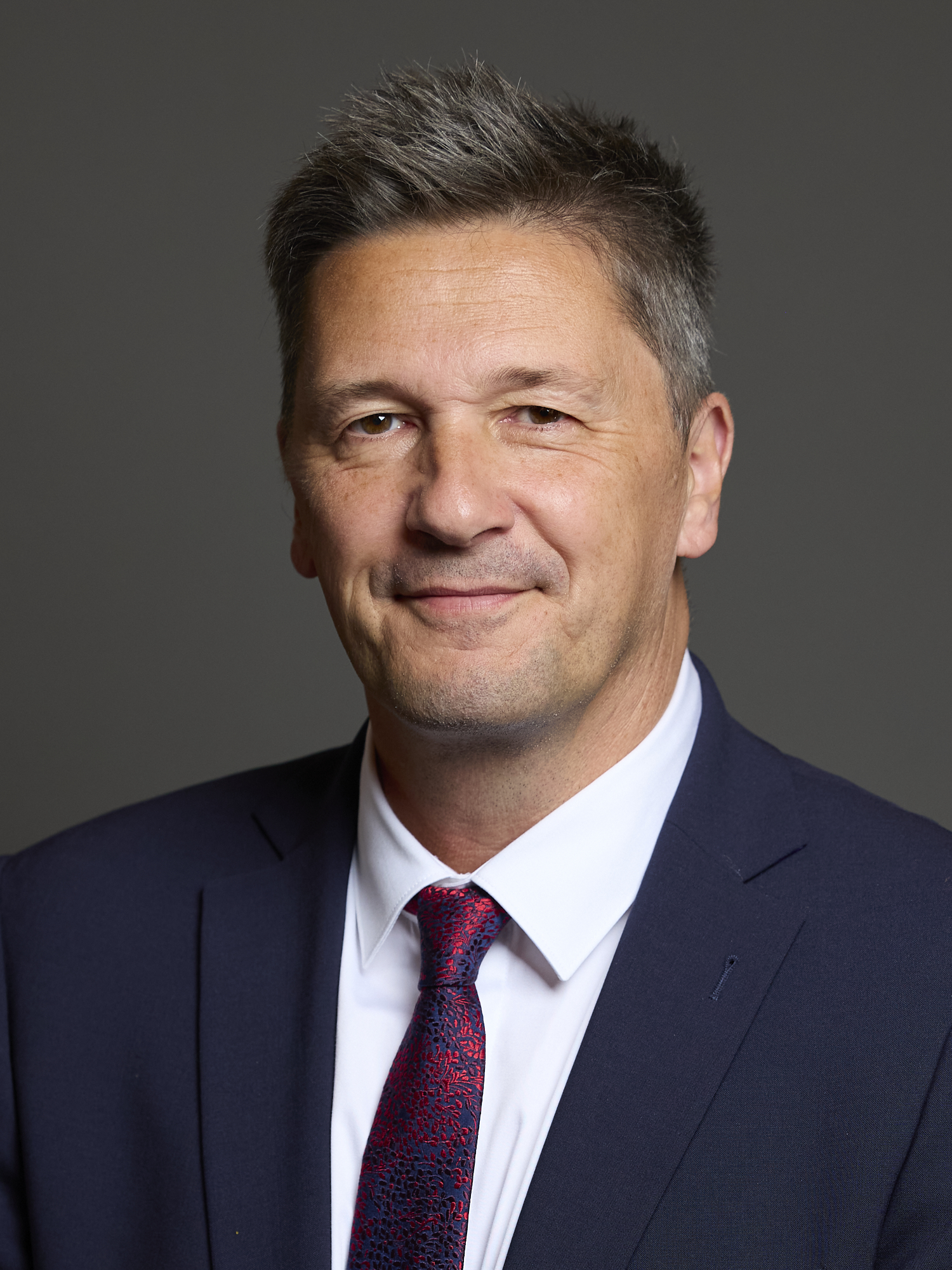
- Official portrait, 2024

Member of Parliament for Derbyshire Dales
- Incumbent
- Assumed office 4 July 2024
- Preceded by: Sarah Dines
- Majority: 350 (0.6%)

Member of Derby City Council for Mackworth and New Zealand Mackworth (2010–2023)
- Incumbent
- Assumed office 5 May 2022
- Preceded by: Adrian Pegg
- In office 5 May 2010 – 3 May 2018
- Preceded by: Raymond Baxter
- Succeeded by: Adrian Pegg

Personal details
- Born: John Michael Whitby Derbyshire, England
- Party: Labour
- Education: Open University (BA)
- Musical career
- Genres: Progressive metal Alternative metal
- Occupations: Singer
- Years active: 1988–1998
- Formerly of: The Beyond

John Michael Whitby is a British Labour Party politician who has served as Member of Parliament for Derbyshire Dales since 2024. A former musician, he was the lead singer of The Beyond in the 1980s and 1990s.

== Early life ==
Whitby was born in Derbyshire and educated at Woodlands Secondary Modern. He received a Bachelor Arts degree in Social Science and Politics from the Open University. At 21 he was living in Allestree, and was working on an Enterprise Allowance Scheme in Derby.

== Musical career ==
Whitby was the lead singer in the Derby progressive rock band The Beyond. The band was described as a fusion of funk and metal. He was recruited by the band's founders, guitarist Andy Gatford and drummer Neil Cooper, with whom he had been school friends. After that band ended he, along with many of his band mates, formed the band Gorilla. In 2018, while Whitby was a mayor, the band played a reunion gig, raising thousands for charity.

== Political career ==
After music Whitby joined the civil service. He became a councillor on Derby City Council in the early 2010s. In May 2017 he was made Mayor of Derby, a position which is held for a year, during which he raised £64,000 for charity. Despite it being noted that he was popular, even with opposition parties, he lost his seat just before the end of his term. He regained a seat on Derby council in the 2022 elections.

In the 2024 general election, he stood for the Derbyshire Dales constituency. He gained the seat from Sarah Dines, a member of the Conservative Party, with a majority of 350. As an MP he supported calls for measures to restrict holiday lets in the constituency, to tackle the local housing crisis.

== Personal life ==
He is a foster carer.

Parliament of the United Kingdom
Preceded by Sarah Dines	Member of Parliament for Derbyshire Dales; 2024–present	Incumbent
