= Derbyshire Dales (constituency) =

UK Parliament constituency (since 2010)

Coordinates: 53.15°N 1.65°W

- County constituency for the House of Commons
- Interactive map of boundaries from 2024
- Location within the East Midlands
- County: Derbyshire
- Electorate: 71,435 (March 2020)
- Major settlements: Ashbourne, Bakewell, Matlock, Darley Dale, Wirksworth

Current constituency
- Created: 2010
- Member of Parliament: John Whitby (Labour)
- Seats: One
- Created from: West Derbyshire

Derbyshire Dales (/ˈdɑːrbiʃɪər, -ʃər, deɪlz/ DAR-bee-sheer, -shər) is a constituency (Note: A county constituency (for the purposes of election expenses and type of returning officer)) that has been represented in the House of Commons of the UK Parliament since 2024 by John Whitby of the Labour Party. (Note: As with all constituencies, the constituency elects one Member of Parliament (MP) by the first past the post system of election at least every five years.) The constituency was created for the 2010 general election, largely replacing the West Derbyshire seat.

== Constituency profile ==
Derbyshire Dales is a large, rural constituency located in Derbyshire which mostly falls within the Peak District National Park. The largest town in the constituency is Matlock, which has a population of around 12,000 and serves as the county town. Other settlements in the constituency include the small towns of Ashbourne, Bakewell, Wirksworth and Darley Dale and the large village of Hilton. The area is popular with tourists, especially in Bakewell and the spa resort of Matlock Bath. The constituency is generally affluent, particularly so in Bakewell and Hilton.

On average, residents of the constituency are older and more religious than the rest of the country. Household income is high, and residents are more likely to be degree-educated and work in professional occupations. At the 2021 census, White people made up 97% of the population. Local politics (district and county) are mixed; Matlock is represented by Liberal Democrat councillors, the south of the constituency around Ashbourne elected Conservatives, Wirksworth has Labour Party representatives and Greens were elected in the more rural north. The Ashbourne and Hilton areas also have Reform UK representation at the county council. An estimated 52% of voters in the constituency supported leaving the European Union in the 2016 referendum, identical to the nationwide figure.

== History ==
Following their review of parliamentary representation in Derbyshire, the Boundary Commission for England created a new constituency of Derbyshire Dales which is almost coterminous with the previous seat of West Derbyshire. At the first four elections of its existence, it elected Conservative MPs by safe margins, with the fifth such election seeing Labour gain the seat for the first time since 1945.

== Boundaries ==
=== 2010–2024 ===
The District of Derbyshire Dales, and the Borough of Amber Valley wards of Alport, Crich and South West Parishes.

=== Current ===
Following the 2023 review of Westminster constituencies, which came into effect for the 2024 general election, the composition of the constituency is as follows (as they existed on 1 December 2020):

- the Borough of Amber Valley wards of Alport and Crich^{1} (South West Parishes ward transferred to Mid Derbyshire)
- the District of Derbyshire Dales
- the District of South Derbyshire wards of Hilton and Hatton (transferred from South Derbyshire)

^{1} Further to a local government boundary review which came into effect in May 2023, the area in the Borough of Amber Valley comprises parts of the wards of Alport & South West Parishes and Crich & South Wingfield.

== Members of Parliament ==
West Derbyshire prior to 2010

| Election | Member | Party |
|---|---|---|
| 2010 | Sir Patrick McLoughlin | Conservative |
| 2019 | Sarah Dines | Conservative |
| 2024 | John Whitby | Labour |

== Elections ==
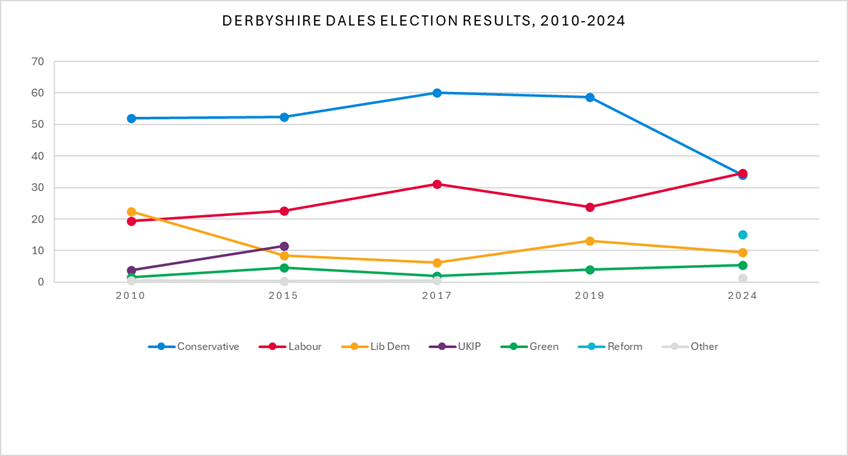
Derbyshire Dales election results 1983–2024

=== Elections in the 2020s ===
General election 2024: Derbyshire Dales
| Party | Candidate | Votes | % | ±% |
|---|---|---|---|---|
| Labour | John Whitby | 17,759 | 34.6 | +10.5 |
| Conservative | Sarah Dines | 17,409 | 34.0 | −25.0 |
| Reform | Edward Oakenfull (Note: After nominations for the 2024 general election closed, Reform UK withdrew support for Edward Oakenfull on the 29 June, after reports of "offensive or racist comments") | 7,728 | 15.1 | New |
| Liberal Democrats | Robert Court | 4,860 | 9.5 | −3.3 |
| Green | Kelda Boothroyd | 2,830 | 5.5 | +1.4 |
| Independent | Rachel Elnaugh-Love | 369 | 0.7 | New |
| True and Fair Party | Helen Wetherall | 317 | 0.6 | New |
| Majority | | 350 | 0.6 | |
| Turnout | | 51,272 | 69.9 | −5.6 |
| Registered electors | | 73,317 | | |
| Labour gain from Conservative | | Swing | +17.7 | |

=== Elections in the 2010s ===
General election 2019: Derbyshire Dales
| Party | Candidate | Votes | % | ±% |
|---|---|---|---|---|
| Conservative | Sarah Dines | 29,356 | 58.7 | −1.3 |
| Labour | Claire Raw | 11,975 | 23.9 | −7.2 |
| Liberal Democrats | Robert Court | 6,627 | 13.2 | +6.9 |
| Green | Matthew Buckler | 2,058 | 4.1 | +2.1 |
| Majority | | 17,381 | 34.8 | +5.9 |
| Turnout | | 50,016 | 77.9 | +0.9 |
| Conservative hold | | Swing | +2.9 | |

General election 2017: Derbyshire Dales
| Party | Candidate | Votes | % | ±% |
|---|---|---|---|---|
| Conservative | Patrick McLoughlin | 29,744 | 60.0 | +7.6 |
| Labour | Andy Botham | 15,417 | 31.1 | +8.4 |
| Liberal Democrats | Andrew Hollyer | 3,126 | 6.3 | −2.1 |
| Green | Matthew Buckler | 1,002 | 2.0 | −2.6 |
| Humanity | Robin Greenwood | 282 | 0.6 | +0.3 |
| Majority | | 14,327 | 28.9 | −0.8 |
| Turnout | | 49,571 | 77.0 | +2.4 |
| Conservative hold | | Swing | −0.4 | |

General election 2015: Derbyshire Dales
| Party | Candidate | Votes | % | ±% |
|---|---|---|---|---|
| Conservative | Patrick McLoughlin | 24,805 | 52.4 | +0.3 |
| Labour | Andy Botham | 10,761 | 22.7 | +3.3 |
| UKIP | John Young | 5,508 | 11.6 | +7.8 |
| Liberal Democrats | Ben Fearn | 3,965 | 8.4 | −14.1 |
| Green | Ian Wood | 2,173 | 4.6 | +2.9 |
| Humanity | Amila Y'Mech | 149 | 0.3 | +0.2 |
| Majority | | 14,044 | 29.7 | +0.1 |
| Turnout | | 47,361 | 74.6 | +0.8 |
| Conservative hold | | Swing | −1.6 | |

General election 2010: Derbyshire Dales
| Party | Candidate | Votes | % | ±% |
|---|---|---|---|---|
| Conservative | Patrick McLoughlin | 24,378 | 52.1 | +5.6 |
| Liberal Democrats | Joe Naitta | 10,512 | 22.5 | −1.9 |
| Labour | Colin Swindell | 9,061 | 19.4 | −6.3 |
| UKIP | Ian Guiver | 1,779 | 3.8 | +1.3 |
| Green | Josh Stockell | 772 | 1.7 | New |
| Monster Raving Loony | Nick The Flying Brick | 228 | 0.5 | New |
| Humanity | Amila Y'Mech | 50 | 0.1 | New |
| Majority | | 13,866 | 29.6 | |
| Turnout | | 46,780 | 73.8 | +6.3 |
| Conservative hold | | Swing | +3.7 | |

== See also ==
- List of parliamentary constituencies in Derbyshire
