= Baggy Shanker =

British politician

Baggy Shanker MP
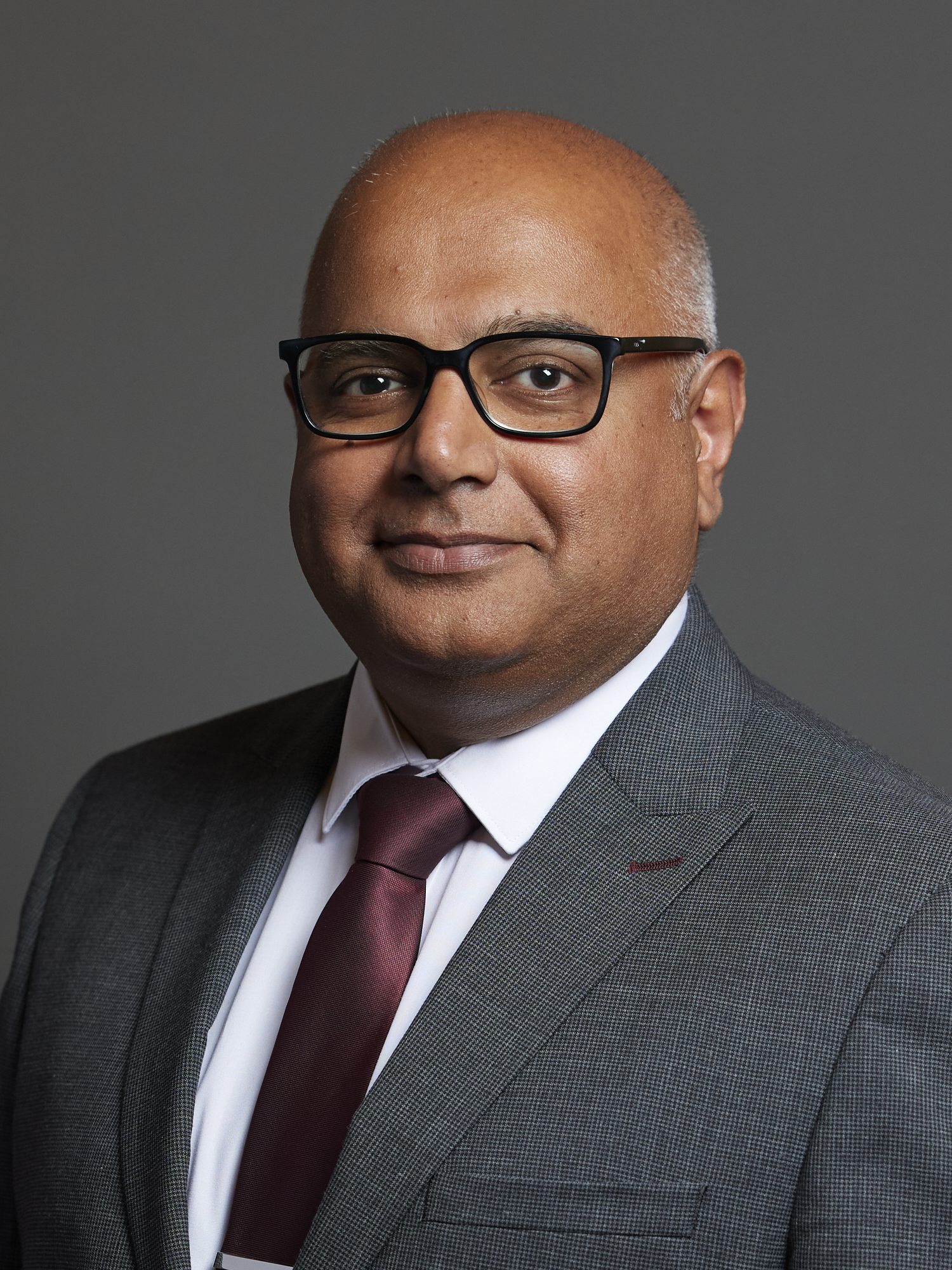
- Official portrait, 2024

Member of Parliament for Derby South
- Incumbent
- Assumed office 4 July 2024
- Preceded by: Margaret Beckett
- Majority: 6,002 (16.1%)

Leader of the Derby City Council
- In office 24 May 2023 – 18 June 2024
- Preceded by: Chris Poulter
- Succeeded by: Nadine Peatfield

Personal details
- Born: Arboretum, Derbyshire, England
- Party: Labour and Co-operative

Bhagat Singh Shanker, known as Baggy Shanker, is a British Labour and Co-operative Party politician who has been Member of Parliament for Derby South since 2024.

He was elected leader of Derby City Council in 2023, making him the first Sikh council leader in Derby. He was removed from that position in June 2024 after losing a motion of no confidence.

Shanker previously worked as a project manager at Rolls-Royce's Civil Aerospace Division, and for the chemicals company Celanese.

Parliament of the United Kingdom
Preceded by Margaret Beckett	Member of Parliament for Derby South; 2024–present	Incumbent
