= The Beyond (band) =

British metal band

- Also known as: Gorilla
- Origin: Derby, Derbyshire, England
- Genres: Progressive metal, alternative metal
- Years active: 1988–1998, 2012, 2018
- Labels: EMI, Big Cat, Harvest, Music For Nations, Embryo, Disinformation, Viper
- Past members: Paul Fallon (bass); John Whitby (vocals); Andy Gatford (guitars); Neil Cooper (drums); Jim Kersey (bass); David Petty (bass); Andy Lingard (violin)

The Beyond were an English progressive metal band from Derby, formed in 1988. The band performed under this name between 1988 and 1993, and then under the name Gorilla from 1995 to 1998.

== History ==
=== The Beyond (1988–1993) ===
The Beyond formed in their home town of Derby in mid-1988 around the nucleus of Andy Gatford (guitars) and Neil Cooper (drums), who had played together since the age of 15. They were joined by schoolmate John Whitby (vocals) and Paul Fallon (bass). Soon, Fallon was replaced on bass by Jim Kersey.

=== Crawl ===
The Beyond signed a publishing deal with Island Music and a development deal with EMI. Conscious of the inestimable value of grassroots development, The Beyond passed on major options the first time out, releasing the Manic Sound Panic EP on UK record label Big Cat. An impressive agenda of live work ensued including support slots with the Red Hot Chili Peppers, Soundgarden, Claytown Troupe, Acid Reign, and Xentrix. Their first album, Crawl, was released in April 1991, on the EMI subsidiary label Harvest and includes the singles One Step Too Far (number 97 on the singles chats), Empire, and The Raging E.P. which took the band into the UK Top 75. Crawl was produced by Barry Clempson (Depeche Mode, The The). Following its release, more touring ensued, this time including a full European tour with Living Colour.

A unique arrangement between EMI and the US-based independent company Continuum withdrew The Beyond from their contract with EMI USA in order to develop the band through a more appropriate and streetwise independent avenue. The following year, Crawl was released in the US on the Continuum label with a revised track listing ('Second Sight' was replaced by former UK b-sides 'Nail' and 'Everybody Wins'), followed subsequently by a European support slot to Canadian band Rush.

=== Chasm ===
During time spent in the US, while Crawl was receiving rave reviews, The Beyond met Jim 'Foetus' Thirlwell and decided he should produce their second album titled 'Chasm'. Once again, The Beyond decided to go the independent route. A deal between EMI UK and Music For Nations saw Music For Nations marketing and distributing Chasm in Europe. The J. G. Thirlwell-produced Chasm was released on the 13th of April 1993.

=== Gorilla (1995–1998) ===
By 1994, The Beyond had gone into hiatus. Drummer Neil Cooper made up the original line up of noise-rockers Cable, but left to rejoin Whitby and Gatford on a new project, Gorilla.

Gorilla (completed by David Petty on bass and Andy Lingard on violin) released their first Demo which consisted of 3 tracks, 'Dream on', 'Ripe' (although in some versions this track was called 'Urban Pygmy') and 'Ping'. Followed shortly after by their first EP 'Extended Play' in 1995 on the Embryo label followed by 'The Shutdown EP' on the Disinformation label. Again, the band had further streamlined their sound, heavier than before, but with less complexity in the playing, allowing John Whitby's infectious hooks to stand out. In 1997 and 1998, Gorilla released the 'Who Wants to Save the World Anyway?', and 'Outside' singles. These proved to be their last singles. Andy Lingard left the band and Gorilla briefly continued as a four-piece before disbanding.

=== Recent history ===
In February 2018, the 1990–94 lineup of The Beyond performed a charity gig at The Venue on Abbey Street. The event raised more than £5,000 for Derbyshire Children's Holiday Centre, Children First, Safe and Sound, the British Red Cross and the Derby Museums Trust.

== Discography ==
as The Beyond

Demos

Year	Title	Label	Track list
1988	The Beyond (HFF1)	None (cassette)	1. L. of D.; 2. Red Sea; 3. The Firm; 4. Get Back; 5. Highway to Hell
1989	No Excuse (As Beyond (No The))	None (cassette)	1. The Eve Of My Release; 2. Worlds Apart

Singles / E.P.s

Year	Title	Label	Track list
1990	Manic Sound Panic (12" vinyl only)	Big Cat	1. Eve of My Release; 2. Portrait; 3. Red Sea; 4. Lead the Blind
1990	No Excuse	Big Cat	1. No Excuse; 2. Portrait (Live); 3. California über alles (Live)
1991	One Step Too Far	EMI	1. One Step Too Far; 2. Break on Through (To the Other Side); 3. Touch Me I'm Sick
1991	Empire	EMI	1. Empire; 2. Everybody Wins; 3. One Step Too Far (Brain Surgery Mix)
1991	Raging E.P.	Harvest Records	1. Great Indifference (Screwdriver Version); 2. Nail; 3. Empire (Live); 4. Eve of My Release (Demo)

Albums

Year	Title	Label	Track list
1991	Crawl	Harvest Records	1. Sacred Garden; 2. Empire; 3. Sick; 4. Day Before Tomorrow; 5. One Step Too Far; 6. Second Sight; 7. Great Indifference; 8. The Eve of My Release; 9. No More Happy Ever Afters; 10. Lead the Blind; 11. Dominoes
1992	Crawl (U.S. release)	Continuum	1. Sacred Garden; 2. Great Indifference (Screwdriver Version); 3. No More Happy Ever Afters; 4. Everybody Wins; 5. Nail; 6. Day Before Tomorrow; 7. One Step Too Far; 8. The Eve of My Release; 9. Empire; 10. Sick; 11. Lead the Blind; 12. Dominoes
1993	Chasm	Music For Nations	1. Cypress Era; 2. Stagnant; 3. Melt; 4. Sentimental Vultures; 5. Matter Metropolis; 6. Sweat Tastes Sweeter; 7. Onion; 8. Grey; 9. Vive La Republique; 10. Mother my Lover

as Gorilla

Demos

Year	Title	Label	Track list
1995	Untitled	None (cassette)	1. Dream On; 2. Ripe (A.K.A Urban Pygmy); 3. Ping

Singles / E.P.s

Year	Title	Label	Track list
1995	Extended Play	Embryo	1. Acid Test; 2. Diesel; 3. Five Year Plan; 4. Jaws
1995	Shutdown E.P.	Disinformation	1. Bulldozer; 2. More Flesh to the Pound; 3. When This Fails; 4. Disco Dancer
1997	Who Wants to Save the World Anyway?	Viper	1. Who Wants to Save the World Anyway?; 2. 98 Grand; 3. Glassed
1998	Outside	Viper	1. Outside; 2. Now the Working Man Has Found Us Out; 3. Let You Down
1999	Gorilla E.P.	Unreleased	1. Outside; 2. Heat; 3. Let You Down; 4. I Know Where You've Been; 5. Super Star; 6. Americana
