= Ndukwe Onuoha =

Nigerian-born poet and politician

- Born: March 5, 1982 (age 44)
- Education: Abia State University
- Occupations: Poet, Politician
- Writing career
- Notable work: Nwa Chukwu

Ndukwe Onuoha is a Nigerian-born British poet and politician. He made history as the first African councilor on the Derby City council.

== Early life ==
Ndukwe Onuoha was born on March 5, 1982, in Aba, Abia State, Nigeria and hails from Abiriba in Abia State. He studied History and International Relations at Abia State University.

== Career Background ==
Ndukwe worked in advertising, serving as Creative Director for 7even Interactive, a Nigerian advertising agency. He has also gained mild prominence as a spoken word poet, performing a stage adaptation of his album 'Nwa Chukwu' at the 2019 Lagos Fringe Festival.

== Political career ==
After moving to the UK in 2021, Ndukwe settled in Derby and became active in local politics. In May 2023, he was elected as the first African councilor in Derby, United Kingdom representing Mackworth and New Zealand ward and running on the Labour Party ticket. Known for promoting cultural understanding and integration between the Igbo community and the wider population in the United Kingdom, Ndukwe came under fire for referring to Conservative councillor Gaurav Pandey as a "token candidate" during a debate about diversity within Derby City Council. He later apologized for his comments. In July 2024, Ndukwe was appointed as the new cabinet member for Streetpride, Public Safety & Leisure in Derby City Council in July 2024.
