= Reform Derby =

- Leader: Alan Graves
- Founded: 18 March 2020
- Dissolved: 5 August 2026
- Headquarters: 4 Lady Mantle Close, Chellaston, Derby, DE73 5PY
- Ideology: Localism; Right-wing populism
- Political position: Right-wing to far-right
- National affiliation: Reform UK
- Colours: Dark Blue; Gold

Website
- reformderby.uk

Reform Derby was a British political party based in Derby, Derbyshire. It was founded in 2020 by a group of five Brexit Party councillors on Derby City Council. Although it served as the local affiliate of Reform UK, it was a separate entity.

The party was voluntarily de-registered in August 2026.

== History ==
=== 2023 elections ===
In the lead up to the 2023 Derby City Council election one of the party's 51 candidates Russell Armstrong gave an interview to Derby News outlining party positions. Armstrong claimed that the Derby city council was not operating within "common sense" for supporting high density housing projects in city's downtown despite the development being an entirely private venture as well as praising that there was no local Reform whip, meaning each elected Reform Derby member is free to express their own opinions and vote their conscience. Derby News, however, criticized the party's 2023 "contract" for not being a typical manifesto, and for largely overlapping with the 2018 UKIP manifesto and for including a statement criticizing that housing was "now unavailable to Derby born residents" which Armstrong denied, as he wasn't born in Derby, as well as refusing to differentiate illegal immigrants and asylum seekers. Derby News claimed that Reform Derby advocating for "Derby Born" residents constituted "hate speech."

In the election the party elected six councillors:

- Alan Graves
- John Evans
- Kirk Kus
- Alan Lindsey
- Stephen Fowke
- Timothy Prosser

Its candidates were the only Reform councillors to be elected in the entire country in that years local elections.

In May 2023, the party's leader, Alan Graves, was elected by councillors as Mayor of Derby, beating the Labour Party candidate by 1 vote. That party's councillors, 23 of the total of 51, walked out of the council chamber in protest.
