= Derby City Council =

English local government authority

Type
- Type: Unitary authority of Derby

Leadership
- Mayor: Jonathan Smale, Conservative since 20 May 2026
- Leader: Nadine Peatfield, Labour since 18 June 2024
- Chief Executive: Sam Dennis since April 2026

Structure
- Seats: 51 councillors
- Graph of the party split among 51 seats.
- Political groups: Administration (24) Labour (24) Other parties (27) Conservative (14) Reform (6) Liberal Democrats (3) Independent (4)

Elections
- Voting system: First past the post
- Last election: 4 May 2023
- Next election: 6 May 2027

Motto
- Industria, Virtus, et Fortitudo; Translation: Diligence, Courage, Strength

Meeting place
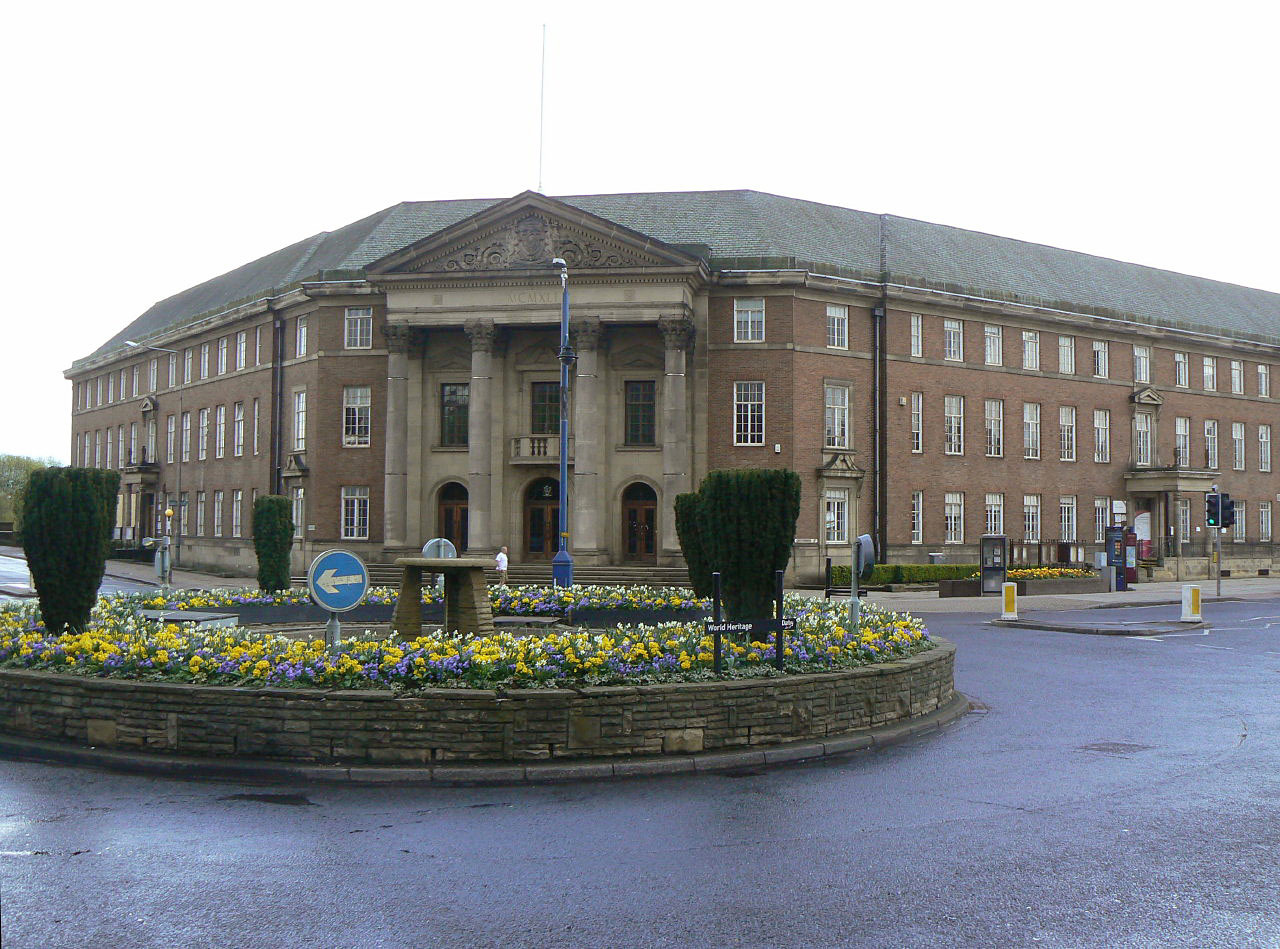
- Council House, Corporation Street, Derby, DE1 2FS

Website
- www.derby.gov.uk

Derby City Council is the local authority for the city of Derby, in the ceremonial county of Derbyshire in the East Midlands region of England. Derby has had a council from medieval times, which has been reformed on numerous occasions. Since 1997 the council has been a unitary authority, being a district council which also performs the functions of a county council. Since 2024 the council has been a member of the East Midlands Combined County Authority.

The council has been under no overall control since 2018. Following the 2023 election a minority Labour administration formed to run the council. The council is based at the Council House.

== History ==
The town of Derby had been an ancient borough, with borough charters dating back to 1154. It was reformed to become a municipal borough in 1836 under the Municipal Corporations Act 1835, governed by a corporate body called "the mayor, aldermen and burgesses of the borough of Derby", generally known as the corporation or town council. When elected county councils were established in 1889 under the Local Government Act 1888, Derby was considered large enough for its existing council to provide county-level services and so it was made a county borough, independent from Derbyshire County Council.

In 1974 Derby was reconstituted as a non-metropolitan district under the Local Government Act 1972; it kept the same boundaries but became a lower-tier district council with Derbyshire County Council providing county-level services to the town for the first time. Derby retained its borough status, allowing the chair of the council to take the title of mayor, continuing Derby's series of mayors dating back to 1638. The borough of Derby was awarded city status on 7 June 1977, allowing the council to change its name to Derby City Council.

In 1997, Derby City Council regained responsibility for county-level services from Derbyshire County Council. The way this change was implemented was to create a new non-metropolitan county of Derby covering the same area as the existing district, but with no separate county council; instead the existing city council took on county functions, making it a unitary authority. This therefore had the effect of restoring the city council to the powers it had held when Derby was a county borough prior to 1974. Despite having been removed from the non-metropolitan county of Derbyshire (the area administered by Derbyshire County Council), the city remains part of the wider ceremonial county of Derbyshire for the purposes of lieutenancy.

In 2024 a combined authority was established covering Derby, Derbyshire, Nottingham and Nottinghamshire, called the East Midlands Combined County Authority. The combined authority is chaired by the directly elected Mayor of the East Midlands and oversees the delivery of certain strategic functions across the area.

== Governance ==
Derby City Council provides all local government services in the area. As a unitary authority it provides both county-level and district-level services. There are no civil parishes in Derby, which is an unparished area.

=== Political control ===
The council has been under no overall control since 2018. The council has been run by a Labour minority administration since the 2023 election.

Political control of the council since the 1974 reforms took effect has been as follows:

Non-metropolitan district

Party in control	Years
Labour	1974–1976
Conservative	1976–1979
Labour	1979–1988
Conservative	1988–1991
No overall control	1991–1994
Labour	1994–1997

Unitary authority

Party in control	Years
Labour	1997–2003
No overall control	2003–2005
Labour	2005–2006
No overall control	2006–2012
Labour	2012–2018
No overall control	2018–present

=== Leadership ===
The role of Mayor of Derby is largely ceremonial. Political leadership is instead provided by the leader of the council. The leaders since 1974 have been:

Councillor	Party	From	To
Walter Watson	Labour	1 Apr 1974	Oct 1974
Mick Walker	Labour	Oct 1974	May 1986
Bob Laxton	Labour	May 1986	May 1988
Jeffery Tillett	Conservative	May 1988	1989
Nick Brown	Conservative	1989	Mar 1994
Bob Laxton	Labour	Mar 1994	May 1997
Robert Jones	Labour	May 1997	2002
Chris Williamson	Labour	2002	May 2003
Maurice Burgess	Liberal Democrats	21 May 2003	Jul 2005
Chris Williamson	Labour	20 Jul 2005	21 May 2008
Hilary Jones	Liberal Democrats	21 May 2008	26 May 2010
Harvey Jennings	Conservative	26 May 2010	25 May 2011
Philip Hickson	Conservative	25 May 2011	May 2012
Paul Bayliss	Labour	23 May 2012	May 2014
Ranjit Banwait	Labour	11 Jun 2014	May 2018
Chris Poulter	Conservative	23 May 2018	May 2023
Baggy Shanker	Labour	24 May 2023	18 June 2024
Nadine Peatfield	Labour	18 June 2024	

=== Composition ===
Following the 2023 election, and subsequent changes of allegiance up to September 2026, the composition of the council was:

Party	Seats
Labour	24
Conservative	14
Reform Derby	6
Liberal Democrats	3
Independent	4
Total	51

Reform Derby is an independently registered party serving as a local affiliate of Reform UK. The next election is due in 2027.

== Premises ==
The council is based at the Council House on Corporation Street, which was purpose-built for the council. Construction began in 1938 but was interrupted by the Second World War, with the building eventually being completed in 1949.

== Elections ==
Since the last boundary changes in 2023 the council has comprised 51 councillors, representing 18 wards, with each ward electing two or three councillors. Elections are held every four years.

== Arms ==
Coat of arms of Derby City Council
Notes Granted 12 May 1939 Crest On a wreath of the colours a ram passant Proper collared Or between two sprigs of broom also Proper. Escutcheon Argent on a mount Vert within park palings a buck lodged between two oak trees fructed Proper. Supporters On either side a buck charged on the shoulder with a sprig of broom Proper. Motto Industria Virtus Et Fortitudo (Diligence Courage And Strength)
