= 1998 Derby City Council election =

1998 UK local government election

← 1996	7 May 1998	1999 →

14 of the 44 seats in the Derby City Council 23 seats needed for a majority
	First party	Second party	Third party
Party	Labour	Conservative	Liberal Democrats
Last election	39	3	2
Seats won	37	4	3
Seat change	▼2	▲1	▲1
Popular vote	16,936	11,821	5,548
Percentage	48.8%	34.1%	16.0%
- Map showing the results of the 1998 Derby City Council elections.
Council control before election
Labour
Council control after election
Labour

The 1998 Derby City Council election took place on 7 May 1998 to elect members of Derby City Council in England. One third of the council was up for election and the Labour party kept overall control of the council.

One of the two Labour councillors defeated in the election was Milton Crosdale, the father of Imaani, who was taking part in the Eurovision Song Contest for the United Kingdom two days after the election. Crosdale had been defending a three-vote majority in Blagreaves ward.

After the election, the composition of the council was

- Labour 37
- Conservative 4
- Liberal Democrat 3

== Election result ==
Derby local election result 1998
Party	Seats	Gains	Losses	Net gain/loss	Seats %	Votes %	Votes	+/−
Labour	10	0	2	▼2	71.4	48.8	16,936	
Conservative	3	1	0	▲1	21.4	34.1	11,821	
Liberal Democrats	1	1	0	▲1	7.1	16.0	5,548	
National Democrats	0	0	0	Steady	0.0	0.4	125	
Green	0	0	0	Steady	0.0	0.4	123	
Independent	0	0	0	Steady	0.0	0.3	121	

== Ward results ==
=== Abbey ===
Location of Abbey ward

Abbey
Party	Candidate	Votes	%
Labour	J. Till	1,191	67.3%
Conservative	D. Sice	365	20.6%
Liberal Democrats	B. Harry	215	12.1%
Turnout			15.4%
Labour hold			

=== Allestree ===
Location of Allestree ward

Allestree
Party	Candidate	Votes	%
Conservative	R. Webb	1,666	63.2%
Labour	M. Musih-Ud Daullah	601	22.8%
Liberal Democrats	S. Kirkman King	368	14.0%
Turnout			32.7%
Conservative hold			

=== Alvaston ===
Location of Alvaston ward

Alvaston
Party	Candidate	Votes	%
Labour	N. Wawman	1,077	61.3%
Conservative	P. Willitts	427	24.3%
Liberal Democrats	T. Hall	171	9.7%
National Democrats	G. Hardy	81	4.6%
Turnout			22.8%
Labour hold			

=== Babington ===
Location of Babington ward

Babington
Party	Candidate	Votes	%
Labour	V. Wilsoncroft	903	52.5%
Conservative	M. Yaqub	595	34.6%
Liberal Democrats	A. Savage	223	13.0%
Turnout			23.3%
Labour hold			

=== Blagreaves ===
Location of Blagreaves ward

Blagreaves
Party	Candidate	Votes	%
Liberal Democrats	R. Skelton	2,409	58.4%
Labour	M. Crosdale	1,314	31.8%
Conservative	J. Lee	361	8.7%
National Democrats	K. Sharp	44	1.1%
Turnout			45.2%
Liberal Democrats gain from Labour			

=== Boulton ===
Location of Boulton ward

Boulton
Party	Candidate	Votes	%
Labour	Hardyal Dhindsa	1,190	56.5%
Conservative	J. Slater	683	32.4%
Liberal Democrats	R. Charlesworth	234	11.1%
Turnout			25.1%
Labour hold			

=== Breadsall ===
Location of Breadsall ward

Breadsall
Party	Candidate	Votes	%
Labour	J. Ireland	1,807	51.3%
Conservative	M. Webb	1,363	38.7%
Liberal Democrats	E. Ashburner	349	9.9%
Turnout			22.4%
Labour hold			

=== Chaddesden ===
Location of Chaddesden ward

Chaddesden
Party	Candidate	Votes	%
Labour	M. Repton	1,323	60.1%
Conservative	J. Veitch	600	27.3%
Liberal Democrats	P. Whitaker	156	7.1%
Independent	L. Alcock	121	5.5%
Turnout			27.0%
Labour hold			

=== Chellaston ===
Location of Chellaston ward

Chellaston
Party	Candidate	Votes	%
Labour	B. Jackson	1,492	51.4%
Conservative	D. Black	1,209	41.7%
Liberal Democrats	B. Lowe	199	6.9%
Turnout			29.4%
Labour hold			

=== Darley ===
Location of Darley ward

Darley
Party	Candidate	Votes	%
Conservative	P. Latham	1,647	48.5%
Labour	D. Roberts	1,375	40.5%
Liberal Democrats	J-P. Keane	377	11.1%
Turnout			36.1%
Conservative gain from Labour			

=== Derwent ===
Location of Derwent ward

Derwent
Party	Candidate	Votes	%
Labour	M. Young	1,067	70.2%
Conservative	J. Thorpe	301	19.8%
Liberal Democrats	J. Whitaker	151	9.9%
Turnout			20.2%
Labour hold			

=== Kingsway ===
Location of Kingsway ward

Kingsway
Party	Candidate	Votes	%
Labour	P. Hill	979	45.0%
Conservative	B. Maw	862	39.7%
Liberal Democrats	R. Troup	333	15.3%
Turnout			27.2%
Labour hold			

=== Litchurch ===
Location of Litchurch ward

Litchurch
Party	Candidate	Votes	%
Labour	A. Rehman	1,158	73.1%
Conservative	J. Magee	222	14.0%
Green	J. Macdonald	123	7.8%
Liberal Democrats	W. Savage	81	5.1%
Turnout			22.0%
Labour hold			

=== Spondon ===
Location of Spondon ward

Spondon
Party	Candidate	Votes	%
Conservative	C. Brown	1,520	46.6%
Labour	R. Morgan	1,459	44.7%
Liberal Democrats	P. Peat	282	8.6%
Turnout			33.3%
Conservative hold			
