= Whicker's World =

- Title screen (1978–80), featuring Concorde
- Genre: Documentary
- Presented by: Alan Whicker
- Theme music composer: "West End" by Laurie Johnson (1959–68); "Horizons" by Frank Talley and The New Concert Orchestra (1968–77); Andrew Lloyd Webber (1978–80); "Newsweek" by Graham de Wilde (1984)
- Country of origin: United Kingdom
- Original language: English

Production
- Production companies: BBC; Yorkshire Television

Original release
- Network: BBC1 (1959–1965, 1984–1992); BBC2 (1965–1968); ITV (1968–1983, 1992–1994)
- Release: 21 March 1959 – 18 December 1994

Whicker's World is a British television documentary series that ran from 21 March 1959 to 18 December 1994, presented by journalist and broadcaster Alan Whicker.

Originally a segment on the BBC's Tonight programme in 1959, Whicker's World became a fully-fledged television series in its own right in the 1960s. The series was first shown by the BBC until 1968, and then by ITV from 1968 to 1983, during which time it was produced by Yorkshire Television, in which Whicker himself was a shareholder. The series returned to the BBC in 1984, and to ITV again in 1992.

== Series history ==
=== Origins on Tonight ===
Alan Whicker had already been a journalist and broadcaster—including time as a foreign correspondent during the Korean War—before he joined the team of presenters on Tonight at its launch in 1957. He was given his own regular segment, Whicker's World, starting on 21 March 1959. It was ostensibly a travel documentary format, though its focus was on interesting or unusual people in different parts of the world (from the perspective of someone living in the United Kingdom in the era before affordable air travel) rather than sightseeing, or the act of travel itself. Whicker preferred to describe himself as a "journalist who travels" rather than a "travel journalist".

Despite his relatively young age – he was 37 when Whicker's World first aired – Whicker quickly became known for his distinctive appearance and broadcasting style: an old-fashioned, stiff-upper-lip Englishman with "the neat moustache, the blazer or, in tropical climes, a Doug Hayward gabardine suit" who was always "politely interested and innocently perplexed". As much as this was also Whicker's off-camera fashion sense and manner of speaking, he soon realised that it was also an effective way of encouraging interviewees who might otherwise be hostile or suspicious to let their guard down—an approach which even extended to a policy of only ever asking questions in English. As he explained in an interview in 2010:

"It is hard to shoot a man, or even strike him with your rifle butt, when he is smiling at you in a friendly way and talking about something foreign. When they expect you to be humble and timid, a certain pleasant senior-office[r] asperity throws them off-balance. This is even more effective when guards or police or hoodlums don't understand English. [Attempting to speak their language] instantly places you in the subordinate position of supplication, and invites questions. Since adopting this haughty approach, I am pleased to say I have hardly ever been shot."

Though Tonight was a magazine-style current affairs show with multiple presenters, Whicker's reports proved popular with viewers and were given extra prominence within only a few years. Several episodes were given over entirely to Whicker's World:

- "Megamillionaire: The Incredible Kingdom of William Randolph Hearst" (4 April 1962)
- "Hotel Concord" (8 August 1962)
- "The Delinquents" (15 August 1962)
- "The Solitary Billionaire: J. Paul Getty" (24 February 1963)
- "The Model Millionairess" (7 May 1963)
- "Alan Whicker Goes to Sweden" (18 May 1963)
- "Deep in the Heart of Texas: Superamerica" (5 August 1963)
- "Deep in the Heart of Texas: Texas Justice" (18 August 1963)
- "A Sort of Paradise" (3 September 1963)
- "Death in the Morning: The Private World of the Quorn" (17 March 1964)
- "A Little Madness: The Private World of the Pocomaniacs" (3 November 1964)
- "These Humble Shores: Alan Whicker in Monte Carlo" (21 January 1965)

There were also mini-series of full-episode clip shows, made by stitching together previously aired short segments:

- Six Films of Six Places (1961)—episodes on each of Hong Kong, the Philippines, Japan, Singapore, Hawaii, and Mexico
- Whicker Down Under (1961)—four episodes on Australia
- Whicker on Top of the World (1962)—two episodes on Alaska
- Whicker Down Mexico Way (1963)—two episodes on Mexico

Whicker's approach to finding and reporting stories from around the world for Tonight was carried over when Whicker's World finally span-off as its own show in October 1965, with the format of the show continuing in the style established by these specials.

=== Spin-off from Tonight ===
Whicker's World began airing as a standalone show on BBC Two on 16 October 1965 with "Plumes For My Rich Aunt", a half-hour report looking at the excesses of that year's Paris Fashion Week, and continued to air irregularly—once or twice a month—until the final episode of its first BBC run ("Two Sides of Fleet Street") on 18 May 1968.

The show then moved to ITV as a production of Yorkshire Television, which had been established by a consortium to (successfully) bid for the newly created Yorkshire franchise area in 1967—Whicker himself was one of its shareholders, and the defection of Whicker's World from the BBC was seen as something of a coup for the network. Several of the episodes in Whicker's first ITV series looked at people and places in Yorkshire itself as a result—including interviewing Halifax native Percy Shaw (the inventor of cat's eyes), visiting elite horse trainers in Middleham, and attending a grouse shoot on the Glorious Twelfth.

Although all episodes of Whicker's World were self-contained, Whicker continued the pattern established at Tonight of devoting mini-series of episodes to one particular location, subject, or theme—such as the South Pacific, package holidays, or lifestyle fads. In particular, he produced seven mini-series devoted to the United States and four about Australia (if including the earlier Tonight clip shows Whicker on Top of the World and Whicker Down Under, and considering the "Deep in the Heart of Texas" episodes from 1963 as a two-part series).

Not all of these "series within a series" were given their own unique titles—for example, one of the seasons of films about the US, broadcast in 1977, was simply branded as Whicker's World—but those seasons which were given their own unique names included:

| Series | Network | Year | No. episodes | Topic |
|---|---|---|---|---|
| Whicker's New World | ITV | 1969 | 6 | An exploration of "new lifestyles" in the U.S. |
| Whicker In Europe | ITV | 1969–70 | 7 | Interviews with eccentric Europeans |
| Whicker's Walkabout: Seven Scenes From Down Under | ITV | 1970 | 8 | Interviews with eccentric Australians (Note: Despite its name this series actually featured eight episodes due to the inclusion of "Broken Hill – Closed City", a special report from Broken Hill, New South Wales) |
| The World of Whicker | ITV | 1971 | 10 | Films about the Caribbean and Florida |
| Whicker's Orient | ITV | 1972 | 6 | Reports from Thailand, Hong Kong, and Bali |
| Whicker Within a Woman's World | ITV | 1972 | 6 | Interviews with women working in traditionally male occupations |
| Whicker's South Seas | ITV | 1973 | 6 | Travels among the island nations of the South Pacific |
| Whicker's Way Out West | ITV | 1973 | 8 | Further explorations of "new lifestyles", with a focus on the American West |
| Whicker's World: Down Under | ITV | 1976 | 7 | Further interviews with eccentric Australians (Note: Not to be confused with the Whicker Down Under clip show from 1961) |
| Whicker's World: India | ITV | 1978 | 6 | Reports from across India |
| Whicker's World: California | ITV | 1980 | 6 | Despatches from the most populous U.S. state |
| Whicker's World: A Fast Boat to China | BBC | 1984 | 4 | Whicker boards the QE2 for a three-month cruise across the Pacific |
| Whicker's World: Living With Uncle Sam | BBC | 1985 | 10 | Interviews with Britons who have emigrated to the United States |
| Whicker's World: Living With Waltzing Matilda | BBC | 1988 | 10 | Interviews with Britons who have emigrated to Australia, to coincide with the country's bicentennial celebrations |
| Whicker's World: Hong Kong | BBC | 1990 | 8 | Interviews with Hong Kong residents in anticipation of the handover to China |
| Whicker's World: A Taste of Spain | BBC | 1992 | 8 | Reports from across Spain ahead of the 1992 Summer Olympics in Barcelona |
| Around Whicker's World: The Ultimate Package | ITV | 1992 | 4 | Whicker signs up for a package tour holiday across the globe |

For more than 30 years Whicker's interviewees included small-town characters, powerful politicians, iconic celebrities, and even convicted criminals. Subjects he covered were as far-ranging as military dictators, British expatriates living in other countries, the feminist movement, the Tanka people of Hong Kong, the American Gay Rights movement, the building of Disney World in Florida, and the plastic surgery industry.

While he often spoke with people from a wide range of social backgrounds and classes, some of his more wealthy or famous interviewees included actors Peter Sellers, Joan Collins, Britt Ekland, Liza Minnelli, and Christopher Lee, several former Maharajas of India, and various members of the British aristocracy. Many of his most notable episodes were one-off specials outside of the mini-series detailed above—such as interviews with Paraguayan dictator Alfredo Stroessner (1970), novelist Harold Robbins (1971), Sultan of Brunei Hassanal Bolkiah (1992), and (in the last-ever episode of the show) opera singer Luciano Pavarotti (1994). Two specials were filmed on the Orient Express: the first on the Venice-Simplon Orient Express in 1982, and the second on the Eastern & Oriental Express in 1993. Another two-part special, broadcast in 1993, was filmed at the 1992 Miss World competition at Sun City, South Africa, which Whicker participated in as one of the judges.

Perhaps his most famous episode (which "would make his name" according to Simon Calder) was broadcast in 1969, when he became the first Western journalist to secure an extended face-to-face interview with Haitian dictator François "Papa Doc" Duvalier. Whicker claimed to have flown to Haiti, sent a telex to Duvalier saying, "Mr President, I am outside your door," then headed to Duvalier's palace without waiting for a reply; the dictator was apparently so charmed by Whicker's forthrightness that he even invited the broadcaster to come Christmas shopping with him and his family in Port-au-Prince.

Whicker almost always sourced titles or subtitles for his episodes by quoting either his interviewees or his own narration—for example, his report on protests against racial segregation at the 1967 Kentucky Derby was subtitled "My People Are More Important Than a Few Horses Running...", an argument made by Muhammad Ali (at the time still known as Cassius Clay) in the episode. Living With Waltzing Matilda was the only series not to follow this convention, with each episode simply called "Part One", "Part Two", etc.

=== Related series ===
A six-part clip show – The First Million Miles – was broadcast in 1984 to promote the return of Whicker's World to the BBC from ITV. It featured highlights from the show's first run on the BBC, from 1959 to 1968.

In 1998, Whicker made a six-part radio series, Around Whicker's World, for BBC Radio 2.

In 2009, he returned to television for the final time with Alan Whicker's Journey Of A Lifetime, a four-part series for the BBC in which he revisited some of the locations and people shown in Whicker's World decades earlier to see how their lives had progressed since his original interviews with them. Included in this was a third visit to American plastic surgeon Dr. Kurt Wagner and his wife Kathy, about whom Whicker had already made two programmes (in 1973 and 1980), and had considered among his favourite interviewees.

=== Music ===
The original theme music for the programme was The Trend Setters, recorded by Laurie Johnson for the KPM Music Library in 1960 and produced by Adrian Kerridge. It was later known as "Whicker's World (West End)". When the series moved to ITV in the late 1960s, a new theme, Horizons by Frank Talley and The New Concert Orchestra, was used until 1977, when it was replaced by another new theme composed by Andrew Lloyd Webber. When the series returned to the BBC in 1984, "Newsweek", a piece composed by Graham de Wilde for KPM Musichouse, was used as the theme.

== Awards ==
Whicker's World was a huge ratings success in the UK, and one of the longest-running series in the history of British television. The series was nominated for a variety of awards throughout its run, including several BAFTA Television Awards:

Whicker's World BAFTA Television awards and nominations
| Year | Category | Nominee | Result |
|---|---|---|---|
| 1964 | Factual Personality | Alan Whicker | Won |
| 1970 | Factual Documentary | Whicker's New World (including specials "Papa Doc: The Black Sheep" and "The Pugnacious Pacifist") | Nominated |
| 1978 | Film Sound | Don Atkinson (for Whicker's World) | Nominated |
| | Film Editor | Stan Hawkes (for Whicker's World episode "Palm Beach, Florida: How Can I Lie About My Age When My Son Needs a Facelift..?") | Nominated |
| | Documentary | Whicker's World episode "Palm Beach, Florida: How Can I Lie About My Age When My Son Needs a Facelift..?" | Nominated |
| | Richard Dimbleby Award | Alan Whicker | Won |
| 1979 | Documentary | Whicker's World: India episode "He's A Stuck-Up Maharajah – I'm Not Going To Marry Him" | Nominated |
| 1986 | Factual Series | Whicker's World: Living With Uncle Sam | Nominated |

In 1971, the series won the Dumont International Journalism Award at the University of California for the 1969 episode "Papa Doc: The Black Sheep". The episode "Harold Robbins: I'm The World's Best Writer, There's Nothing Else to Say" won the Best Interview Programme Award at the Hollywood Festival of World Television in 1972.

== Home media ==
Given that Whicker's World's earliest episodes – both the short segments on the BBC's Tonight programme from 1959 to 1965 and episodes from its first run as a standalone series from 1965 to 1968 – were produced before the BBC instituted a formal archival policy in the 1970s, many are likely lost. However, some surviving segments from the early Tonight era have been shared via social media by the BBC Archives team. This includes the very first "episode", which saw Whicker reporting from Aberdeen Harbour in Hong Kong for Tonight.

The BBC has also released two full episodes from 1967 – "The Love Generation: I'm Here to Tell You – It's Happening All Over!" and "Conflict in Kentucky: My People Are More Important Than a Few Horses Running..." – on iPlayer, as well as Whicker's special edition of Tonight from 1963 where he interviewed Jean Paul Getty. Another full episode from 1968 ("A Handful of Horrors: I Don't Like My Monsters to Have Oedipus Complexes") is available as a bonus feature on the 2020 Blu-ray release of the Doctor Who serial "The Power of the Daleks". Other than these, the only BBC Whicker series to get an official release on either streaming or physical media has been Journey Of A Lifetime from 2009.

Episodes of Whicker's World broadcast on ITV have been released on DVD by Network. A seven-disc "Best Of" collection includes a selection of episodes from the very first ITV series in 1968 through to Whicker's interview with the Sultan of Brunei in 1992. From May 2016 onwards Network also began releasing DVD sets of each successive ITV series with their episodes in chronological broadcast order, which also include one-off specials; for example, Whicker's interview with Papa Doc is included on the Whicker's New World DVD as it first aired midway through that series' original broadcast. However, in June 2023 Network entered administration, by which time only the first six ITV series – up to and including Whicker's Orient from 1972 – had been released.

== Merchandising ==
Several books, written by Whicker, were published as tie-ins to the series, including Whicker's New World (1985) and Whicker's World Down Under (1988). Whicker's autobiography, Within Whicker's World, was published in 1982; it chronicled many of the journeys he had made in the series. A second volume, Whicker's World – Take 2, was published in 2002, and a third volume, Journey of a Lifetime, was published in 2009.

The Whicker's World brand also spread into other merchandise tie-ins. In the 1970s, Whitman Publishing released Whicker's World jigsaw puzzles featuring images from Whicker's travels. A board game based on Whicker's World was released in 1989 by Paul Lamond Games.

== Cultural impact ==
By the late 1960s, Whicker's on-screen persona – both his trademark look of moustache, glasses and blazer, and his distinctive voice – had become iconic within the UK. An "Alan Whicker Appreciation Society" was founded in the 1970s and reportedly had more than 20,000 members at its height. They dressed and spoke like Whicker (in a style described as "Whickeric"), and even played games of cricket where the word "wicket" was replaced with "Whicker" (for example, in "Whicker keeper").

The series was spoofed by the British comedian Benny Hill in a sketch on his show called "Knickers World", and it was parodied again in 1972 by Monty Python's Flying Circus with a sketch set on a tropical "Whicker Island" where all of the inhabitants were Alan Whicker clones.

In the 1980s, Whicker appeared in several television commercials for Barclaycard that were based on Whicker's World and featured Whicker in various foreign locations.

In 1981, Whicker's World was spoofed by The Evasions, a British funk group whose novelty song "Wikka Wrap" featured songwriter Graham de Wilde impersonating Whicker. The single reached the UK Top 20 in June 1981; the song was later sampled in American rapper Coolio's 1996 song "1, 2, 3, 4 (Sumpin' New)". Graham de Wilde also composed the theme tune for the 1980s BBC episodes of Whicker's World.

== Legacy ==
Whicker's development of travel journalism as a documentary form in Whicker's World, and his skill at encouraging interviewees to open up on camera, have both been influential on later generations of broadcasters and journalists, including Michael Palin and Michael Parkinson. In particular, his talent for ingratiating himself with "edgy" or "eccentric" subjects by adopting a seemingly-naive persona on location—contrasted with his deadpan narration recorded later during editing—has been cited as an influence on documentarians like Louis Theroux.

The Whickers, a foundation and annual award that encourages the making of quality documentary programmes, was established in 2015 with money left in Whicker's will. Overseen by Whicker's partner Valerie Kleeman and run by documentary maker Jane Ray, each year The Whickers awards £100,000 to a new director with the most promising pitch for an authored film or television documentary. There are also separate funding and recognition awards for audio documentaries.

== See also ==
- Around Whicker's World
