= Villiers High School =

Location
- Boyd Avenue; Southall, Greater London; England; 51.5097°N 0.3731°W

Information
- Type: Secondary school
- Established: 1907
- Local authority: Ealing
- Department for Education URN: 101928 Tables
- Ofsted: Reports
- Head teacher: Christopher Richards
- Staff: 180
- Gender: coeducational
- Age: 11 to 18
- Enrolment: 1,498 (2024)
- Website: http://www.villiers.ealing.sch.uk/

Villiers High School is a co-educational 11–18 school and sixth form in the Southall area of the west London borough of Ealing. The school is situated in Boyd Avenue, in the heart of Southall. Christopher Richards was appointed Headteacher in September 2023. As of 2022 it has around 1,500 pupils on roll, 250 of whom are in the sixth form.

The local authority, the London Borough of Ealing, administers the Co-ordinated High School Admissions Scheme, for Villiers High School.

== History ==
The school first opened as Southall County School in 1907. It changed its name to Southall Grammar in 1945. In 1963 the school merged with Southall College of Technology (a boys' technical school, which had been located in Beaconsfield Road) and was renamed Southall Grammar Technical School. The name was changed to Villiers High School in 1974. The sixth-form opened in 2009.

== Ofsted ==
After inspections which rated the school as Good with Outstanding features in 2007 and Satisfactory in 2010, the school was rated Good in all areas in spring 2015 following an Ofsted inspection. The report found the school is "rapidly improving" under "very strong" leadership of the senior leadership team.

The school was described as "a harmonious community characterised by mutual respect and high aspirations".

== Notable teaching staff ==
In 2008, David Onllwyn Jones, an assistant head teacher at the school, was made Member of the Order of the British Empire for his services to education.

== Notable former pupils ==
- Imran Qayyum, cricketer for Kent County Cricket Club

=== Southall Grammar Technical School ===
- Alan Charles, Derbyshire Police and Crime Commissioner from 2012 to 2016
- Prof John Woodhouse FRS, Professor of Geophysics from 1990 to 2014 at the University of Oxford, and Head from 2000 to 2003 and 2011 to 2012 of the Department of Earth Sciences; winner of the Gold Medal of the Royal Astronomical Society in 2010, the Inge Lehmann Medal in 2001, and the James B. Macelwane Medal in 1984

=== Southall Grammar School ===
- Ray Dorset, singer with Mungo Jerry
- Doug Hayward, tailor
- Ronald Peter Nash CMG LVO, High Commissioner to Trinidad and Tobago from 2004 to 2007, and Ambassador to Afghanistan from 2002 to 2003
- Allan Segal, documentary television film-maker for World in Action

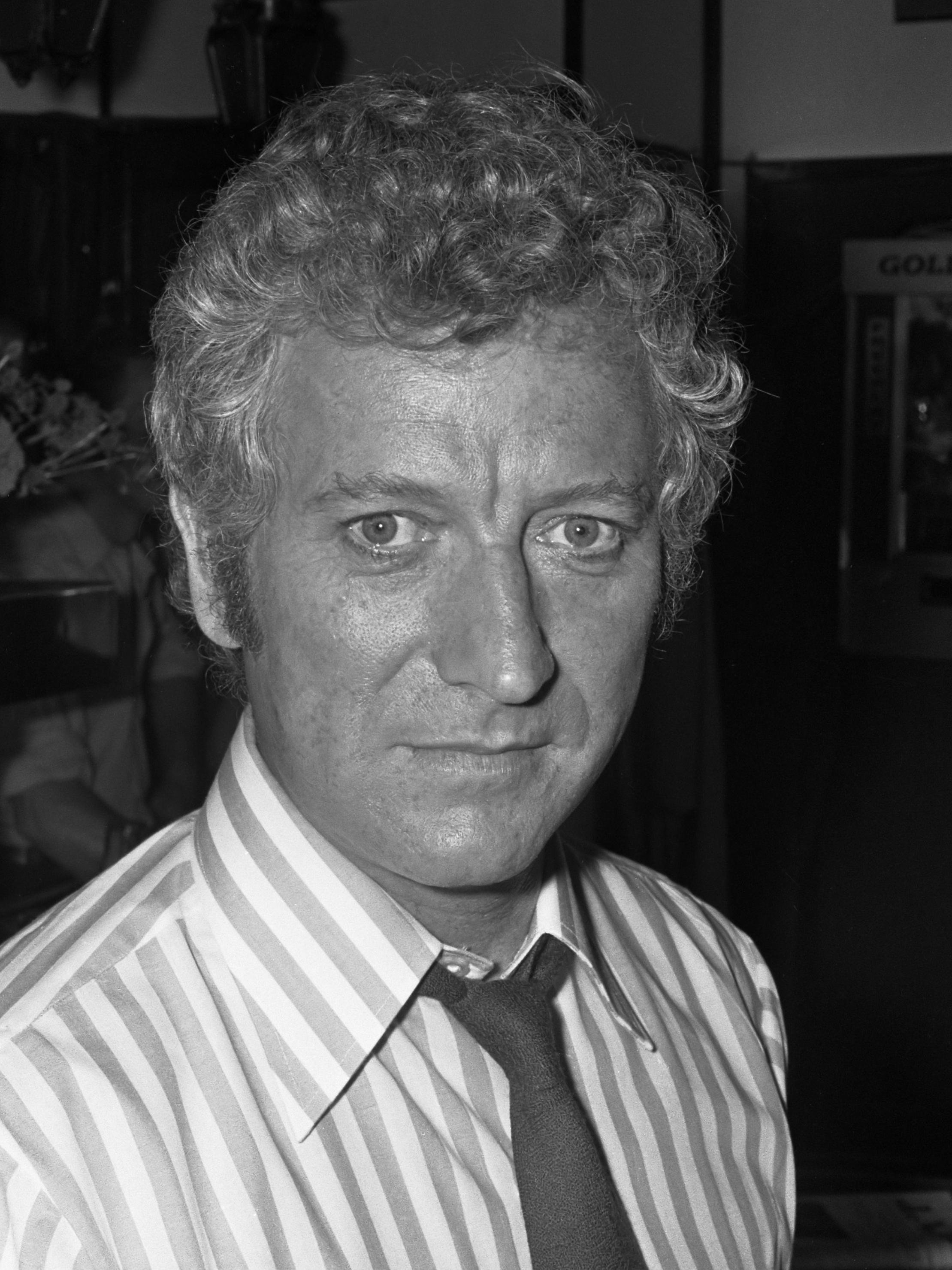
Barry Foster in August 1972, playing Van der Valk at the Joop Heuvel cafe in Amsterdam

=== Southall County School ===
- Barry Foster (actor), known in the early 1970s for Thames Television's Van der Valk
- Sir Leslie Murphy, chairman from 1977 to 1979 of the National Enterprise Board
- Lionel Robbins, Baron Robbins of Clare Market CH CB, economist at the LSE who wrote An Essay on the Nature and Significance of Economic Science; his famous Robbins Report led to expansion of universities in the 1960s, from the former Colleges of Technology, and the creation of the Council for National Academic Awards (CNAA, which awarded degrees to polytechnics)
- Sydney Templeman, Baron Templeman, one of the Lords of Appeal in Ordinary from 1982 to 1994, President from 1974 to 1976 of the Senate of the Inns of Court and the Bar (now the Bar Standards Board)
- Elsie Whetnall, philosopher
