= Derbyshire Constabulary =

English territorial police force

Agency overview
- Formed: 1 April 1967; 59 years ago
- Employees: 3,952
- Volunteers: 445
- Annual budget: £157.2 million

Jurisdictional structure
- Operations jurisdiction: Derbyshire, England
- Map of police area
- Area: 2,625 square kilometres (1,014 sq mi)2,625 km^{2}
- Population: 1 million
- Legal jurisdiction: England and Wales
- Constituting instrument: Police Act 1996
- General nature: Local civilian police

Operational structure
- Overseen by: His Majesty's Inspectorate of Constabulary and Fire & Rescue Services; Independent Office for Police Conduct
- Headquarters: Ripley
- Constables: 2,085
- Unsworn members: Community support officer 166
- Police and crime commissioner responsible: Nicolle Ndiweni
- Agency executive: Rachel Swann, Chief constable
- Divisions: North, South, and Ops

Facilities
- Stations: 20: Alfreton; Heanor; Ilkeston; Long Eaton; Ripley; Ashbourne; Bakewell; Buxton; Glossop; Matlock; Chesterfield; Clay Cross; Killamarsh; Shirebrook; Staveley; Derby North; Derby East; Pear Tree; Swadlincote

Website
- www.derbyshire.police.uk

Derbyshire Constabulary is the territorial police force responsible for policing the county of Derbyshire, England. The force covers an area of over 1,000 square miles (3,000 km^{2}) with a population of just under one million.

== History ==
In 1965, the force had an establishment of 852 and an actual strength of 775.

=== Chief constables ===
- 1873–unknown: Francis Joseph Parry
- 1876–1898: Lieutenant-Colonel William Addis Delacombe
- 1898–unknown: Capt. Henry Mansfield Haywood
- 1918–c. 1927: Major Philip Francis Ross Anley
- 1954–1967: William Ewart Pitts
- 1967–1979: Sir Walter Stansfield (knighted 1979 New Year Honours)
- 1979–1981: James Fryer
- 1981–1985: Alfred Parrish
- 1985–1990: Alan Smith
- 1990–2000: John Newing
- 2001–2007: David Coleman
- 2007–2017: Mick Creedon
- 2017–2020: Peter Goodman
- 2020–2026: Rachel Swann
- 2026-present: Simon Blatchly

=== Officers killed in the line of duty ===
The Police Roll of Honour Trust and Police Memorial Trust list and commemorate all British police officers killed in the line of duty. Since its establishment in 1984, the Police Memorial Trust has erected 50 memorials nationally to some of those officers.

Since 1828 the following officers of Derbyshire Constabulary were killed while attempting to prevent or stop a crime in progress:

- Parish Constable William Taylor, 1828 (fatally injured arresting two men)
- Police Constable Joseph Moss, 1879 (shot whilst dealing with a prisoner)
- Police Constable Stevenson, 2013 (collapsed and died while on duty)

== Organisation and structure ==
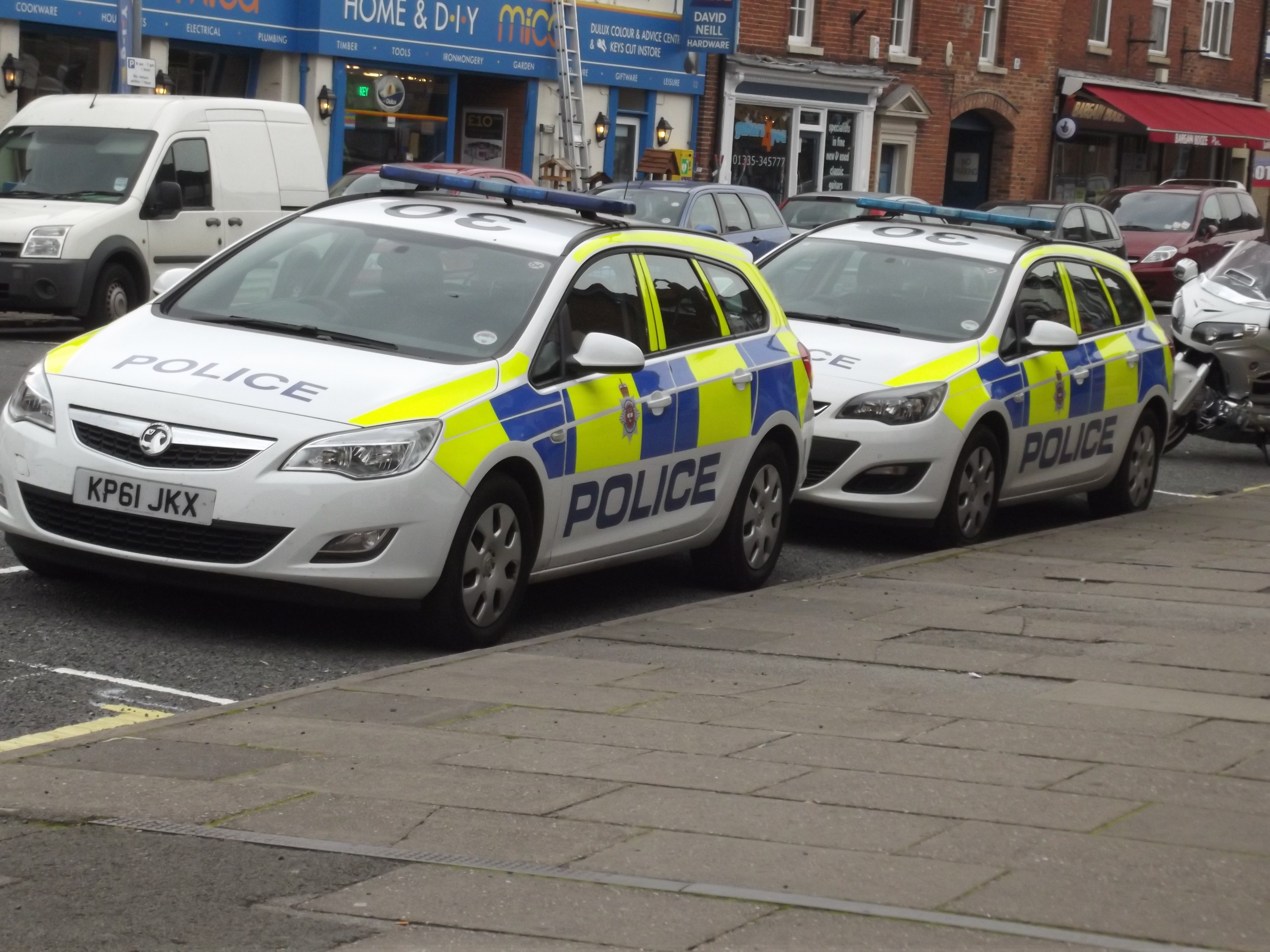
Derbyshire Police vehicles at a police station in 2014

To police the county the force is divided into two territorial divisions, based respectively in the towns of Buxton and Chesterfield (North Division – covering High Peak and Derbyshire Dales District Council areas, Chesterfield, NE Derbyshire, Amber Valley and Bolsover and the villages of South Normanton and Pinxton which lie within the boundaries of Bolsover District Council), and Derby (South Division – policing the city of Derby and the districts of Erewash, Long Eaton and South Derbyshire). The Force Headquarters, near Ripley and close to the A38 road, is Butterley Hall, former residence of Benjamin Outram and once owned by the Butterley Company.

The Old Hall and later additional buildings in the large grounds house much of the force's central administrative services. The Ops Divisions HQ at Wyatts Way Ripley (adjacent to force Headquarters) is now the home of the Operational Support Division which encompasses the Road Policing Unit (with bases at Cotton Lane in Derby, Beetwell Street in Chesterfield and Chapel-en-le-Frith), ARU (Armed Response Unit), Dog Section, Uniform Task Force and Road Policing Support (Collision Investigators).

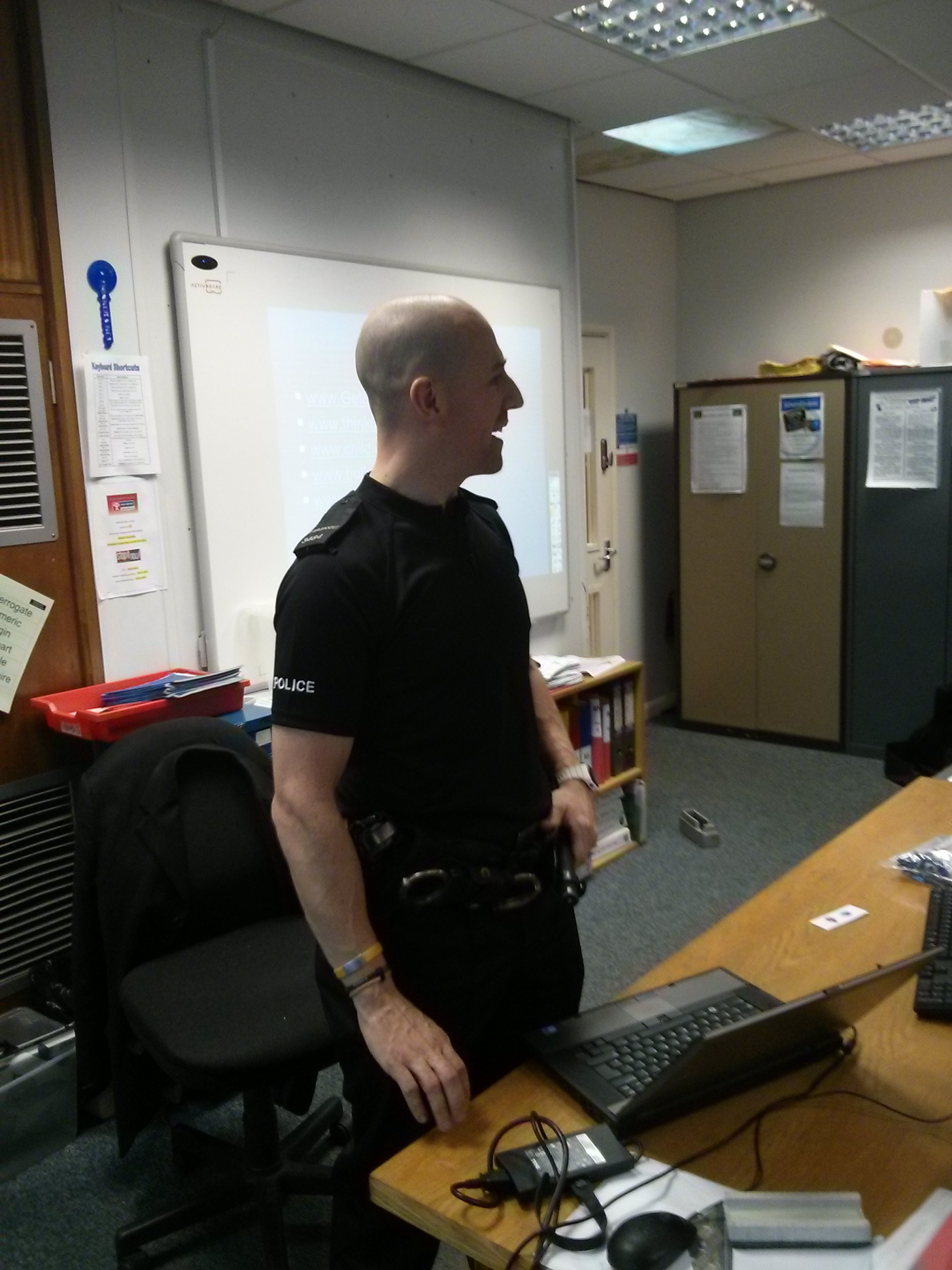
Derbyshire P.C. at Allestree Woodlands School discussing online safety

The Constabulary is led by the chief constable, assisted by a Deputy and two assistant chief constables. Each division is headed by a chief superintendent—the divisional commander—and each division is divided into Sections, which are led by an inspector. The force has an authorised establishment of 2,085 police officers, 83 special constables and 202 Police Community Support Officers (PCSOs)

The chief officers of the force formerly worked in partnership with the 17 publicly elected representatives on the Derbyshire Police Authority, which shared responsibility for budgets and policy, and was intended to ensure that the public of Derbyshire had a voice in the policing of their county. Since the introduction of the Police Reform and Social Responsibility Act 2011 the Derbyshire Police and Crime Commissioner (PCC) is now responsible for tasks that were once completed by the Police Authority. In November 2012, Alan Charles was elected as PCC for a four-year term. Charles previously served as Vice Chair of the Derbyshire Police Authority.

== PEEL inspection ==
His Majesty's Inspectorate of Constabulary and Fire & Rescue Services (HMICFRS) conducts a periodic police effectiveness, efficiency and legitimacy (PEEL) inspection of each police service's performance. In its latest PEEL inspection, Derbyshire Constabulary was rated as follows:

	Outstanding	Good	Adequate	Requires Improvement	Inadequate
2021/22 rating			Preventing crime; Recording data about crime; Treatment of the public; Managing offenders	Investigating crime; Responding to the public; Protecting vulnerable people; Developing a positive workplace; Good use of resources	

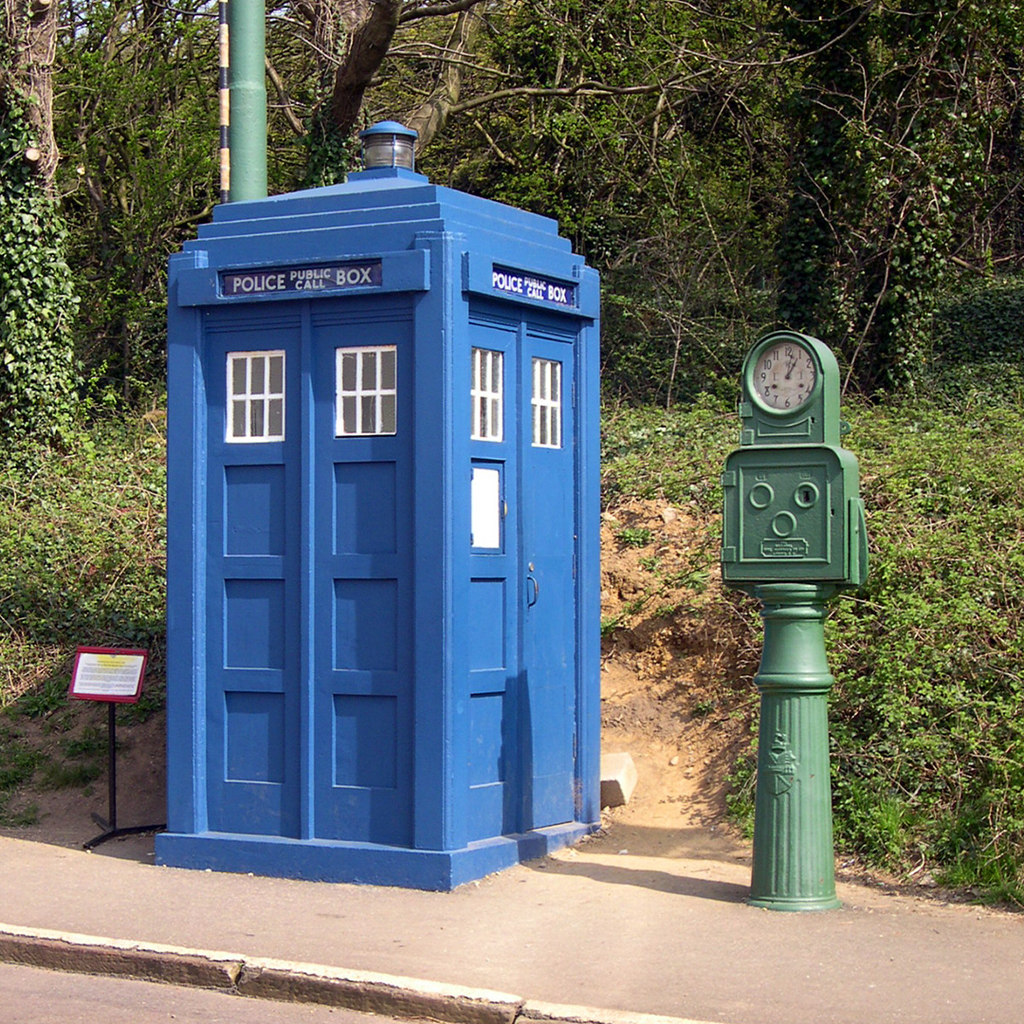
An old Police Box, now in Crich museum

== Regionalisation ==
Proposals were made by the Home Secretary on 20 March 2006 to integrate groups of police forces in England and Wales into 'strategic' forces, which he saw as being more 'fit for purpose' in terms of combating terrorism and organised crime. Under these proposals Derbyshire would have merged with nearby forces to create an 'East Midlands Police'. However, these proposals were unpopular and were later cancelled.

== See also ==
- Law enforcement in the United Kingdom
- List of law enforcement agencies in the United Kingdom, Crown Dependencies and British Overseas Territories
- North Midlands Helicopter Support Unit (now defunct)
- Murder of Barbara Mayo, infamous unsolved murder of a woman in 1970 which Derbyshire Constabulary was responsible for investigating
