= 2004 Derby City Council election =

2004 UK local government election

← 2003	10 June 2004	2006 →

17 of 51 seats to Derby City Council 26 seats needed for a majority
	First party	Second party
Party	Labour	Liberal Democrats
Seats won	9	5
Seats after	24	14
Seat change	Steady	▲1
Popular vote	25,794	23,098
Percentage	32.2%	28.9%
Swing	▲0.7%	▼2.0%
	Third party	Fourth party
Party	Conservative	UKIP
Seats won	3	3
Seats after	11	1
Seat change	▼1	▲1
Popular vote	22,214	7,419
Percentage	27.8%	9.3%
Swing	▼2.8%	▲9.3%
Council control before election
No overall control
Council control after election
No overall control

The 2004 Derby City Council election took place on 10 June 2004 to elect members of Derby City Council in England. One third of the council was up for election and the council stayed under no overall control.

The results saw the Labour Party gain a seat from the Conservatives but lose one to the Liberal Democrats. They also saw Frank Leeming from the United Kingdom Independence Party win the party's first council seat in Derby, gaining a seat that had formerly been held by independent, Ron Allen, who had died in March. Leeming was expected to hold the balance of power on the council between Labour and a Liberal Democrat/Conservative alliance depending on the outcome of a by-election in July.

After the election, the composition of the council was:

- Labour 24
- Liberal Democrat 14
- Conservative 11
- United Kingdom Independence Party 1
- Vacant 1

== Election result ==
2004 Derby local election result
Party	Seats	Gains	Losses	Net gain/loss	Seats %	Votes %	Votes	+/−
Labour	9	1	1	Steady	50.0	32.2	25,794	
Liberal Democrats	5	1	0	▲1	27.8	28.9	23,098	
Conservative	3	0	1	▼1	16.7	27.8	22,214	
UKIP	1	1	0	▲1	5.6	9.3	7,419	
Independent	0	0	1	▼1	0.0	0.9	743	
Respect	0	0	0	Steady	0.0	0.9	701	
Monster Raving Loony	0	0	0	Steady	0.0	0.1	78	

== Ward results ==
=== Abbey ===
Location of Abbey ward

Abbey
Party	Candidate	Votes	%	±%
Liberal Democrats	Ann Jackman	1,558	42.4	−10.1
Labour	Lisa Higginbottom	1,054	28.7	−3.6
UKIP	Margaret Rooney	530	14.4	+14.4
Conservative	Douglas Sice	455	12.4	+0.7
Monster Raving Loony	Craig Reynolds	78	2.1	+2.1
Majority		504	13.7	−6.5
Turnout		3,675	41.9	+16.3
Liberal Democrats hold		Swing		

=== Allestree ===
Location of Allestree ward

Allestree
Party	Candidate	Votes	%	±%
Conservative	Philip Hickson	2,879	45.4	−5.3
Labour	Margot Keats	1,246	19.7	−4.6
UKIP	Ronald McKeown	1,174	18.5	+18.5
Liberal Democrats	Roger Jackson	1,038	16.4	−8.6
Majority		1,633	25.7	+0.0
Turnout		6,337	60.4	+21.3
Conservative hold		Swing		

=== Alvaston ===
Location of Alvaston ward

Alvaston
Party	Candidate	Votes	%	±%
Labour	Alan Graves	1,638	40.1	−7.4
UKIP	Martin Bardoe	1,123	27.5	+27.5
Conservative	Simon Hart	702	17.2	−3.5
Liberal Democrats	Lorraine Brown	618	15.1	−0.6
Majority		515	12.6	−14.2
Turnout		4,081	41.3	+16.3
Labour hold		Swing		

=== Arboretum ===
Location of Arboretum ward

Arboretum
Party	Candidate	Votes	%	±%
Labour	Shiraz Khan	2,055	45.6	+0.8
Liberal Democrats	Rehmet Kham	1,791	39.7	+16.9
Conservative	Joan Magee	660	14.6	−5.9
Majority		264	5.9	−16.1
Turnout		4,506	49.4	+23.3
Labour hold		Swing		

=== Blagreaves ===
Location of Blagreaves ward

Blagreaves
Party	Candidate	Votes	%	±%
Liberal Democrats	Sean Marshall	2,617	55.1	−2.4
Labour	Prem Shukla	1,268	26.7	+1.1
Conservative	David Jennings	867	18.2	+3.1
Majority		1,349	28.4	−3.5
Turnout		4,752	52.2	+15.5
Liberal Democrats hold		Swing		

=== Boulton ===
Location of Boulton ward

Boulton (2)
Party	Candidate	Votes	%	±%
UKIP	Graham Leeming	1,781		
Labour	Barbara Jackson	1,452		
Labour	Alan Mullarkey	1,237		
UKIP	Paul Roome	1,163		
Conservative	Sean Conway	870		
Conservative	Valerie Clare	585		
Liberal Democrats	Wendy Harbon	353		
Liberal Democrats	Eric Ashburner	342		
Turnout		7,783	45.6	+14.3
UKIP gain from Independent		Swing		
Labour hold		Swing		

=== Chaddesden ===
Location of Chaddesten ward

Chaddesden
Party	Candidate	Votes	%	±%
Labour	John Ahern	1,929	43.2	−6.0
Conservative	Vincent Mills	1,646	36.8	+4.3
Liberal Democrats	Leslie Alcock	699	15.6	+0.7
Independent	Charles McLynn	196	4.4	+1.0
Majority		283	6.4	−10.3
Turnout		4,470	48.2	+18.6
Labour hold		Swing		

=== Chellaston ===
Location of Chellaston ward

Chellaston
Party	Candidate	Votes	%	±%
Labour	Mark Tittley	1,972	41.3	
Conservative	Julie Hickson	1,381	28.9	
UKIP	David Black	1,012	21.2	
Liberal Democrats	Christine Yates	414	8.7	
Majority		391	12.4	
Turnout		4,779	50.7	+16.5
Labour gain from Conservative		Swing		

=== Darley ===
Location of Darley ward

Darley
Party	Candidate	Votes	%	±%
Liberal Democrats	Finbar Richards	1,636	38.7	−3.2
Labour	Michael Futers	1,320	31.2	+2.2
Conservative	Christopher Charlesworth	1,276	30.2	+4.1
Majority		316	7.5	−5.4
Turnout		4,232	48.4	+13.8
Liberal Democrats gain from Labour		Swing		

=== Derwent ===
Location of Derwent ward

Derwent
Party	Candidate	Votes	%	±%
Labour	Margaret Redfern	1,793	49.4	+6.4
Conservative	Franklyn Harwood	1,131	31.2	−5.0
Liberal Democrats	Rafe Nauen	703	19.4	+7.7
Majority		662	18.2	+11.4
Turnout		3,627	41.6	+20.9
Labour hold		Swing		

=== Littleover ===
Location of Littleover ward

Littleover
Party	Candidate	Votes	%	±%
Liberal Democrats	Leslie Allen	2,805	59.9	−4.5
Conservative	Mark Collins	1,179	25.2	+2.7
Labour	Linda McGraw	696	14.9	+1.8
Majority		1,626	34.7	−7.2
Turnout		4,680	51.0	+13.5
Liberal Democrats hold		Swing		

=== Mackworth ===
Location of Mackworth ward

Mackworth
Party	Candidate	Votes	%	±%
Labour	Richard Gerrard	1,631	43.6	−3.9
Liberal Democrats	Simon Lysaczenko	1,220	32.6	+12.0
Conservative	Michael Hickson	886	23.7	−8.2
Majority		411	11.0	−4.6
Turnout		3,737	42.3	+18.4
Labour hold		Swing		

=== Mickleover ===
Location of Mickleover ward

Mickleover
Party	Candidate	Votes	%	±%
Liberal Democrats	Hilary Jones	3,578	58.9	
Conservative	Gillian Tatlow	1,715	28.2	
Labour	David Whitehead	781	12.9	
Majority		1,863	30.7	
Turnout		6,074	56.8	+14.4
Liberal Democrats hold		Swing		

=== Normanton ===
Location of Normanton ward

Normanton
Party	Candidate	Votes	%	±%
Labour	Hardyal Dhindsa	1,583	32.9	−14.7
Liberal Democrats	Lennin Shillingford	914	19.0	−19.5
Respect	Jangir Khan	701	14.6	+14.6
UKIP	Ronald Harrison	636	13.2	+13.2
Independent	Chander Guru	547	11.4	+8.3
Conservative	Mohammed Riasat	432	9.0	−1.8
Majority		669	13.9	+4.8
Turnout		4,813	53.0	+24.1
Labour hold		Swing		

=== Oakwood ===
Location of Oakwood ward

Oakwood
Party	Candidate	Votes	%	±%
Conservative	Richard Smalley	2,230	49.7	−2.4
Labour	Phillip Woodhead	1,468	32.7	−0.6
Liberal Democrats	Simon King	785	17.5	+3.0
Majority		762	17.0	−1.8
Turnout		4,483	47.2	+20.2
Conservative hold		Swing		

=== Sinfin ===
Location of Sinfin ward

Sinfin
Party	Candidate	Votes	%	±%
Labour	Hardial Dhamrait	1,460	45.1	−8.6
Liberal Democrats	Harjonder Naitta	991	30.6	+11.8
Conservative	David Hart	787	24.3	+9.9
Majority		469	14.5	−20.4
Turnout		3,238	37.4	+16.8
Labour hold		Swing		

=== Spondon ===
Location of Spondon ward

Spondon
Party	Candidate	Votes	%	±%
Conservative	Evonne Berry	2,533	53.0	−1.0
Labour	Frank Kirkland	1,211	25.3	−4.9
Liberal Democrats	Patrick Peat	1,036	21.7	+10.0
Majority		1,322	27.7	+3.9
Turnout		4,780	52.3	+17.2
Conservative hold		Swing		
