= 2002 Derby City Council election =

2002 UK local government election

2002 Derby Council election
← 2000	2 May 2002	2003 →

All 51 seats to Derby City Council 26 seats needed for a majority
	First party	Second party
Party	Labour	Liberal Democrats
Last election	29	6
Seats before	29	6
Seats won	27	12
Seats after	27	12
Seat change	▼2	▲6
Popular vote	58,230	43,462
Percentage	38.0%	28.4%
Swing	▼2	▲6
	Third party	Fourth party
Party	Conservative	Independent
Last election	9	0
Seats before	8	1
Seats won	11	1
Seats after	11	1
Seat change	▲3	▲1
Popular vote	48,502	3,098
Percentage	31.6%	2.0%
Swing	▲3	▲1
Council control before election
Labour
Council control after election
Labour

The 2002 Derby City Council election took place on 2 May 2002 to elect members of Derby City Council in England. The whole council was up for election after boundary changes since the last election in 2000 had increased the number of seats by 7. The Labour Party stayed in overall control of the council.

== Election results ==
2002 Derby local election result
Party	Seats	Gains	Losses	Net gain/loss	Seats %	Votes %	Votes	+/−
Labour	27			▼2	52.9	38.0	58,230	
Liberal Democrats	12			▲6	23.5	28.4	43,462	
Conservative	11			▲3	21.6	31.6	48,502	
Independent	1			Steady	2.0	2.0	3,098	

== Ward results ==
=== Abbey ===
Location of Abbey ward

Abbey (3)
Party	Candidate	Votes	%
Liberal Democrats	Maurice Burgess	1,512	
Liberal Democrats	Ann Jackman	1,464	
Liberal Democrats	Bryan Lowe	1,307	
Labour	Michael Fuller	1,071	
Labour	Michael Walker	964	
Labour	Jogindar Johal	908	
Conservative	Valerie Clare	365	
Conservative	Adrian Pegg	349	
Conservative	Douglas Sice	314	
Turnout		8,254	

=== Allestree ===
Location of Allestree ward

Allestree (3)
Party	Candidate	Votes	%
Conservative	Roy Webb	2,726	
Conservative	Philip Hickson	2,621	
Conservative	John Leatherbarrow	2,529	
Labour	Thomas Bradley	1,274	
Labour	David Byrne	1,159	
Labour	Keith Normington	920	
Liberal Democrats	Roger Jackson	721	
Liberal Democrats	Robin Pratt	559	
Liberal Democrats	John-Paul Keane	488	
Turnout		12,997	

=== Alvaston ===
Location of Alvaston ward

Alvaston (3)
Party	Candidate	Votes	%
Labour	Jonathan Bayliss	1,489	
Labour	Alan Graves	1,219	
Labour	Christopher Wynn	1,136	
Conservative	Pauline Jennings	664	
Liberal Democrats	Cara Copestick	605	
Conservative	Colin Pallett	573	
Conservative	Barry Pearn	542	
Liberal Democrats	Audrey Savage	424	
Liberal Democrats	William Savage	383	
Turnout		7,035	

=== Arboretum ===
Location of Arboretum ward

Arboretum (3)
Party	Candidate	Votes	%
Labour	Abdul Rehman	1,463	
Labour	Ashiq Hussain	1,356	
Labour	Fareed Hussain	1,338	
Conservative	Ahmad Javed	893	
Conservative	Mohammed Yaqub	770	
Conservative	Christopher Charlesworth	759	
Liberal Democrats	Paul Whitaker	592	
Liberal Democrats	Mohammed Rashid	477	
Liberal Democrats	Divine Mensah	461	
Turnout		8,109	

=== Blagreaves ===
Location of Blagreaves ward

Blagreaves (3)
Party	Candidate	Votes	%
Liberal Democrats	Ruth Skelton	2,330	
Liberal Democrats	Ann Crosby	2,170	
Liberal Democrats	Robert Troup	2,086	
Labour	Lisa Higginbottom	1,148	
Labour	Pat Hill	1,113	
Labour	Mouhammad Daullah	980	
Conservative	Janice Lee	592	
Conservative	Margaret Sandford	493	
Conservative	Tafseer Iqbal	425	
Turnout		11,337	

=== Boulton ===
Location of Boulton ward

Boulton (3)
Party	Candidate	Votes	%
Labour	Ronald Blanksby	1,406	
Labour	Barbara Jackson	1,214	
Independent	Ronald Allen	1,144	
Labour	Hardyal Dhindsa	1,134	
Independent	Anthony Bethell	1,027	
Independent	Melvyn Borrington	927	
Conservative	Sean Conway	734	
Conservative	David Jennings	556	
Conservative	Matlub Hussain	453	
Liberal Democrats	Kenneth Cowley	305	
Liberal Democrats	Craig Head	228	
Liberal Democrats	Hilary Edwards	212	
Turnout		9,340	

=== Chaddesden ===
Location of Chaddesten ward

Chaddesden (3)
Party	Candidate	Votes	%
Labour	Sara Bolton	1,587	
Labour	John Ahern	1,573	
Labour	Anne MacDonald	1,555	
Conservative	John Taylor	1,000	
Conservative	Vincent Mills	991	
Conservative	Harold Johnson	889	
Liberal Democrats	Les Alcock	438	
Liberal Democrats	Leigh Alcock	322	
Liberal Democrats	Terrence Payne	300	
Turnout		8,655	

=== Chellaston ===
Location of Chellaston ward

Chellaston (3)
Party	Candidate	Votes	%
Conservative	Paul Willitts	1,351	
Conservative	Lesley Skelton	1,336	
Labour	David Whitehead	1,319	
Conservative	Nicholas Van Grudgings	1,262	
Labour	Elizabeth Woolley	947	
Labour	Mnjit Mann	874	
Liberal Democrats	Eric Ashburner	379	
Liberal Democrats	Michael Hardy	343	
Liberal Democrats	Christine Yates	334	
Turnout		8,145	

=== Darley ===
Location of Darley ward

Darley (3)
Party	Candidate	Votes	%
Labour	Martin Repton	1,375	
Labour	Valerie Beech	1,366	
Labour	Michael Futers	1,343	
Conservative	Simon Hart	1,194	
Conservative	Graham Else	1,169	
Conservative	Balbir Samra	995	
Liberal Democrats	Joan Travis	697	
Liberal Democrats	Simon King	680	
Liberal Democrats	Bezz Berry	673	
Turnout		9,492	

=== Derwent ===
Location of Derwent ward

Derwent (3)
Party	Candidate	Votes	%
Labour	David Roberts	1,093	
Labour	Margaret Redfern	981	
Labour	Suman Gupta	820	
Conservative	Philip Lucas	518	
Conservative	Kevin Pearn	434	
Conservative	Christopher Ballantyne	364	
Liberal Democrats	Rafe Nauen	300	
Liberal Democrats	Kenneth Hartley	290	
Liberal Democrats	Susan Troup	222	
Turnout		5,022	

=== Littleover ===
Location of Littleover ward

Littleover (3)
Party	Candidate	Votes	%
Liberal Democrats	Lucy Care	2,695	
Liberal Democrats	Leslie Allen	2,448	
Liberal Democrats	Michael Carr	2,408	
Conservative	Alan Griffiths	742	
Labour	Alan Mullarkey	692	
Conservative	Virginia Lemmings	690	
Conservative	Dennis Horgan	671	
Labour	Joe Naitta	590	
Labour	Masud Akhtar	580	
Turnout		11,519	

=== Mackworth ===
Location of Mackworth ward

Mackworth (3)
Party	Candidate	Votes	%
Labour	Raymond Baxter	1,496	
Labour	Richard Gerrard	1,275	
Labour	Loony Wilsoncroft	1,145	
Conservative	Frank Harwood	633	
Conservative	Gay Evans	615	
Conservative	Richard Pearn	592	
Liberal Democrats	Lor Brown	402	
Liberal Democrats	Philip Clayden	328	
Liberal Democrats	Stuart Handley	308	
Turnout		6,794	

=== Mickleover ===
Location of Mickleover ward

Mickleover (3)
Party	Candidate	Votes	%
Liberal Democrats	Anders Hanson	3,077	
Liberal Democrats	Hilary Jones	2,953	
Liberal Democrats	Margaret Hird	2,953	
Conservative	Christine Pearn	1,320	
Conservative	Keith Webley	1,285	
Conservative	Julie Hadjiska	1,249	
Labour	Philip Taylor	687	
Labour	Steven Poyser	601	
Labour	Lennin Shillingford	568	
Turnout		14,761	

=== Normanton ===
Location of Normanton ward

Normanton (3)
Party	Candidate	Votes	%
Labour	Chris Williamson	1,712	
Labour	Ashok Kalia	1,576	
Labour	Amar Nath	1,566	
Conservative	Mohammad Ali	854	
Conservative	Amjid Ibrahim	801	
Conservative	Jawaid Iqbal	735	
Liberal Democrats	Glenda Howcroft	549	
Liberal Democrats	Lloyd Newby	528	
Liberal Democrats	Jhameel Sharif	460	
Turnout		8,781	

=== Oakwood ===
Location of Oakwood ward

Oakwood (3)
Party	Candidate	Votes	%
Conservative	Pauline Latham	1,362	
Conservative	Richard Smalley	1,341	
Conservative	Paul West	1,341	
Labour	Jack Andrews	941	
Labour	Janet Till	912	
Labour	Philip Woodhead	911	
Liberal Democrats	Charles Baker	419	
Liberal Democrats	Patricia Turner	242	
Liberal Democrats	David Turner	228	
Turnout		7,697	

=== Sinfin ===
Location of Sinfin ward

Sinfin (3)
Party	Candidate	Votes	%
Labour	Robin Turner	1,180	
Labour	Hardial Dhamrait	1,004	
Labour	Prem Chera	1,001	
Liberal Democrats	Jennifer Driscoll	419	
Liberal Democrats	Margaret Skelton	366	
Conservative	Grace Smith	360	
Conservative	David Hart	356	
Conservative	Mohammed Adris	306	
Liberal Democrats	Narinder Singh	278	
Turnout		5,270	

=== Spondon ===
Location of Spondon ward

Spondon (3)
Party	Candidate	Votes	%
Conservative	Colin Brown	1,824	
Conservative	Evonne Berry	1,818	
Conservative	Peter Berry	1,746	
Labour	Michael Byrne	1,316	
Labour	Richard Morgan	1,236	
Labour	Leon Taylor	1,116	
Liberal Democrats	Patrick Peat	536	
Liberal Democrats	Ian Care	289	
Liberal Democrats	Robert Charlesworth	274	
Turnout		10,155	
