= Alan Charles =

Derbyshire Police and Crime Commissioner
- In office 22 November 2012 – 11 May 2016
- Preceded by: Office created
- Succeeded by: Hardyal Dhindsa

Personal details
- Born: 20 January 1950 (age 76) Hayes, Middlesex, England
- Party: Labour
- Spouse: Diane Charles
- Children: 2
- Profession: Electrician, Politician

Alan Charles was the Labour Derbyshire Police and Crime Commissioner from 2012 to 2016. He was the first person to hold the post, having been elected on 15 November 2012. In July 2015, Charles announced that he would not be seeking re-election to the position because he "wanted to spend more time with his family".

== Early life ==
Charles was born on 20 January 1950 in Hayes, Middlesex. He attended Southall Grammar School which he left in 1966 before going on to Uxbridge College where he trained to become an electrician. He completed his training in 1970.

== Career ==
Charles served his apprenticeship as an electrician at a London mental hospital, before starting a workers' co-operative in the energy management industry. In 1993, he left this position in order to serve as Derbyshire County Councillor for Killamarsh. In 1999, he was appointed as chair of the Education Committee, a position which he held until 2009. He was then appointed to the Derbyshire Police Authority and became vice-chair.

== Derbyshire Police and Crime Commissioner ==
In 2012, Charles stood in the elections for Police and Crime Commissioner, which replaced the Police Authority.

He took a position against "G4S-type privatisation" of police support services during the campaign, wearing a wristband with the words "Keep Policing Public". He promised to "protect vulnerable people" and victims of crime, focussing on domestic abuse. He also pledged to fight against cuts to the Derbyshire policing budget beyond a pre-announced 20%. Other pledges included improving road safety, protecting community policing and tackling cruelty to animals.

Charles' candidacy for the Labour Party was endorsed by former Home Secretary David Blunkett.

=== Previous criminal conviction ===
In August 2012, Charles was told that a juvenile offence committed almost 50 years ago would bar him from standing as a PCC. He was given a 12-month conditional discharge for stealing a purse from a handbag when he was 14 years old. Hardyal Dhindsa, a Derby City Councillor, was instead chosen as the new Labour party candidate. However, after further legal advice, Charles was reinstated in time for the election.

=== Election ===
In the election, Charles stood as Labour party candidate against Simon Spencer (Conservative), David Gale (UKIP) and Rod Hutton (Independent). Charles won by a total of 57,248 votes to Spencer's total of 36,469. The turnout was 112,908, 14.4% of the Derbyshire electorate. The first preference votes did not win Charles an overall majority, but he was appointed after votes for Gale and Hutton were eliminated.

==== Results ====
Candidate name	Party	First Preference Votes	First Preference %	Second Preference Votes	Total Votes	Total %
Alan Charles	Labour	50,028	44.3%	7,220	57,248	61.1%
Simon Spencer	Conservative	27,690	24.5%	8,779	36,469	38.9%
David Gale	UKIP	18,097	16.0%	N/A	18,097	N/A
Rod Hutton	Independent	17,093	15.1%	N/A	17,093	N/A

=== Deputy PCC ===
In a controversial move on 30 November 2012, Charles announced he would appoint a deputy on a salary of £56,000 per annum. This move was criticised by many, who saw it as a waste of taxpayers' money, particularly since Charles and the Labour party was opposed to the concept of PCCs in the first place.

== Personal life ==
Charles moved to Killamarsh, Derbyshire in 1973 where he has lived since. He is married to Diane, with whom he has two children, Katy and Sarah, and four grandchildren, Ethan, Charlie, Billy and Bella.
