= 1996 Derby City Council election =

1996 UK local government election

- 2 May 1996

All 44 seats in the Derby City Council 23 seats needed for a majority
| | First party | Second party | Third party |
|---|---|---|---|
| Party | Labour | Conservative | Liberal Democrats |
| Last election | 30 | 12 | 2 |
| Seats won | 39 | 3 | 2 |
| Seat change | ▲9 | ▼9 | Steady |
| Popular vote | 33,386 | 16,593 | 9,716 |
| Percentage | 55.5% | 27.6% | 16.1% |
- Map showing the results of the 1996 Derby City Council elections.
Council control before election
Labour
Council control after election
Labour

The 1996 Derby City Council election took place on 2 May 1996 to elect members of Derby City Council in England. Local elections were held in the United Kingdom in 1996. This was on the same day as other local elections. This election was held ahead of Derby City Council becoming a unitary authority on 1 April 1997. As a result, the entire council was up for election and the elected councillors acted as a shadow authority until that date. The Labour Party retained control of the council.

== Overall results ==
1996 Derby City Council Election
| Party | Seats | Gains | Losses | Net gain/loss | Seats % | Votes % | Votes | +/− |
|---|---|---|---|---|---|---|---|---|
| Labour | 39 | 9 | 0 | ▲9 | 88.6 | 55.5 | 33,386 | |
| Conservative | 3 | 0 | 9 | ▼9 | 6.8 | 27.6 | 16,593 | |
| Liberal Democrats | 2 | 0 | 0 | Steady | 4.5 | 16.1 | 9,716 | |
| Green | 0 | 0 | 0 | Steady | 0.0 | 0.6 | 385 | |
| Independent | 0 | 0 | 0 | Steady | 0.0 | 0.1 | 85 | |
| SDP | 0 | 0 | 0 | Steady | 0.0 | 0.1 | 36 | |
| Total | 44 | | | | | | 60,201 | |

== Ward results ==
=== Abbey ===
Location of Abbey ward

Abbey
| Party | Candidate | Votes | % |
|---|---|---|---|
| Labour | M. Fuller | 1,891 | |
| Labour | M. Walker | 1,752 | |
| Labour | J. Till | 1,725 | |
| Conservative | A. Beckworth | 478 | |
| Conservative | D. Sice | 353 | |
| Conservative | I. Sice | 349 | |
| Liberal Democrats | B. Harry | 253 | |
| Liberal Democrats | J. Keane | 248 | |
| Turnout | | | 25.6% |
| Labour hold | | | |
| Labour hold | | | |
| Labour hold | | | |

=== Allestree ===
Location of Allestree ward

Allestree
| Party | Candidate | Votes | % |
|---|---|---|---|
| Conservative | G. Du Sautoy | 1,838 | |
| Conservative | R. Webb | 1,734 | |
| Labour | J. Horobin | 1,087 | |
| Labour | W. Cotton | 1,043 | |
| Liberal Democrats | S. King | 413 | |
| Liberal Democrats | T. Hall | 314 | |
| Turnout | | | 42.6% |
| Conservative hold | | | |
| Conservative hold | | | |

=== Alvaston ===
Location of Alvaston ward

Alvaston
| Party | Candidate | Votes | % |
|---|---|---|---|
| Labour | J. Bayliss | 1,687 | |
| Labour | N. Wawman | 1,532 | |
| Conservative | G. Carran | 522 | |
| Conservative | I. Gray | 480 | |
| Liberal Democrats | D. Turner | 178 | |
| Liberal Democrats | P. Turner | 167 | |
| Turnout | | | 31.4% |
| Labour hold | | | |
| Labour gain from Conservative | | | |

=== Babington ===
Location of Babington ward

Babington
| Party | Candidate | Votes | % |
|---|---|---|---|
| Labour | F. Hussain | 1,203 | |
| Labour | A. Kalia | 1,160 | |
| Labour | V. Wilsoncroft | 1,096 | |
| Conservative | M. Hussain | 296 | |
| Conservative | A. Alam | 257 | |
| Conservative | J. Magee | 240 | |
| Liberal Democrats | M. Sherazi | 139 | |
| Liberal Democrats | M. Rashid | 131 | |
| Liberal Democrats | A. Savage | 130 | |
| Green | L. Davies | 95 | |
| Turnout | | | 30.6% |
| Labour hold | | | |
| Labour hold | | | |
| Labour hold | | | |

=== Blagreaves ===
Location of Blagreaves ward

Blagreaves
| Party | Candidate | Votes | % |
|---|---|---|---|
| Labour | M. Redfern | 1,703 | |
| Labour | M. Crosdale | 1,583 | |
| Liberal Democrats | A. Spendlove | 1,580 | |
| Liberal Democrats | E. Ashburner | 1,578 | |
| Conservative | K. Lester | 832 | |
| Conservative | P. McCandless | 736 | |
| Turnout | | | 49.7% |
| Labour hold | | | |
| Labour gain from Conservative | | | |

=== Boulton ===
Location of Boulton ward

Boulton
| Party | Candidate | Votes | % |
|---|---|---|---|
| Labour | R. Blanksby | 1,973 | |
| Labour | Hardyal Dhindsa | 1,647 | |
| Conservative | K. Thompson | 799 | |
| Conservative | E. Birkinshaw | 724 | |
| Liberal Democrats | P. Harlow | 361 | |
| Liberal Democrats | R. Skelton | 206 | |
| Independent | G. Hardy | 85 | |
| Turnout | | | 36.7% |
| Labour hold | | | |
| Labour gain from Conservative | | | |

=== Breadsall ===
Location of Breadsall ward

Breadsall
| Party | Candidate | Votes | % |
|---|---|---|---|
| Labour | P. Woodland | 3,139 | |
| Labour | J. Whitby | 2,321 | |
| Conservative | P. Latham | 1,862 | |
| Conservative | G. Shaw | 1,560 | |
| Liberal Democrats | M. Staines | 627 | |
| Turnout | | | 34.9% |
| Labour hold | | | |
| Labour gain from Conservative | | | |

=== Chaddesden ===
Location of Chaddesden ward

Chaddesden
| Party | Candidate | Votes | % |
|---|---|---|---|
| Labour | S. Bolton | 1,828 | |
| Labour | M. Repton | 1,677 | |
| Conservative | M. Kilminster | 764 | |
| Conservative | H. Johnson | 731 | |
| Liberal Democrats | L. Alcock | 355 | |
| Liberal Democrats | P. Whitaker | 230 | |
| Turnout | | | 36.3% |
| Labour hold | | | |
| Labour gain from Conservative | | | |

=== Chellaston ===
Location of Chellaston ward

Chellaston
| Party | Candidate | Votes | % |
|---|---|---|---|
| Labour | D. Whitehead | 1,877 | |
| Labour | B. Jackson | 1,852 | |
| Conservative | J. Jennings | 1,569 | |
| Conservative | M. Bertalan | 1,201 | |
| Liberal Democrats | J. Eaton | 175 | |
| Liberal Democrats | P. Kay | 158 | |
| Turnout | | | 40.3% |
| Labour hold | | | |
| Labour gain from Conservative | | | |

=== Darley ===
Location of Darley ward

Darley
| Party | Candidate | Votes | % |
|---|---|---|---|
| Labour | E. Wooley | 2,000 | |
| Labour | J. Bijoux | 1,990 | |
| Labour | P. Chadfield | 1,956 | |
| Conservative | J. Brittain | 1,654 | |
| Conservative | P. Hickson | 1,638 | |
| Conservative | C. Hulls | 1,570 | |
| Liberal Democrats | R. Jackson | 438 | |
| Liberal Democrats | M. McCann | 423 | |
| Liberal Democrats | G. Wood | 330 | |
| Turnout | | | 44.4% |
| Labour hold | | | |
| Labour gain from Conservative | | | |
| Labour gain from Conservative | | | |

=== Derwent ===
Location of Derwent ward

Derwent
| Party | Candidate | Votes | % |
|---|---|---|---|
| Labour | D. Hayes | 1,742 | |
| Labour | M. Young | 1,630 | |
| Conservative | G. Francis | 317 | |
| Conservative | C. Mellor | 302 | |
| Liberal Democrats | P. Robinson | 212 | |
| Turnout | | | 30.7% |
| Labour hold | | | |
| Labour hold | | | |

=== Kingsway ===
Location of Kingsway ward

Kingsway
| Party | Candidate | Votes | % |
|---|---|---|---|
| Labour | A. Graves | 1,376 | |
| Labour | K. Hill | 1,220 | |
| Conservative | N. Brown | 961 | |
| Conservative | B. Maw | 944 | |
| Liberal Democrats | A. Crosby | 750 | |
| Liberal Democrats | R. Troup | 521 | |
| Turnout | | | 40.0% |
| Labour hold | | | |
| Labour gain from Conservative | | | |

=== Litchurch ===
Location of Litchurch ward

Litchurch
| Party | Candidate | Votes | % |
|---|---|---|---|
| Labour | M. Akhtar | 1,221 | |
| Labour | A. Rehman | 1,147 | |
| Conservative | J. Alam | 429 | |
| Conservative | M. Hussain | 379 | |
| Green | J. Macdonald | 219 | |
| Liberal Democrats | A. Piggott | 175 | |
| Liberal Democrats | B. Sherazi | 93 | |
| Turnout | | | 28.5% |
| Labour hold | | | |
| Labour hold | | | |

=== Littleover ===
Location of Littleover ward

Littleover
| Party | Candidate | Votes | % |
|---|---|---|---|
| Liberal Democrats | L. Care | 2,065 | |
| Liberal Democrats | M. Burgess | 1,879 | |
| Labour | L. Shillingford | 779 | |
| Labour | M. Manku | 778 | |
| Conservative | A. Champion | 676 | |
| Conservative | B. Samra | 559 | |
| SDP | K. Dickenson | 36 | |
| Turnout | | | 50.9% |
| Liberal Democrats hold | | | |
| Liberal Democrats hold | | | |

=== Mackworth ===
Location of Mackworth ward

Mackworth
| Party | Candidate | Votes | % |
|---|---|---|---|
| Labour | R. Baxter | 1,649 | |
| Labour | R. Gerrard | 1,503 | |
| Conservative | J. Francis | 379 | |
| Conservative | J. Veitch | 347 | |
| Liberal Democrats | B. Benson | 216 | |
| Liberal Democrats | J. Benson | 166 | |
| Turnout | | | 36.5% |
| Labour hold | | | |
| Labour hold | | | |

=== Mickleover ===
Location of Mickleover ward

Mickleover
| Party | Candidate | Votes | % |
|---|---|---|---|
| Labour | P. Taylor | 1,596 | |
| Labour | A. Macdonald | 1,392 | |
| Conservative | A. Griffiths | 1,247 | |
| Conservative | R. Broadfield | 1,163 | |
| Liberal Democrats | J. Foxon | 470 | |
| Liberal Democrats | A. Wilbraham | 395 | |
| Turnout | | | 37.5% |
| Labour hold | | | |
| Labour gain from Conservative | | | |

=== Normanton ===
Location of Normanton ward

Normanton
| Party | Candidate | Votes | % |
|---|---|---|---|
| Labour | R. Jones | 1,554 | |
| Labour | Chris Williamson | 1,472 | |
| Conservative | A. Blackwood | 311 | |
| Conservative | J. Samra | 245 | |
| Liberal Democrats | A. Cooper | 235 | |
| Liberal Democrats | A. Hartropp | 206 | |
| Green | E. Wall | 71 | |
| Turnout | | | 32.2% |
| Labour hold | | | |
| Labour hold | | | |

=== Osmaston ===
Location of Osmaston ward

Osmaston
| Party | Candidate | Votes | % |
|---|---|---|---|
| Labour | R. Laxton | 1,017 | |
| Labour | J. McGiven | 878 | |
| Liberal Democrats | C. Goacher | 236 | |
| Liberal Democrats | I. Care | 193 | |
| Turnout | | | 22.5% |
| Labour hold | | | |
| Labour hold | | | |

=== Sinfin ===
Location of Sinfin ward

Sinfin
| Party | Candidate | Votes | % |
|---|---|---|---|
| Labour | A. Mullarkey | 1,765 | |
| Labour | A. Nath | 1,576 | |
| Conservative | H. Love | 231 | |
| Liberal Democrats | P. Gale | 208 | |
| Liberal Democrats | M. Platt | 203 | |
| Conservative | A. Wood | 174 | |
| Turnout | | | 29.4% |
| Labour hold | | | |
| Labour hold | | | |

=== Spondon ===
Location of Spondon ward

Spondon
| Party | Candidate | Votes | % |
|---|---|---|---|
| Labour | M. Byrne | 2,299 | |
| Labour | J. Athern | 1,906 | |
| Conservative | D. Black | 1,428 | |
| Labour | R. Turner | 1,410 | |
| Conservative | J. Lee | 1,347 | |
| Conservative | A. Pegg | 1,299 | |
| Liberal Democrats | P. Peat | 630 | |
| Liberal Democrats | J. Whitaker | 313 | |
| Turnout | | | 40.5% |
| Labour hold | | | |
| Labour hold | | | |
| Conservative hold | | | |
