= 1999 Derby City Council election =

1999 UK local government election

← 1998	7 May 1999	2000 →

15 of the 44 seats in the Derby City Council 23 seats needed for a majority
	First party	Second party	Third party
Party	Labour	Conservative	Liberal Democrats
Last election	37	4	3
Seats won	34	6	4
Seat change	▼3	▲2	▲1
Popular vote	18,371	11,840	7,753
Percentage	47.8%	30.8%	20.2%
- Map showing the results of the 1999 Derby City Council elections.
Council control before election
Labour
Council control after election
Labour

The 1999 Derby City Council election took place on 6 May 1999 to elect members of Derby City Council in England. One third of the council was up for election, and the Labour Party kept overall control of the council. Overall turnout was 29.0%.

After the election, the composition of the council was:

- Labour 34
- Conservative 6
- Liberal Democrat 4

== Election result ==
Derby local election result 1999
Party	Seats	Gains	Losses	Net gain/loss	Seats %	Votes %	Votes	+/−
Labour	10	0	3	▼3	66.7	47.8	18,371	
Conservative	3	2	0	▲2	20.0	30.8	11,840	
Liberal Democrats	2	1	0	▲1	13.3	20.2	7,753	

== Ward results ==
=== Abbey ===
Location of Abbey ward

Abbey
Party	Candidate	Votes	%
Labour	M. Walker	1,156	58.8%
Liberal Democrats	P. Clayden	365	18.6%
Conservative	H. Love	363	18.5%
Green	E. Wall	82	4.2%
Turnout			16.6%
Labour hold			

=== Allestree ===
Location of Allestree ward

Allestree
Party	Candidate	Votes	%
Conservative	G. Du Sautoy	1,738	61.3%
Labour	M. Daullah	613	21.6%
Liberal Democrats	S. King	486	17.1%
Turnout			35.3%
Conservative hold			

=== Alvaston ===
Location of Alvaston ward

Alvaston
Party	Candidate	Votes	%
Labour	J. Ayliss	1,128	60.8%
Conservative	Willitts P.	525	28.3%
Liberal Democrats	T. Hall	202	10.9%
Turnout			%
Labour hold			

=== Babington ===
Location of Babington ward

Babington
Party	Candidate	Votes	%
Labour	A. Kalia	940	43.7%
Conservative	M. Yaqub	891	41.4%
Liberal Democrats	M. Rashid	170	7.9%
Green	L. Davies	152	7.1%
Turnout			%
Labour hold			

=== Blagreaves ===
Location of Blagreaves ward

Blagreaves
Party	Candidate	Votes	%
Liberal Democrats	R. Troup	1,807	48.3%
Labour	M. Redfern	1,466	39.2%
Conservative	P. White	469	12.5%
Turnout			39.4%
Liberal Democrats gain from Labour			

=== Boulton ===
Location of Boulton ward

Boulton
Party	Candidate	Votes	%
Labour	R. Blanksby	1,432	60.5%
Conservative	S. Hart	554	23.4%
Independent Labour	S. Conway	200	8.4%
Liberal Democrats	M. Skelton	181	7.6%
Turnout			28.2%
Labour hold			

=== Breadsall ===
Location of Breadsall ward

Breadsall
Party	Candidate	Votes	%
Labour	P. Woodhead	1,866	51.6%
Conservative	M. Webb	1,428	39.5%
Liberal Democrats	P. Turner	321	8.9%
Turnout			22.9%
Labour hold			

=== Darley ===
Location of Darley ward

Darley
Party	Candidate	Votes	%
Conservative	P. Hickson	1,665	48.1%
Labour	D. Roberts	1,402	40.5%
Liberal Democrats	J. Keane	392	11.3%
Turnout			36.6%
Conservative gain from Labour			

=== Littleover ===
Location of Littleover ward

Littleover
Party	Candidate	Votes	%
Liberal Democrats	M. Burgess	1,746	58.6%
Labour	L. Shillingford	753	25.3%
Conservative	L. Skelton	479	16.1%
Turnout			41.3%
Liberal Democrats hold			

=== Mackworth ===
Location of Mackworth ward

Mackworth
Party	Candidate	Votes	%
Labour	R. Gerrard	1,276	68.7%
Conservative	W. Annable	408	22.0%
Liberal Democrats	W. Savage	174	9.4%
Turnout			29.6%
Labour hold			

=== Mickleover ===
Location of Mickleover ward

Mickleover
Party	Candidate	Votes	%
Conservative	M. Lindsay	1,085	34.1%
Labour	A. Macdonald	1,076	33.8%
Liberal Democrats	J. Foxon	1,025	32.2%
Turnout			34.1%
Conservative gain from Labour			

=== Normanton ===
Location of Normanton ward

Mickleover
Party	Candidate	Votes	%
Labour	Chris Williamson	1,292	69.2%
Conservative	J. Lee	297	15.9%
Liberal Democrats	B. Lowe	278	14.9%
Turnout			26.6%
Labour hold			

=== Osmaston ===
Location of Osmaston ward

Osmaston
Party	Candidate	Votes	%
Labour	J. McGiven	676	69.5%
Conservative	J. Magee	149	15.3%
Liberal Democrats	B. Harry	104	10.7%
Independent	G. Hardy	44	4.5%
Turnout			17.3%
Labour hold			

=== Sinfin ===
Location of Sinfin ward

Sinfin
Party	Candidate	Votes	%
Labour	A. Nath	1,529	77.7%
Conservative	D. Hart	260	13.2%
Liberal Democrats	A. Piggott	180	9.1%
Turnout			24.5%
Labour hold			

=== Spondon ===
Location of Spondon ward

Spondon
Party	Candidate	Votes	%
Labour	J. Ahern	1,766	48.8%
Conservative	M. Sandford	1,529	42.3%
Liberal Democrats	P. Peat	322	8.9%
Turnout			37.0%
Labour hold			
