= North Midlands Helicopter Support Unit =

Joint consortium established in 1998

The North Midlands Helicopter Support Unit was a joint consortium established in 1998 to provide police aviation for Derbyshire Constabulary and Nottinghamshire Police. It was managed by John Jameson and operated a Eurocopter EC135 from Derbyshire Constabulary's headquarters in Ripley, Derbyshire.

Operations of the unit were taken over by the National Police Air Service (NPAS) in 2013. NPAS closed the unit in early 2016.

== Aircraft ==
The first aircraft operated by the unit was G-NMHS, a Eurocopter AS355 Écureuil 2 'Twin Squirrel'. This aircraft served with the unit from 1998 to 2004 when it was replaced by G-NMID, a Eurocopter EC135 T2.

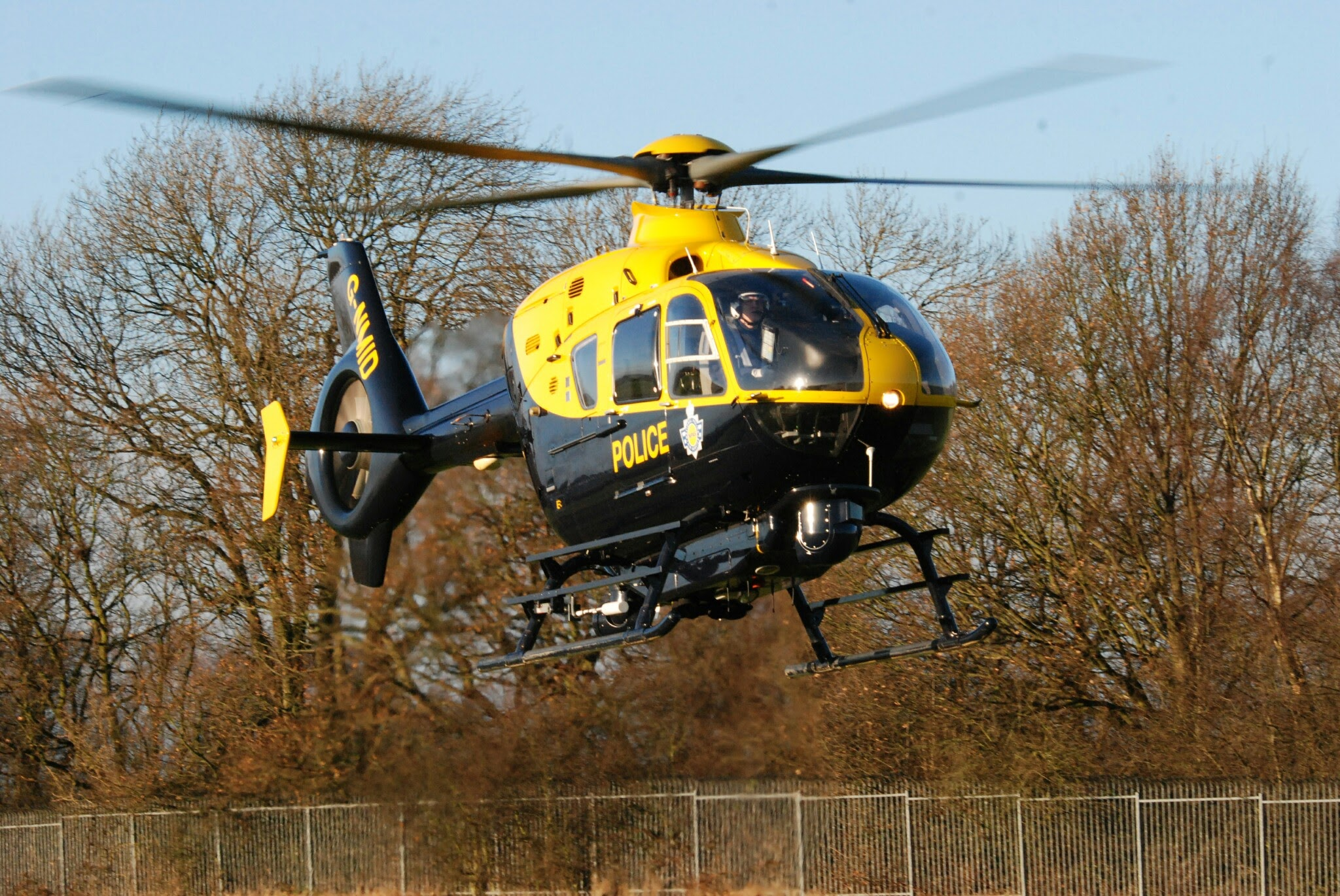
G-NMID landing at Ripley.

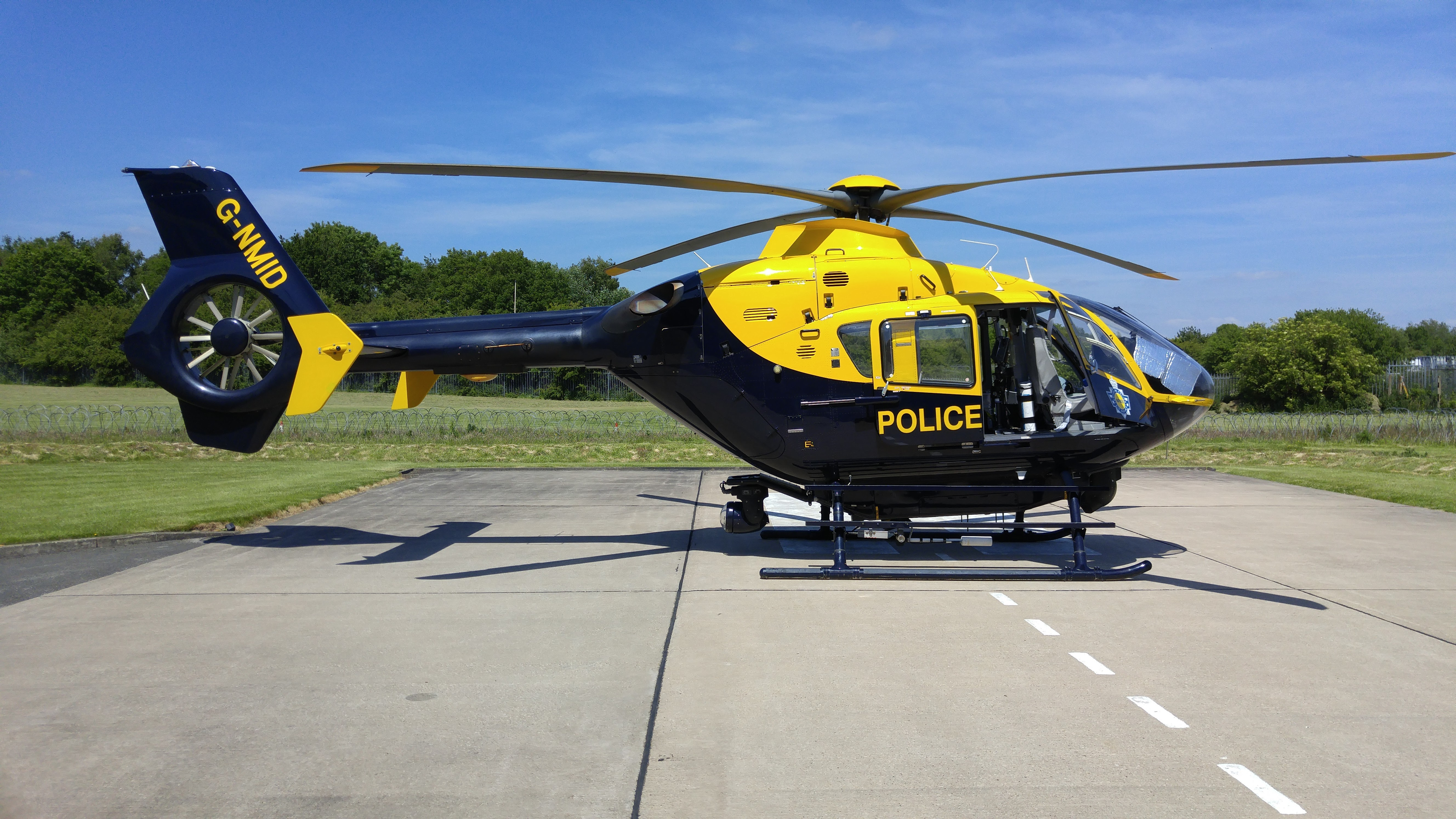
G-NMID at Ripley

Following the takeover of operations by NPAS G-NMID remained at the base until closure. It has since been refurbished and re-registered as G-POLD by NPAS.

== See also ==
- Police aviation
- Police aviation in the United Kingdom
