= 2003 Derby City Council election =

2003 UK local government election

2003 Derby Council election
← 2002	1 May 2003	2004 →

17 of 51 seats to Derby City Council 26 seats needed for a majority
	First party	Second party
Party	Labour	Liberal Democrats
Seats before	27	12
Seats won	7	6
Seats after	25	13
Seat change	▼2	▲1
Popular vote	18,586	18,234
Percentage	31.5%	30.9%
Swing	▼2	▲1
	Third party	Fourth party
Party	Conservative	Independent
Seats before	11	1
Seats won	5	1
Seats after	12	1
Seat change	▲1	Steady
Popular vote	18,039	4,113
Percentage	30.6%	7.0%
Swing	▲1	Steady
Council control before election
Labour
Council control after election
No overall control

The 2003 Derby City Council election took place on 1 May 2003 to elect members of Derby City Council in England. One third of the council was up for election and the Labour Party lost overall control of the council to no overall control.

After the election, the composition of the council was:

- Labour 25
- Liberal Democrat 13
- Conservative 12
- Independent 1

== Election result ==
2003 Derby local election result
Party	Seats	Gains	Losses	Net gain/loss	Seats %	Votes %	Votes	+/−
Labour	7	0	2	▼2	36.8	31.5	18,586	
Liberal Democrats	6	1	0	▲1	31.6	30.9	18,234	
Conservative	5	1	0	▲1	26.3	30.6	18,039	
Independent	1	0	0	Steady	5.3	7.0	4,113	

== Ward results ==
=== Abbey ===
Location of Abbey ward

Abbey
Party	Candidate	Votes	%
Liberal Democrats	Bryan Lowe	1,283	52.5
Labour	Michael Fuller	791	32.3
Conservative	David Hart	287	11.7
Independent	Ronald McKeown	85	3.5
Majority		492	20.2
Turnout		2,446	25.6
Liberal Democrats hold			

=== Allestree ===
Location of Allestree ward

Allestree
Party	Candidate	Votes	%
Conservative	Balbir Samra	2,132	50.7
Liberal Democrats	Roger Jackson	1,053	25.0
Labour	David Byrne	1,021	24.3
Majority		1,079	25.7
Turnout		4,206	39.1
Conservative hold			

=== Alvaston ===
Location of Alvaston ward

Alvaston
Party	Candidate	Votes	%
Labour	Christopher Wynn	1,231	47.5
Conservative	Adrian Pegg	536	20.7
Independent	Trevlyn Atkinson	417	16.1
Liberal Democrats	Cara Copestick	408	15.7
Majority		695	26.8
Turnout		2,592	25.0
Labour hold			

=== Arboretum ===
Location of Arboretum ward

Arboretum
Party	Candidate	Votes	%
Labour	Fareed Hussain	1,168	44.8
Liberal Democrats	Lloyd Newby	595	22.8
Conservative	Shayad Mahmood	535	20.5
Independent	Margaret Rooney	309	11.9
Majority		573	22.0
Turnout		2,607	26.1
Labour hold			

=== Blagreaves ===
Location of Blagreaves ward

Blagreaves
Party	Candidate	Votes	%
Liberal Democrats	Robert Troup	2,044	57.5
Labour	Stephen Melvin	911	25.6
Conservative	Janice Lee	537	15.1
Independent	Andries Olivier	61	1.7
Majority		1,133	31.9
Turnout		3,553	36.7
Liberal Democrats hold			

=== Boulton ===
Location of Boulton ward

Boulton
Party	Candidate	Votes	%
Independent	Ronald Allen	1,316	41.8
Labour	Mark Tittley	1,123	35.7
Conservative	Sean Conway	521	16.6
Liberal Democrats	Eric Ashburner	186	5.9
Majority		193	6.1
Turnout		3,146	31.3
Independent hold			

=== Chaddesden ===
Location of Chaddesten ward

Chaddesden
Party	Candidate	Votes	%
Labour	Anne MacDonald	1,475	49.2
Conservative	Vincent Mills	973	32.5
Liberal Democrats	Leslie Alcock	448	14.9
Independent	Brian Low	102	3.4
Majority		502	16.7
Turnout		2,998	29.6
Labour hold			

=== Chellaston (2 seats) ===
Location of Chellaston ward

Chellaston (2)
Party	Candidate	Votes	%
Conservative	Ronald Liversedge	1,393	
Conservative	Julie Hickson	1,274	
Labour	David Whitehead	1,189	
Labour	Alan Mullarkey	1,009	
Independent	David Black	572	
Independent	Julia Slater	396	
Liberal Democrats	Christine Yates	290	
Liberal Democrats	Harjinder Naitta	195	
Turnout		6,318	34.2
Conservative hold			
Conservative gain from Labour			

=== Darley ===
Location of Darley ward

Darley
Party	Candidate	Votes	%
Liberal Democrats	Joan Travis	1,406	41.9
Labour	Michael Futers	973	29.0
Conservative	Graham Else	876	26.1
Independent	Graham Leeming	101	3.0
Majority		433	12.9
Turnout		3,356	34.6
Liberal Democrats gain from Labour			

=== Derwent ===
Location of Derwent ward

Derwent
Party	Candidate	Votes	%
Labour	Suman Gupta	853	43.0
Conservative	Franklyn Harwood	719	36.2
Liberal Democrats	Rafe Nauen	233	11.7
Independent	Mark Bull	179	9.0
Majority		134	6.8
Turnout		1,984	20.7
Labour hold			

=== Littleover ===
Location of Littleover ward

Littleover
Party	Candidate	Votes	%
Liberal Democrats	Michael Carr	2,298	64.4
Conservative	Mark Collins	803	22.5
Labour	Peter Blount	468	13.1
Majority		1,495	41.9
Turnout		3,569	37.5
Liberal Democrats hold			

=== Mackworth ===
Location of Mackworth ward

Mackworth
Party	Candidate	Votes	%
Labour	Veronica Wilsoncroft	1,104	47.5
Conservative	Elizabeth Waters	742	31.9
Liberal Democrats	Lorraine Brown	479	20.6
Majority		362	15.6
Turnout		2,325	23.9
Labour hold			

=== Mickleover ===
Location of Mickleover ward

Mickleover (2)
Party	Candidate	Votes	%
Liberal Democrats	Margaret Hird	2,558	
Liberal Democrats	Marilyn Winter	2,516	
Conservative	Virginia Lemmings	1,468	
Conservative	Christine Pearn	1,449	
Labour	Lisa Higginbottom	536	
Labour	Keith Normington	427	
Independent	Ivor Cox	96	
Turnout		9,050	42.4
Liberal Democrats hold			
Liberal Democrats hold			

=== Normanton ===
Location of Normanton ward

Normanton
Party	Candidate	Votes	%
Labour	Amar Nath	1,351	47.6
Liberal Democrats	Sean Marshall	1,092	38.5
Conservative	Joan Magee	306	10.8
Independent	Richard Bull	89	3.1
Majority		259	9.1
Turnout		2,838	28.9
Labour hold			

=== Oakwood ===
Location of Oakwood ward

Oakwood
Party	Candidate	Votes	%
Conservative	Paul West	1,408	52.1
Labour	Phillip Woodhead	900	33.3
Liberal Democrats	Philip Clayden	392	14.5
Majority		508	18.8
Turnout		2,700	27.0
Conservative hold			

=== Sinfin ===
Location of Sinfin ward

Sinfin
Party	Candidate	Votes	%
Labour	Prem Chera	1,049	53.7
Liberal Democrats	Leigh Alcock	367	18.8
Conservative	Richard Pearn	282	14.4
Independent	Mario Colella	165	8.4
Independent	Dorothy Skrytek	90	4.6
Majority		682	34.9
Turnout		1,953	20.6
Labour hold			

=== Spondon ===
Location of Spondon ward

Spondon
Party	Candidate	Votes	%
Conservative	Peter Berry	1,798	54.0
Labour	Frank Kirkland	1,007	30.2
Liberal Democrats	Patrick Peat	391	11.7
Independent	William Peake	135	4.1
Majority		791	23.8
Turnout		3,331	35.1
Conservative hold			
