= 2000 Derby City Council election =

2000 UK local government election

← 1999	5 May 2000	2002 →

15 of the 44 seats in the Derby City Council 23 seats needed for a majority
	First party	Second party	Third party
Party	Labour	Conservative	Liberal Democrats
Last election	34	6	4
Seats won	29	9	6
Seat change	▼5	▲3	▲2
Popular vote	14,205	11,761	7,443
Percentage	42.5%	35.2%	22.3%
- Map showing the results of the 2000 Derby City Council elections.
Council control before election
Labour
Council control after election
Labour

The 2000 Derby City Council election took place on 4 May 2000 to elect members of Derby City Council in England. One third of the council was up for election and the Labour Party kept overall control of the council.

After the election, the composition of the council was:

- Labour 29
- Conservative 9
- Liberal Democrat 6

== Election result ==
2000 Derby local election result
Party	Seats	Gains	Losses	Net gain/loss	Seats %	Votes %	Votes	+/−
Labour	9	0	5	▼5	60.0	42.5	14,205	
Conservative	3	3	0	▲3	20.0	35.2	11,761	
Liberal Democrats	3	2	0	▲2	20.0	22.3	7,443	

== Ward results ==
=== Abbey ===
Location of Abbey ward

Abbey
Party	Candidate	Votes	%
Labour	M. Fuller	906	54.4%
Conservative	H. Love	422	25.3%
Liberal Democrats	P. Clayden	338	20.3%
Turnout			14.8%
Labour hold			

=== Babington ===
Location of Babington ward

Babington
Party	Candidate	Votes	%
Labour	A. Hussain	1,235	64.3%
Conservative	J. Iqbal	491	25.6%
Liberal Democrats	D. Mensah	194	10.1%
Turnout			26.8%
Labour hold			

=== Chaddesden ===
Location of Chaddesden ward

Chaddesden
Party	Candidate	Votes	%
Labour	S. Bolton	1,107	50.1%
Conservative	J. Veitch	891	40.4%
Liberal Democrats	B. Harry	210	9.5%
Turnout			27.5%
Labour hold			

=== Chellaston ===
Location of Chellaston ward

Chellaston
Party	Candidate	Votes	%
Conservative	D. Black	1,635	49.9%
Labour	D. Whitehead	1,396	42.6%
Liberal Democrats	E. Ashburner	244	7.5%
Turnout			32.2%
Conservative gain from Labour			

=== Darley ===
Location of Darley ward

Darley
Party	Candidate	Votes	%
Conservative	J. Leatherbarrow	1,796	51.0%
Labour	E. Wooley	1,316	37.4%
Liberal Democrats	S. King	410	11.6%
Turnout			37.7%
Conservative gain from Labour			

=== Derwent ===
Location of Derwent ward

Derwent
Party	Candidate	Votes	%
Labour	D. Roberts	771	59.6%
Conservative	P. West	365	28.2%
Liberal Democrats	J-P. Keane	157	12.1%
Turnout			17.6%
Labour hold			

=== Kingsway ===
Location of Kingsway ward

Kingsway
Party	Candidate	Votes	%
Liberal Democrats	A. Hanson	1,439	50.6%
Conservative	B. Maw	776	27.3%
Labour	A. Graves	628	22.1%
Turnout			36.4%
Liberal Democrats gain from Labour			

=== Litchurch ===
Location of Litchurch ward

Litchurch
Party	Candidate	Votes	%
Labour	M. Akhtar	877	66.2%
Conservative	J. Magee	323	24.4%
Liberal Democrats	A. Savage	125	9.4%
Turnout			18.5%
Labour hold			

=== Littleover ===
Location of Littleover ward

Littleover
Party	Candidate	Votes	%
Liberal Democrats	L. Care	1,736	62.0%
Conservative	C. Charlesworth	559	20.0%
Labour	H. Malcolm-Walker	504	18.0%
Turnout			39.0%
Liberal Democrats hold			

=== Mackworth ===
Location of Mackworth ward

Mackworth
Party	Candidate	Votes	%
Labour	R. Baxter	853	55.0%
Conservative	S. Hart	542	34.9%
Liberal Democrats	A. Dark	157	10.1%
Turnout			24.9%
Labour hold			

=== Mickleover ===
Location of Mickleover ward

Mickleover
Party	Candidate	Votes	%
Liberal Democrats	H. Jones	1,544	43.2%
Conservative	R. Wood	1,239	34.7%
Labour	P. Taylor	788	22.1%
Turnout			38.3%
Liberal Democrats gain from Labour			

=== Normanton ===
Location of Normanton ward

Normanton
Party	Candidate	Votes	%
Labour	R. Jones	835	55.8%
Conservative	J. Lee	396	26.5%
Liberal Democrats	B. Lowe	266	17.8%
Turnout			21.7%
Labour hold			

=== Osmaston ===
Location of Osmaston ward

Osmaston
Party	Candidate	Votes	%
Labour	R. Turner	514	58.8%
Conservative	A. Javed	195	22.3%
Liberal Democrats	L. Alcock	165	18.9%
Turnout			%
Labour hold			

=== Sinfin ===
Location of Sinfin ward

Sinfin
Party	Candidate	Votes	%
Labour	A. Mullarkey	1,132	70.0%
Conservative	T. Hart	328	20.3%
Liberal Democrats	M. Skelton	156	9.7%
Turnout			20.2%
Labour hold			

=== Spondon ===
Location of Spondon ward

Spondon
Party	Candidate	Votes	%
Conservative	E. Berry	1,803	52.3%
Labour	M. Byrne	1,343	39.0%
Liberal Democrats	P. Peat	302	8.8%
Turnout			35.7%
Conservative gain from Labour			
