= Angelique Foster =

British politician

Derbyshire Police and Crime Commissioner
- In office 13 May 2021 – 8 May 2024
- Preceded by: Hardyal Dhindsa
- Succeeded by: Nicolle Ndiweni

Derbyshire County councillor for the Dronfield & West Walton ward
- In office 5 May 2017 – 7 May 2021

Personal details
- Citizenship: British
- Party: Conservative

Angelique Foster is a British politician who was elected Derbyshire Police and Crime Commissioner in 2021.

== Early life ==
Foster is originally from France.

== Political career ==
Foster was a member of Derbyshire County Council for the Dronfield West and Walton ward prior to her election as PCC, elected at the 2017 Derbyshire County Council election. She was elected to the police and crime commissioner post in May 2021, defeating Labour incumbent Hardyal Dhindsa.

Foster, was the leader of Dronfield Town Council for 9 years before stepping down in 2024, she was also a District Councillor for Dronfield South from 2011 to 2023.

Foster was Derbyshire PCC until the 2024 election when she was replaced by the Labour candidate Nicolle Ndiweni.

She is a candidate in the 2025 Derbyshire County Council election in Dronfield Woodhouse & Walton ward.
