= Doug Hayward =

British bespoke tailor (1934–2008)

- Born: Douglas Frederick Cornelius Hayward; 5 October 1934; Kensington, West London, England
- Died: 26 April 2008 (aged 73)
- Occupations: Fashion designer; bespoke tailor

Douglas Frederick Cornelius Hayward (5 October 1934 – 26 April 2008), was an English fashion designer and bespoke tailor, who dressed many famous people during the 1960s. The inspiration for customer Michael Caine's characterisation of his role in the 1966 film Alfie, he was also the model for client John le Carré's Harry Pendel, aka The Tailor of Panama.

== Early life ==
Born to working-class parents in Kensington, West London, Hayward and his brother grew up in Hayes. His father cleaned heating boilers for the BBC and worked a second job cleaning buses in Uxbridge; while his mother worked during World War II in a munitions factory. Hayward won a scholarship to Southall Grammar School. He had a trial at inside-left for the Middlesex county football team, but lost out to Johnny Haynes, who was also a left footer.

== Career ==
Hayward left school at 15, looking for a white-collar job:

We didn't have a careers master, but I found a booklet which listed possible occupations. I went down the list and when I got to T for tailor, I thought: "I don't know any tailors. I can't ever be judged as being a bad or a good one, so I'll be a tailor."

He was apprenticed to a Shepherd's Bush Green tailor who visited the flats in Cadogan Square, where his uncle was a caretaker. During this period, he worked a summer in Clacton-on-Sea as a Butlins Redcoat, and after finishing his apprenticeship served his National Service in the Royal Navy, an experience he later admitted got him focused.

Returning to civilian life, he continued working for his original employer, but also started after hours work on his own creations. Early clients like Peter Sellers, Terence Stamp and lyricist Herbert Kretzmer, came through his excellent theatrical links at the local theatre, the BBC's Lime Grove Studios, or through his first wife, Diana, sister-in-law of film director Basil Dearden.

Unable to gain a cutters job on either Savile Row or even Oxford Street due to his Cockney accent, Hayward then joined fellow showbiz specialist tailor Dimitrio Major, based in Fulham. It was here that he developed a service mentality, driving his Mini Countryman estate car to allow him to attend customers wherever required, including Richard Burton at the Dorchester Hotel.

Hayward first set up on his own operating out of a small room in London's Pall Mall, before moving in 1966 to 95 Mount Street in Mayfair; there, he lived above the shop, which soon became a club for his famous clients. In the rear was the cutting room, overlooking Mount Street Gardens.

His weekend home was on the Oxfordshire estate of client and friend Lord Hambleden, near Henley on Thames; Described by many as being like a gentlemen's club, the shop acted as a hub for all of Hayward's clients when they were in London. Tea or something stronger was often served and the coffee table was littered with autographed copies of books written by writer clients, including Joseph Heller, author of Catch-22, Hayward's favourite book. There was also a collection of teddy bears, a gift from his client Ralph Lauren, whose later Purple Label line was inspired and advised by Hayward. but Hayward's best pal was his Jack Russell terrier Burt, who had his own made-to-measure suits. Client Michael Parkinson said of the shop:

Hayward ran the best salon in London. Anybody who's anybody was there. It soon became apparent in the 1970s that everyone that was in town to do the show would visit there. I met Alec Guinness there and Tony Bennett. He had this great ability to treat everybody the same.

Hayward's client list included: actors Clint Eastwood, Sir John Gielgud, Michael Caine, Terence Stamp, Ray Austin; film director Rex Harrison, Steve McQueen and John Osborne; actor Tommy Steele; singer Tony Bennett; newsreader Tom Brokaw; footballer and 1966 World Cup England captain Bobby Moore; Formula 1 world champion Sir Jackie Stewart; and businessmen Lord Hanson and Mark Birley. Female clients included Faye Dunaway, Mia Farrow, Jean Shrimpton and Sharon Tate. His design of suits for singer Mick Jagger lead him to designing the wedding suit for Bianca Jagger, and later many of her iconic white jumpsuits. His film credits included Caine's suits in The Italian Job, and Roger Moore in James Bond. Actor James Coburn called Hayward "the Rodin of tweed". Many of his clients became close friends. An early friend was Ralph Lauren, who met Dougie in the early 1980s on one of his first visits to London. Ralph realized that Hayward's approach to his clients, and their corresponding support of his style and tailoring, was very similar to his own and exactly what he envisioned for his eventual entry into the London market. Dougie recognized Ralph's ideas and talent and became a great friend and supporter. In his approach to his clientele as a complete source of style, Hayward sold hand-made shoes, and his own line of watches and leather luggage. He lectured at the Royal College of Art on tailoring, placing emphasis on cutting: "You can't do anything unless you can cut." Pragmatic and undemanding of his clients body, Hayward believed that any one could be made to look sleeker:

People always wanted to know who had been the tailor to Cary Grant or Fred Astaire. But what I'd want to know is who was Sydney Greenstreet's tailor? He was a large man in The Maltese Falcon and Casablanca, who always looked good.

Every week until her death in 1984, he visited his mother, Winifred. Each time he would present her with a £1 note, to pay for her Meals on Wheels. He also gave her regular sums of money, always in cash. Convinced that her son was running either a brothel or a game of chemmy, she kept it all. After her death, the family found it beneath her bed in 15 empty ice cream boxes, with a note: "This money is to get Doug out of prison when they finally get him."

== Media influence ==
Hayward provided the real-life inspiration for his friend Michael Caine's most iconic screen role, serial philanderer Alfie Elkins. He was also the model for client John le Carré's Harry Pendel, aka The Tailor of Panama.

== Personal life ==
Married twice, his first wife was Diana, sister-in-law of film director Basil Dearden. His second was journalist Glenys Roberts, with whom he had a daughter Polly, who later became his business partner. Roberts divorced Hayward in 1978. Hayward was so charming many women claimed to be his lovers. In 1973 he made a full-length double cashmere coat for Janet Street Porter.

Hayward had a lifelong love for football. A boyhood fan of both of Fulham and Arsenal, although on Saturdays after lunch on the King's Road he would head to Stamford Bridge to watch Chelsea. Hayward had his own team, the Mount Street Marchers and Social Club. The amateur team played in arranged matches on Hyde Park on Sunday mornings, whom he talked clients and actors Richard Harris and Tom Courtenay, and occasionally Bobby Moore, into appearing for. In 1970 he persuaded the Rank Organisation to pay for his team to fly to Mexico for the 1970 World Cup. Believing that they were going to get an exclusive documentary about the England team, Rank were presented with footage of Hayward enjoying himself against local park sides.

Every Thursday, he would lunch at Harrys Bar with friends: photographer Terry O'Neill, hair expert Philip Kingsley, the owner of Tramp nightclub Johnny Gold and Michael Caine. The four of them made up the Mayfair Orphans' Club. His friendship with the Queen's cousin, Patrick Anson, 5th Earl of Lichfield, led to them founding dining club Burkes. Invited to Lichfield's home on the Caribbean island of Mustique, Hayward struck up a friendship with Princess Margaret, where the pair performed Cole Porter songs.

Hayward suffered a fall in 1996, and there followed a long period of ill health, before his death brought on by vascular dementia. Hayward died in a London hospice. A lifelong agnostic, Hayward received the last rites from a Roman Catholic priest before his death, on which his daughter and business partner, Polly, commented: "Typical jammy bastard—gets forgiven all his sins right at the end."

== Filmography ==
Year	Title	Role	Notes
1966	Modesty Blaise	Costumes/wardrobe	Costumes for Terence Stamp
1966	The Spy with a Cold Nose	Costumes/wardrobe	Costumes for Laurence Harvey
1968	Assignment K	Costumes/wardrobe	Costumes for Stephen Boyd
1968	Boom!	Costumes/wardrobe	Costume for Noël Coward
1968	Salt and Pepper	Costumes/wardrobe	Costumes for Peter Lawford
1969	The Italian Job	Costumes/wardrobe	Costumes for Michael Caine; No on-screen credit
1970	The Reckoning	Costume designer	Credited as 'Costume designer' in some versions of the film; Costumes for Nicol Williamson
1970	One More Time	Costumes/wardrobe	Costumes for Peter Lawford
1978	Dominique	Costumes/wardrobe	Men's costumes
1978	The Stud	Costumes/wardrobe	Costumes for Oliver Tobias
1997	The Aristocracy	Self	Episode: "Survival of the Fittest: 1970–1997"; BBC documentary series
1998	The Man Who Would Be Caine	Self	TV documentary
