= Derbyshire Police and Crime Commissioner =

- Incumbent; Nicolle Ndiweni since 9 May 2024
- Police and crime commissioner of Derbyshire Police
- Reports to: Derbyshire Police and Crime Panel
- Appointer: Electorate of Derby and Derbyshire
- Term length: Four years
- Constituting instrument: Police Reform and Social Responsibility Act 2011
- Precursor: Derbyshire Police Authority
- Inaugural holder: Alan Charles
- Formation: November 2012
- Deputy: Deputy Police and Crime Commissioner
- Salary: £76,500
- Website: www.derbyshire-pcc.gov.uk

The Derbyshire Police and Crime Commissioner is the police and crime commissioner, an elected official tasked with setting out the way crime is tackled by Derbyshire Police in the English county of Derbyshire. The post was created in November 2012 after an election held on 15 November 2012; it replaced the Derbyshire Police Authority. The current incumbent is Nicolle Ndiweni, who represents the Labour Party.

== List of Derbyshire Police and Crime Commissioners ==
Name	Political party	From	To
Alan Charles	Labour	22 November 2012	11 May 2016
Hardyal Dhindsa	Labour	12 May 2016	12 May 2021
Angelique Foster	Conservative	13 May 2021	8 May 2024
Nicolle Ndiweni	Labour	9 May 2024	Incumbent

== Elections ==
Derbyshire Police and Crime Commissioner election, 2024
Party	Candidate	Votes	%	±%
Labour Co-op	Nicolle Ndiweni	93,260		
Conservative	Angelique Foster	65,293		
Reform	Russell Armstrong	32,944		
Liberal Democrats	David Hancock	22,540		
