= Around Whicker's World =

1998 British radio program

Around Whicker's World is a short-lived radio program that aired from March 1998 – April 1998. There were six half-hour episodes and it was broadcast on BBC Radio 2. It starred Alan Whicker.

== Notes and references ==
Lavalie, John. Around Whicker's World. EpGuides. 21 Jul 2005. 29 Jul 2005
