= Nicolle Ndiweni =

Elected politician (born 1989)

Derbyshire Police and Crime Commissioner
- Incumbent
- Assumed office 4 May 2024
- Preceded by: Angelique Foster

Personal details
- Party: Labour
- Website: Nicolle Ndiweni

Nicolle Ndiweni-Roberts (born 5 March 1989 in Bulawayo, Zimbabwe) was elected as the Derbyshire Police and Crime Commissioner in the 2024 England and Wales police and crime commissioner elections representing the Labour Party. She defeated Angelique Foster of the Conservative Party, the incumbent since 2021.

Ndiweni-Roberts now serves as one of the APCC Joint Leads for Economic and Cyber Crime. Their portfolio focuses on addressing critical issues such as online safety, harassment, fraud, hacking and economic crime.

Ndiweni-Roberts holds a degree in Criminology and International Relations from the University of Lincoln. Prior to her role as PCC, she worked as a Business Expansion specialist in Inward Investment. She is a Vice Chair and Women's Representative on Labour's East Midlands Regional Board, and a former East Midlands Representative on Labour’s National Policy Forum.

Ndiweni-Roberts is also a Member of the Nova Education Trust, and sits on the East Midlands Cyber Resilience Centre board, contributing to efforts in strengthening the region's cybersecurity infrastructure, education and support for individuals, schools and businesses.

Ndiweni-Roberts had previously been a District Councillor on Ashfield District Council for the Hucknall Central Ward and served as a Cabinet Member for the Safer and Stronger Communities portfolio from 2015-2019 before losing her seat to the Ashfield Independents. She was also one of Labour's five candidates in the East Midlands for the 2019 European Parliament election.
