= Hardyal Dhindsa =

British politician

Hardyal Singh Dhindsa
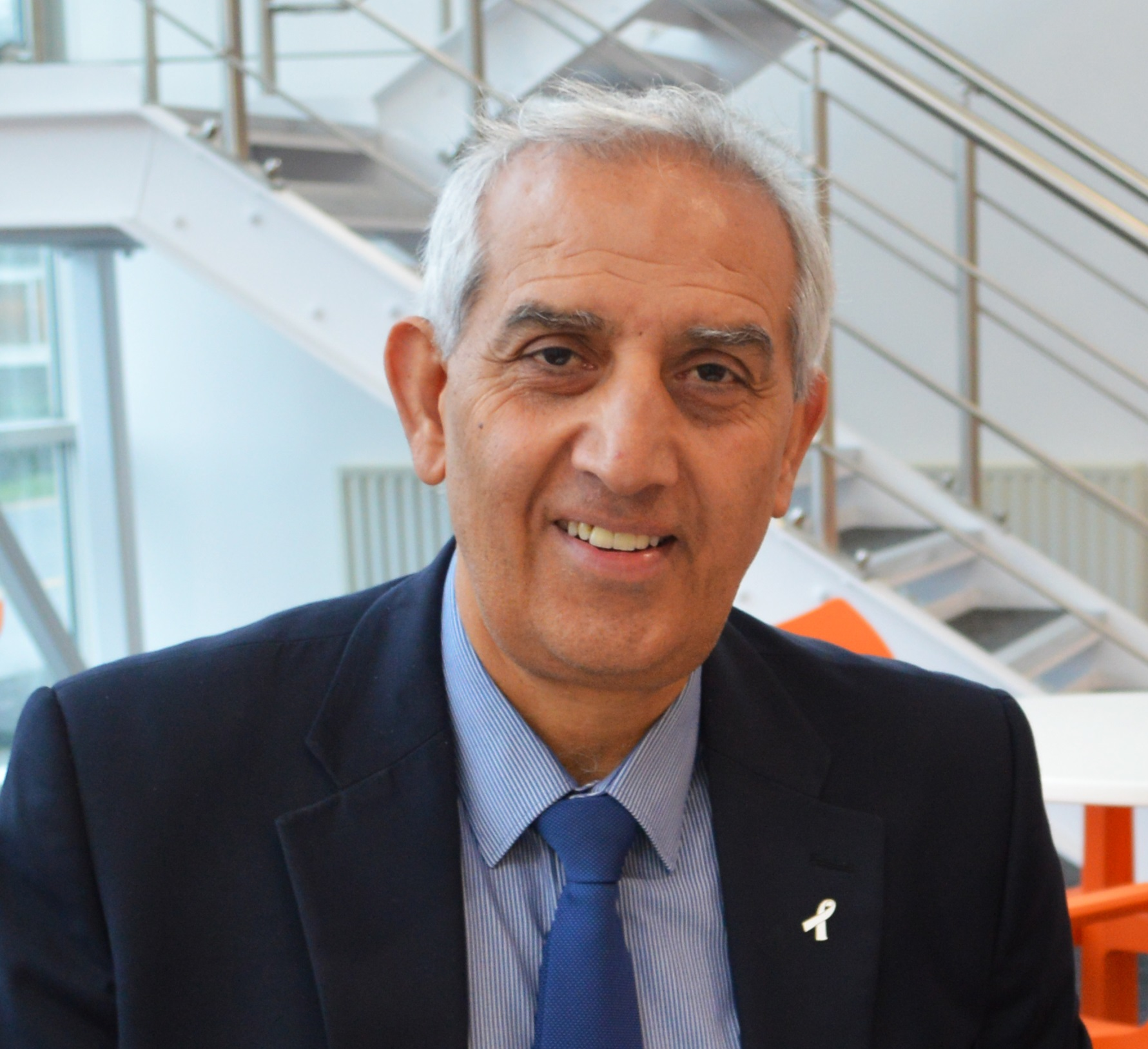

Derbyshire Police and Crime Commissioner
- In office 12 May 2016 – 12 May 2021
- Preceded by: Alan Charles
- Succeeded by: Angelique Foster

Member of Derby City Council for Blagreaves Normanton (2004-2023) Boulton (1996-2002)
- Incumbent
- Assumed office 9 May 2023
- In office 10 June 2004 – 8 May 2023
- In office 2 June 1996 – 2 May 2002

Personal details
- Born: February 1956 (age 70)
- Party: Labour

Hardyal Dhindsa (born February 1956) is a British politician, and the former Police and Crime Commissioner for Derbyshire, representing the Labour Party. He was elected to the post on 5 May 2016, succeeding the previous incumbent, Alan Charles. He was defeated by the Conservative Party candidate Angelique Foster in the 2021 election.

== Election history ==
2010 general election: Mid Derbyshire
Party	Candidate	Votes	%	±%
Conservative	Pauline Latham	22,877	48.3	+1.1
Labour	Hardyal Dhindsa	11,585	24.5	−10.2
Liberal Democrats	Sally McIntosh	9,711	20.5	+4.5
BNP	Lewis Allsebrook	1,698	3.6	New
UKIP	Anthony Kay	1,252	2.6	+0.5
Monster Raving Loony	R.U.Seerius	219	0.5	New
Majority		11,292	23.8	+11.3
Turnout		47,342	71.4	+4.9
Conservative hold		Swing	+5.65	
