= 1990 Derby City Council election =

1990 UK local government election

| ← 1988 | 3 May 1990 | 1991 → |

16 of the 44 seats in the Derby City Council 23 seats needed for a majority
| | First party | Second party |
|---|---|---|
| Party | Conservative | Labour |
| Last election | 24 | 20 |
| Seats won | 6 | 10 |
| Seats after | 24 | 20 |
| Seat change | Steady | Steady |
| Popular vote | 28,155 | 32,742 |
| Percentage | 40.7% | 47.4% |
- Map showing the results of the 1990 Derby City Council elections.
Council control before election
Conservative
Council control after election
Conservative

The 1990 Derby City Council election took place on 3 May 1990 to elect members of Derby City Council in England. Local elections were held in the United Kingdom in 1990. This was on the same day as other local elections. 16 of the council's 44 seats were up for election. The Conservative Party retained control of the council.

== Overall results ==
1990 Derby City Council Election
| Party | Seats | Gains | Losses | Net gain/loss | Seats % | Votes % | Votes | +/− |
|---|---|---|---|---|---|---|---|---|
| Labour | 9 | 0 | 0 | Steady | 62.5 | 47.4 | 32,742 | |
| Conservative | 6 | 0 | 0 | Steady | 37.5 | 40.7 | 28,155 | |
| Liberal Democrats | 0 | 0 | 0 | Steady | 0.0 | 9.1 | 6,321 | |
| Green | 0 | 0 | 0 | Steady | 0.0 | 1.8 | 1,261 | |
| ISLAM | 0 | 0 | 0 | Steady | 0.0 | 0.5 | 316 | |
| Independent Labour | 0 | 0 | 0 | Steady | 0.0 | 0.3 | 205 | |
| Independent | 0 | 0 | 0 | Steady | 0.0 | 0.1 | 103 | |
| Total | 15 | | | | | | 69,103 | |

== Ward results ==
=== Abbey ===
Location of Abbey ward

Abbey
| Party | Candidate | Votes | % |
|---|---|---|---|
| Labour | M. Walker | 2,596 | 62.1% |
| Conservative | G. Shaw | 1,125 | 26.9% |
| Liberal Democrats | C. Harris | 236 | 5.6% |
| Green | P. Brock | 226 | 5.4% |
| Turnout | | | 46.1% |
| Labour hold | | | |

=== Allestree ===
Location of Allestree ward

Allestree
| Party | Candidate | Votes | % |
|---|---|---|---|
| Conservative | G. Du Sautoy | 3,177 | 67.7% |
| Labour | W. Gowing | 1,017 | 21.7% |
| Liberal Democrats | H. Jones | 498 | 10.6% |
| Turnout | | | 58.0% |
| Conservative hold | | | |

=== Alvaston ===
Location of Alvaston ward

Alvaston
| Party | Candidate | Votes | % |
|---|---|---|---|
| Labour | C. Thrower | 1,962 | 47.7% |
| Conservative | K. Webley | 1,492 | 36.3% |
| Liberal Democrats | J. Western | 657 | 16.0% |
| Turnout | | | 50.0% |
| Labour hold | | | |

=== Babington ===
Location of Babington ward

Babington
| Party | Candidate | Votes | % |
|---|---|---|---|
| Labour | V. Wilsoncroft | 2,152 | 62.8% |
| Conservative | M. Ali | 532 | 15.5% |
| ISLAM | G. Khan | 316 | 9.2% |
| Liberal Democrats | S. Hartropp | 273 | 8.0% |
| Green | B. Emmans | 152 | 4.4% |
| Turnout | | | 45.5% |
| Labour hold | | | |

=== Blagreaves ===
Location of Blagreaves ward

Blagreaves
| Party | Candidate | Votes | % |
|---|---|---|---|
| Conservative | J. Keith | 2,391 | 49.3% |
| Labour | J. Groves | 1,946 | 40.2% |
| Liberal Democrats | P. Turner | 509 | 10.5% |
| Turnout | | | 60.0% |
| Conservative hold | | | |

=== Boulton ===
Location of Boulton ward

Boulton
| Party | Candidate | Votes | % |
|---|---|---|---|
| Labour | A. Kennedy | 2,367 | 47.7% |
| Conservative | C. Gadsby | 1,787 | 36.0% |
| Liberal Democrats | P. Harlow | 626 | 12.6% |
| Green | C. Cooper | 181 | 3.6% |
| Turnout | | | 53.0% |
| Labour hold | | | |

=== Breadsall ===
Location of Breadsall ward

Breadsall
| Party | Candidate | Votes | % |
|---|---|---|---|
| Labour | E. Ward | 3,491 | 50.1% |
| Conservative | M. Bishop | 2,932 | 42.1% |
| Liberal Democrats | M. McCann | 549 | 7.9% |
| Turnout | | | 52.8% |
| Labour hold | | | |

=== Darley ===
Location of Darley ward

Darley
| Party | Candidate | Votes | % |
|---|---|---|---|
| Conservative | S. Hart | 2,873 | 56.1% |
| Labour | C. Wynn | 1,676 | 32.7% |
| Liberal Democrats | W. Webley | 375 | 7.3% |
| Green | L. Ludkiewicz | 199 | 3.9% |
| Turnout | | | 54.3% |
| Conservative hold | | | |

=== Litchurch ===
Location of Litchurch ward

Littleover
| Party | Candidate | Votes | % |
|---|---|---|---|
| Labour | A. Rehman | 1,943 | 65.7% |
| Conservative | M. Najeeb | 622 | 21.0% |
| Liberal Democrats | R. Jackson | 291 | 9.8% |
| Independent | L. Brown | 103 | 3.5% |
| Turnout | | | 39.3% |
| Labour hold | | | |

=== Littleover ===
Location of Littleover ward

Littleover
| Party | Candidate | Votes | % |
|---|---|---|---|
| Conservative | B. Wayne | 2,186 | 52.5% |
| Liberal Democrats | J. Till | 1,525 | 36.6% |
| Labour | M. Burgess | 451 | 10.8% |
| Turnout | | | 57.7% |
| Conservative hold | | | |

=== Mackworth ===
Location of Mackworth ward

Mackworth
| Party | Candidate | Votes | % |
|---|---|---|---|
| Labour | R. Baxter | 2,326 | 63.4% |
| Conservative | G. Tatlow | 1,105 | 30.1% |
| Liberal Democrats | H. Holbrook | 239 | 6.5% |
| Turnout | | | 52.2% |
| Labour hold | | | |

=== Mickleover ===
Location of Mickleover ward

Mickleover
| Party | Candidate | Votes | % |
|---|---|---|---|
| Conservative | N. Keene | 2,609 | 57.5% |
| Labour | M. McReynolds | 1,333 | 29.4% |
| Liberal Democrats | R. Evans | 383 | 8.4% |
| Green | C. Jones | 209 | 4.6% |
| Turnout | | | 53.0% |
| Conservative hold | | | |

=== Normanton ===
Location of Normanton ward

Normanton
| Party | Candidate | Votes | % |
|---|---|---|---|
| Labour | S. Bolton | 2,052 | 55.3% |
| Conservative | I. Gray | 1,039 | 28.0% |
| Liberal Democrats | E. Blane | 299 | 8.1% |
| Independent Labour | L. Shillingford | 205 | 5.5% |
| Green | E. Wall | 118 | 3.2% |
| Turnout | | | 48.8% |
| Labour hold | | | |

=== Osmaston ===
Location of Osmaston ward

Osmaston
| Party | Candidate | Votes | % |
|---|---|---|---|
| Labour | R. Laxton | 1,684 | 73.5% |
| Conservative | R. Broadfield | 430 | 18.8% |
| Liberal Democrats | S. King | 176 | 7.7% |
| Turnout | | | 36.7% |
| Labour hold | | | |

=== Sinfin ===
Location of Sinfin ward

Sinfin
| Party | Candidate | Votes | % |
|---|---|---|---|
| Labour | N. Dhindsa | 2,097 | 61.3% |
| Conservative | S. Brindley | 916 | 26.8% |
| Liberal Democrats | G. Pulham | 408 | 11.9% |
| Turnout | | | 45.9% |
| Labour hold | | | |

=== Spondon ===
Location of Spondon ward

Spondon
| Party | Candidate | Votes | % |
|---|---|---|---|
| Conservative | D. Dickinson | 2,939 | 48.7% |
| Labour | C. Williamson | 2,575 | 42.6% |
| Liberal Democrats | D. Holbrook | 351 | 5.8% |
| Green | P. Chapman | 176 | 2.9% |
| Turnout | | | 58.7% |
| Conservative hold | | | |
