= 1992 Derby City Council election =

1992 UK local government election

← 1991	7 May 1992	1994 →

15 of the 44 seats in the Derby City Council 23 seats needed for a majority
	First party	Second party
Party	Conservative	Labour
Last election	22	22
Seats won	10	4
Seats after	22	22
Seat change	Steady	Steady
Popular vote	28,390	18,083
Percentage	55.9%	35.6%
- Map showing the results of the 1992 Derby City Council elections.
Council control before election
No overall control
Council control after election
No overall control

The 1992 Derby City Council election took place on 7 May 1992 to elect members of Derby City Council in England. Local elections were held in the United Kingdom in 1992. This was on the same day as other local elections. 14 of the council's 44 seats were up for election. No seats changed hands and the council remained under no overall control, with the Conservatives and Labour holding exactly half the seats each.

== Overall results ==
1992 Derby City Council Election
Party	Seats	Gains	Losses	Net gain/loss	Seats %	Votes %	Votes	+/−
Conservative	10	0	0	Steady	71.4	55.9	28,390	
Labour	4	0	0	Steady	28.6	35.6	18,083	
Liberal Democrats	0	0	0	Steady	0.0	7.2	3,679	
Green	0	0	0	Steady	0.0	1.1	553	
SDP	0	0	0	Steady	0.0	0.1	53	
Total	14						50,758	

== Ward results ==
=== Abbey ===
Location of Abbey ward

Abbey
Party	Candidate	Votes	%
Labour	M. Fuller	1,502	50.3%
Conservative	G. Shaw-Clarke	1,231	41.2%
Liberal Democrats	D. Turner	132	4.4%
Green	P. Brock	67	2.2%
SDP	D. Milner	53	1.8%
Turnout			32.2%
Labour hold			

=== Allestree ===
Location of Allestree ward

Allestree
Party	Candidate	Votes	%
Conservative	B. Chadwick	3,087	78.0%
Labour	A. Cotton	603	15.2%
Liberal Democrats	H. Jones	270	6.8%
Turnout			50.1%
Conservative hold			

=== Alvaston ===
Location of Alvaston ward

Alvaston
Party	Candidate	Votes	%
Conservative	P. Fullarton	1,755	52.5%
Labour	G. Fuller	1,395	41.7%
Liberal Democrats	A. Todd	196	5.9%
Turnout			41.2%
Conservative hold			

=== Babington ===
Location of Babington ward

Babington
Party	Candidate	Votes	%
Labour	A. Kalia	1,326	53.1%
Conservative	A. Javed	691	27.7%
Liberal Democrats	M. Burgess	379	15.2%
Green	M. Davies	103	4.1%
Turnout			34.1%
Labour hold			

=== Blagreaves ===
Location of Blagreaves ward

Blagreaves
Party	Candidate	Votes	%
Conservative	K. Lester	1,997	55.5%
Labour	N. Wilkinson	1,087	30.2%
Liberal Democrats	A. Spendlove	515	14.3%
Turnout			44.6%
Conservative hold			

=== Boulton ===
Location of Boulton ward

Boulton
Party	Candidate	Votes	%
Conservative	K. Thompson	2,141	51.7%
Labour	K. Merry	1,683	40.6%
Liberal Democrats	P. Harlow	319	7.7%
Turnout			45.9%
Conservative hold			

=== Breadsall ===
Location of Breadsall ward

Breadsall
Party	Candidate	Votes	%
Conservative	Pauline Latham	3,255	57.3%
Labour	E. Woolley	2,126	37.4%
Liberal Democrats	M. McCann	296	5.2%
Turnout			39.5%
Conservative hold			

=== Chaddesden ===
Location of Chaddesden ward

Chaddesden
Party	Candidate	Votes	%
Conservative	H. Johnson	1,775	48.2%
Labour	A. Macdonald	1,678	45.5%
Liberal Democrats	T. Holyoake	232	6.3%
Turnout			43.3%
Conservative hold			

=== Chellaston ===
Location of Chellaston ward

Chellaston
Party	Candidate	Votes	%
Conservative	K. Brown	3,093	70.3%
Labour	B. Jackson	1,090	24.8%
Liberal Democrats	A. Winson	157	3.6%
Green	C. Cooper	57	1.3%
Turnout			45.9%
Conservative hold			

=== Darley ===
Location of Darley ward

Darley
Party	Candidate	Votes	%
Conservative	C. Hulls	2,875	66.0%
Labour	W. Wright	1,041	23.9%
Liberal Democrats	W. Webley	375	8.6%
Green	L. Ludkiewicz	68	1.6%
Turnout			46.3%
Conservative hold			

=== Derwent ===
Location of Derwent ward

Derwent
Party	Candidate	Votes	%
Labour	M. Repton	1,285	54.3%
Conservative	J. Ormond	906	38.3%
Liberal Democrats	S. King	142	6.0%
Green	E. Wall	32	1.4%
Turnout			31.2%
Labour hold			

=== Kingsway ===
Location of Kingsway ward

Kingsway
Party	Candidate	Votes	%
Conservative	N. Brown	2,102	65.3%
Labour	K. Hepworth	747	23.2%
Liberal Democrats	I. Care	304	9.4%
Green	C. Jones	65	2.0%
Turnout			42.1%
Conservative hold			

=== Litchurch ===
Location of Litchurch ward

Litchurch
Party	Candidate	Votes	%
Labour	A. Rehman	1,219	56.3%
Conservative	M. Yaqub	654	30.2%
Liberal Democrats	C. Harris	175	8.1%
Green	J. Macdonald	118	5.4%
Turnout			29.2%
Labour hold			

=== Spondon ===
Location of Spondon ward

Spondon
Party	Candidate	Votes	%
Conservative	J. Leatherbarrow	2,828	64.9%
Labour	M. Byrne	1,301	29.8%
Liberal Democrats	D. Holbrook	187	4.3%
Green	P. Chapman	43	1.0%
Turnout			43.2%
Conservative hold			
