= 1988 Derby City Council election =

1988 UK local government election

← 1987	5 May 1988	1990 →

15 of the 44 seats in the Derby City Council 23 seats needed for a majority
	First party	Second party
Party	Conservative	Labour
Last election	20	23
Seats won	10	5
Seats after	24	20
Seat change	▲4	▼3
Popular vote	31,862	19,806
Percentage	56.0%	34.8%
- Map showing the results of the 1988 Derby City Council elections.
Council control before election
Labour
Council control after election
Conservative

The 1988 Derby City Council election took place on 5 May 1988 to elect members of Derby City Council in England. Local elections were held in the United Kingdom in 1988. This was on the same day as other local elections. 15 of the council's 44 seats were up for election. The Conservatives gained control of the council from the Labour Party.

== Overall results ==
1988 Derby City Council Election
Party	Seats	Gains	Losses	Net gain/loss	Seats %	Votes %	Votes	+/−
Conservative	10	4	0	▲4	66.7	56.0	31,862	
Labour	5	1	4	▼3	33.3	34.8	19,806	
SLD	0	0	1	▼1	0.0	6.9	3,912	
SDP	0	0	0	Steady	0.0	1.4	783	
Green	0	0	0	Steady	0.0	0.5	310	
Independent	0	0	0	Steady	0.0	0.3	183	
Total	15						56,856	

== Ward results ==
=== Abbey ===
Location of Abbey ward

Abbey
Party	Candidate	Votes	%
Labour	M. Fuller	1,945	50.8%
Conservative	S. Hart	1,647	43.0%
SLD	J. Kaye	139	3.6%
Green	P. Brock	101	2.6%
Turnout			40.6%
Labour hold			

=== Allestree ===
Location of Allestree ward

Allestree
Party	Candidate	Votes	%
Conservative	B. Chadwick	3,491	79.7%
Labour	B. Cox	488	11.1%
SLD	H. Jones	403	9.2%
Turnout			53.5%
Conservative hold			

=== Alvaston ===
Location of Alvaston ward

Alvaston
Party	Candidate	Votes	%
Conservative	P. Fullarton	1,887	52.4%
Labour	G. Sweeting	1,518	42.1%
SLD	H. Holbrook	198	5.5%
Turnout			44.3%
Conservative gain from Labour			

=== Babington ===
Location of Babington ward

Babington
Party	Candidate	Votes	%
Labour	A. Kalia	1,500	49.0%
Conservative	A. Mohammad	866	28.3%
SLD	M. Burgess	531	17.4%
SDP	K. Dickenson	106	3.5%
Green	E. Wall	56	1.8%
Turnout			39.0%
Labour hold			

=== Blagreaves ===
Location of Blagreaves ward

Blagreaves
Party	Candidate	Votes	%
Conservative	D. Hogg	2,543	60.4%
Labour	C. Jordan	1,244	29.5%
SLD	E. Blane	176	4.2%
SDP	L. Barker	165	3.9%
Green	J. Billington	83	2.0%
Turnout			52.7%
Conservative hold			

=== Boulton ===
Location of Boulton ward

Boulton
Party	Candidate	Votes	%
Conservative	K. Thompson	2,433	51.9%
Labour	C. Thrower	1,659	35.4%
SLD	P. Harlow	380	8.1%
SDP	D. Carrington	216	4.6%
Turnout			49.9%
Conservative gain from Labour			

=== Breadsall ===
Location of Breadsall ward

Breadsall
Party	Candidate	Votes	%
Conservative	G. Orton	2,788	54.4%
Labour	M. Wawman	2,042	39.9%
SLD	S. Hartropp	294	5.7%
Turnout			43.8%
Conservative gain from Labour			

=== Chaddesden ===
Location of Chaddesden ward

Chaddesden
Party	Candidate	Votes	%
Conservative	G. Else	2,113	49.3%
Labour	S. Bolton	1,936	45.2%
SLD	L. Byrne	236	5.5%
Turnout			48.9%
Conservative gain from Labour			

=== Chellaston ===
Location of Chellaston ward

Chellaston
Party	Candidate	Votes	%
Conservative	K. Brown	3,664	73.9%
Labour	J. Marshall	1,072	21.6%
SLD	M. Essex	220	4.4%
Turnout			52.3%
Conservative hold			

=== Darley ===
Location of Darley ward

Darley
Party	Candidate	Votes	%
Conservative	C. Hulls	3,032	65.6%
Labour	J. Dickens	1,114	24.1%
SLD	W. Webley	313	6.8%
SDP	P. Seward	161	3.5%
Turnout			49.0%
Conservative hold			

=== Derwent ===
Location of Derwent ward

Derwent
Party	Candidate	Votes	%
Labour	M. Repton	1,522	
Labour	D. Hayes	1,475	
Conservative	C. Daniels	926	
Conservative	C. James	883	
SLD	B. Benson	270	
SLD	S. King	268	
Independent	S. Smith	85	
Turnout			37.2%
Labour gain from SLD			
Labour hold			

=== Kingsway ===
Location of Kingsway ward

Kingsway
Party	Candidate	Votes	%
Conservative	N. Brown	2,442	69.0%
Labour	J. Evans	764	21.6%
SLD	P. Turner	333	9.4%
Turnout			45.1%
Conservative hold			

=== Litchurch ===
Location of Litchurch ward

Litchurch
Party	Candidate	Votes	%
Labour	M. Wood	1,545	59.8%
Conservative	B. Wayne	670	25.9%
SLD	R. Kahn	272	10.5%
Independent	L. Brown	98	3.8%
Turnout			33.4%
Labour hold			

=== Spondon ===
Location of Spondon ward

Spondon
Party	Candidate	Votes	%
Conservative	J. Leatherbarrow	3,360	65.0%
Labour	P. Taylor	1,457	28.2%
SLD	D. Holbrook	147	2.8%
SDP	P. Peat	135	2.6%
Green	L. Ludkiewicz	70	1.4%
Turnout			49.9%
Conservative hold			
