= 1987 Derby City Council election =

1987 UK local government election

← 1986	7 May 1987	1988 →

15 of the 44 seats in the Derby City Council 23 seats needed for a majority
	First party	Second party	Third party
Party	Labour	Conservative	Alliance
Last election	25	17	2
Seats won	7	8	0
Seats after	23	20	1
Seat change	▼1	▲2	▼1
Popular vote	19,617	24,797	10,687
Percentage	35.3%	44.6%	19.2%
- Map showing the results of the 1987 Derby City Council elections.
Council control before election
Labour
Council control after election
Labour

The 1987 Derby City Council election took place on 7 May 1987 to elect members of Derby City Council in England. Local elections were held in the United Kingdom in 1987. This was on the same day as other local elections. 15 of the council's 44 seats were up for election. The Labour Party retained control of the council.

== Overall results ==
1987 Derby City Council Election
Party	Seats	Gains	Losses	Net gain/loss	Seats %	Votes %	Votes	+/−
Conservative	8	2	0	▲2	53.3	44.6	24,797	
Labour	7	1	2	▼1	46.7	35.3	19,617	
Alliance	0	0	1	▼1	0.0	19.2	10,687	
Independent	0	0	0	Steady	0.0	0.9	501	
Total	15						55,602	

== Ward results ==
=== Abbey ===
Location of Abbey ward

Abbey
Party	Candidate	Votes	%
Labour	M. Ainsley	1,669	45.4%
Conservative	B. Larimore	1,432	38.9%
Alliance	L. Wilson	579	15.7%
Turnout			%
Labour hold			

=== Babington ===
Location of Babington ward

Babington
Party	Candidate	Votes	%
Labour	J. Maltby	1,593	52.7%
SDP-Liberal Alliance	M. Burgess	815	27.0%
Conservative	T. Fogg	613	20.3%
Turnout			36.5%
Labour hold			

=== Chaddesden ===
Location of Chaddesden ward

Chaddesden
Party	Candidate	Votes	%
Conservative	H. Johnson	1,923	46.2%
Labour Party (UK)	M. Streets	1,502	36.1%
Alliance	H. Holbrook	733	17.6%
Turnout			47.3%
Conservative gain from Labour			

=== Chellaston ===
Location of Chellaston ward

Chellaston
Party	Candidate	Votes	%
Conservative	J. Jennings	2,611	51.7%
Labour	W. Lythgoe	1,457	28.8%
Alliance	M. Essex	615	12.2%
Independent	J. Lissett	369	7.3%
Turnout			54.1%
Conservative hold			

=== Darley ===
Location of Darley ward

Darley
Party	Candidate	Votes	%
Conservative	P. Hickson	2,797	55.7%
Labour	M. Repton	1,377	27.4%
SDP-Liberal Alliance	L. Pratt	849	16.9%
Turnout			53.3%
Conservative hold			

=== Derwent ===
Location of Derwent ward

Derwent
Party	Candidate	Votes	%
Labour	F. Tunnicliffe	1,348	42.4%
Alliance	S. King	1,221	38.4%
Conservative	D. Heath	611	19.2%
Turnout			42.5%
Labour gain from Alliance			

=== Kingsway ===
Location of Kingsway ward

Kingsway
Party	Candidate	Votes	%
Conservative	M. Bertalan	2,191	58.6%
Alliance	L. Barker	860	23.0%
Labour	J. Evans	662	17.7%
Independent	S. Gibson	26	0.7%
Turnout			47.3%
Conservative hold			

=== Litchurch ===
Location of Litchurch ward

Litchurch
Party	Candidate	Votes	%
Labour	J. McGiven	1,585	57.1%
Conservative	B. Wayne	688	24.8%
Alliance	R. Khan	504	18.1%
Turnout			34.8%
Labour hold			

=== Littleover ===
Location of Littleover ward

Littleover
Party	Candidate	Votes	%
Conservative	R. Wood	1,976	51.1%
Labour	A. Cooper	938	24.3%
Alliance	R. Turner	847	21.9%
Independent	K. Dickenson	106	2.7%
Turnout			53.1%
Conservative hold			

=== Mackworth ===
Location of Mackworth ward

Mackworth
Party	Candidate	Votes	%
Conservative	A. Clemson	1,378	42.4%
Labour	M. Tanvir	1,251	38.5%
Alliance	R. Jackson	619	19.1%
Turnout			44.6%
Conservative gain from Labour			

=== Mickleover ===
Location of Mickleover ward

Mickleover
Party	Candidate	Votes	%
Conservative	N. Glen	2,842	65.2%
Alliance	A. Wilbraham	899	20.6%
Labour	P. Taylor	617	14.2%
Turnout			51.2%
Conservative hold			

=== Normanton ===
Location of Normanton ward

Normanton
Party	Candidate	Votes	%
Labour	F. Brocklehurst	1,473	47.6%
Conservative	D. Hogg	1,137	36.7%
Alliance	W. Drew	486	15.7%
Turnout			39.6%
Labour hold			

=== Osmaston ===
Location of Osmaston ward

Osmaston
Party	Candidate	Votes	%
Labour	J. Woolley	1,119	57.0%
Conservative	D. Brown	511	26.0%
Alliance	P. Elsbury	334	17.0%
Turnout			30.1%
Labour hold			

=== Sinfin ===
Location of Sinfin ward

Sinfin
Party	Candidate	Votes	%
Labour	A. Mullarkey	1,500	52.0%
Conservative	K. Lester	869	30.1%
Alliance	P. James	514	17.8%
Turnout			38.3%
Labour hold			

=== Spondon ===
Location of Spondon ward

Spondon
Party	Candidate	Votes	%
Conservative	C. Brown	3,218	57.9%
Labour	D. Hayes	1,617	29.1%
Alliance	R. Guilford	721	13.0%
Turnout			53.8%
Conservative hold			
