= 1991 Derby City Council election =

1991 UK local government election

← 1990	2 May 1991	1992 →

15 of the 44 seats in the Derby City Council 23 seats needed for a majority
	First party	Second party
Party	Conservative	Labour
Last election	24	20
Seats won	6	9
Seats after	22	22
Seat change	▼2	▲2
Popular vote	24,523	23,820
Percentage	43.9%	42.6%
- Map showing the results of the 1991 Derby City Council elections.
Council control before election
Conservative
Council control after election
No overall control

The 1991 Derby City Council election took place on 2 May 1991 to elect members of Derby City Council in England. Local elections were held in the United Kingdom in 1991. This was on the same day as other local elections. 15 of the council's 44 seats were up for election. The council, which had previously been under Conservative control, fell under no overall control with the Conservatives and Labour holding exactly half the seats each.

== Overall results ==
1991 Derby City Council Election
Party	Seats	Gains	Losses	Net gain/loss	Seats %	Votes %	Votes	+/−
Labour	9	2	0	▲2	60.0	42.6	23,820	
Conservative	6	0	2	▼2	40.0	43.9	24,523	
Liberal Democrats	0	0	0	Steady	0.0	11.6	6,478	
Green	0	0	0	Steady	0.0	1.9	1,086	
Total	15						55,907	

== Ward results ==
=== Abbey ===
Location of Abbey ward

Abbey
Party	Candidate	Votes	%
Labour	M. Ainsley	2,054	55.0%
Conservative	G. Shaw	1,267	33.9%
Liberal Democrats	G. Wood	279	7.5%
Green	P. Brock	136	3.6%
Turnout			40.9%
Labour hold			

=== Babington ===
Location of Babington ward

Babington
Party	Candidate	Votes	%
Labour	F. Hussain	1,596	58.8%
Liberal Democrats	M. Burgess	505	18.6%
Conservative	M. Ali	489	18.0%
Green	B. Emmans	122	4.5%
Turnout			36.3%
Labour hold			

=== Chaddesden ===
Location of Chaddesden ward

Chaddesden
Party	Candidate	Votes	%
Labour	J. Till	2,209	48.7%
Conservative	H. Johnson	1,857	40.9%
Liberal Democrats	D. Smith	474	10.4%
Turnout			53.0%
Labour gain from Conservative			

=== Chellaston ===
Location of Chellaston ward

Chellaston
Party	Candidate	Votes	%
Conservative	J. Jennings	2,893	60.6%
Labour	H. Gorham	1,321	27.7%
Liberal Democrats	A. Hartropp	417	8.7%
Green	C. Cooper	140	2.9%
Turnout			49.2%
Conservative hold			

=== Darley ===
Location of Darley ward

Darley
Party	Candidate	Votes	%
Conservative	P. Hickson	2,826	57.6%
Labour	J. Gilmore	1,298	26.5%
Liberal Democrats	W. Webley	692	14.1%
Green	L. Ludkiewicz	88	1.8%
Turnout			52.6%
Conservative hold			

=== Derwent ===
Location of Derwent ward

Derwent
Party	Candidate	Votes	%
Labour	D. Hayes	1,784	59.1%
Conservative	J. Ormond	863	28.6%
Liberal Democrats	M. McCann	308	10.2%
Green	I. Sandars	64	2.1%
Turnout			40.1%
Labour hold			

=== Kingsway ===
Location of Kingsway ward

Kingsway
Party	Candidate	Votes	%
Conservative	M. Bertalan	2,171	59.1%
Labour	K. Hepworth	1,017	27.7%
Liberal Democrats	A. Spendlove	486	13.2%
Turnout			48.1%
Conservative hold			

=== Litchurch ===
Location of Litchurch ward

Litchurch
Party	Candidate	Votes	%
Labour	J. McGiven	1,744	64.8%
Conservative	M. Najeeb	614	22.8%
Liberal Democrats	C. Harris	196	7.3%
Green	L. Davies	139	5.2%
Turnout			36.7%
Labour hold			

=== Littleover ===
Location of Littleover ward

Littleover
Party	Candidate	Votes	%
Conservative	R. Wood	1,918	47.3%
Liberal Democrats	L. Care	1,060	26.2%
Labour	J. Green	1,006	24.8%
Green	M. Attenborrow	67	1.7%
Turnout			56.4%
Conservative hold			

=== Mackworth ===
Location of Mackworth ward

Mackworth
Party	Candidate	Votes	%
Labour	G. Summers	1,929	55.7%
Conservative	A. Clemson	1,242	35.8%
Liberal Democrats	S. Hartropp	294	8.5%
Turnout			50.6%
Labour gain from Conservative			

=== Mickleover ===
Location of Mickleover ward

Mickleover
Party	Candidate	Votes	%
Conservative	R. Broadfield	2,710	62.5%
Labour	A. Macdonald	922	21.3%
Liberal Democrats	D. Turner	573	13.2%
Green	C. Jones	128	3.0%
Turnout			51.5%
Conservative hold			

=== Normanton ===
Location of Normanton ward

Normanton
Party	Candidate	Votes	%
Labour	Chris Williamson	1,810	55.1%
Conservative	K. Webley	1,104	33.6%
Liberal Democrats	L. Jones	285	8.7%
Green	E. Wall	83	2.5%
Turnout			44.0%
Labour hold			

=== Osmaston ===
Location of Osmaston ward

Osmaston
Party	Candidate	Votes	%
Labour	M. Streets	1,254	64.8%
Conservative	D. Brown	479	24.8%
Liberal Democrats	A. Todd	201	10.4%
Turnout			31.8%
Labour hold			

=== Sinfin ===
Location of Sinfin ward

Sinfin
Party	Candidate	Votes	%
Labour	A. Mullarkey	1,960	63.7%
Conservative	C. Hateley	822	26.7%
Liberal Democrats	E. Blane	295	9.6%
Turnout			40.9%
Labour hold			

=== Spondon ===
Location of Spondon ward

Spondon
Party	Candidate	Votes	%
Conservative	C. Brown	3,268	57.2%
Labour	K. Merry	1,916	33.5%
Liberal Democrats	D. Holebrook	413	7.2%
Green	P. Chapman	119	2.1%
Turnout			55.8%
Conservative hold			
