= Hausmaler =

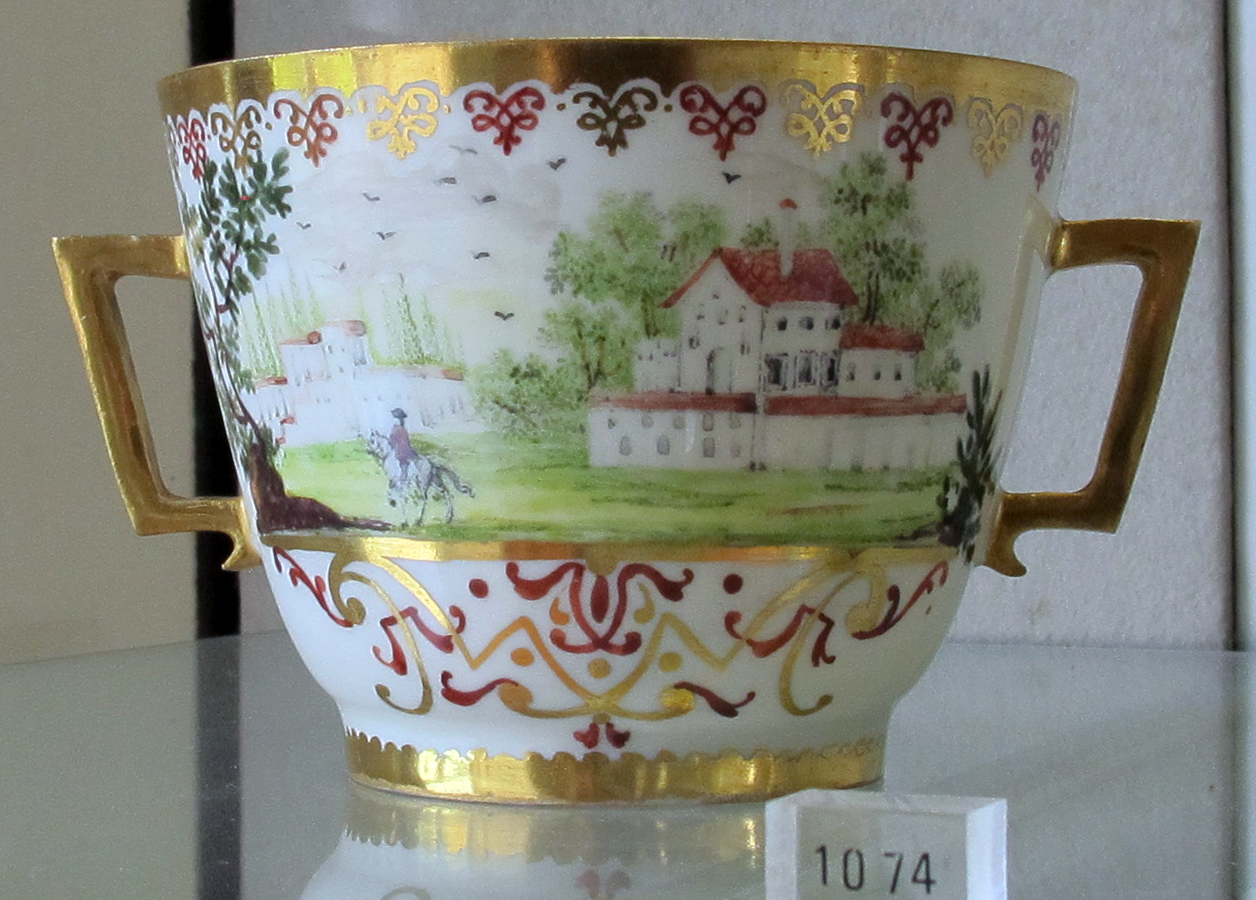
Augsburg hausmalerei cup 1725-40

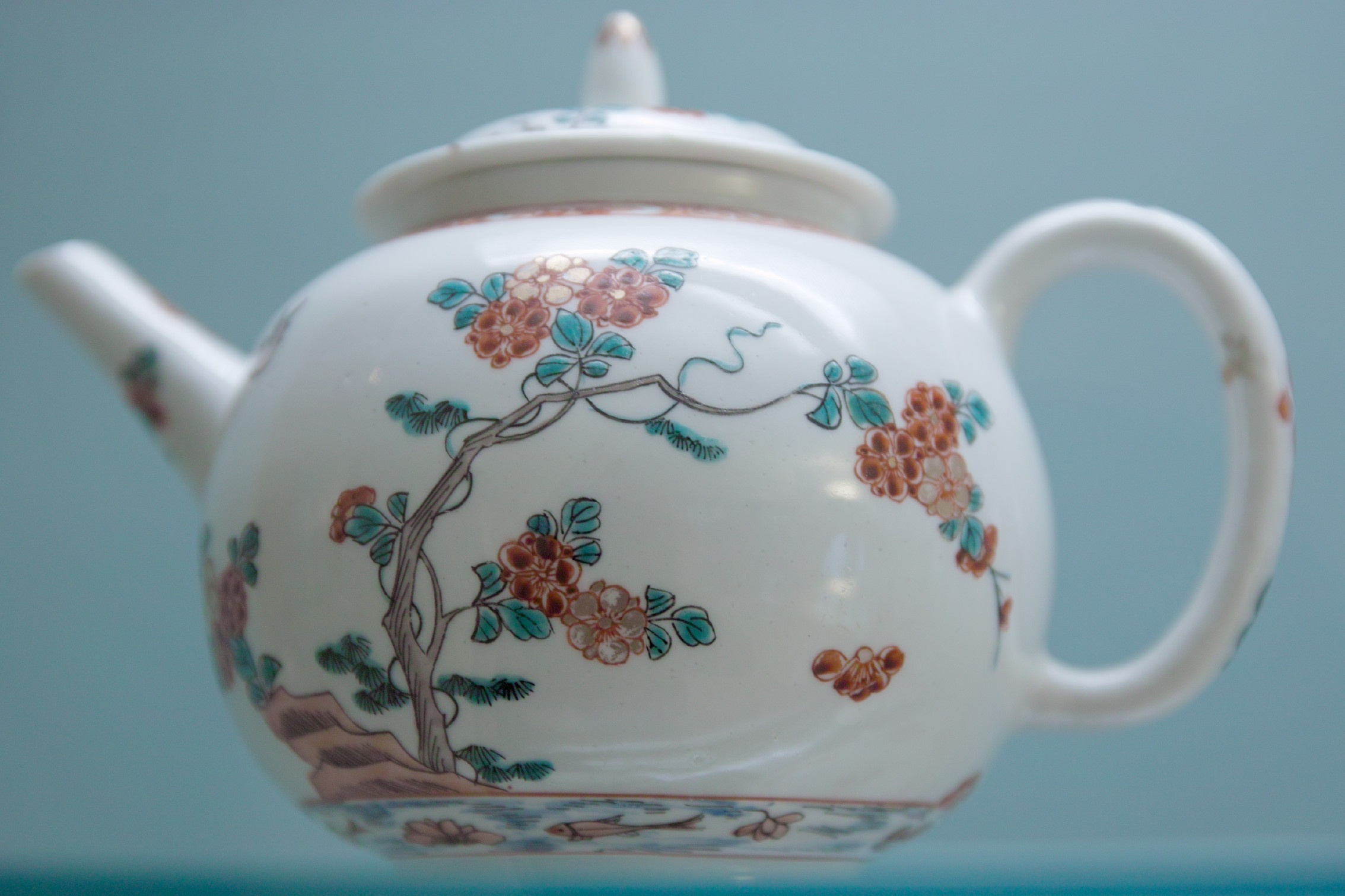
Meissen teapot of c. 1725, painted in Delft c. 1730

In pottery hausmaler (German: home painter) is a term for the artist, the style, and the pieces in hausmalerei, the process of buying pieces of pottery as plain "blanks", and then painting them in small workshops, or the homes of painters, before a final firing. In European pottery of the 17th to 19th centuries this was at certain times and places a significant part of production, and the decoration could be of very high quality. In England this was referred to as "outside decoration" and was also very important in the 18th and early 19th century, with some revival in the 20th.

Hausmalerei began with freelance glass enamelers in Bohemia but developed in Germany on white tin-glazed earthenware in the 17th century, when glazed and fired but unpainted wares "in the white" were purchased on speculation by unsupervised freelance ateliers of china painters, who decorated them in overglaze enamel colours and gilding, which were fixed by a further light firing in their own small kilns. A few such freelance decorators of faience operated in Nuremberg in the late 17th century, but hausmalerei developed in Augsburg into a notable feature of tin-glazed earthenware production during the early 18th century, before the workshops turned entirely to porcelain.

Hausmalerei reached an artistic pinnacle with paintings on Meissen porcelain and Vienna porcelain in the second quarter of the 18th century; sometimes Meissen porcelains remained blank for decades before they were painted. Many painters and workshops have distinctive styles; a few were amateurs.

In France, the production of Sèvres porcelain was tightly controlled, so that painting was under strict factory control. By contrast, Limoges porcelain has always maintained a strong tradition of atelier decoration, whether near Limoges or at Paris.

In England, among independent porcelain-painters of the mid-18th century, William Duesbury went on to manufacture porcelain as a founder of the Royal Crown Derby and owner of manufactories at Bow, Chelsea, Derby and Longton Hall. Chamberlain's Factory making Worcester porcelain was another started by an enamel painter, and the complicated career of the painter William Billingsley included periods running a decorating shop. The largest concentration of artists was in Londo, and many wares were sent there to be decorated, and them passed to the showrooms that were also in London, long after porcelain ceased to be made in the capital.

In England, America and elsewhere, china painting became a popular hobby or semi-professional pastime in the mid-19th century, normally for ladies, and many factories sold blanks. The 204-piece Canadian Historical Dinner Service of 1897 represents a peak of this trend, with 16 female artists, most from middle-class backgrounds, taking part in decorating the service.

Traditions of hausmalerei were never wholly extinguished. The founder of Heinrich & Co began as a hausmaler, purchasing porcelain blanks until he set up his own kilns ca 1903. From 1930 the Czech hausmaler Josef Kuba (1896-1972) maintained an atelier in Karlsbad, Czech Republic, and later in Wiesau, Bavaria. supplied by various porcelain manufacturers in Bavaria.

After the disturbances of the Russian Revolution many pre-revolutionary blanks of the Imperial Porcelain Factory, Saint Petersburg were painted by artists as long as ten years later, in bold new Constructivist styles; such pieces are now highly sought after.

Chinese Canton porcelain of the 18th and 19th centuries used a similar system, but on a larger scale. The blanks were Jingdezhen porcelain which was carried the considerable distance to Guangzhou before being decorated.
