= Benjamin Vulliamy =

British clockmaker

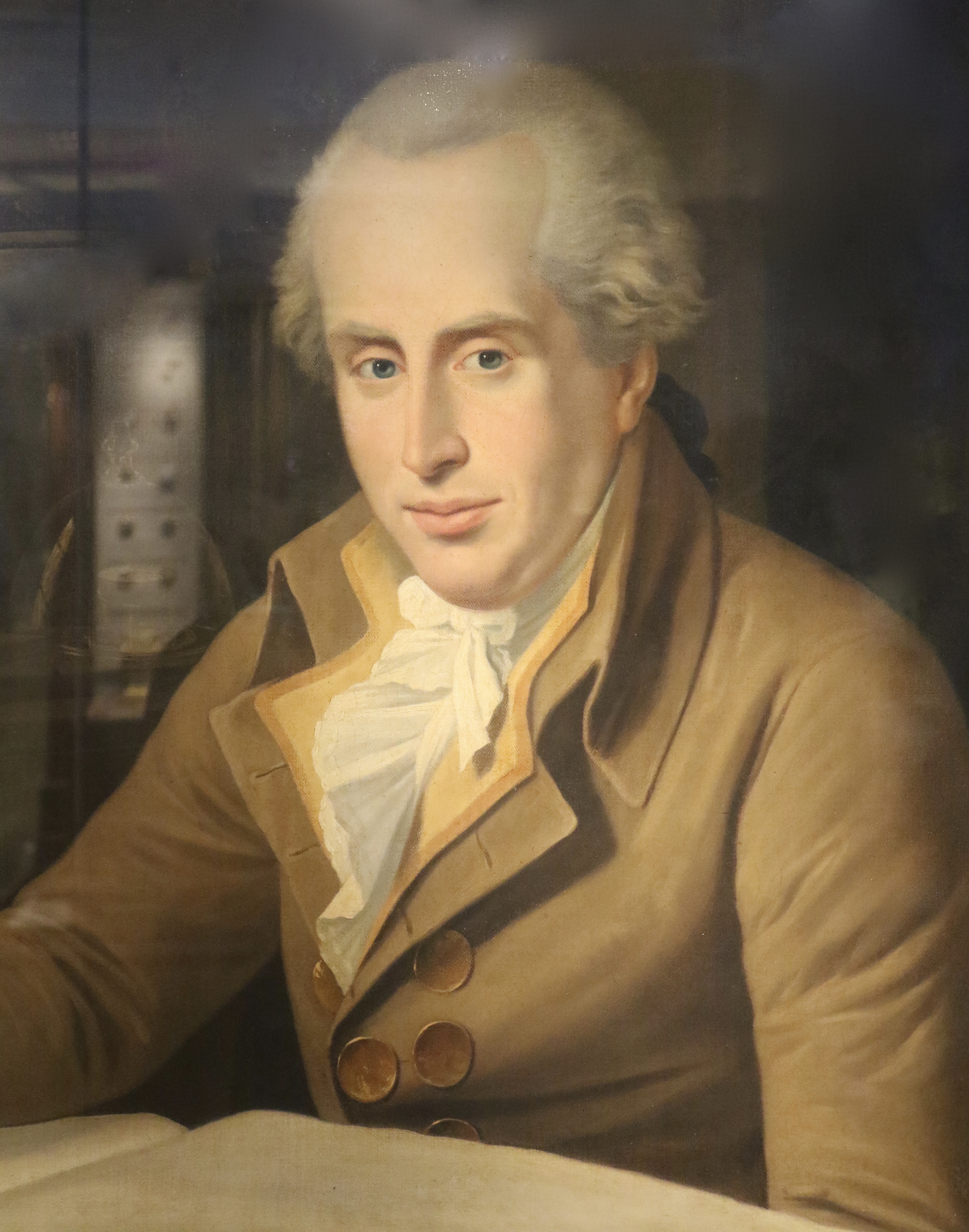
- From a painting in the Clockmakers' Museum at the Science Museum, London
- Born: 1747; London, England
- Died: 31 December 1811 (aged 63–64)
- Occupation: Clockmaker
- Spouse: Sarah de Gingins
- Children: Benjamin Lewis Vulliamy; Lewis Vulliamy
- Parent(s): de:Justin Vulliamy, Mary Gray Vulliamy
- Relatives: de:Benjamin Gray, (maternal grandfather)

Benjamin Vulliamy (1747 – 31 December 1811), was a British clockmaker responsible for building the Regulator Clock, which, between 1780 and 1884, was the main timekeeper of the King's Observatory Kew and the official regulator of time in London. In 1773 Vulliamy had received a Royal Appointment as the King's Clockmaker.

== Biography ==
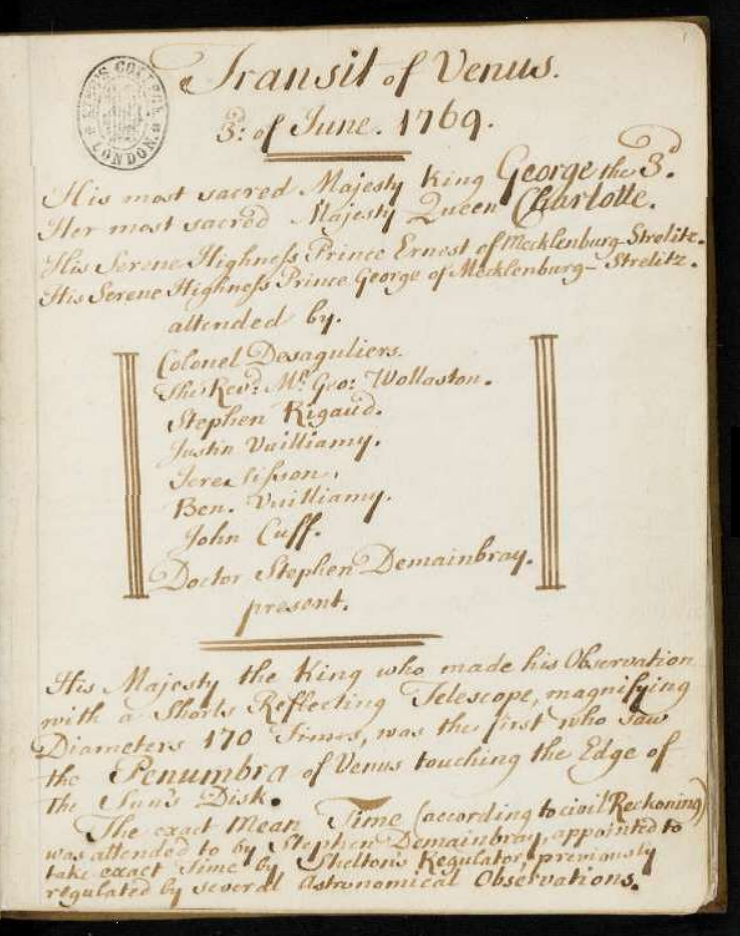
Extract from Observations on the Transit of Venus, a manuscript notebook from the collections of George III, showing Justin and Benjamin's presence at the 1769 Transit of Venus observations at the King's Observatory in Richmond-upon-Thames.

Benjamin Vulliamy was born in London, the son of Justin Vulliamy and his wife Mary. A clockmaker from Switzerland, the father had immigrated to London around 1730. Justin became an associate of Benjamin Gray, a watchmaker established in Pall Mall. He married Gray's daughter Mary in London.

Justin succeeded his father-in-law in taking over the business.

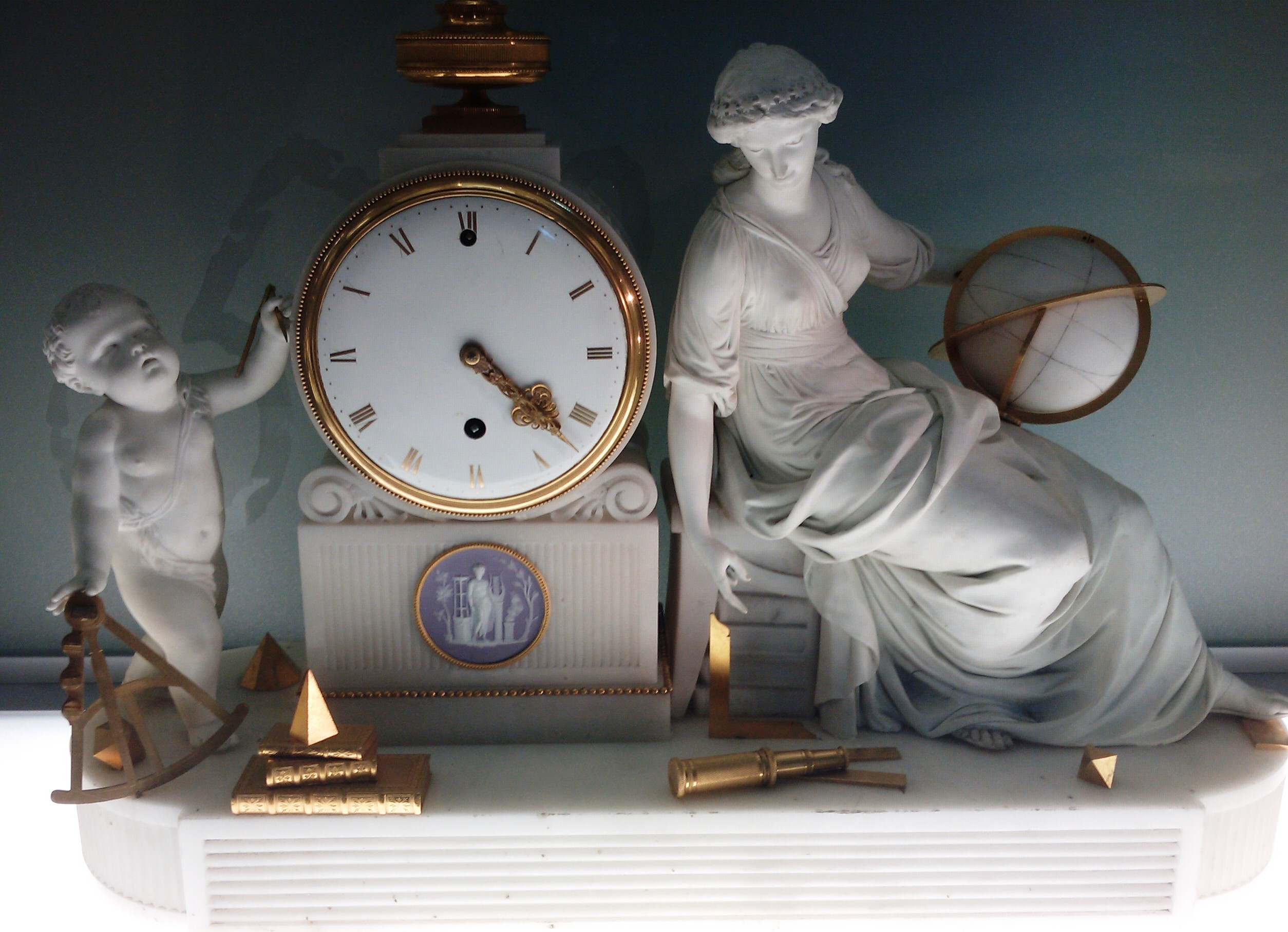
A Vulliamy clock combined with Derby Porcelain, now in Derby Museum

From an early age, the younger Vulliamy showed interest in pursuing his father's career. As an adult, he began to earn a reputation as a builder of mantel clocks, decorative timepieces that adorned the halls of high society. (In the 21st century, some of his works can be found at the Derby Museum and Art Gallery). His talent earned him a Royal Appointment in 1773, through which he came to receive an endowment of £150 a year as George III's King's Clockmaker (the similar distinction, Royal Watchmaker, was then held by George Lindsay). The king, an enthusiast for watches and mechanical devices, was patron of Justin Vulliamy, but Benjamin was the only one of the pair to receive this significant honour.

Benjamin went into business with his father in 1780 (Vulliamy & Son). Father and son worked together until Justin died on 1 December 1797. Around 1780, Vulliamy was commissioned to build the Regulator Clock, the main timekeeper of the King's Observatory Kew, which served as an unofficial Prime Meridian. It also kept official London time until 1884, when the Greenwich Royal Observatory assumed both roles. The Regulator Clock is now in the Science Museum in London.

Vulliamy had married and in 1780 his son Benjamin Lewis was born. This son was the last Vulliamy to devote himself to the family clockmaking business. None of his descendants took up the art of clockmaking. His grandson, George John Vulliamy, did achieve notability as an architect.

=== The Vulliamy clocks ===
Vulliamy clocks were of considerable value and represented the climax of technology at the time. A Vulliamy clock was presented to the Chinese emperor by the diplomatic mission of George Macartney to Beijing in 1793. Vulliamy clocks were combined with fine porcelain figures to create artefacts that combined both science and art. The overall design was made by Vulliamy, but he employed prize-winning sculptors such as John Deare, John Bacon and Charles Rossi to create the figures, which were influenced by contemporary French designs.

The Vulliamy family used Crown Derby to produce the figures from porcelain designs. One of Vulliamy's assistants, Jacques Planche, was a brother of Andrew Planche, who had been involved in the early Derby Porcelain business. The Vulliamy business also subcontracted much of the clocks' manufacture to other skilled artisans. Vulliamy oversaw and created the final adjustments before sale.

== Portraits ==
- Painting by an anonymous artist, bequeathed by B. L. Vulliamy, 1854 (Clockmakers' Museum, London).
- Wax portrait by R. C. Lucas, 1851 (Clockmakers' Museum, London).

== See also ==
- Vulliamy family
- Halifax Town Clock, Nova Scotia
