= Vulliamy =

Vulliamy is a surname. Notable people with the surname include:

- Blanche Georgiana Vulliamy (1869–1923), English ceramic artist, painter, and writer
- C. E. Vulliamy (1886–1971), Anglo-Welsh biographer and author
- Ed Vulliamy (born 1954), English journalist and writer
- Fred Vulliamy (1913–1968), Canadian politician
- Grace Vulliamy (1878–1957), English nurse, refugee and relief worker and charity activist
- Vulliamy family, family of clockmakers
