= Andrew Planche =

British-French artist (1727–1805)

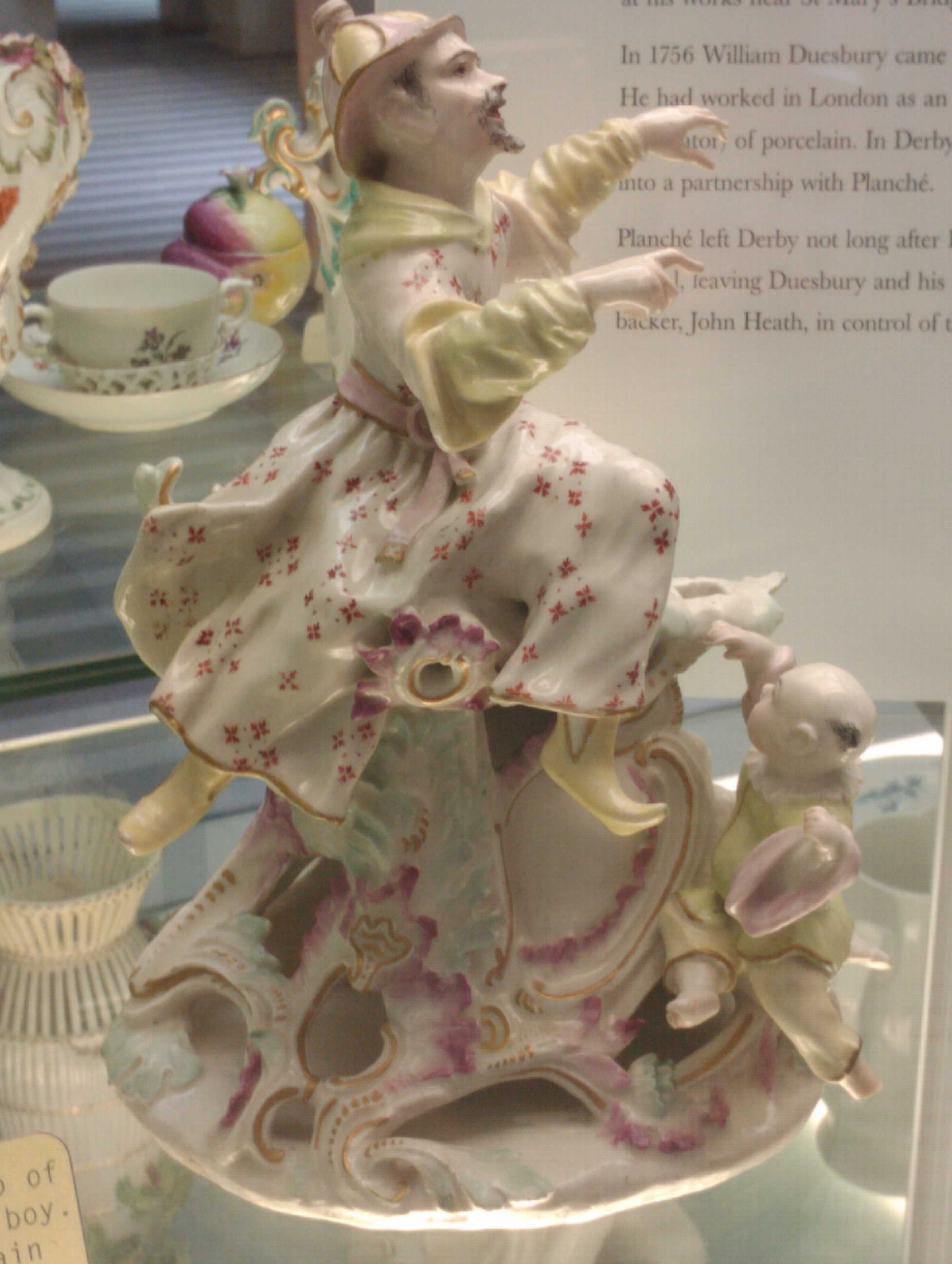
- Chinaman and boy by Planche
- Born: André Blanchet c.1727 Derby
- Died: 1805; Bath
- Other names: André Planché, André Planchè, Andrew Floor
- Occupation: Potter
- Spouse: Sarah Jones
- Children: Paul, James, James Burrows (bastard) and William
- Parent(s): Paul Blanchet and Marie Ann Fournier
- Relatives: Jacques Planché (brother), James Planché (nephew)

André or Andrew Planché, or Planchè (as written by William Bemrose in 1898) (c. 1727–1805), was a jeweller, potter and theatre person, son of French Huguenot refugees. He lived in Derby, where he had at least four children (Paul, James, James Burrows - bastard - and William).

== Biography ==
Andrew (Endre) Planche was born on 14 March 1728 to Marie Ann Fournier and Paul Planche, who was then a coffee merchant. He was baptised in Ryder Court's Chapel, at Soho. On 30 June 1740, he was hired as an apprentice by Edward Mountenay, a jewellery goldsmith established on Foster Lane near the Goldsmiths' Company of London. He took the opportunity to change his name from André Blanchet to Andrew Planche. On 22 September 1747, at the end of his 7-year apprenticeship, he married Sarah Stone at St. Pancras Church.

Modelling and porcelain making were taught to him by his father, who had worked at Meissen. At 17 years old, the young Planche would already be producing small pieces of porcelain in Derby. In 1749, he worked for William Littler in Longton Hall. There may also be a link between Marie Ann Fournier, Planche's mother, and Louis Fournier, model maker who had worked in Vincennes and then in Chantilly, France. Planche himself, could identify with Flanchet, who was well known for his practising the same occupation in Chelsea after having been Jean-Claude Duplessis' student in France.

Details of his life are sometimes unrecorded, but the birth of his sons in 1751, 1754 and two in 1756 are hard facts. The details of the baptism record the first born to his wife Sarah as Paul. The second was called James but he was to die in December 1754; he only lived two months. Paul and James were both baptised in St Alkmund. In 1756, two other sons were registered; James, illegitimate son of Andrew Planche and Margaret Burroughd; and William, son of Andrew Planche and his wife Sarah.

An agreement dated on 1 January 1756, attested to his involvement along with John Heath and William Duesbury in the new manufacture of porcelain established on Nottingham Road, which later became the Royal Crown Derby Porcelain Company. The three men agreed to “co-partners together as well in the art of making English China as also in buying and selling all sorts of wares belonging to the art of making china”.

However, at the end of the year 1756, Planche left Derby to go to London where he took back his former job as a jeweller at his uncle's company, Anthony Planche & Co in Westminster. In 1764, he changed his last name to Floor ("plancher" in French), in order to throw himself into a new career within the Theatre Company of comedians managed by Baker in York. With this company, he toured in the north of England during the summer . In 1768, he became a prompter at the Old Orchard Street Theatre in Bath, Somerset, where he stayed for thirty-one years. He died in January 1805 and was buried in St James Church in the same city.

== Work ==
Porcelain figures that are thought to be modelled by Planche are rare. Derby Museum and Art Gallery has an early 1752 model of a Chinaman and a boy. This model is from the "Dry Edge" period that ran from 1750 to 1756. This period got its name from the base that is unglazed.

The striking quality of the figurines used as models, made in the French style, was at the base of the development of Derby porcelain. Even though the execution of the "dry edge" models is now attributed to Agostino Carlini rather than to Planche, his contribution in running the company and more particularly in recruiting this gifted maker was important.

== Family ==
André's brother, Jacques, was a watchmaker who trained in Geneva. He became an assistant to Benjamin Vulliamy, who collaborated by including Derby porcelain in some of his clocks. James Planché, who was Jacques' son, became a playwright of pantomimes. James was given the title of Somerset Herald of the College of Arms of the Kings in London.
