= William Duesbury (1763–1796) =

William Duesbury II
- Born: 1763
- Died: 1796 (aged 32–33)
- Known for: Pottery

William Duesbury (1763–1796), was the owner of Royal Crown Derby pottery works.

== Biography ==
Duesbury was a son of William Duesbury (1725–1786) and the prosperity of the family pottery works (Royal Crown Derby) reached its highest point shortly after he succeeded to them. He took into partnership an Irish miniature-painter Michael Kean. Duesbury's health broke early, and he died in 1796.

== Family ==
Duesbury and his wife, Elizabeth, daughter of William Edwards, a solicitor of Derby (who remarried the above-mentioned Kean), had three sons, of whom William Duesbury, born in 1787, inherited, but did not take part in the works, which in 1809 were disposed of to Robert Bloor. The second son, Frederick Duesbury, became a well-known physician in London, and was father of the architect Henry Duesbury.
