= Benjamin Lewis Vulliamy =

English clockmaker

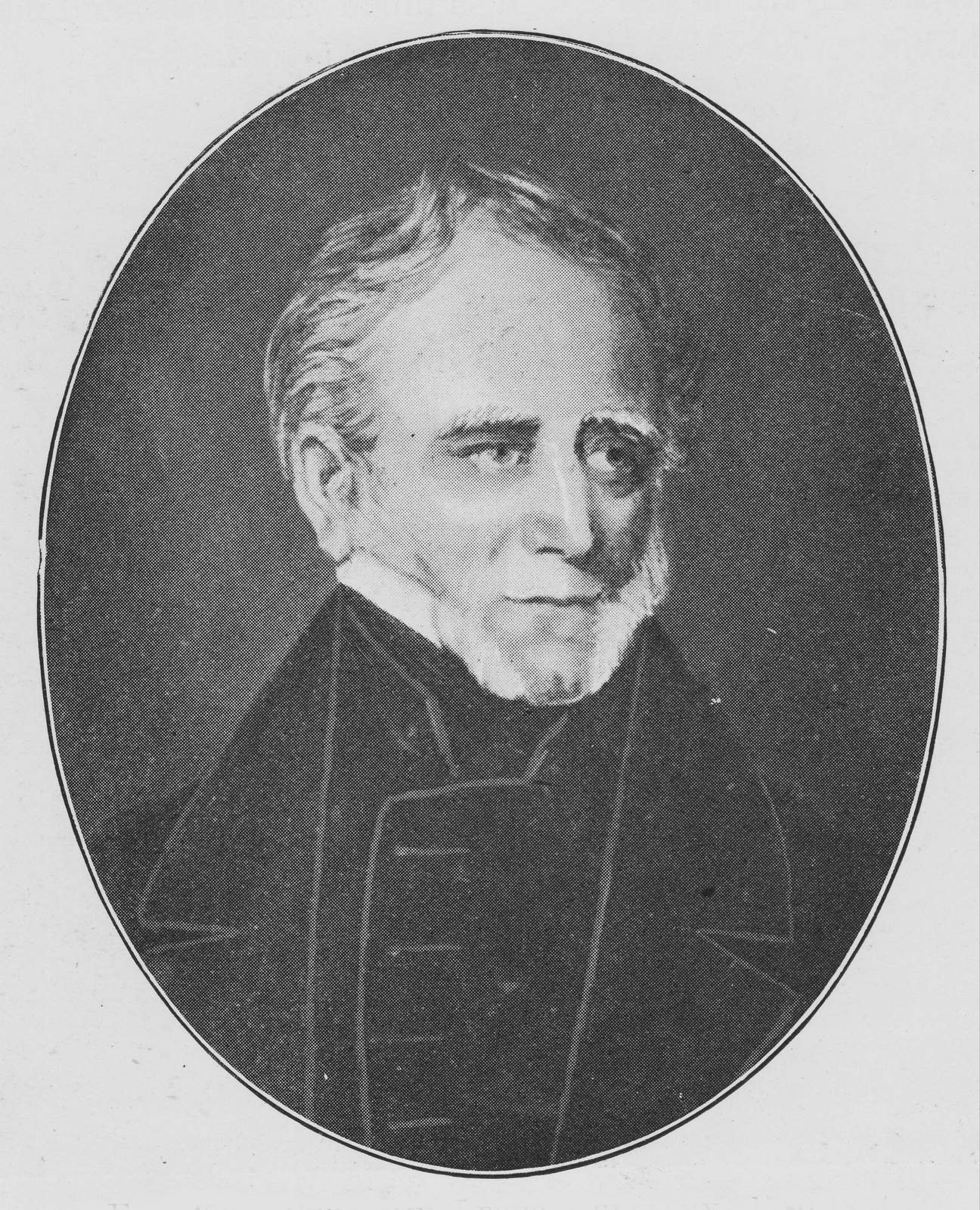
- Benjamin Lewis Vulliamy
- Born: 25 January 1780; London, England
- Died: 8 January 1854 (aged 73)
- Occupation: Clockmaker
- Children: George John Vulliamy
- Parent(s): Benjamin Vulliamy, Sarah de Gingins
- Relatives: Lewis Vulliamy (brother)

Benjamin Lewis Vulliamy (25 January 1780 – 8 January 1854) was a clockmaker, active in 18th and 19th century Britain. He succeeded his father Benjamin Vulliamy as head of the firm and Clockmaker to the Crown.

== Biography ==
The family was of Swiss origin. Justin Vulliamy, an ancestor, coming to England in 1704 to study the construction of English clocks and watches, under one Benjamin Gray, finally succeeded to his master's business at 68 Pall Mall, after having married his daughter. The old shop was situated at 52 Pall Mall, (where the Marlborough Club stood from 1868 until 1953) The firm obtained the appointment of Clockmakers to the Crown in 1742, which it held for 112 years. Justin Vulliamy died in 1797, the business being inherited by his son Benjamin (Benjamin Lewis's father).

Benjamin Lewis commenced early to make a special study of the history, theory and applications of horology; but while his father had always specialised in mantel clocks, he began to concentrate on turret clocks. Succeeding to the business in 1811, he went on to erect clocks for several important buildings including palaces, churches and the cathedral at Calcutta (see list below for further details).

Vulliamy was a man of considerable ingenuity, and introduced several peculiarities and improvements into his clocks. In 1816 Lord Palmerston (the then Secretary at War) engaged Vulliamy to repair the clock at Horse Guards (his main office). In doing so he made major changes and improvements to the going train; when finished it was, he claimed, the first public clock in London to include:

- a dead pinwheel escapement;
- a 2-second pendulum for greater accuracy (as previously used by Lepaute at the Hôtel de Ville, Paris);
- a second hand (on the movement, for more accurate regulation of the clock);
- a ratchet to keep the clock going while being wound;
- a degree-plate for measuring the arc of the pendulum.

In 1825 Vulliamy travelled to Paris to study the city's public clocks. Having returned he began working on a new clock, for the church of St Luke, West Norwood. He applied new ideas and thinking to the task and created what is now considered to be the UK's earliest example of a 'flat-bed' turret clock; it was installed in 1827. The following year it was inspected by Colonel John Jones on behalf of the Board of Ordnance (Vulliamy had been appointed clockmaker to the Honourable Board of Ordnance by the Duke of Wellington in 1826); Jones declared it to be 'superior to any turret clock I have seen' with regard to simplicity of construction, long-term durability, and regularity of keeping time. The clock installed in the new General Post Office, St. Martin's-le-Grand in 1828 was 'an exceptionally fine turret clock' originally made by Vulliamy for the Earl of Lonsdale in 1812; but when the asking-price of 4,000 guineas 'raised some problems' the clock was instead purchased by the Commissioners of Woods and Forests.

Benjamin Lewis Vulliamy was elected associate of the Institution of Civil Engineers on 13 March 1838, was auditor for the year 1842, and obtained in 1846 a premium of books for a paper on railway clocks. He was made free of the Clockmakers' Company on 4 December 1809, admitted to the livery in January 1810, and five times filled the office of master. He was elected a fellow of the Royal Astronomical Society on 14 January 1831, and retained his connection with the society till his death.

Vulliamy was a man who some considered to have a refined taste in art, and possessed knowledge of architecture, paintings, and engravings. His library was extensive, especially in that portion which related to his profession of clockmaking. He also possessed a valuable collection of ancient watches. He added to the libraries of the Clockmakers' Company and of the Institution of Civil Engineers. To the company he also gave numerous models and specimens of clocks and watches, and to the institution he presented in 1847 the works of a clock made by Thomas Tompion about 1670 for Charles II, by whom it was given to Barbara Palmer, 1st Duchess of Cleveland. On 1 March 1850 he exhibited to the Royal Archæological Institute six carvings in ivory by Fiamminge.

Vulliamy died on 8 January 1854, leaving two sons, Benjamin Lewis (1817–1886) and George John. Neither of his sons followed him in business and his stock of 170 gold watches and 100 clocks and cases was sold by Christine and Manson, King Street, St James’s on 8 June 1854. That same year the business was purchased by Charles Frodsham, a fellow clockmaker with whom Vulliamy had occasionally collaborated.

He was a great-uncle of the art potter Blanche Georgiana Vulliamy.

== Published works ==
Vulliamy published:

1. Some Considerations on the Subject of Public Clocks, London, 1828, 1831 (a supplement was issued in 1830, and again in 1831).
2. Summary of the Advantages attendant upon the new Mode of Construction of a Turret Clock, London, 1831.
3. On the Construction and Regulation of Clocks for Railway Stations, London, 1845 (reprinted from the Minutes of Proceedings of the Institution of Civil Engineers).
4. On the Construction and Theory of the Dead-beat Escapement for Clocks, London, 1846.
5. A Portion of the Papers relating to the Great Clock for the New Palace at Westminster, London, 1848.

Vulliamy wrote an account of the Stockton motion in English repeaters for the article Watch in Rees's Cyclopædia.

== List of Turret Clocks by Vulliamy ==
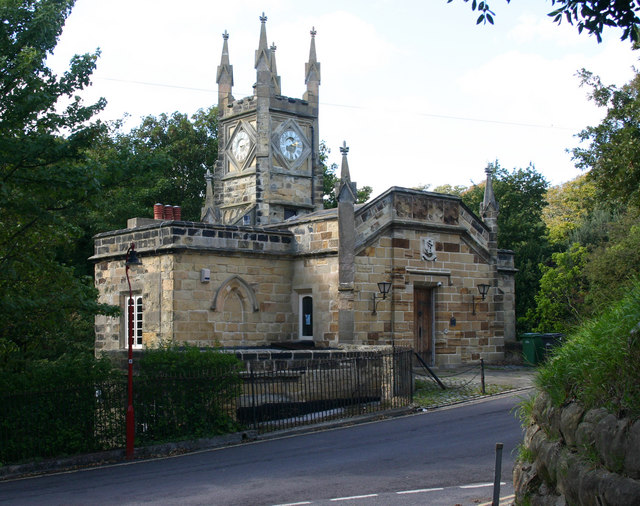
Maze Hill, St Leonards: James Burton's clock house.

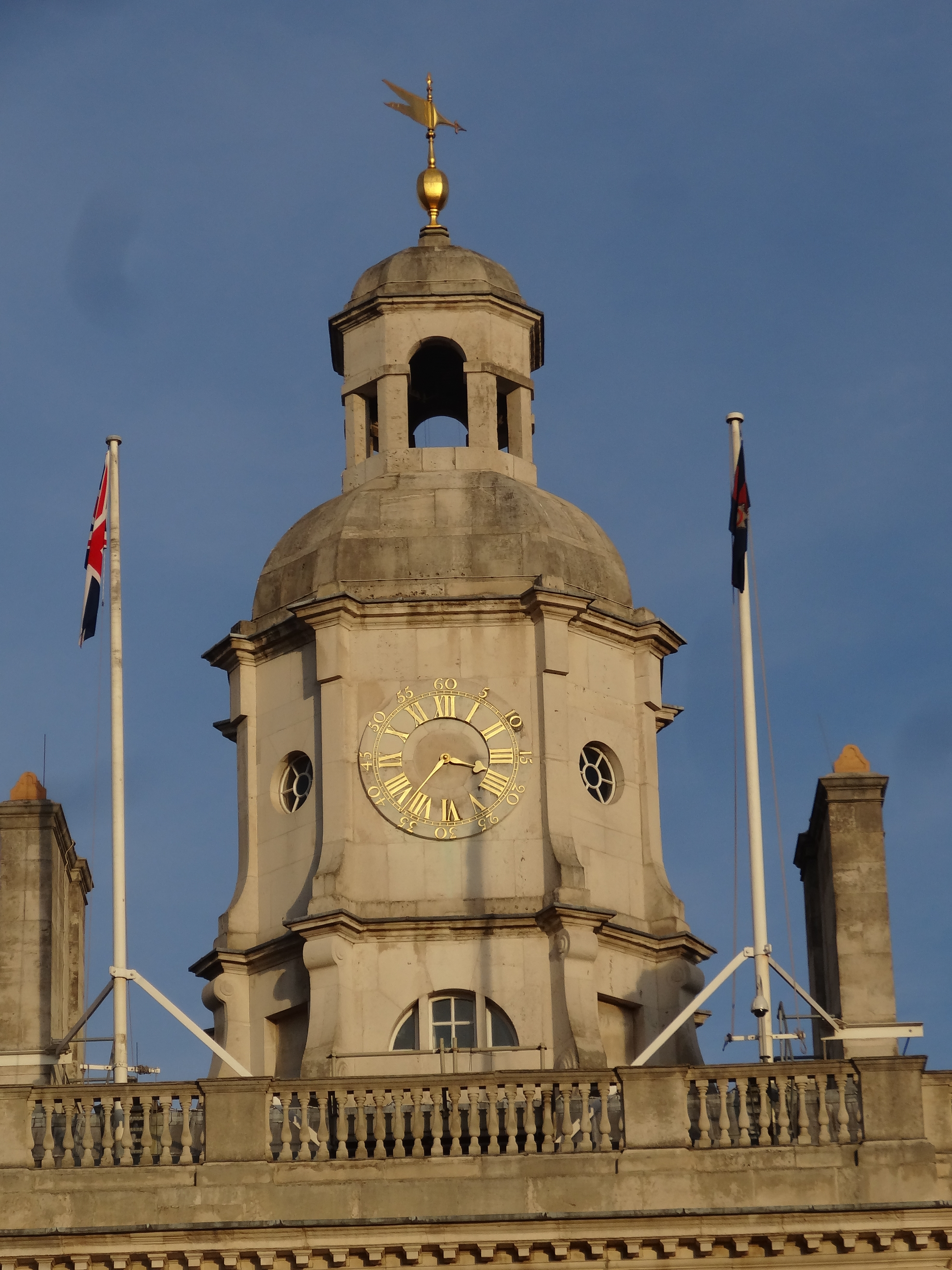
Horse Guards: dial-work and hands installed by Vulliamy in 1816.

- Royal Pavilion, Brighton ca. 1814 (moved to the main courtyard of Buckingham Palace in 1848)
- Horse Guards, London. 1816 (pendulum of 2 seconds) (repair and improvement of an earlier clock by Thwaites)
- Oriel College, Oxford 1820
- Lowther Castle c. 1823 (for the Earl of Lonsdale)
- Royal Mews, Buckingham Palace 1826
- St Luke's Church, West Norwood 1827
- St Mary in the Castle. Hastings 1829 (serial 1044)
- Quadrangle clock, Windsor Castle 1829
- General Post Office, St Martin’s le Grand 1830
- The Old Clock House, Maze Hill, St Leonards 1830
- Royal William Victualling Yard Plymouth 1831 (pendulum of 2 seconds)
- Hampton Court Palace c.1831 (re-using a clock by Vulliamy from St James's Palace dated 1799)
- St Margaret’s Church, Mapledurham, Oxfordshire 1832 (pendulum of 2 seconds)
- St George's Church, Ramsgate 1832
- St Bartholomew’s Church, Sydenham 1833
- St John's Church, Stratford 1834
- Holy Trinity Church, Adelaide, Australia 1836
- Quex Park 1837
- St Andrew's Church, Helions Bumpstead
- Tom Tower, Christ Church, Oxford 1838 (pendulum of 2 seconds)
- Alyth Parish Church clock, Perthshire 1840
- Church of St Philip and St James, Norton St Philip, Somerset 1841 (signed Vulliamy & Frodsham)
- Gopsall hall, Leicestershire 1842 (repairs to clock by Thomas Mudge of London, 1753)
- St Catherine's Church, Westonbirt, Gloucestershire 1843
- St Peter's Church, Bushley 1843
- St Michael's Church, Basingstoke, 1843 (pendulum of 2 seconds)
- St James' Church, Louth 1847 (replaced in 1901)
- Somerleyton Hall, Suffolk 1847 (pendulum of 2 seconds)
- Holy Trinity Church, Dilton Marsh 1847
- St Stephen's Church, Westminster 1850
- Holy Trinity Church, Markbeech 1853
- St John’s Church, Leytonstone
- University Press, Oxford
- St. Paul’s Cathedral, Kolkata
- Thicket Priory, York 1844

=== Gallery ===
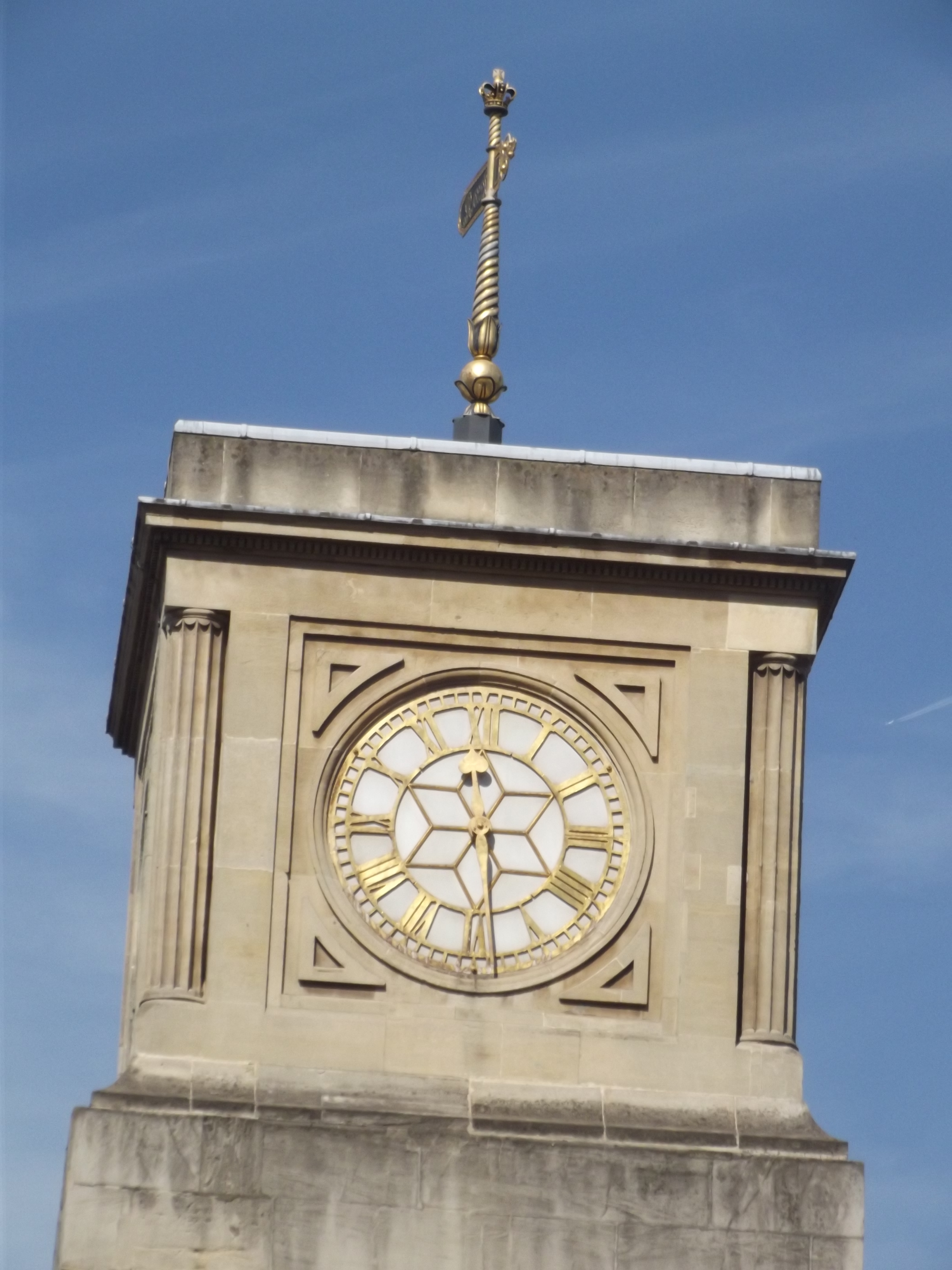
Royal Mews, Buckingham Palace

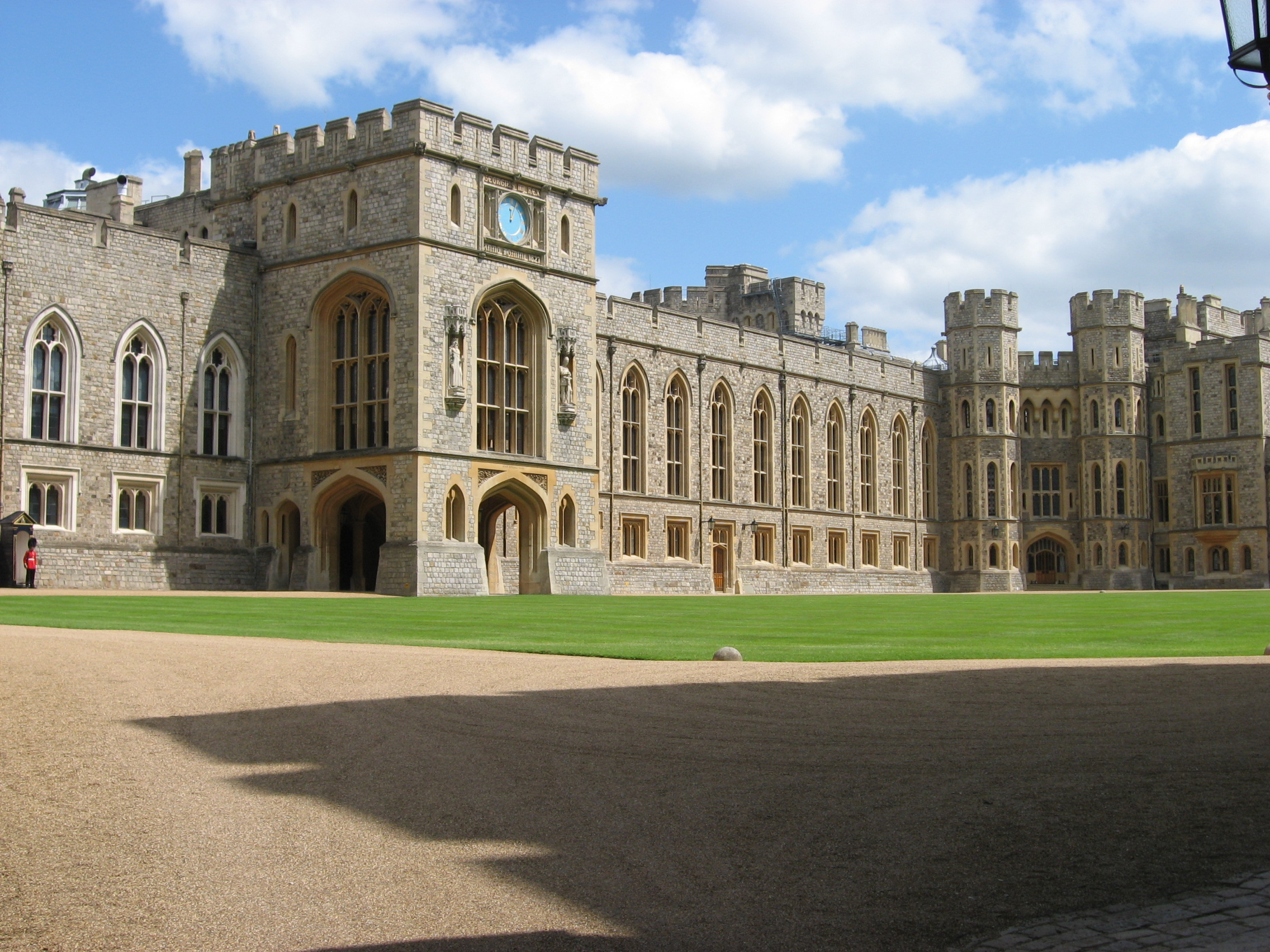
Windsor Castle, Upper Ward Quadrangle

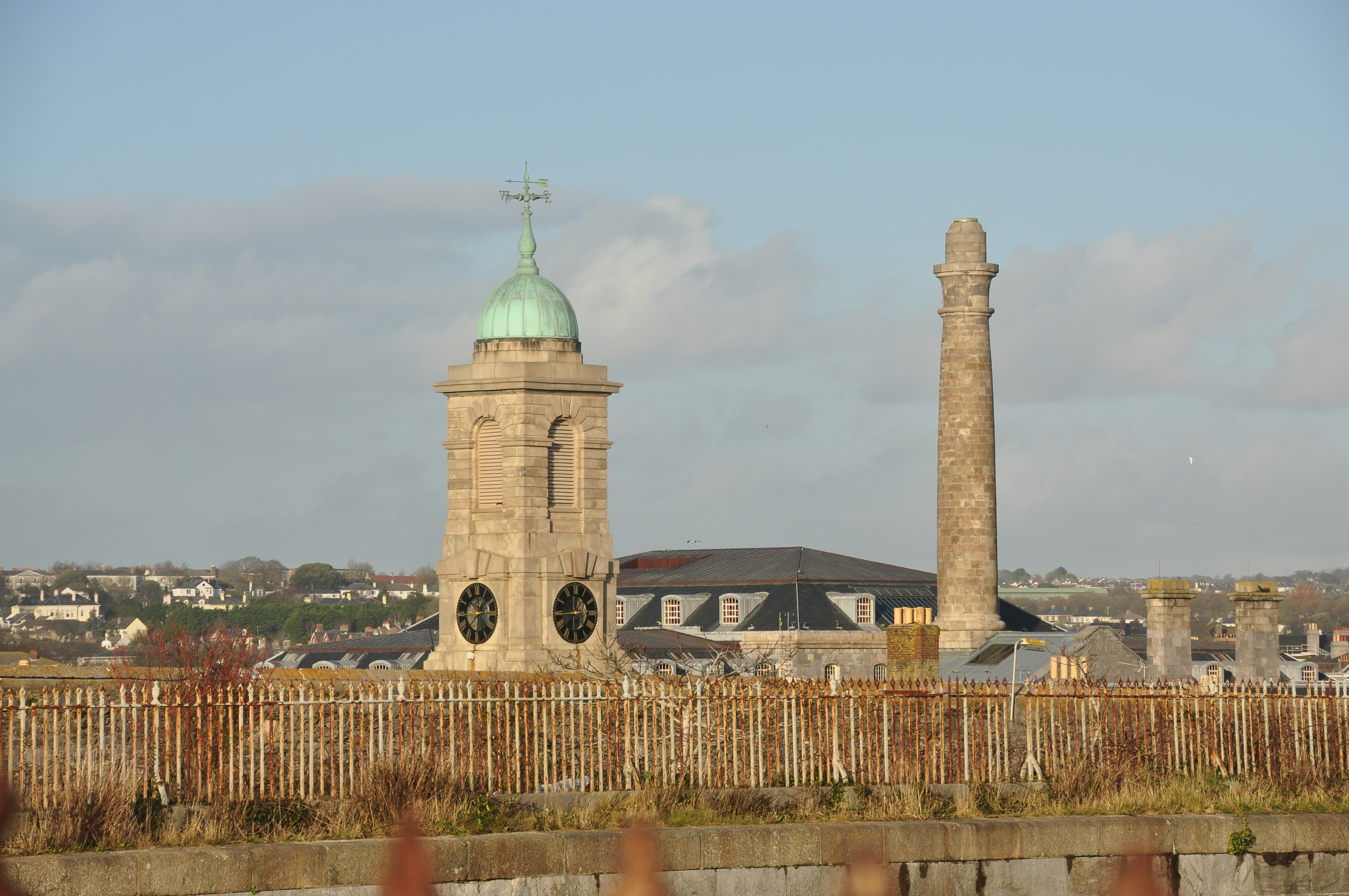
Melville Block, Royal William Victualling Yard, Plymouth

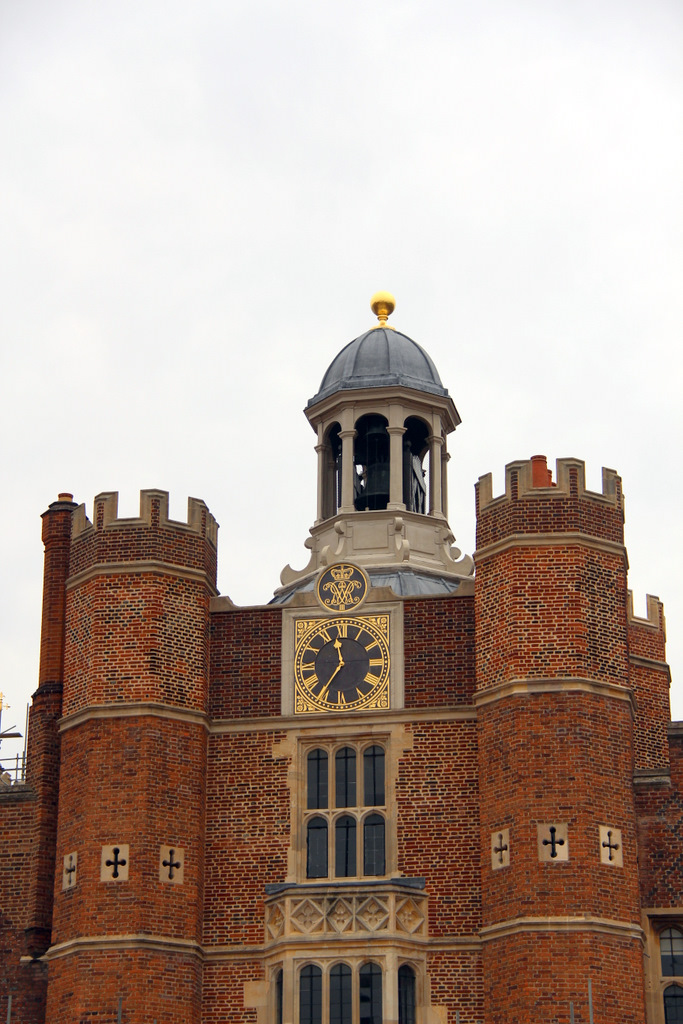
Base Court, Hampton Court Palace

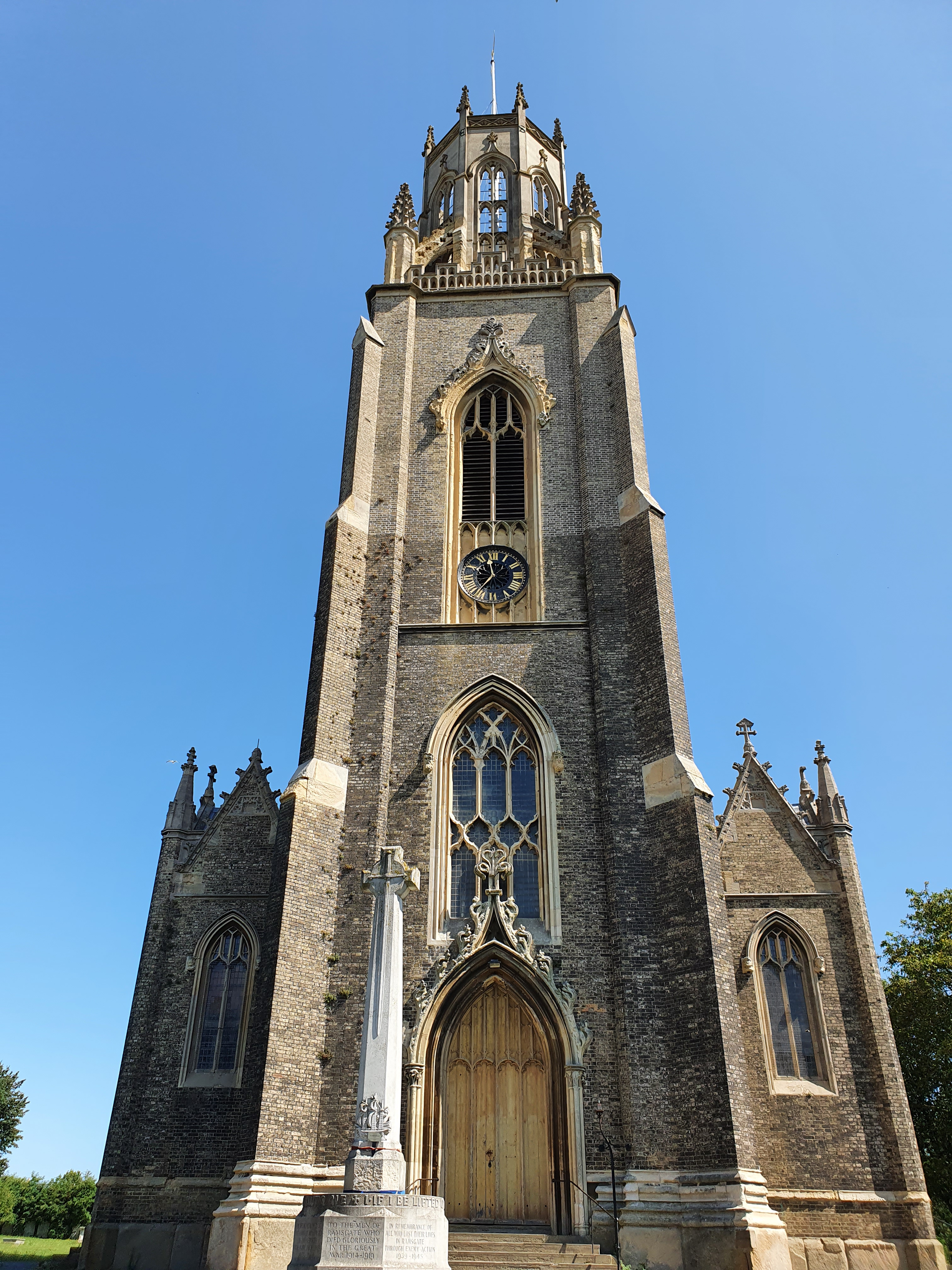
St George's Church, Ramsgate

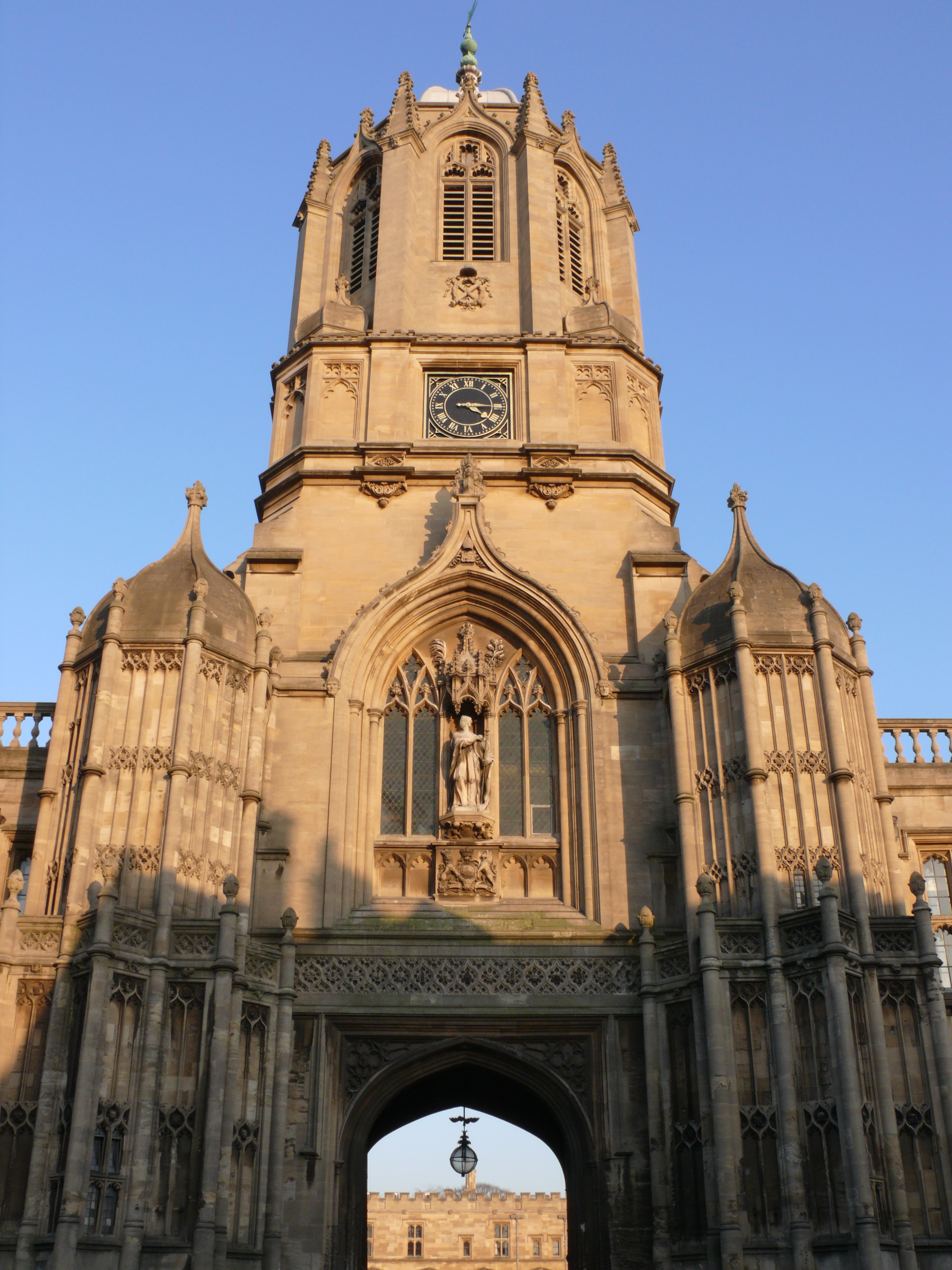
Tom Tower, Christ Church, Oxford

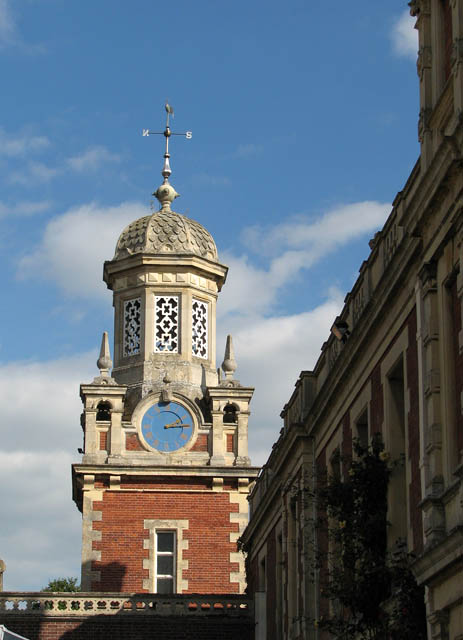
Somerleyton Hall

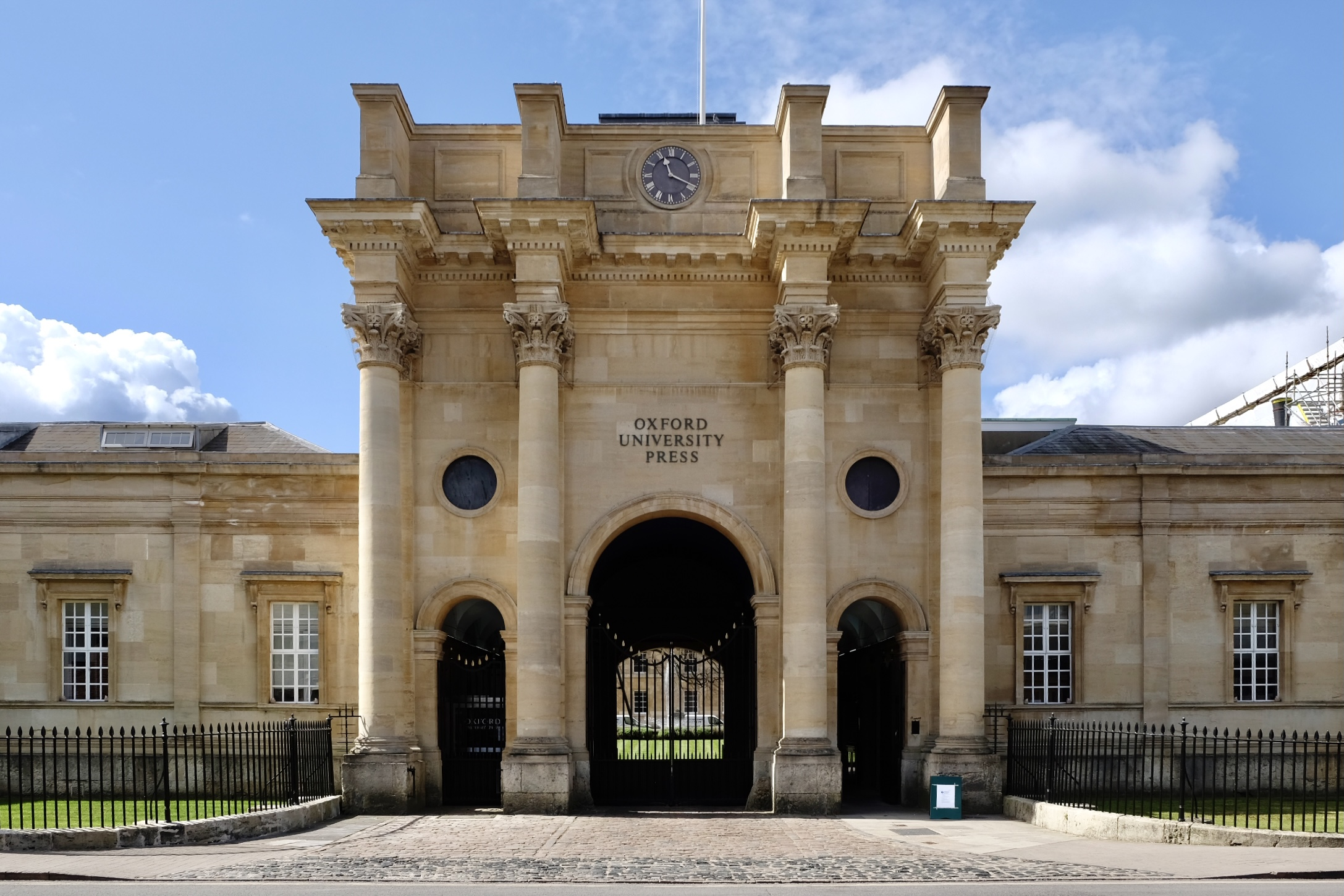
Oxford University Press, Walton Street, Oxford

== See also ==
- Vulliamy family
