= Georg Holtzendorff =

German painter

- Born: Saxony
- Other name: Georg Holzendorff
- Known for: Painting
- Notable work: Gladstone Dessert Service

Count Georg Holtzendorff (also spelled Holzendorff) was a painter of Saxony, specialist in landscapes, figure subjects and cherubs, who sought refuge in England in consequence of the Franco-Prussian War.

== Works ==
Holtzendorff worked for the Royal Crown Derby Porcelain Company and has drawn sketches representing the landscape of Derbyshire that were applied to china.

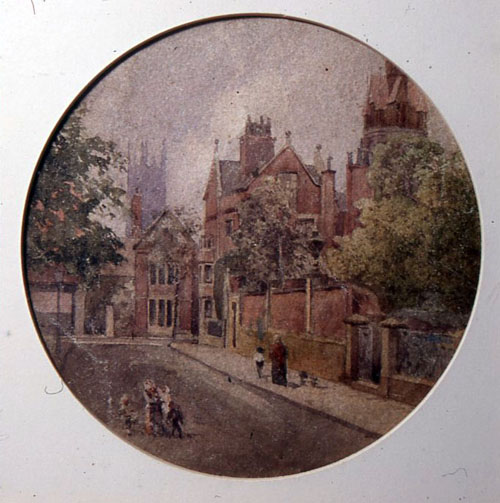
Becket Street by Georg Holtzendorff. Shows the Derby Museum and Art Gallery c. 1882, when there was a house for the curator.

His main work was the decoration of the Gladstone Dessert Service, presented by the Liberal Working Men of Derby to Prime Minister William Ewart Gladstone in 1883. A watercolor by Holtzendorff (c. 1882), with a view of Becket Street, Derby, with the Derby Museum and Art Gallery in the background, is the only remaining study on paper linked to the Gladstone service.
