= Michael Kean =

- Born: Dublin, Ireland
- Died: November 1823; London, England
- Education: Royal Academy of Arts
- Occupation: Artist
- Spouse: Elizabeth
- Children: 1

Michael Kean (died 1823) was an Irish artist. He was a miniature painter, and for a period was owner of the porcelain factory in Derby later known as Royal Crown Derby.

== Life ==
Kean was born in Dublin; he entered the Dublin Society's drawing schools in 1771 and studied ornament, landscape and figure drawing. In 1779 he gained a silver medal of the Dublin Society for drawings of sculpture.

Intending to become a sculptor, he was apprenticed to the sculptor Edward Smyth, but he established himself as a miniature portrait painter, moving to London where he practiced successfully. He exhibited at the Royal Academy each year from 1786 to 1790, and at the exhibitions of the Free Society of Artists.

In 1795 Kean entered into a partnership with William Duesbury II, proprietor of the porcelain factory in Derby later known as Royal Crown Derby. After Duesbury's death in 1796 he became manager of the factory; in 1798 he married Duesbury's widow Elizabeth, and they had one son.

During his period of management he introduced improvements in manufacture, and standards of porcelain decoration improved; the reputation of the factory increased. Kean, a hot-tempered man, quarrelled with his wife and stepchildren over the business, and lawsuits resulted. In 1811 Kean disposed of the factory and Robert Bloor, his clerk, took over. He retired to London, and died there in November 1823.
