= Vulliamy family =

The Vulliamy family originated in Switzerland, they were notable as clockmakers in 18th and 19th century Britain, and as architects in the 19th and 20th century. This encyclopedia article does not permit a full genealogy but rather illustrates the family's watchmaking and architectural connections.

- (François) Justin Vulliamy (1712–1797), born in Switzerland, moved to London to study in the 1730s and ended up settling there. He set up a business in partnership with Benjamin Gray (1676–1764), who was in 1742 appointed watchmaker in ordinary to King George II; he married Gray's daughter Mary and had four children with her, including:
  - Benjamin Vulliamy (1747–1811), took over the business from his father, he married Sarah de Gingins (1758–1841) and had fourteen children, including:
    - Benjamin Lewis Vulliamy (1780–1854), last in the family clockmaking firm, as none of his children went into it; he married Frances Moulton Stiles (1796–1868) and had three children, namely:
      - Benjamin Lewis (1815–1895), fundholder
      - George John Vulliamy (1817–1886), architect and civil engineer, married Eliza Umfreville (1822–1891), had five children.
      - Lucy Frances Sarah Vulliamy (1819–1872), married Stephen Jordan Rigaud (1816–1859) and had ten children.
    - Justin Theodore Vulliamy (1787–1870), gentleman worsted spinner, married Elizabeth Bull (1800–1863) and had seven children, including:
      - Edward Vulliamy (1828–1911), of independent means, married Antoinette La Bouchere (1839–1905) and had four children, including:
        - Anna Marguerite Vulliamy (1867–1946), married the plastic surgeon, William Henry Battle (1855–1936) and had five children.
      - Marie Vulliamy (1840–1885), married George Meredith (1828–1909) and had two children:
        - William Maxse Meredith (1865–1937)
        - Marie Eveleen, known as Mariette (1871–1933), who married Henry Parkman Sturgis (1847–1929)
    - Lewis Vulliamy (1791–1871), architect, married Elizabeth Ann Papendiek (1811–1867) and had five children, including:
      - Lewis Llewelyn Vulliamy (1838–1899), Civil engineer, married Sarah Walker (1845–1880), had three children.
      - Henry Paschal Vulliamy (1840–1895), architectural draughtsman, married Alice Mary Marston (1852–1930)
      - Edwyn Papendiek Vulliamy (1843–1914), married Edith Jane Beavan (1865–1953), had one child,
        - Colwyn Edward Vulliamy (1886–1971) (the Welsh author whose nom-de-plume was Anthony Rolls), married Eileen Muriel Hynes (1886–1943), had two children
          - John Sebastian Papendiek Vulliamy (1919–2007), architect married Winifred Shirley Hughes, had three children including:
            - Edward Sebastian Vulliamy (born 1954), a journalist and writer.
          - Patricia Drift Vulliamy (1917–1987), married Arthur Frederick James (1907–1984) and had four children
    - Frederick Vulliamy (1803–1892), banker, gentleman, married Charlotte Feldwick Crake (1816–1853) and had five children, including:
      - Arthur Frederick Vulliamy (1838–1915), solicitor, coroner for Ipswich, married Anna Marie Museur (1836–1926) and had thirteen children, including
        - Blanche Georgiana Vulliamy (1869–1923)
      - Henry Vulliamy (1842–1933), land agent and surveyor
  - Lewis Vulliamy (1749–1822), sugar refiner, married Lucy Frances Lucadou (1765–1849)

== Macartney mission to China ==
A "Vulliamy clock" was presented to the Chinese emperor by the diplomatic mission of George Macartney to Beijing in 1793.
