= William Bemrose =

- Born: 30 December 1831; Derby
- Died: 6 August 1908; Bridlington
- Education: King William's College
- Occupations: Writer, biographer
- Spouse(s): Margaret Romana Simpson, Lilian Cumming Hobson Bemrose
- Children: 6
- Relatives: Henry Howe Bemrose
- Awards: Fellow of the Society of Antiquaries (1905)

William Bemrose (1831–1908) was a writer on wood-carving and pottery, director of a printing business and Royal Crown Derby. He wrote and published a biography of Joseph Wright of Derby.

== Biography ==
Bemrose was born in Derby on 30 December 1831 and he was named after his father, founder of the printing and publishing firm of William Bemrose & Sons. He was the middle of three sons and he later had a sister. Bemrose's elder brother, Henry Howe Bemrose, was an M.P. and was made a baronet in 1897.

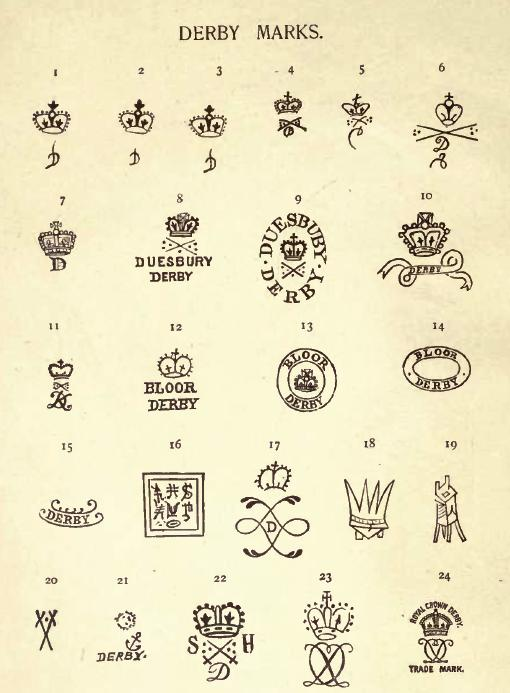
Marks made to Derby china - from Bemrose's 1898 book

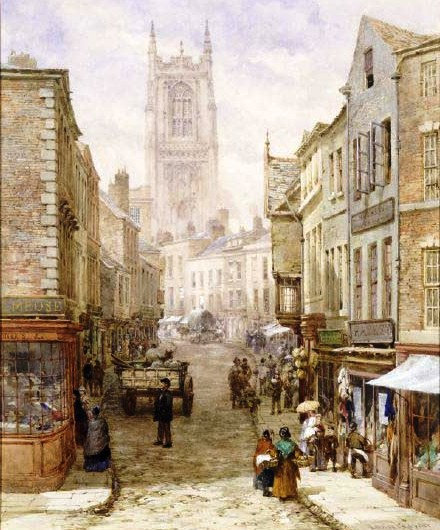
One of Bemroses Printers first premises in "Irongate" Derby in 1865

Bemrose went to school at King William's College in Castletown in the Isle of Man before joining the family's printing business in Derby. William and Henry expanded this business across England after their father retired in 1857. William married Margaret Romana in 1858.

William later became a director of the reviving Royal Crown Derby Porcelain Works, but throughout his life he took an interest in arts and craft. In 1862, he published what is thought to be the first manual on wood carving and it went to over twenty editions. He also published books on fretwork, marquetry, paper mosaics and paper-rosette work. In 1870, he co-authored a book on Derbyshire pottery and then published his own works on Bow, Chelsea and Derby Porcelain and later Longton Hall Porcelain.

Bemrose was an amateur painter and chaired the Derby Art Gallery committee. He collected art and pottery which he purchased during his wide travels. His interest in art and writing culminated in an academic study of Joseph Wright of Derby which was published with quality by his own company. He was also vice-president of Derby Sketching Club and a member of Derby Archaeological Society. He was also involved with organising an orphanage and served seventeen years in the 1st Derby Volunteers.

In 1901, his first wife died after they had five sons and a daughter. Two years later he married Lilian, the widow of a local newspaper owner. Bemrose died in Bridlington on 6 August 1908, but was buried in Derby.

During his life William Bemrose established an extensive collection of porcelain and other objects of art. After his death they were sold at auction in his Derby Home, "Elmhurst", Lonsdale Place, Derby, In March 1909.

Elmhurst was eventually sold on to The Corporation of Derby and became a children's home in the 1940s. The site of the house, now demolished, is close to the site of The Bemrose School, built and Named in Honour of his brother, Henry Howe Bemrose in 1930.

The printing company started by his father in 1826 continued in Derby, employing up to 1,500 staff at its peak until June 2010 when BemroseBooth closed.
