= George John Vulliamy =

British architect

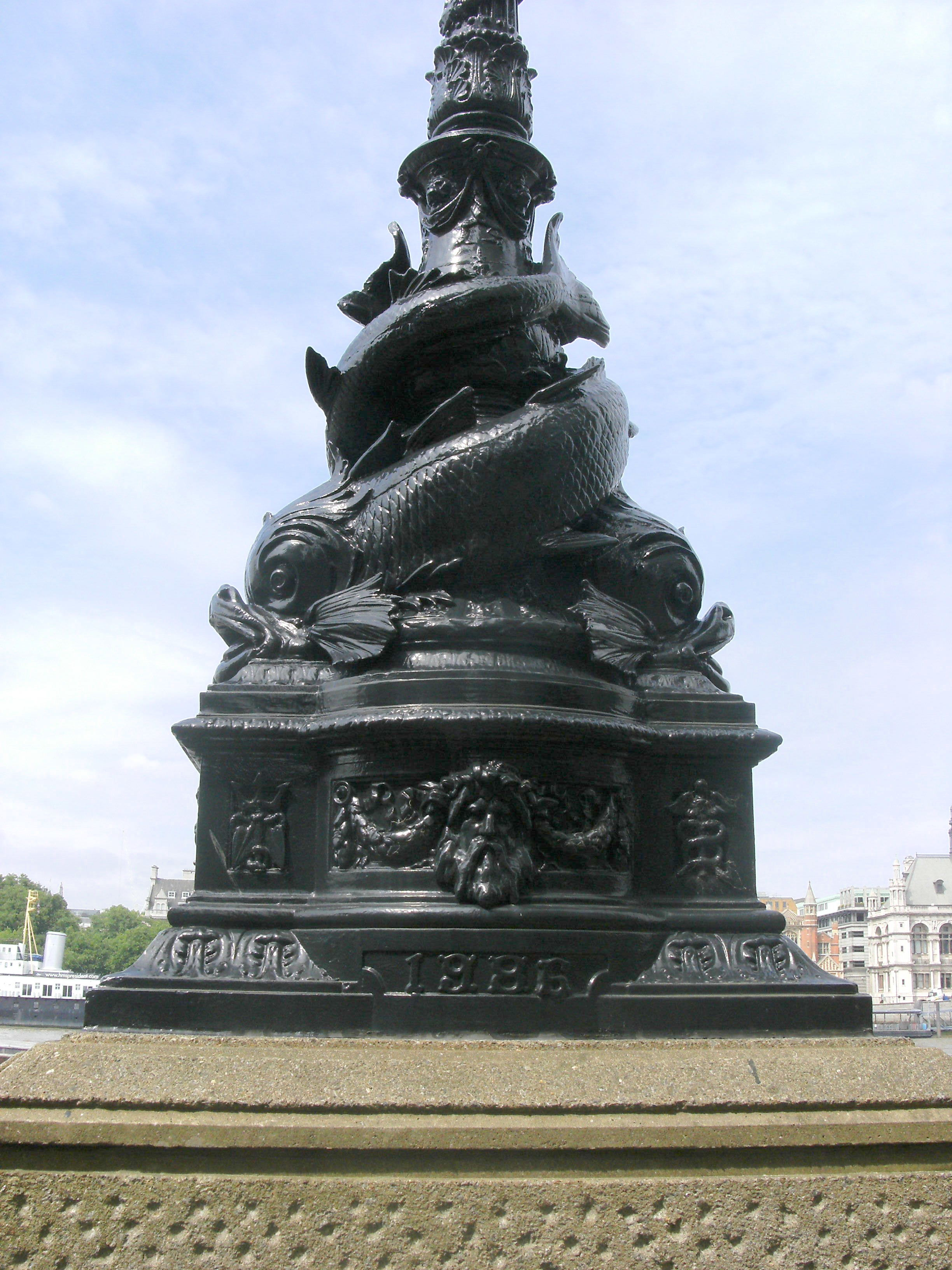
Vulliamy's sturgeon lamp posts are a distinctive feature of the Thames Embankment.

George John Vulliamy (19 May 1817 – 1886) was a British architect who designed some buildings in Victoria Street London, several fire-brigade stations, the pedestal and sphinxes for Cleopatra's Needle on the Thames Embankment, and the sturgeon lamp posts (colloquially "dolphin lamp posts") that line the embankment.

== Biography ==
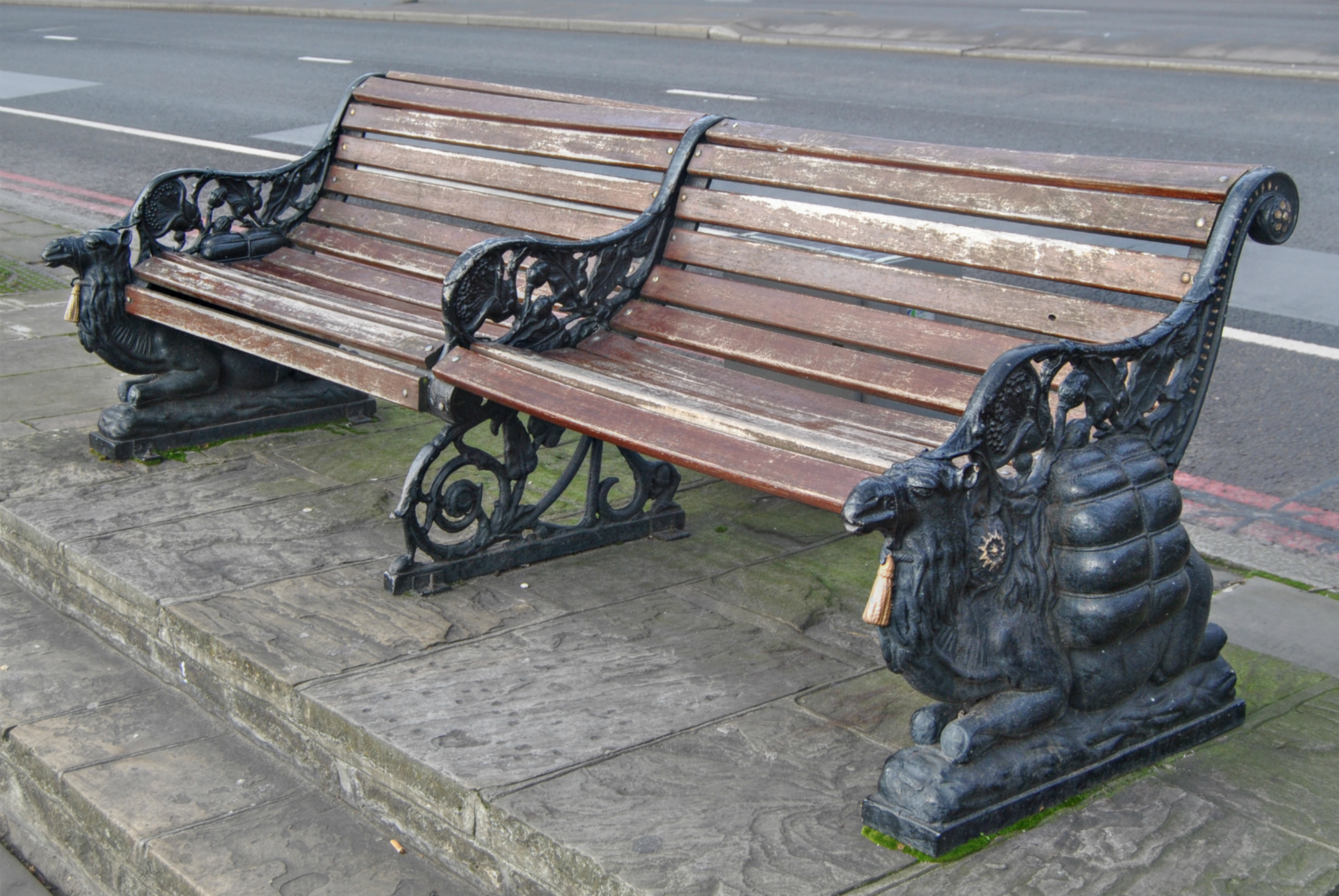
Vulliamy's Camel benches by the Thames Embankment, inspired by his travels to Egypt in the 1840s.

He was the second son of Benjamin Lewis Vulliamy and was born in Pall Mall on 19 May 1817. He was admitted to Westminster School on 13 February 1826, and on leaving was articled to Messrs. Joseph Bramah & Son, engineers, in 1833. In July 1836 he entered the office of Sir Charles Barry, with whom he remained till 1841. He then went abroad, and visited France, Italy, Greece, Asia Minor, and Egypt. While travelling he was employed by Henry Gally Knight to make drawings for his work on the Ecclesiastical Architecture of Italy, 1842–4. Returning to England in 1843, he commenced practising as an architect, and subsequently assisted his uncle, Lewis Vulliamy. He exhibited designs in the Royal Academy in 1838 and in 1845. He erected a mansion at Dyffryn, Monmouthshire, and the Swiss Protestant church in Endell Street (1853). He became a member of the Royal Archæological Institute in December 1848, and acted as secretary for some time. He exhibited objects of interest at the meetings of the institute on several occasions.

On 15 March 1861 he was elected superintending architect to the Metropolitan Board of Works, and thenceforth devoted all his time to the work. He designed for the board some buildings in Victoria Street, several fire-brigade stations, and the pedestal and sphinxes for Cleopatra's Needle on the embankment. He resigned his appointment in May 1886 on account of ill-health, and died at his residence, Ingress House, Greenhithe, on 12 November 1886. He was buried on 17 November at Stone-next-Dartford.

He was a cousin of the art potter Blanche Georgiana Vulliamy.

== See also ==
- Vulliamy family
