= William Duesbury =

English painter

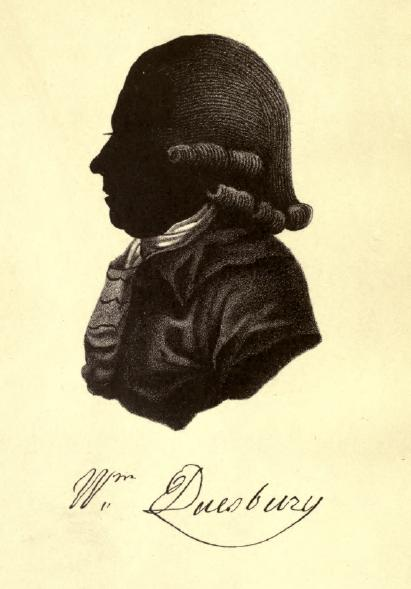
- Silhouette of William Duesbury (18th century).
- Born: William Duesbury; 7 September 1725; Longton Hall, Staffordshire, England
- Died: 30 October 1786 (aged 61); Derby
- Occupation: Fine porcelain manufacture
- Spouse: Sarah James
- Children: William Duesbury (1763–1796)

William Duesbury (1725–1786) was an English enameller, in the sense of a painter of porcelain, who became an important porcelain entrepreneur, founder of the Royal Crown Derby and owner of porcelain factories at Bow, Chelsea, Derby and Longton Hall.

== Biography ==
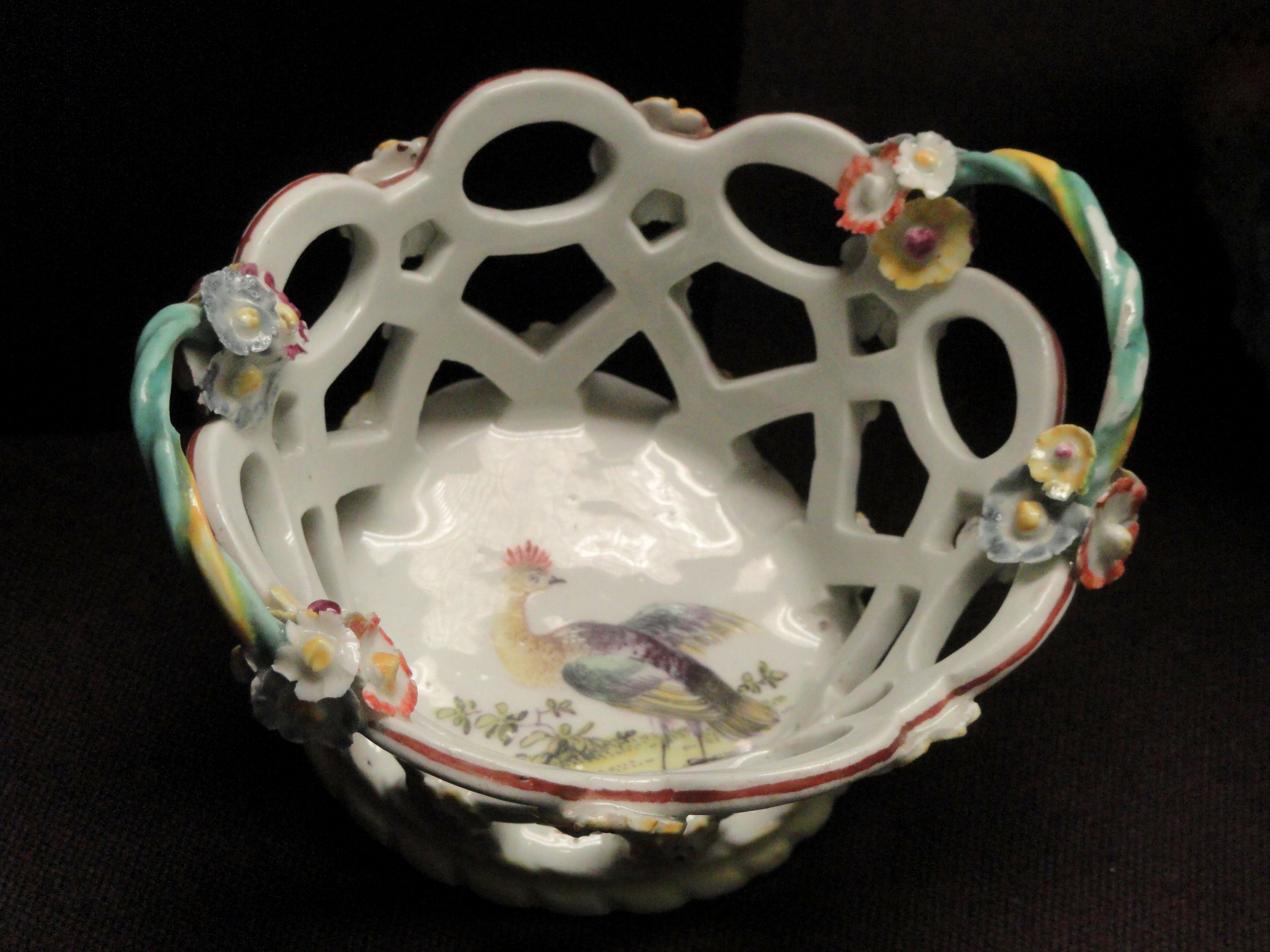
Basket, c. 1758–1760

Duesbury was born on 7 September 1725. to William Duesbury, currier, of Cannock in Staffordshire.

Around 1742 he was working as an "enameller" painting china in London, where he remained until 1753; he decorated Chelsea porcelain and perhaps other wares. Subsequently, between 1754 and 1755, he lived and worked in Longton Hall, where his father lived and where there was a small china works.

On 1 January 1756 he moved with his father to Derby having acquired a share in the Derby potworks on Cockpit Hill with his new partners John Heath and Andrew Planche (1728–1805) a talented French Huguenot potter. Planche did not remain long in the partnership and left Derby. Duesbury with Heath's financial backing opened a new factory on the Nottingham Road. This new venture proved to be a success. A London agent was engaged in April 1757.

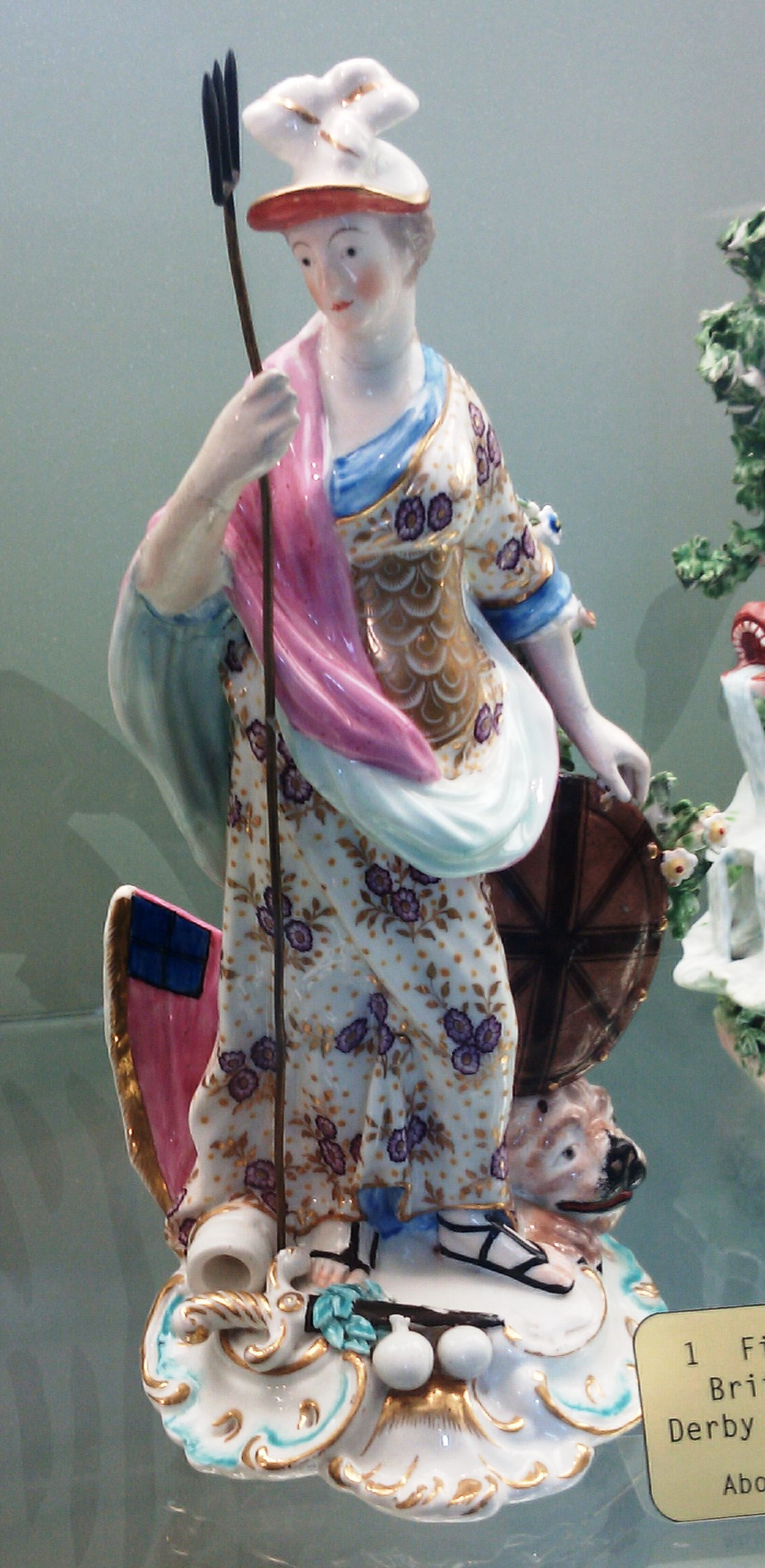
Brittania figure dated 1780 now in Derby Museum

In 1770 Duesbury was able to purchase the failing Chelsea porcelain factory and for the next few years he probably used it to decorate porcelain produced in Derby destined for the London market. He continued the tradition at Chelsea of holding an annual auction. The first was on 17 April 1771 and the three following days, the next in 1773.

In June 1774 he opened a warehouse in London at No. 1 Bedford Street, Covent Garden, and held periodical auctions of his wares at that address and stopped the Chelsea auctions. The ware was announced sometimes as Derby and Chelsea, and sometimes as Chelsea alone; and specimens of the various wares were on permanent view at the warehouse in Bedford Street, Covent Garden.

In March 1775 Duesbury and John Heath were given a Royal Warrant by George III appointing them "China Manufacturers in Ordinary to His Majesty". This allowed them to include a crown on their porcelain mark. The Duesbury "D" was now capped with a crown to record that they were "Derby China Manufacturers to His Majesty". Also in 1775 Duesbury acquired the manufactory of Bow and in 1777 those of Giles's manufactory, Kentish Town, and others.

In 1779 Duesbury faced a severe financial crisis because his business partner Heath went bankrupt. Duesbury managed to survive the crisis and in August 1780 was able to purchase Heath's share of the business from his creditors. He was now the sole proprietor of "the leading porcelain manufacturer in England". In 1783 his business was helped when George, Prince of Wales chose to use Duesbury's wares furnish Carlton House. The next year, 1784, Duesbury centralised all his manufacturing processes in Derby.

Duesbury died of a heart attack on 30 October 1786 at the china factory in Nottingham Road Derby and was buried on 2 November at St Alkmund's Church, Derby. His business passed to his eldest son and partner William Duesbury (1763–1796).

== Memorials ==
In early 2013 Derby City Council and Derby Civic Society announced they would erect a Blue Plaque as a memorial to him at Landau Forte college, in Derby.
