= Blanche Georgiana Vulliamy =

English ceramic artist, painter and writer (1869–1923)

- Born: 1869; Ipswich, Suffolk, England
- Died: 4 August 1923 (aged 53–54); Amersham, Buckinghamshire, England
- Occupations: Ceramic artist, painter, author
- Years active: 1890–1923

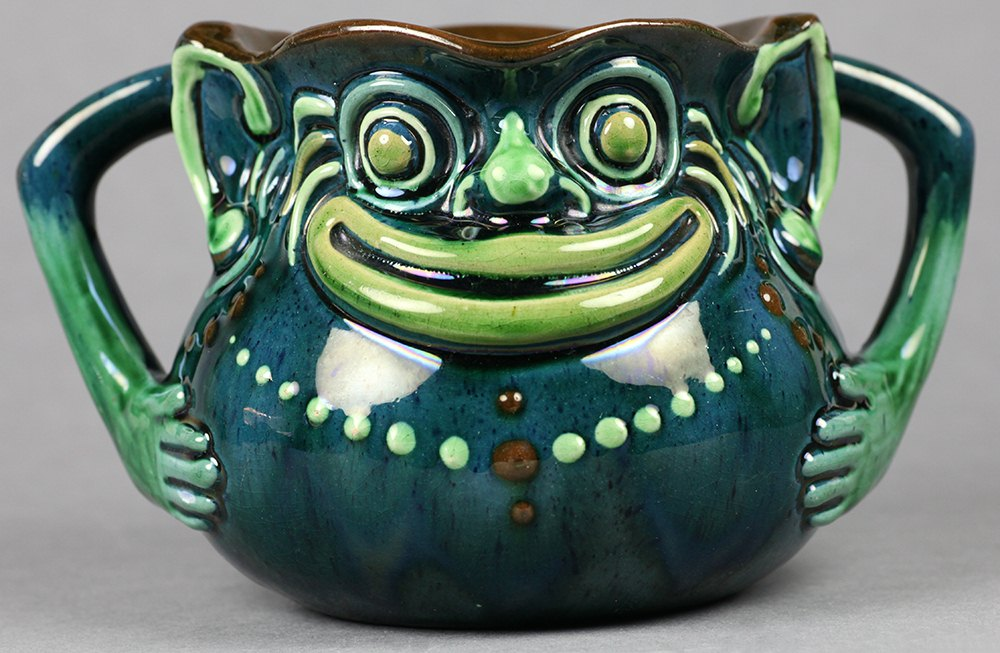
A Torquay Pottery goblin vase by Vulliamy, c. 1905

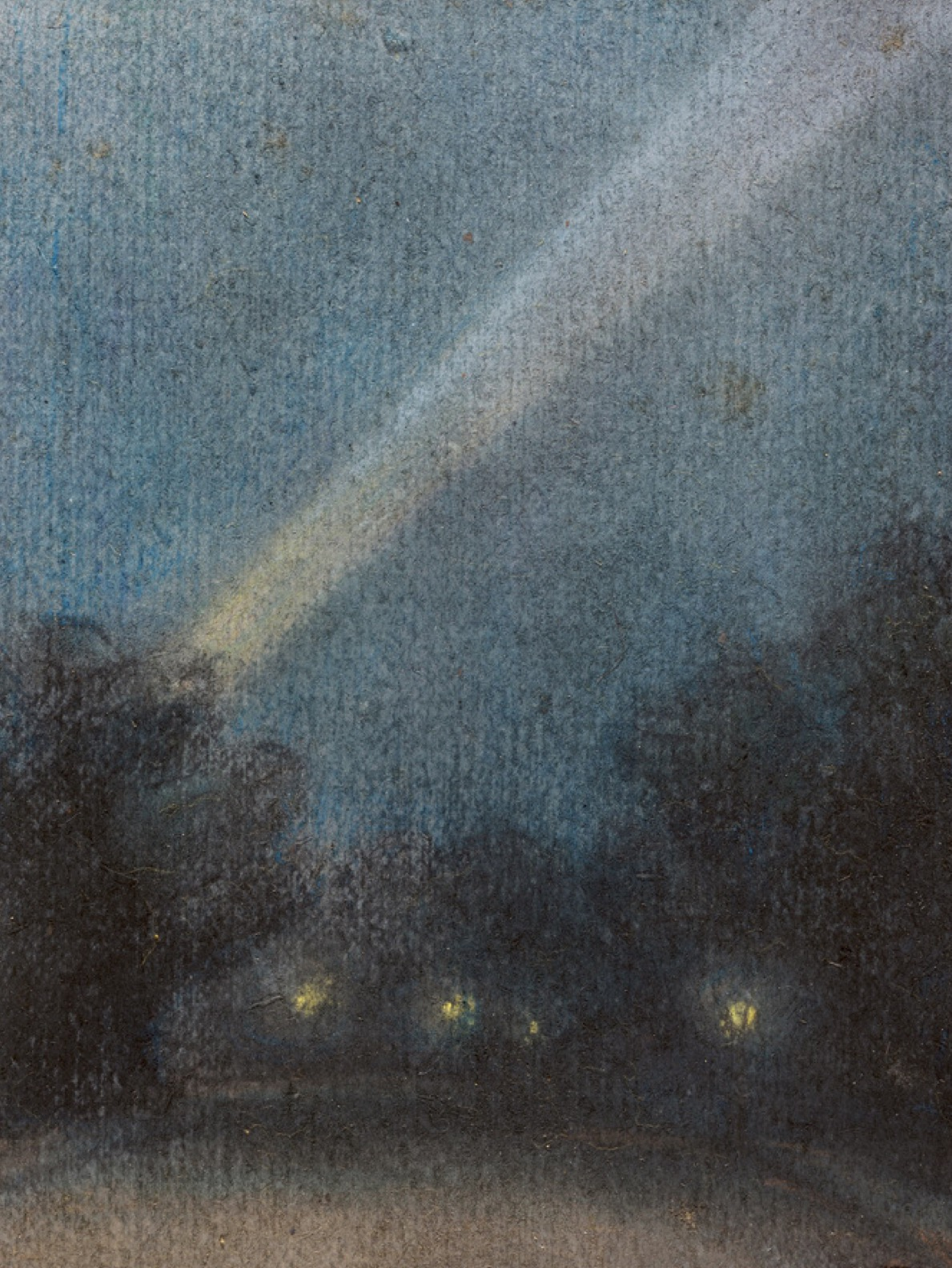
Searchlights in a street at night, pastel by Vulliamy

Blanche Georgiana Vulliamy (1869 – 4 August 1923) was an English ceramic artist, painter, and writer.

Half-Belgian, after training as a portrait artist Vulliamy worked mainly as a designer of art pottery and is best known for her work portraying bats, goblins, and other grotesque creatures. She was also a writer, and at least one of her plays was produced in London.

== Early life ==
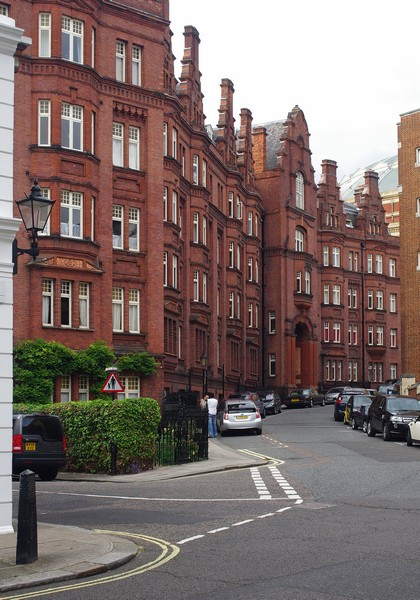
Alexandra House, Kensington Gore

Born in Ipswich, Suffolk, Vulliamy was the daughter of Arthur Frederic Vulliamy (1838–1915), a solicitor, by his marriage in 1864 to Anna Marie Museur, a native of Brussels. She was the fourth of thirteen children and was christened at St John's, Ipswich, on 6 March 1869.

Her father was a nephew of the architect Lewis Vulliamy and the clockmaker Benjamin Lewis Vulliamy and also the first cousin of another architect, George John Vulliamy. Another cousin, Marie Vulliamy (1840–1870), married the poet and novelist George Meredith. Her mother was an amateur artist who exhibited at the Society of Women Artists.

Between the late 1880s and the early 1890s, Vulliamy studied portrait art in London. At the census on 5 April 1891 she was recorded as a 22-year-old art student living at Alexandra House, Kensington Gore. Also known as the Alexandra House for Art Pupils, this had been founded in 1887 by Sir Francis Cook, a fabulously rich great-uncle of Maud Gonne, and one of her contemporaries there was Constance Gore-Booth.

== Work ==
Vulliamy moved to Torquay to live with grandparents, getting to know the pottery industry in South Devon, and in particular the Aller Vale Art Pottery, and other workshops in Barnstaple. In the mid 1890s she began to make grotesque figures from bones and shells, and by 1899 was gaining attention from the world of art as a creator of grotesque pottery. An observer in Artist magazine commented that "The art which this lady has developed offers a curiously exact parallel to the evolution of all art among primitive peoples" and reported that Vulliamy was already selling her work at Liberty's. In the 1901 census she appears at 6 Pitt Street, Kensington, described as a pottery designer aged thirty-one. At a pottery exhibition at Alexandra House in 1904, the Princess of Wales bought some of Vulliamy's Smiley Poggs pottery figures. In the same year, an article on Vulliamy and her work appeared in the New Zealand newspaper The Star, reporting that at 6, Pitt Street, she had both a workshop and a shop, selling her work to passers by.

Vulliamy went on to work for several art pottery factories and was especially fond of portraying bats, goblins, and other reclusive and grotesque creatures, in a wide variety of materials, making wax and clay models to develop her pottery designs. Her goblins were usually shown laughing or grinning, and she herself referred to them as "bogies".

In 1905, an article in The Bystander called Vulliamy "one of the most original of modern artists" and suggested that her "marvellous designs... recall the work of many a mediaeval artist, notably of that unknown genius who sculptured the series commonly known as the Devils of Notre Dame."

She was also an occasional author, and in 1909 her Give Heed, a modern morality play, was performed at the Court Theatre by students of the Guildhall School of Music, the characters in it being Satan, Conscience, Youth (played by Daisy Burrell), Thoughtless Soul, Fashion, Modern Rush, Frivolity, Poverty, Sickness, Sorrow (Evelyn Roberts), Loneliness, Middle-Age, Dame Nature, and Kennel Maid. During the play, a Model T Ford appeared on stage, picked up Modern Rush and Excitement, and drove away up some steps. The Model T was chosen because of its hill climbing ability.

Vulliamy remained unmarried and died at Amersham on 4 August 1923, aged 54.

== Exhibitions ==
An exhibition of Vulliamy's work called "Goblins: the pottery of Blanche Georgiana Vulliamy" was displayed at the Ipswich Museum in April 2001.

The Christchurch Mansion at Ipswich has exhibited its collection of seventy-seven pastels by Vulliamy, showing First World War searchlights flaring through urban streets at night.
