= Derby Porcelain =

English ceramics manufacturer

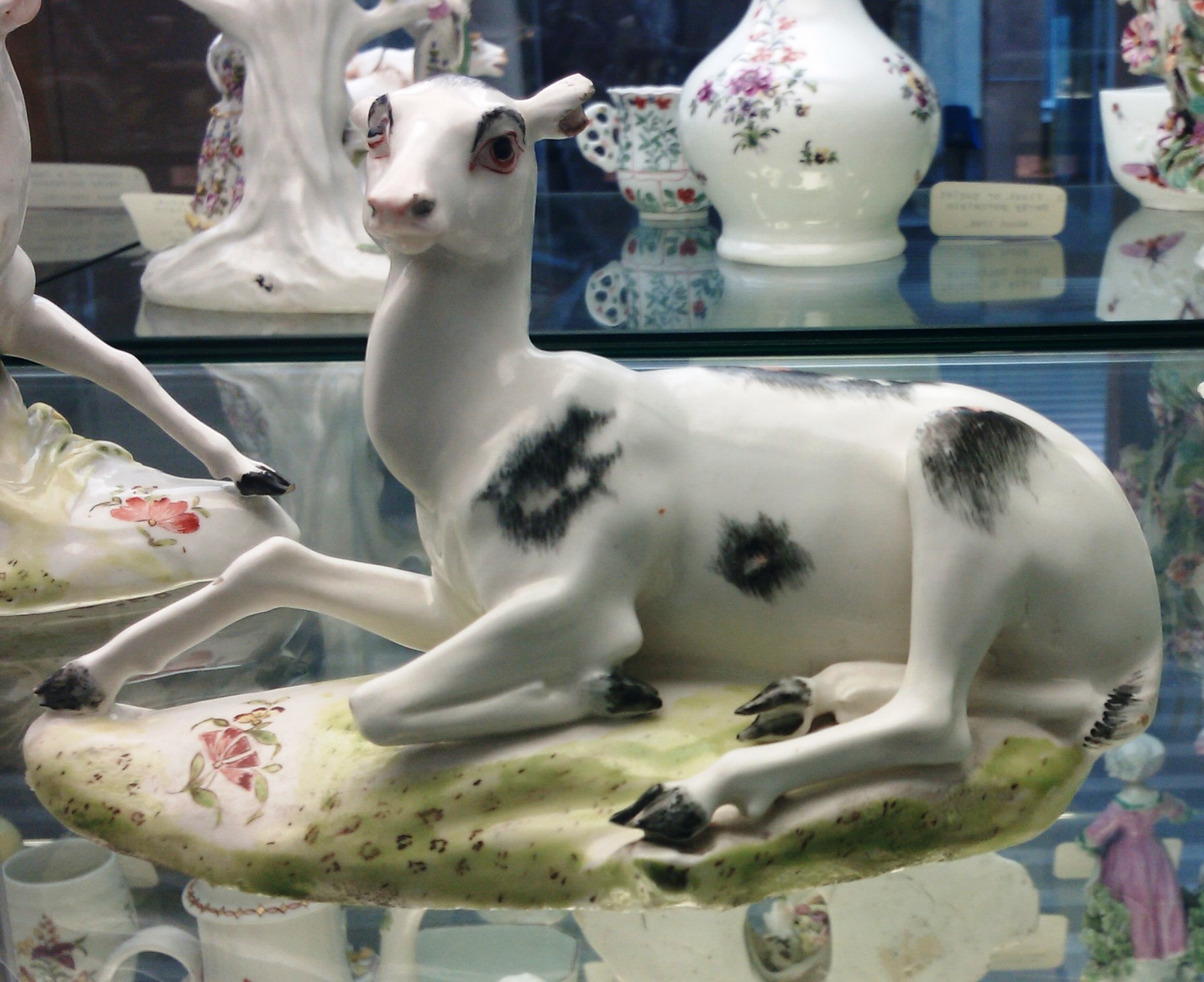
A doe made from Derby porcelain in the 1750s

The production of Derby porcelain dates from the second half of the 18th century, although the authorship and the exact start of the production remains today as a matter of conjecture. The oldest remaining pieces in the late 19th century bore only the words "Darby" and "Darbishire" and the years 1751-2-3 as proof of place and year of manufacture. More important is the fact that the production of porcelain in Derby predates the commencement of the works of William Duesbury, started in 1756 when he joined Andrew Planche and John Heath to create the Nottingham Road factory, which later became the Royal Crown Derby.。

== History ==
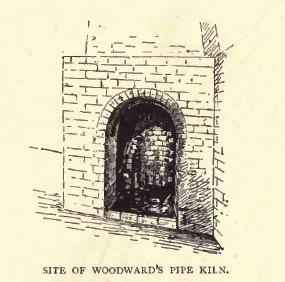
Site of Woodward's pipe kiln, where André Planchè fired his birds, cats, dogs, and sheep.

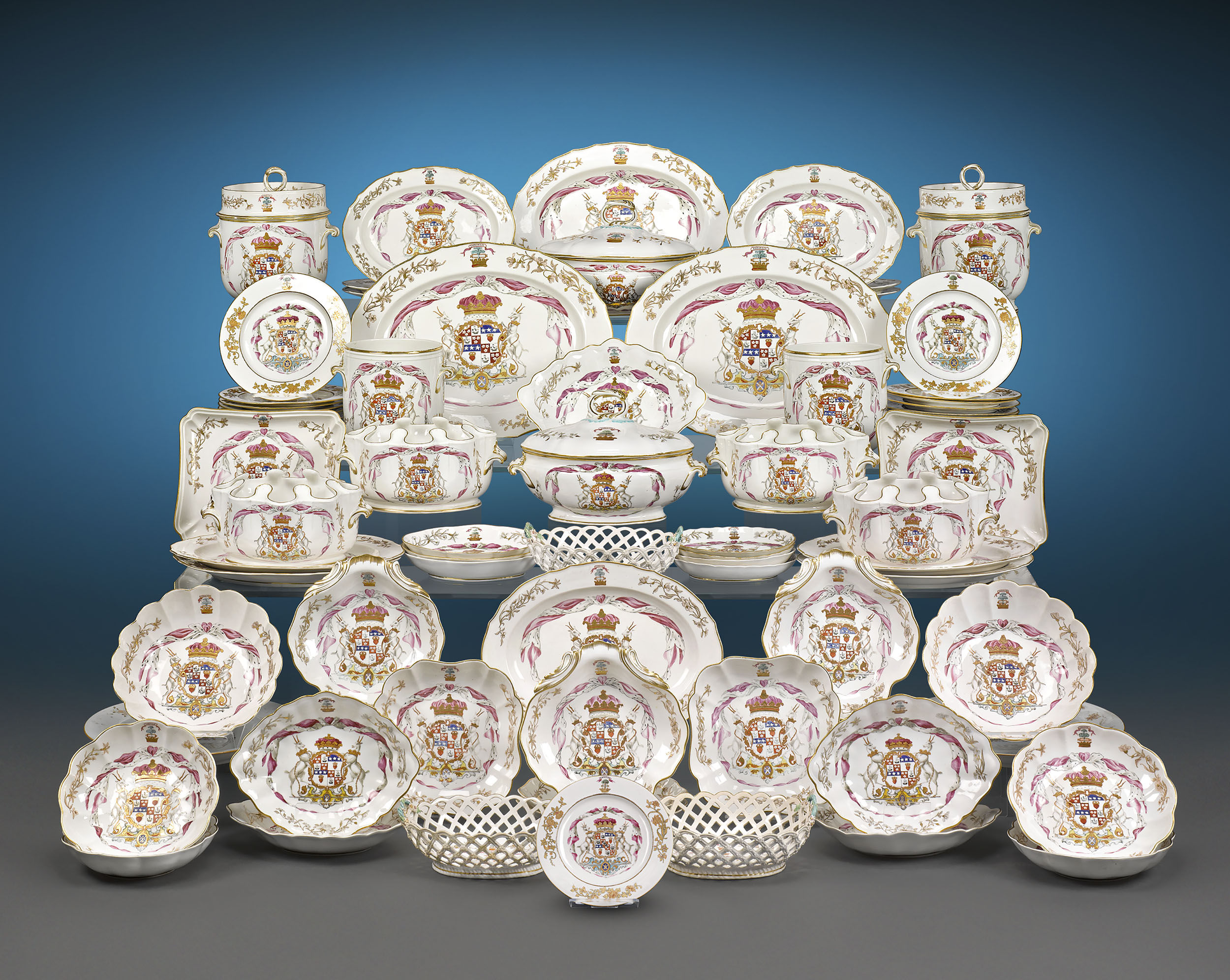
85-piece porcelain dinner service crafted by Derby and Duesbury for the 8th Duke of Hamilton, circa 1780-90

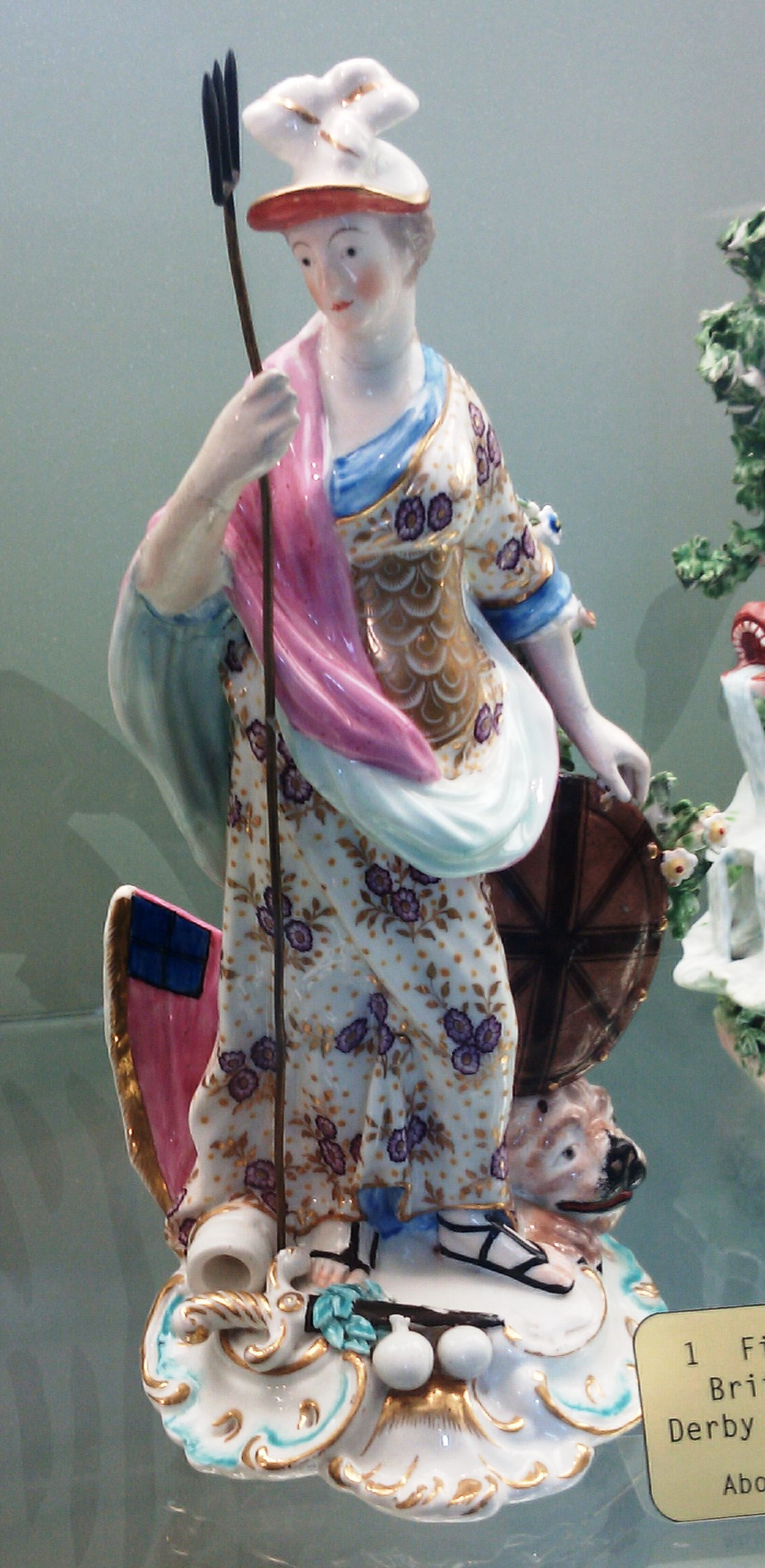
Figure of Britannia made around 1780.

It is known by William Duesbury's own notes, that Derby had a solid production of exceptional quality porcelain in early 1750s. The proof of the quality of locally produced material is evidenced by the fact that Duesbury, then a known enameller in London, have paid considerably more for pieces manufactured in Derby than for figurines made by rival factories in Bow and Chelsea. It was common at the time that dealers purchased white glazed porcelain from various manufacturers, and send it to enamelists like Duesbury to do the final finishing (enamelling and colouring).

The first printed mention about the Derby factory, however, dates only from December 1756, when an advertisement in the Public Advertiser, republished several times throughout the month, urged readers to participate in a sale by auction in London, sponsored by the Derby Porcelain Manufactory. Curiously, there are no other references to this supposed Derby Porcelain Manufactory, which suggests that the name was specifically invented for the occasion. Although it can be seen only as boasting, the advertisement calls the factory a "second Dresden", showing the good quality of their products. Of course, such perfection represented the culmination of a lengthy manufacturing process, and nothing in this announcement indicates that this annual sales had been the first of the factory, unlike what would occur with similar advertisements from manufacturers of Bow and Longton Hall in 1757.

The potter Andrew Planche is often cited as a forerunner of the Derby china factory. Reports about a "foreigner in very poor circumstances" who lived in Lodge Lane and produced small porcelain figures around 1745, may refer to Planchè. However, as pointed out by a researcher, in 1745 Planchè was only 17 years old. The very importance of Planchè to the constitution of the future Royal Crown Derby was minimized by some (as the granddaughter of William Duesbury, Sarah Duesbury, who died in 1876), and contested by others, who doubt his existence. However, there is evidence that Planchè was really a historical figure, although he certainly has not taught the craft of enamelling to William Duesbury.

A serious contender for the title of maker of the porcelain pieces of the second Dresden is the Cockpit Hill Potworks. Historians deduce that this "Derby Pot Works" was already in full operation around 1708, on behalf of a slipware tyg, containing the inscription John Meir made this cup 1708. It is known that the Pot Works produced china, due to the announcement of an auction held in 1780, when the company went bankrupt. No mention is made of enamelled figures, but it is quite likely that they were also built, at a time when demand for these items was high. Or, perhaps, this branch of the works has been fully assimilated by the Duesbury's factory from the second half of 1750s on.

The owners of the Cockpit Hill Potworks were William Butts, Thomas Rivett and John Heath. The banker Heath was the financed the construction of the Nottingham Road factory. The Derby factory in the 18th and 19th centuries maintained high standards, with artists including William Billingsley and Quaker Pegg.
