= Royal Crown Derby =

English porcelain manufacturer

The Royal Crown Derby Porcelain Company Limited
- Trade name: Royal Crown Derby
- Type: Private limited company
- Industry: Pottery
- Founded: Approximately 1750; 276 years ago
- Headquarters: Derby, England
- Key people: Kevin Oakes (CEO)
- Products: Porcelain ceramics
- Owner: Oakes family
- Website: royalcrownderby.co.uk

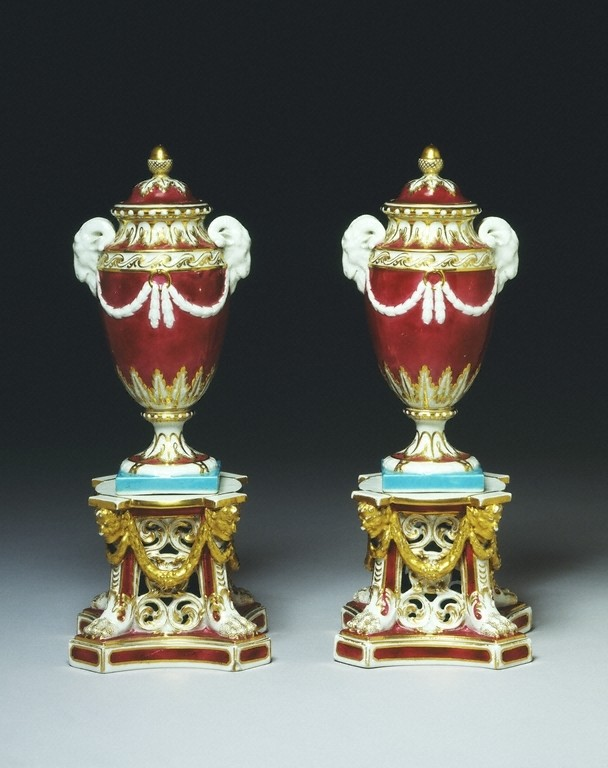
Pair of vases, 1772–1774, Derby Porcelain Factory (V&A Museum no. 485–1875)

Royal Crown Derby is the oldest or second oldest remaining English porcelain manufacturer (disputed by Royal Worcester, which claims 1751 as its year of establishment). Based in Derby, England, the company is particularly noted for its high-quality bone china, having produced tableware and ornamental items since approximately 1750. It was known as 'Derby Porcelain' until 1773, when it became 'Crown Derby', with the 'Royal' appellation being added in 1890.

The Derby Porcelain article covers the earliest history of this and other porcelain producers in 18th-century Derby.

== History ==
=== William Duesbury I and II ===
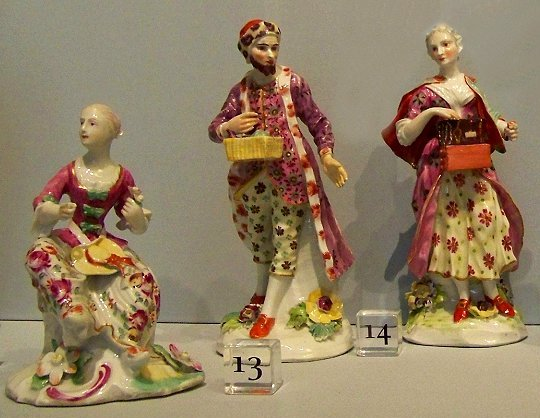
Three figures dated 1758 (now in the Detroit Institute of Arts)

In 1745, André Planché, a Huguenot immigrant from Saxony, settled in Derby, where he made soft-paste porcelain vases and figurines between 1747 and 1755. At the beginning of 1756, he formed a business partnership with William Duesbury (1725–1786), a porcelain painter formerly at Chelsea porcelain factory and Longton Hall, and the banker John Heath. This was the foundation of the Derby company, although production at the works at Cockpit Hill, just outside the town, had begun before then, as evidenced by a creamware jug dated 1750 that is in the possession of the Victoria and Albert Museum.

Planché left the partnership early on, and the business was developed by Duesbury and Heath, and later by Duesbury alone. A talented entrepreneur, Duesbury developed a new body which contained glass frit, soapstone and calcined bone. This enabled the factory to begin producing high-quality tableware. He quickly established Derby as a leading manufacturer of dinner services and figurines by employing the best talents available for modelling and painting. Figure painting was done by Richard Askew, particularly skilled at painting cupids, and James Banford. Zachariah Boreman and John Brewer painted landscapes, still lifes, and pastorals. Intricate floral patterns were designed and painted by William Billingsley.

In 1770, Duesbury further increased the already high reputation of Derby by his acquisition of the famous Chelsea porcelain factory in London. From this point, the Derby paste included bone ash. He operated the Chelsea factory on its original site until 1784 (the products of this period are known as 'Chelsea-Derby'), when he demolished the buildings and transferred the assets, including the stock, patterns and moulds, and many of the workmen, to Derby. In 1776, he acquired the remainder of the formerly prestigious Bow porcelain factory, of which he also transferred the portable elements to Derby.

In 1773, Duesbury's hard work was rewarded by King George III, who granted him permission to incorporate the royal crown into the Derby backstamp, after which the company was known as 'Crown Derby'. In 1786, William Duesbury died and left the company to his son, William Duesbury II (1763–1796), also a talented director, who besides keeping the reputation of the company at its height, developed a number of new glazes and body types.

=== Michael Kean ===
William Duesbury II did not live to fulfil his promise – he died in 1797 at the age of 34, and the company was taken over by his business partner, an Irishman named Michael Kean, who later married Duesbury's widow. He seems not to have enjoyed good relations with the highly skilled workforce, and many eminent artists left. Others however produced good work under his management, including Moses Webster, a flower painter who replaced Billingsley, Richard Dodson (who specialised in birds), George Robertson (land- and seascapes) and Cuthbert Lawton (hunting scenes).

The best-known artist of this time was William Pegg, a Quaker, famed for his striking and idiosyncratic flower painting. He started in 1797 but his religious beliefs led him to the conclusion that painting was sinful and he left in 1800. He returned in 1813, but left again in 1820. Despite much good work, the Kean period was disruptive and the company suffered financially.

William Duesbury III, born in 1790, son of William Duesbury II, took over the factory when he came of age, and Kean having sold his interest to his father-in-law, William Duesbury's grandfather, named Sheffield, the concern continued under the name of Duesbury & Sheffield.

=== Robert Bloor ===
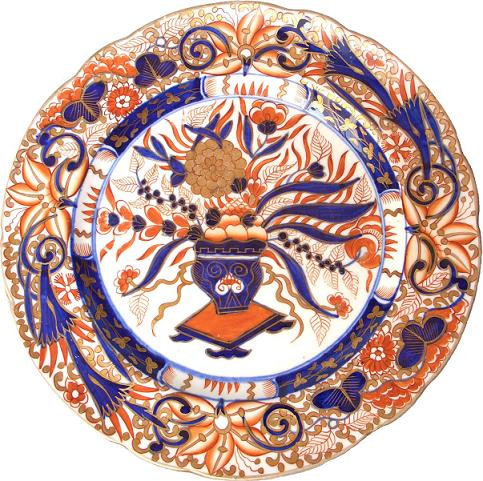
Crown Derby Imari plate, 19th century

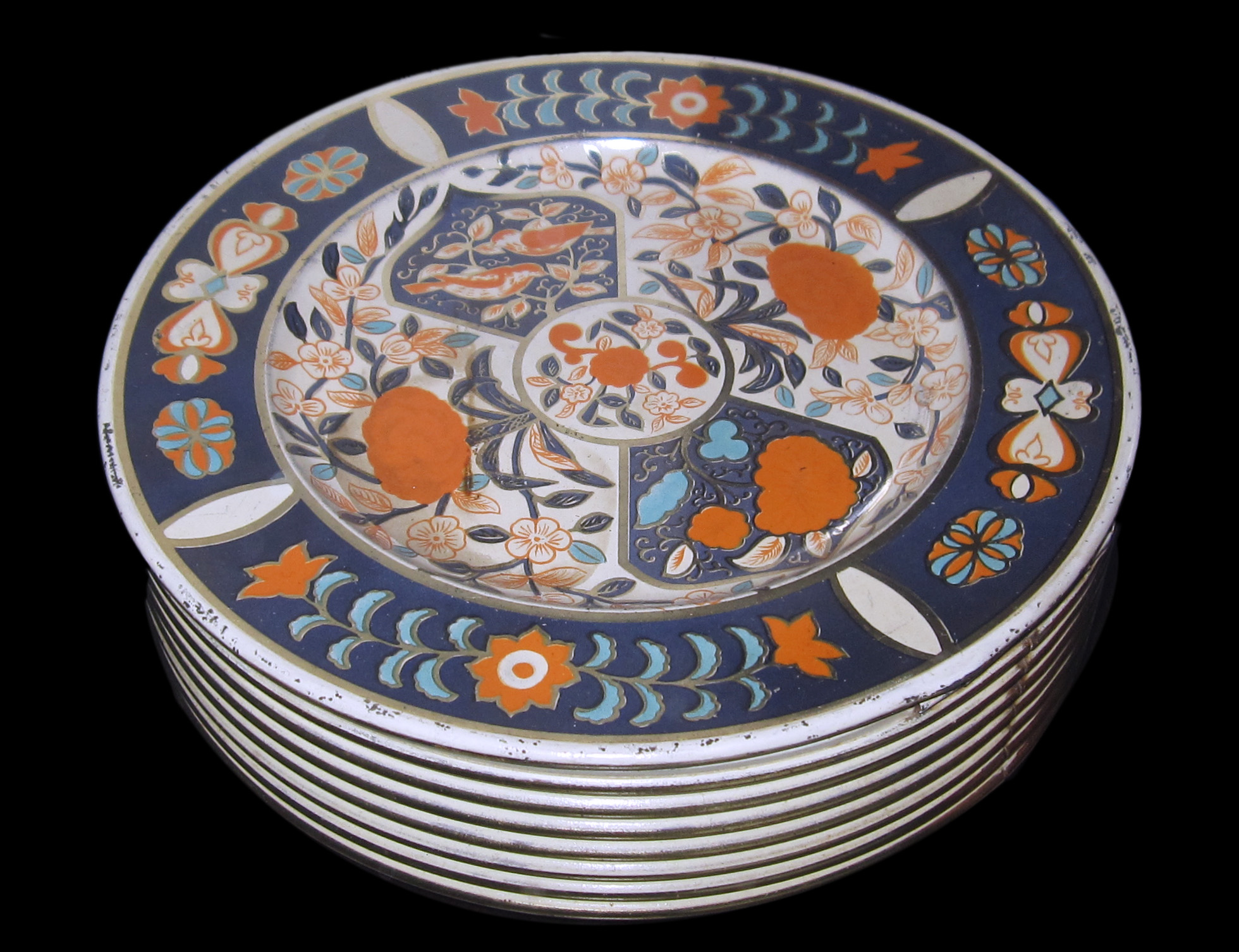
Biscuit tin in the shape of a stacked pile of Derby porcelain plates, made by Hudson Scott & Sons for Huntley & Palmers, 1906

In 1815, the factory was leased to the firm's salesman and clerk, Robert Bloor, and the Duesburys played no further part in it. Bloor borrowed heavily to be able to make the payments demanded but proved himself to be a highly able businessman in his ways of recouping losses and putting the business back on a sound financial footing. He also possessed a thorough appreciation of the aesthetic side of the business, and under him the company produced works that were richly coloured and elegantly styled, including brightly coloured Japanese Imari patterns, generally featuring intricate geometric patterns layered with various floral designs. These designs proved extremely and lastingly popular, and Derby continued to thrive.

In 1845, however, Bloor died, and after three years under Thomas Clarke, the Cockpit Works were sold and the factory closed in 1848.

=== Hiatus: the King Street Factory ===
A group of six former employees, led by William Locker, set up a factory in King Street in Derby in 1848, under Sampson Hancock (1817–1898) who had worked as a flower painter. They continued to use the moulds, patterns and trademarks of the former business, although not the name. No mechanical processes were used, and no two pieces produced were exactly the same. Among the items preserved was the original potter's wheel of the Duesburys, still owned by the present Royal Derby Company.

=== Osmaston Road ===
In 1877, an impressive new factory was built by new owners of the Crown Derby name in Osmaston Road, Derby, thus beginning the modern period of Derby porcelain. Crown Derby's patterns became immensely popular during the late Victorian era, as their romantic and lavish designs exactly met the popular taste of the period.

=== Royal Crown Derby ===
In 1890, Queen Victoria appointed Crown Derby to be "Manufacturers of porcelain to Her Majesty" and by royal warrant granted them the title "The Royal Crown Derby Porcelain Company". In 1935, Royal Crown Derby acquired the King Street factory, thus reuniting the two strands of the business.

=== 1960s onwards ===
In 1964, the company was acquired by S. Pearson and Son and became part of the Allied English Potteries Group, later to be joined by Royal Doulton.

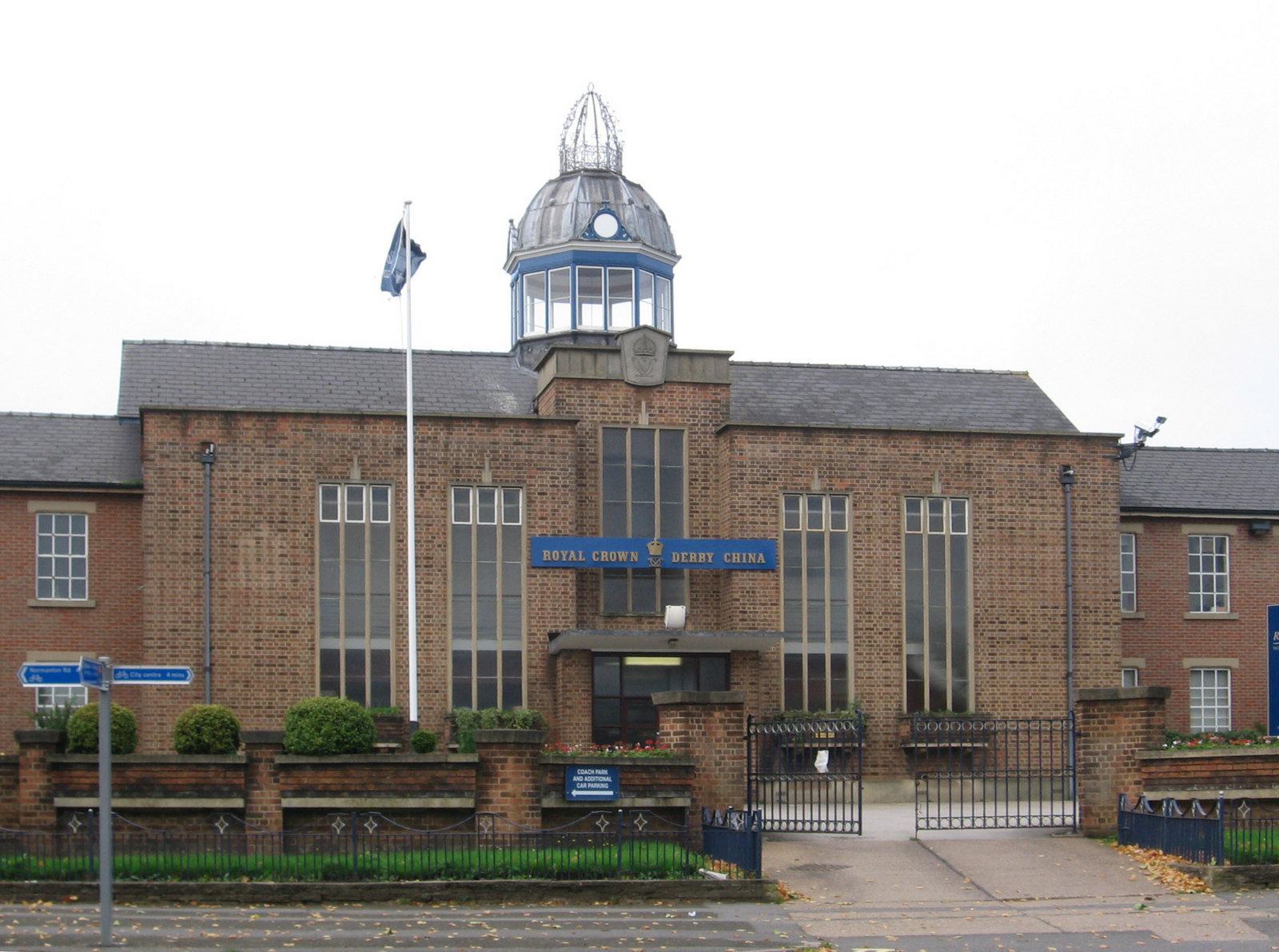
Front of the factory

In 2000, Hugh Gibson, a former director of Royal Doulton and a member of the Pearson family, led a buy-out, making Royal Crown Derby once again an independent and privately owned concern, which in 2006 employed about 300 people at the Osmaston Road works.

In 2013, Hugh Gibson retired and sold the company to Steelite International of Stoke-on-Trent. The Derby factory and visitor centre remain open. According to the Royal Crown Derby website, Steelite "remains firmly committed to the highest quality UK manufacture and sets its sights on launching into a new market with a new brand 'Royal Crown Derby Entertains' providing fine bone china tableware to major hotels restaurants and hospitality venues throughout the world."

In 2016, the company was bought by Kevin Oakes, formerly chief executive of both Crown Derby and Steelite.

== Derby porcelain marks ==
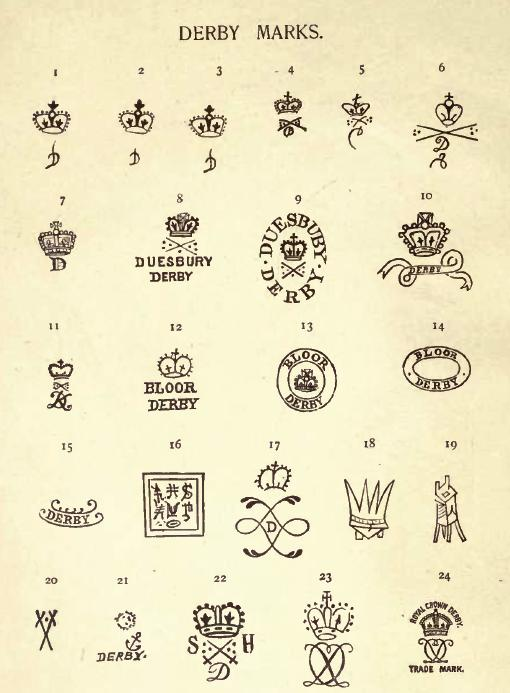
Marks made to Derby china.

From the book Bow, Chelsea, and Derby Porcelain by William Bemrose (1898):

- 1, 2, 3 - Earliest Derby Marks, generally in blue (some examples are known where the Crown and D are used separately, probably an oversight by the workmen).
- 4 - Crossed swords, crown, and D, and 6 dots, carefully painted in blue, later in puce, used from about 1782.
- 5, 6 - Ditto, less carefully painted in red.
- 7, 8, 9, 10 - Later Duesbury Marks, generally in red.
- 11 - Duesbury & Kean, seldom used, circa 1795 to 1809.
- 12, 13, 14, 15 - Bloor Marks, commence 1811 to 1849.
- 16, 17, 18, 19 - Quasi Oriental Marks used on several occasions in matching, and to use up seconds stock by Bloor. No. 17 is an imitation of the Sèvres mark.
- 20 - Dresden Mark, often used on figures.
- 21 - Derby Mark, supposed to have been used by Holdship when at Derby, about 1766. Rare.
- 22 - Stephenson & Hancock, King Street Factory, 1862, same mark used afterwards by Sampson Hancock, and now in use, 1897.
- 23 - Mark used by the Derby Crown Porcelain Co., Osmaston Road, from its establishment in 1877 to Dec., 1889.
- 24 - This Mark adopted by the above Co. when Her Majesty granted the use of the prefix "Royal" on 3 January 1890.

== Royal Crown Derby Visitor Centre ==
The Royal Crown Derby Visitor Centre in Derby features a museum of porcelain items, and offers tours of the factory, a gift shop and a restaurant. It is currently closed for the foreseeable future.

== See also ==
- John Haslem (1808–1884), an apprentice china painter at the factory from 1822, and said to be one of the best flower artists at the works. He also wrote a history entitled "The Old Derby China Factory" (George Bell, 1876).
- Georg Holtzendorff, a German painter who made the studies for the Gladstone Dessert Service.
