= Edward Pocock =

Edward Pocock may refer to:

- Edward Pococke (1604–1691), English Orientalist and biblical scholar
- Edward Pocock (artist), (1842-1905), English artist and illustrator
- Edward Innes Pocock (1855–1905), Scottish rugby union player
- Ted Pocock (Edward Robert Pocock, 1934–2013), Australian public servant and diplomat
