= William England =

British photographer (died 1896)

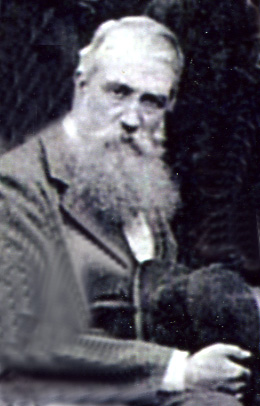
William England in 1886

William England (died 1896) was a successful Victorian photographer specialising in stereoscopic photographs.

== Life ==
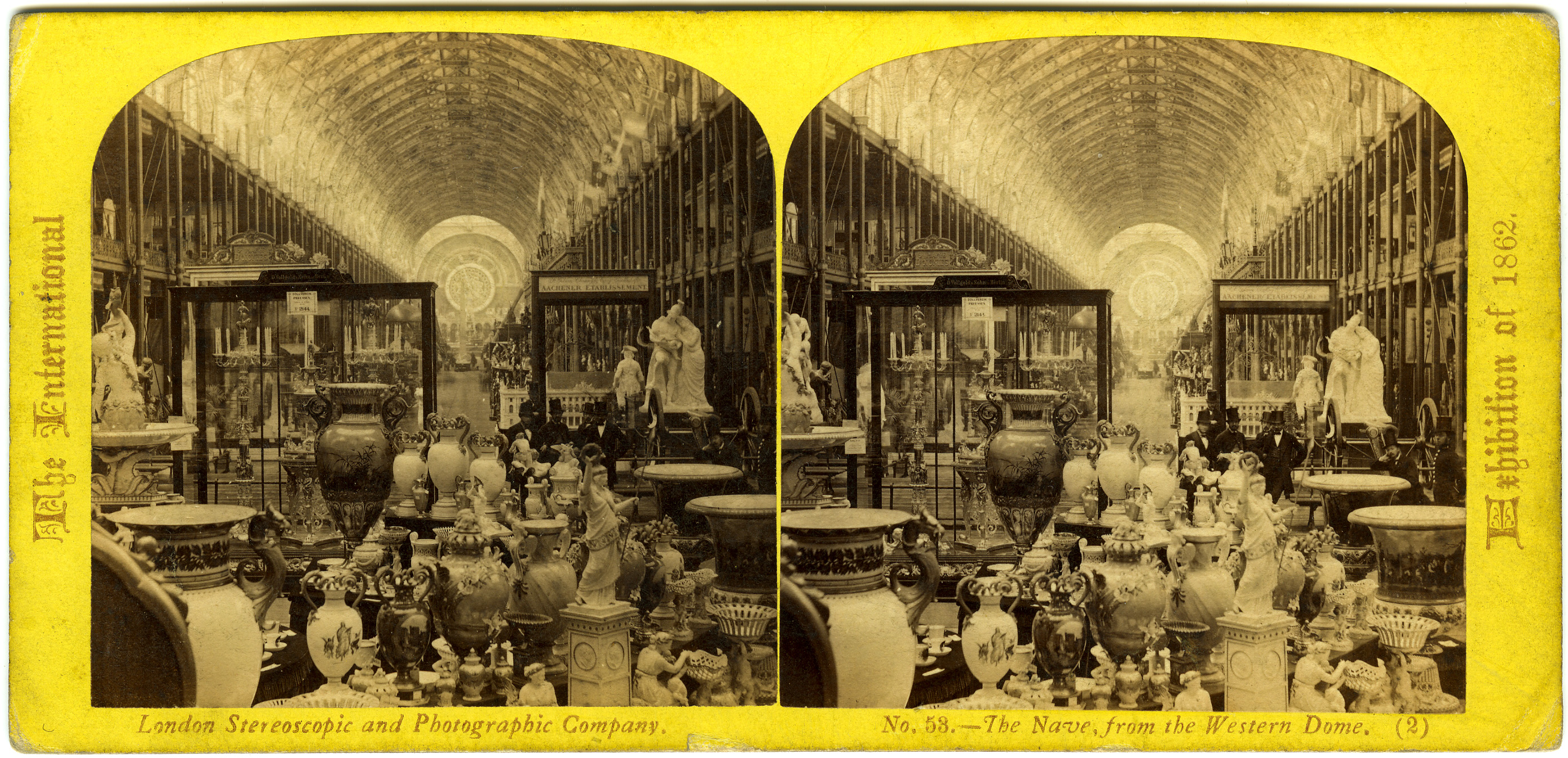
The nave from the Western Dome. A stereoscopic view of the 1862 International Exhibition by William England published by the London Stereoscopic Company

Sources disagree on his date of birth, with dates from 1816 to 1830 quoted by different authors. In the 1840s England ran a London daguerreotype portrait studio. In 1854 he joined the London Stereoscopic Company (LSC), where another eminent stereoscopic photographer Thomas Richard Williams was also active at that time. In due course England became the LSC's principal photographer. In 1859 he traveled to America for the LSC and brought back a series of stereoviews of USA and Canada which provided European audiences with some of their first stereoscopic views of North America. In 1862 the LSC paid 3,000 guineas for the exclusive rights to photograph the International Exhibition to be held in South Kensington, London. England led a team of LSC stereographers, which included William Russell Sedgfield and Stephen Thompson, to produce a series of 350 stereoviews of the exhibition.

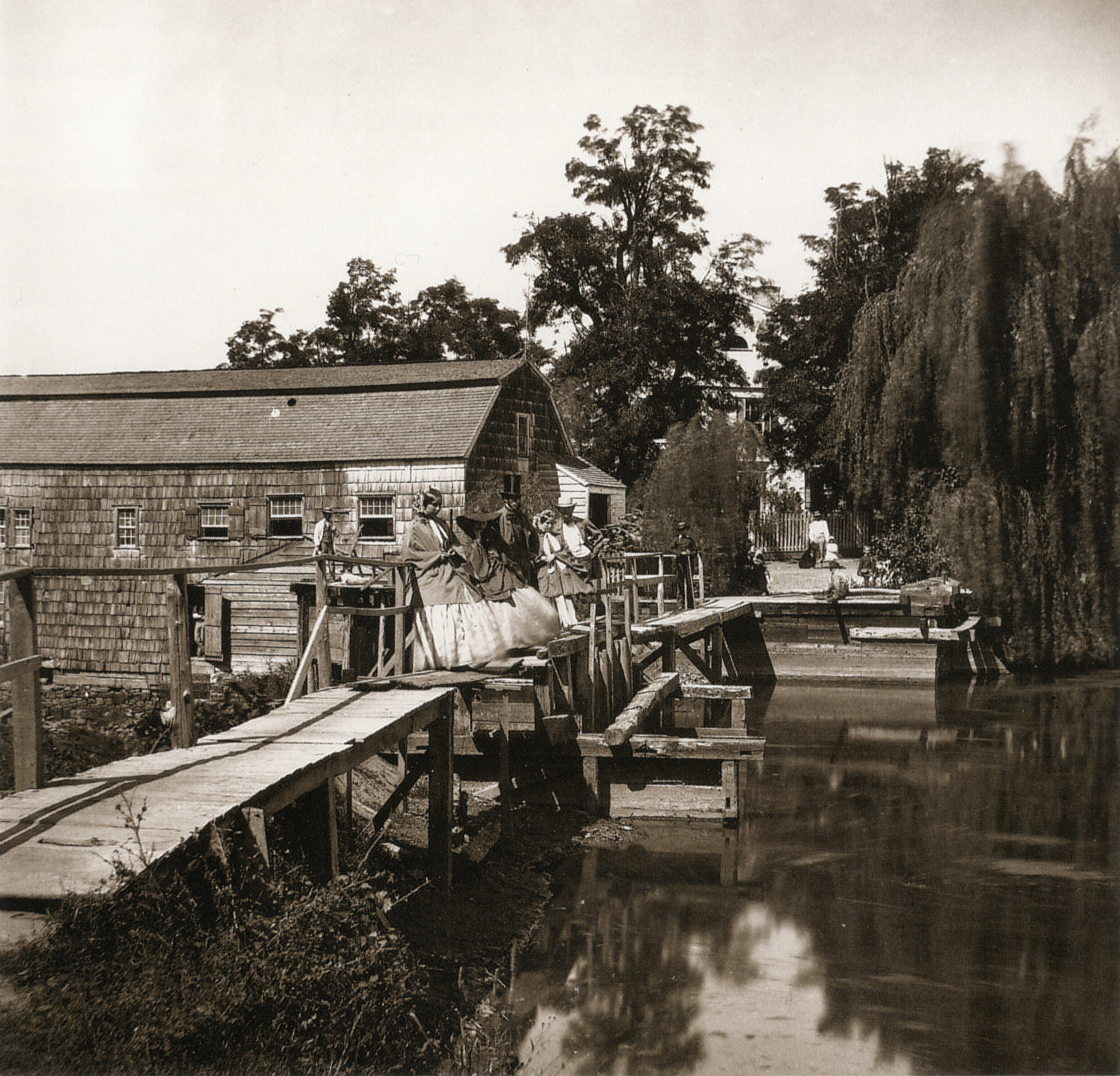
William England's 1859 stereoview of the historic mill and millpond at Philipsburg Manor House in Beekman Town (now Sleepy Hollow, New York)

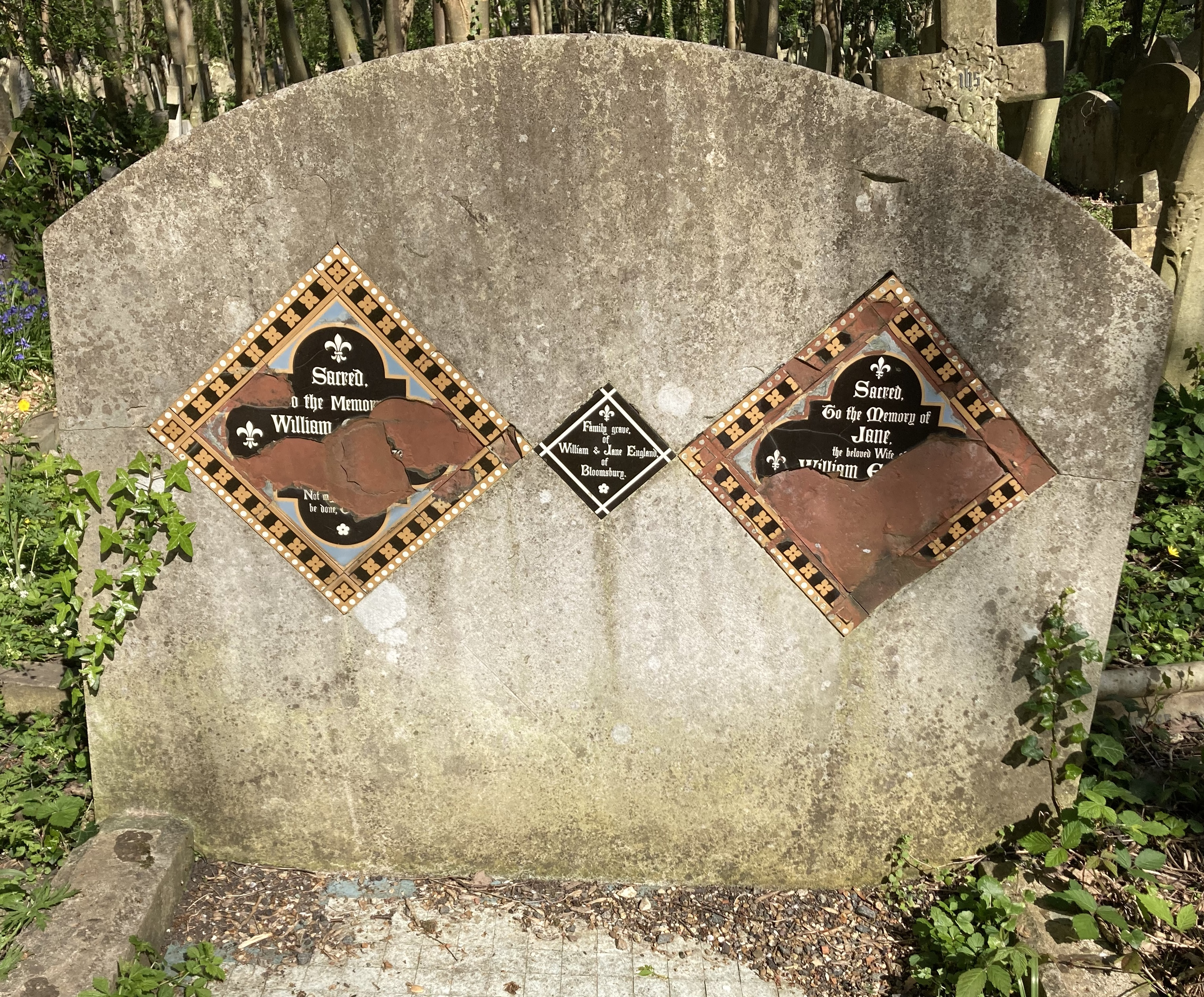
Family grave of William England in Highgate Cemetery

In 1863 William England photographed the Dublin International Exhibition, but later that year he left the LSC to work independently. He subsequently traveled around Germany, Switzerland and Italy, producing highly regarded series of views including a much collected series of Alpine views 'published under the auspices of the Alpine Club'.

In later years England was active in several photographic organizations including the London Photographic Society and the Photographic Society of Great Britain. In 1886, he was a founding member of the Photographic Convention of the United Kingdom.

England died in London in 1896 and was buried in a family grave on the eastern side of Highgate Cemetery.
