= Thomas Richard Williams =

British professional photographer

Thomas Richard Williams (5 May 1824 – 5 April 1871) was a British professional photographer and one of the pioneers of stereoscopy.

Williams's first business was in London around 1850. He is known for his celebrated stereographic daguerreotypes of the Crystal Palace. He also did portrait photography, now in the Getty Museum's archives, which he regarded as his greatest success.

== Early life ==
Dr. Brian May, CBE, and Elena Vidal are the two most prominent researchers on TR Williams. They have published several biographies in various journals and on the web, notably on the London Stereoscopic Company website and in their 2009 book, A Village Lost and Found, which details 59 of TR Williams' stereo photographs. In fact, most of what is known today about him can be attributed to their extensive and thorough research and publications. Prior to their research, only one printed paragraph about him existed, and their book is now the source to look to for collected biographical information.

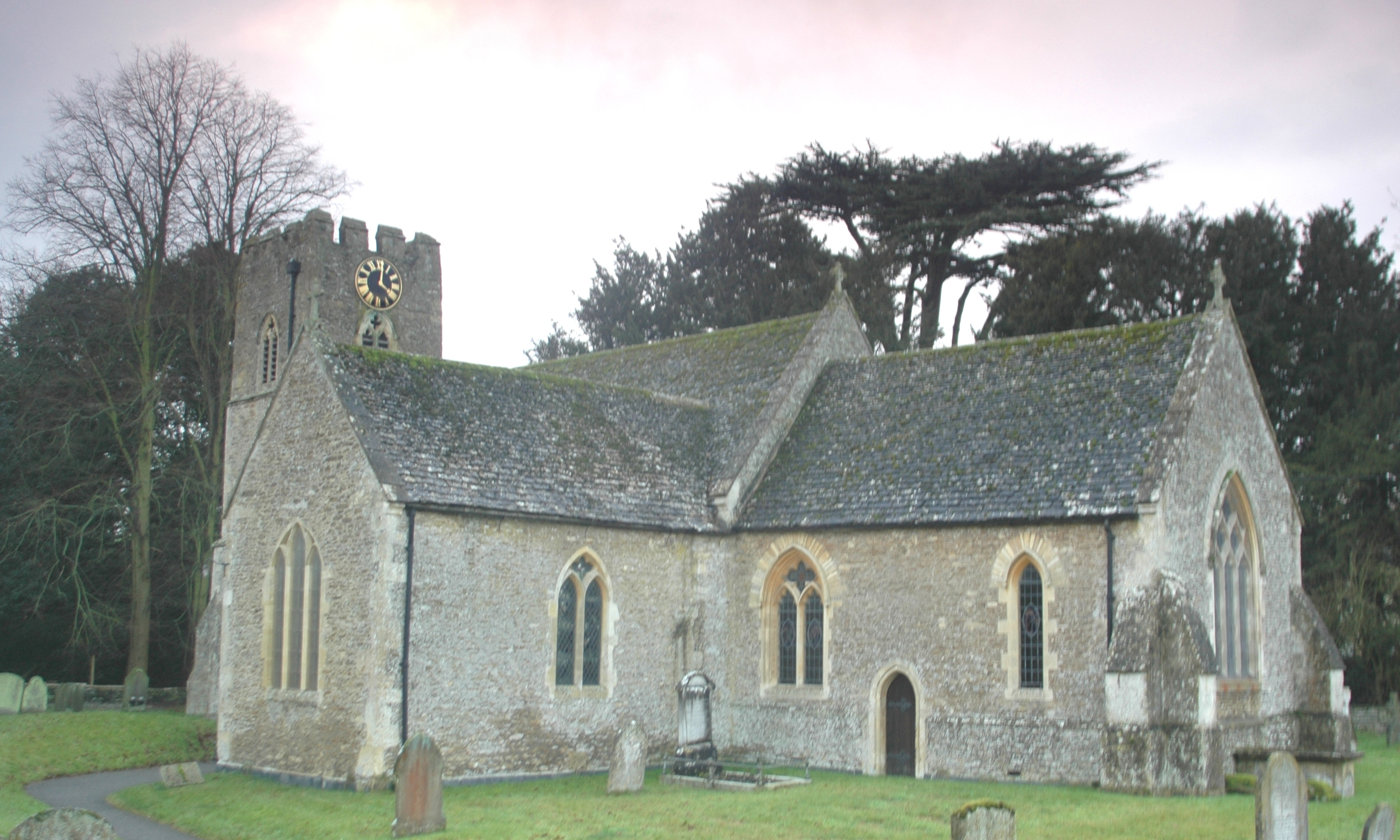
Hinton Waldrist, where Williams spent a good part of his youth.

Not much is known of his early childhood or family life before he was apprenticed to Antoine Claudet, renowned photographer and inventor, in the 1840s. He was born in Blackfriars, London on 5 May 1824. Thomas Williams, his father, co-owned and operated a family coach-driving business with service from London to Reading, a company which was eventually dissolved. Other than that, and that he preferred to be called "T. R." to "Thomas," research on his early life has turned up little. It seems reasonable, however, that he may have spent good portions of his childhood in the village of Hinton Waldrist in Berkshire (now Oxfordshire), which later became a favourite subject of many of his surviving photographs, and a place for which he expressed in his work and writing a great deal of fondness.

May and Vidal write: “Williams’ talent soon became apparent, and he quickly worked his way through the ranks, from book-keeper and assistant in the reception room to operator. He could not have had a better teacher: Claudet was not only an excellent photographer but a very active innovator, always experimenting with new materials and techniques. Claudet realised that photography was still in its infancy, and dedicated himself to the pursuit of excellence in this new discipline:

“‘The discovery of a new art founded upon some startling facts in science, however perfect it may appear at the beginning, and little subject to improvement, rarely remains long stationary; and still more rarely can we foresee all its useful applications.’ (A. Claudet, The Progress and Present State of the Daguerreotype Art, 1845)

"Claudet’s interest in stereography proved to be a key element in Williams's choice of career. Binocular vision had fascinated scientists for centuries. In the 19th century, Elliot and Wheatstone studied the subject, and made the first instruments to view stereoscopic drawings as early as 1832."

Claudet's inventions and instruments, which placed two near-identical images side by side, where they could then be seen using the world's first "3-D" viewers, fascinated Williams as he learned the trade. During his apprenticeship, he learned and developed his own ideas regarding the potential of the art. Photography was relatively new itself, daguerreotype being the primary medium, with wet colloidal processes coming along later. Williams "acquired a sound technical command of all the various operations involved in the production of daguerreotypes," according to May and Vidal.

Williams' family grew quite quickly. Shortly following his marriage in 1847 to Elizabeth Gorfin, she gave birth to their first daughter, Elisabeth Mary. Their family soon expanded to include twelve children, four of whom died in infancy.

Williams left Claudet's employ in the years following his marriage, most likely due to the increasing needs of his growing family. It is speculated he worked for renowned photographer Richard Beard after leaving Claudet, but research has yet to turn up anything definitive on that point.

He had, however, established his own photography business by 1851.

== Middle years and success ==
In 1851, Hyde Park saw The Great Exhibition in The Crystal Palace. While attending the exhibition, Williams was able to take high quality daguerreotypes of the interior of the Palace, some of which survive today. It is doubtful, but unknown, whether they were ever made available to the public.

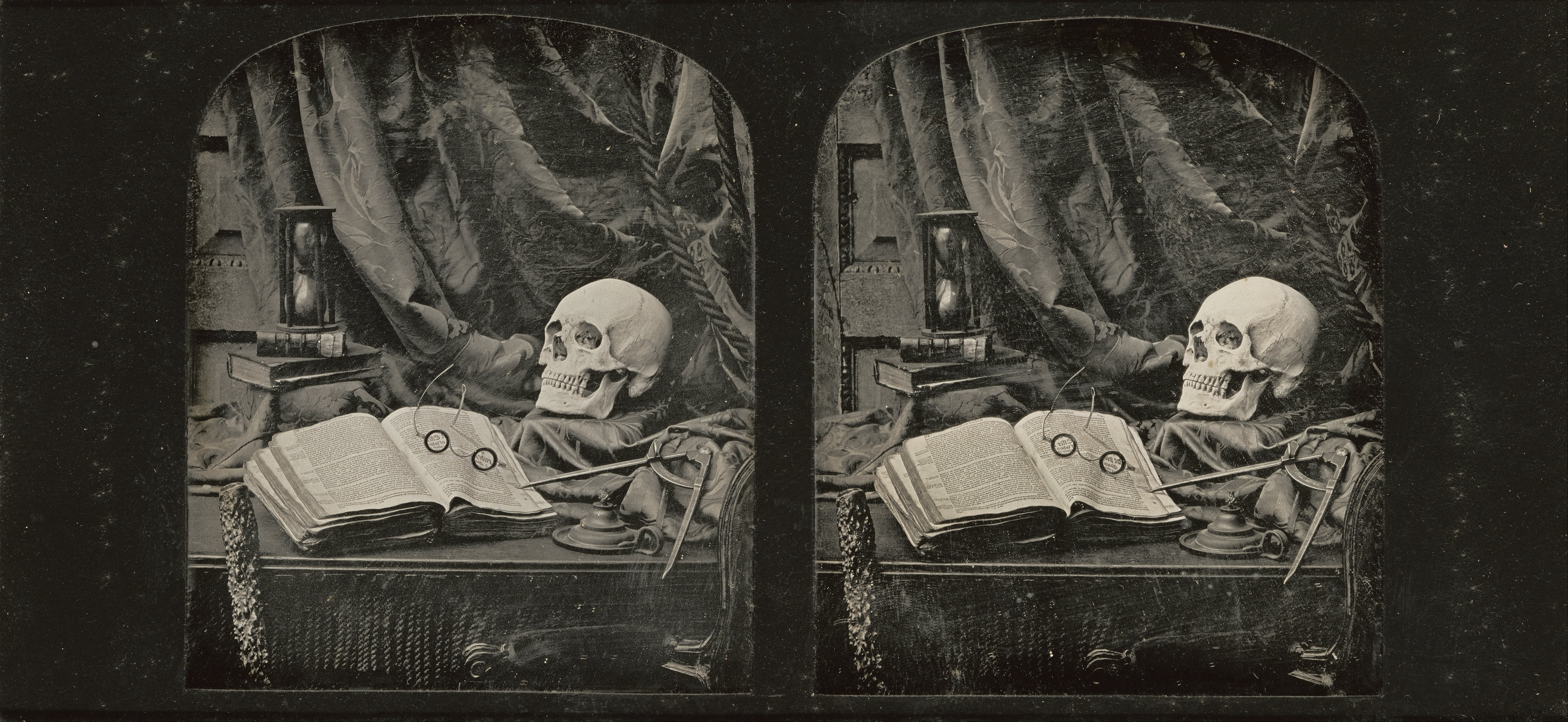
The Sands of Time, a Williams daguerreotype stereograph (1850 - 1852)

May and Vidal write, of this event: "1851... marked the coming of age of stereoscopic photography. Although many of the pioneers of photography in Britain and abroad had already produced stereoscopic images, it was [here] that the full potential of the medium became clear, as the lenticular stereoscopes manufactured in Paris by Dubosq and Soleil under the instructions of Brewster introduced a commercially viable way to promote stereoscopy, applauded by Queen Victoria herself.

Williams' first studio in Lambeth served both as business and home. Here, "Williams rapidly acquired a fine reputation as portraitist. One source describes how the vicinity of the studio was often 'blocked with a dozen carriages awaiting the visitors at Mr. Williams' studio.' His portraits were exquisitely crafted, and displayed a restrained elegance which became his hallmark."

Soon his success allowed him to open a studio separate from his home, in Regent Street in 1854. With over twenty photography studios nearby competition was keen—and included his former mentor and teacher, Claudet. "Williams, with his characteristic discretion and low-key approach, did not advertise his business or put up large signs to attract clientele. It seems, though, that the gentry beat a path to his door, and his stereoscopic portraits became highly popular."

While the mainstay of his business was his stereoscopic (3-D) portraits, he was coming into his own with an artistic vision of what photography could and would become. He became one of the first photographers on record to shoot still life and other artistic compositions. These images became popular to the point that they became "part of the birth of a new genre that was to become the stereoscopic boom of the 1850s." The Victorians loved them; sales boomed.

In the mid-1850s, Williams contracted with the London Stereoscopic Company to publish his images. The LSC published the work of many eminent stereo photographers, including William England, and was able to mass-produce his works, which helped meet growing demand for his prints. The LSC published three stereoscopic series by Williams.

His first series was made up of portraits, artistic compositions and still life, many taken in his studio. May and Vidal write: The still life studies, with their fine detail and careful composition, showed a clear influence from the 17th century Dutch painting tradition, and a profound knowledge of the iconography surrounding this genre.

Photographs such as ‘The Old Larder,’ ‘Mortality’ and ‘Hawk and Duckling’ show stereography. Another group of images in this series, entitled “The Launching of the Marlborough”, taken on 31 July 1855, was highly praised in the Victorian press, since they embodied the achievement of ‘instantaneous’ photography, executed as they were from a moving boat, and managing to ‘freeze’ the waves on the surface of the sea.”

The second series was "The Crystal Palace," this time at Sydenham, as the original Palace in Hyde Park had been dismantled. "The quality of Williams' original daguerreotypes from this event are such that, though they contain images of hundreds of people, individual facial features of Queen Victoria and her party are clearly discernible."

== Scenes in Our Village ==
Williams' third and perhaps best-known series, "Scenes in Our Village," has recently been brought back into modern light by Dr. Brian May and Elena Vidal as the subject of their book, A Village Lost and Found.

This was a series of fifty-nine hand-coloured albumen prints on cards similar in shape and size to a modern postcard, containing images of village life ranging from idyllic scenes of trees and brooks to scenes of gossip or marriage proposals, children posing for portraits or sleeping, cottages, bridges, granaries and other buildings. The pairs of photographs on the card may be viewed with a stereoscope to produce a vivid and clear three-dimensional image. While viewing Williams' work, it seems one could walk right into the picture and turn the corner around the lane. On the back of most of the cards is a short descriptive verse, which is generally attributed to Williams, such as this one:

"Taking Corn Into the Granary."

From storm and rain

The garnered grain

Is housed, and come what may,

In his granary stored,

The farmer's hoard,

Lies snug till market day.

"For many years, it was thought that the village nostalgically portrayed in these photographs was a fictional creation. However, recent research revealed that all the images were taken at Hinton Waldrist, in Berkshire (now in Oxfordshire) and its surroundings."

Dr. May advertised a photograph of the village church on his website, asking whether anyone knew where it was, and within 36 hours had received 6 correct answers.

The discovery that it was, in fact, a real village, and the people portrayed were not actors, but real villagers Williams must have known personally, adds layers of meaning and insight into the series. It "was clearly a very personal undertaking for Williams; the tone of the poems shows an unmistakable familiarity with the subject and deep involvement with some of the described situations."

Another curious and interesting feature of the series is that Williams frequently appears in cameo in his own photographs, in a top hat and tails, facing away from the camera.

However, despite his popularity and fame—or perhaps because of it—Williams ceased production of these types of images after this series, stating they had become “vulgarized by imitation.”

== Royal photographer ==
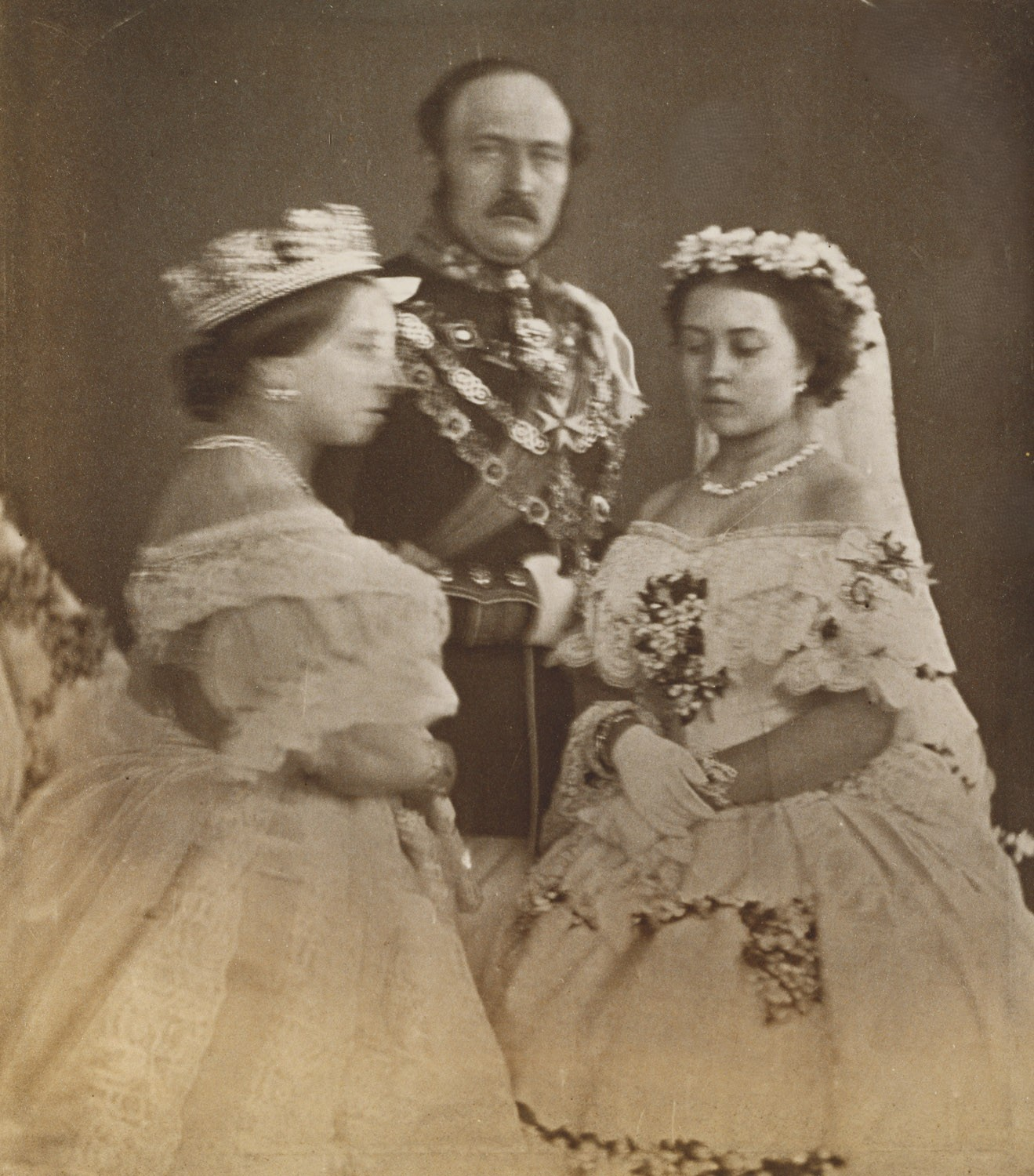
Queen Victoria, the Prince Consort and Victoria, Princess Royal in the dress they wore at the marriage of Princess Royal.

In 1856, Williams’ fame had grown to the point he was commissioned to photograph Princess Victoria on her sixteenth birthday, the first of a number of Royal portraits over the course of his career.

“Represented in the Royal Collection at Windsor Castle, [others] included the confirmation of Princess Alice (April 21, 1859), studies of Princesses Louise and Helena, and of Princess Victoria with her first son, Prince William."

After his series with the London Stereoscopic Company, he moved on to other works such as cartes de visite, stating on the reverse his status as "Photographer to the Queen."

== Critical acclaim ==
Williams was a lifetime member of the Photographic Society from its inception, and also belonged to the North London Photographic Society, and South London Photographic Society.

He also received medals at the Paris Exposition of 1855, the London International Exhibition of 1862, and from the Photographic Society of London in 1866.

He produced a remarkably high volume of work, yet "it was said that no print ever left his establishment without his personal inspection and approval." His success allowed him to move his family to Sellers Hall, a large mansion in Barnet.

== Illness and death ==
In the late 1860s, his health declined rapidly. He took on a partner to help ensure his business would continue, but did not escape the fatal effects: he died at home on 5 April 1871. His death certificate lists diabetes as the cause, but researchers May and Vidal theorise that the many chemicals used in early photographic processes may have contributed to the onset of his illness and early death, one month shy of his 47th birthday.

== Legacy and collectibility ==
May and Vidal write, "Through his work, Williams is now widely recognised as pivotal in the history of stereoscopic photography, since his stereo cards were the first examples of photographic art for its own sake ever to achieve wide commercial success."

There are a number of TR Williams collectors throughout the world, and no one person (at the time of this writing) yet owns a complete collection of his known prints.

== Gallery ==
Still-lifes, 1845-1850s
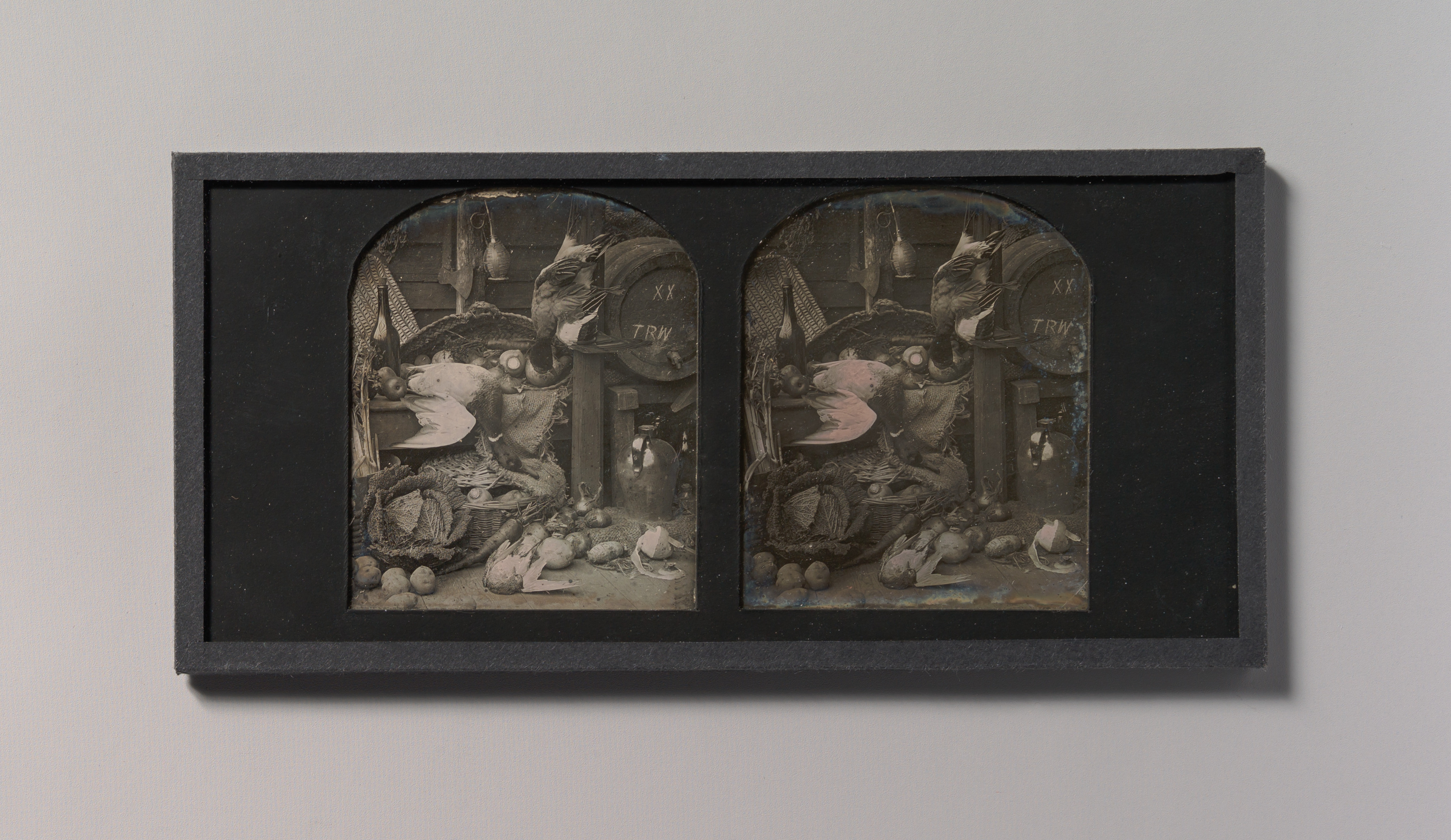
Still-life of Fowl with Initialed Barrel and Root Vegetables

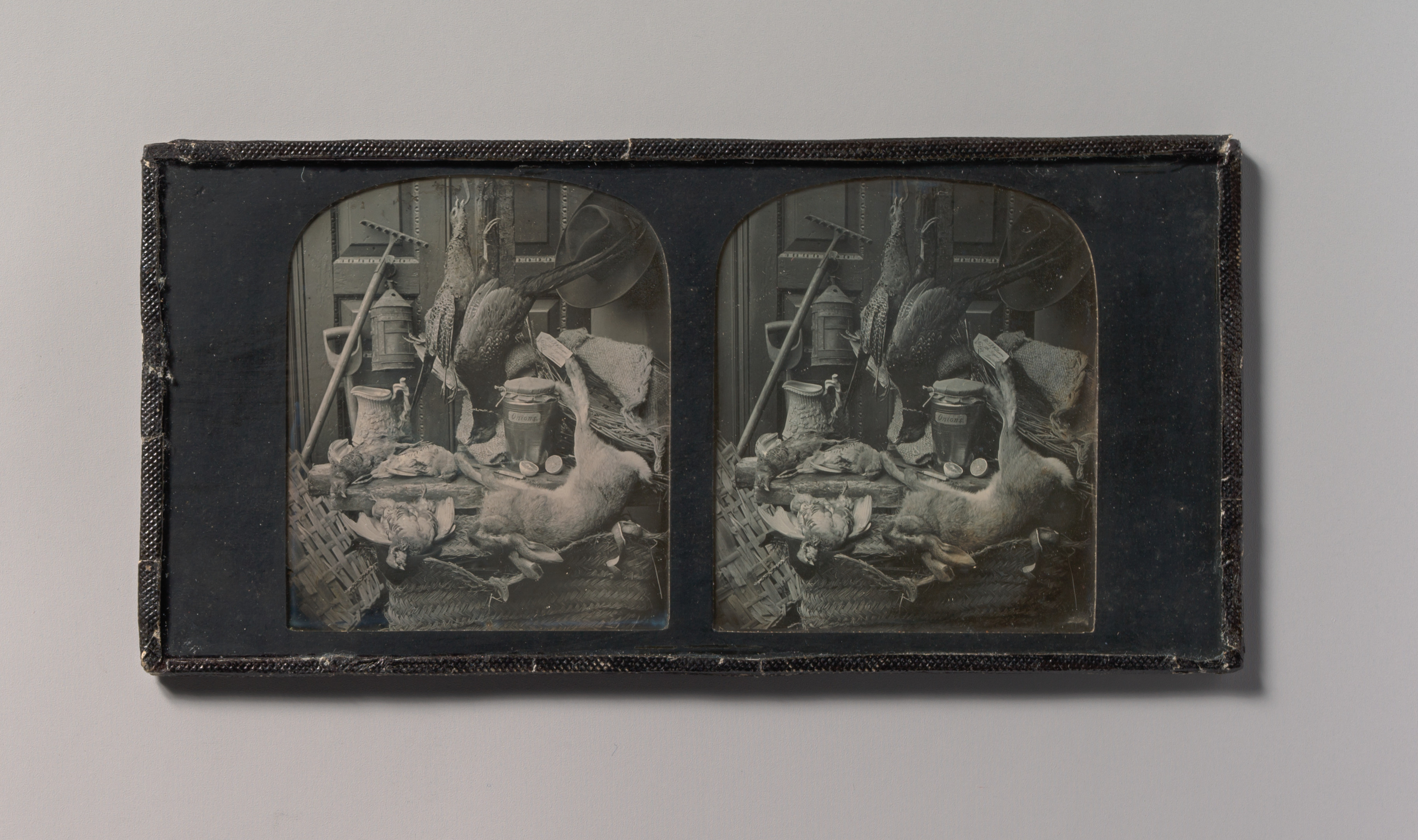
Still-life of Game with Rake and Onion Jar

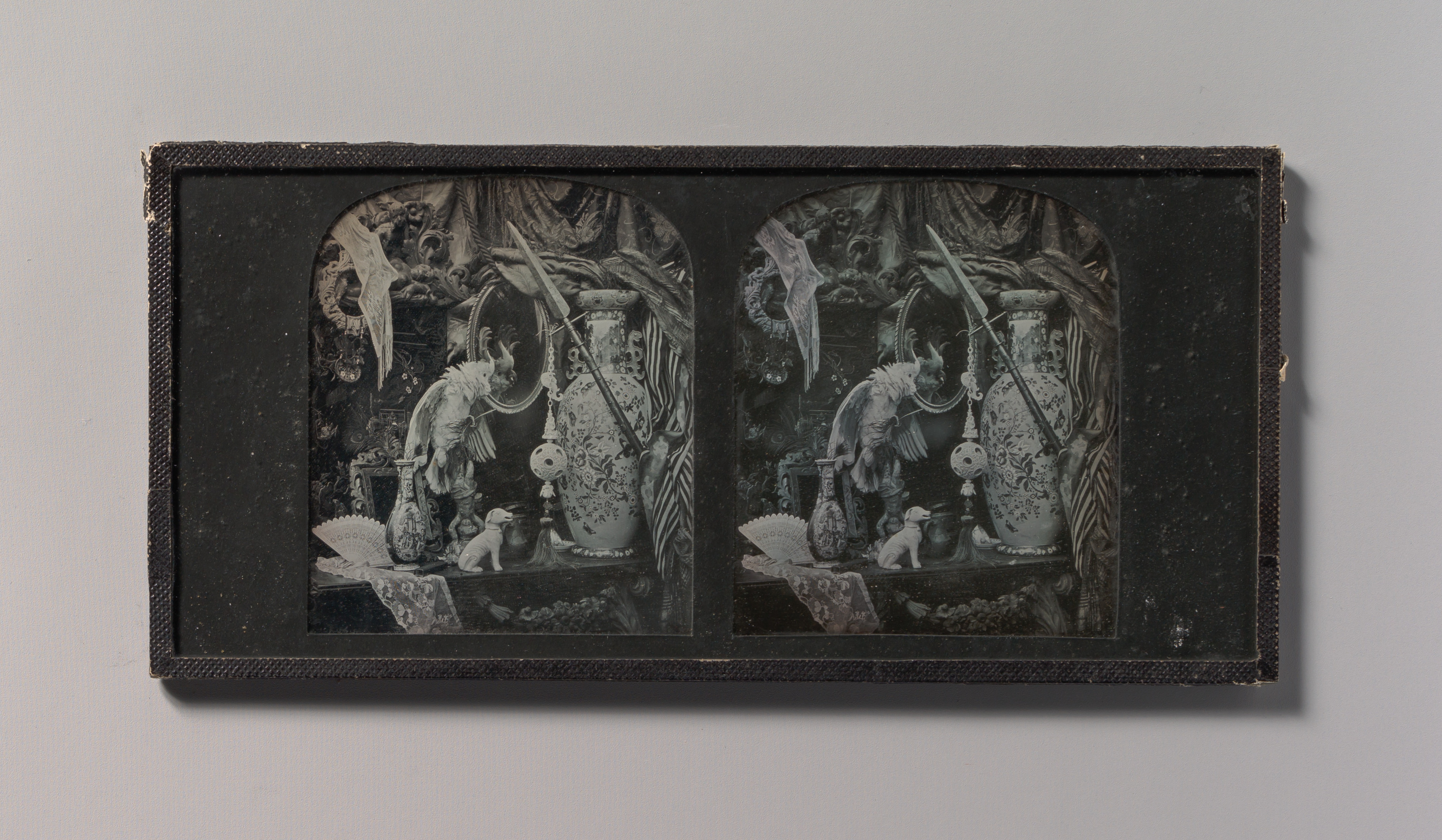
Still-life with Cockatoo, Mirror, Ornamental Ball, Vases, and Lace

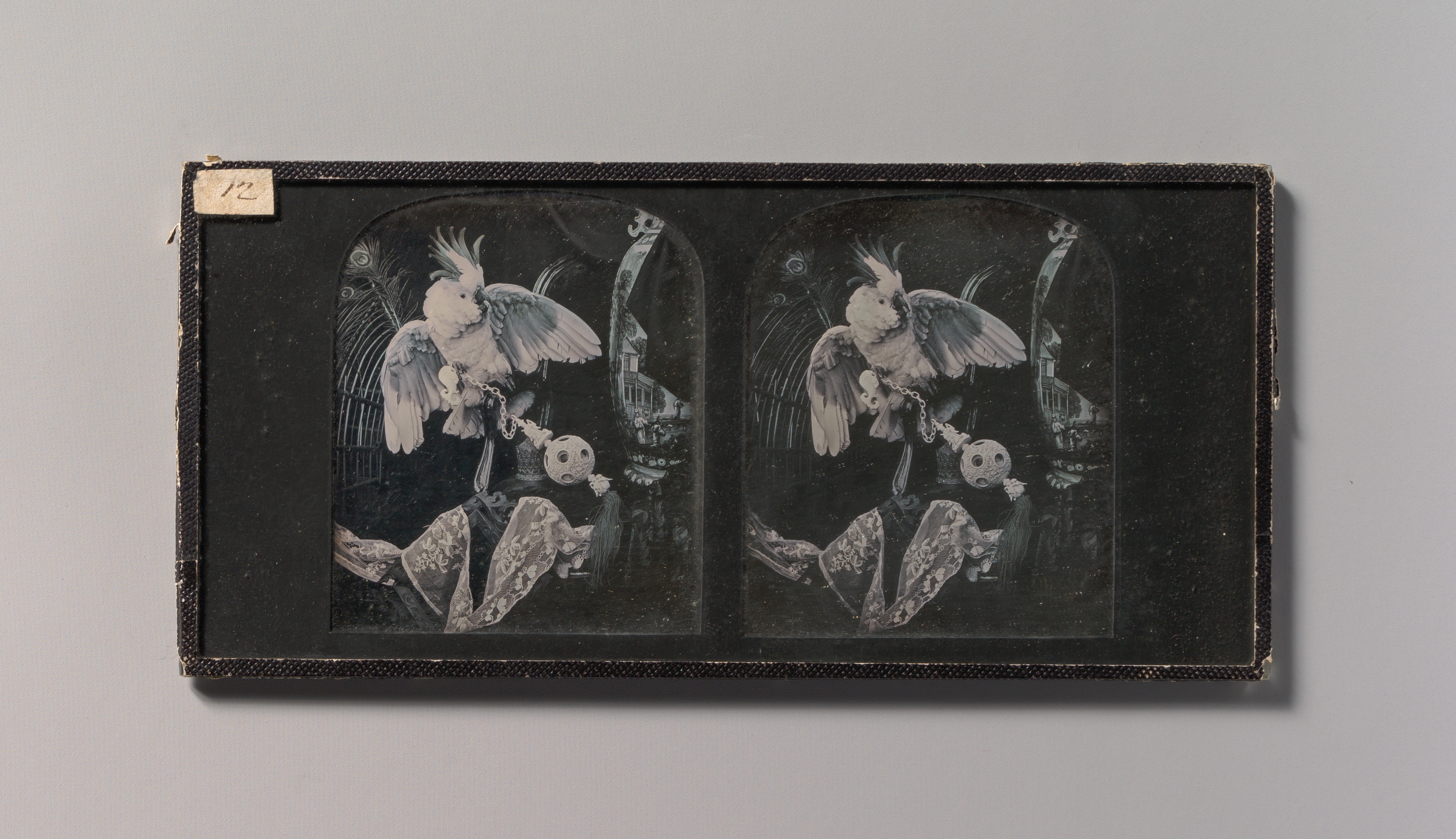
Still-life with Cockatoo, Ornamental Ball, Lace, Peacock Feathers

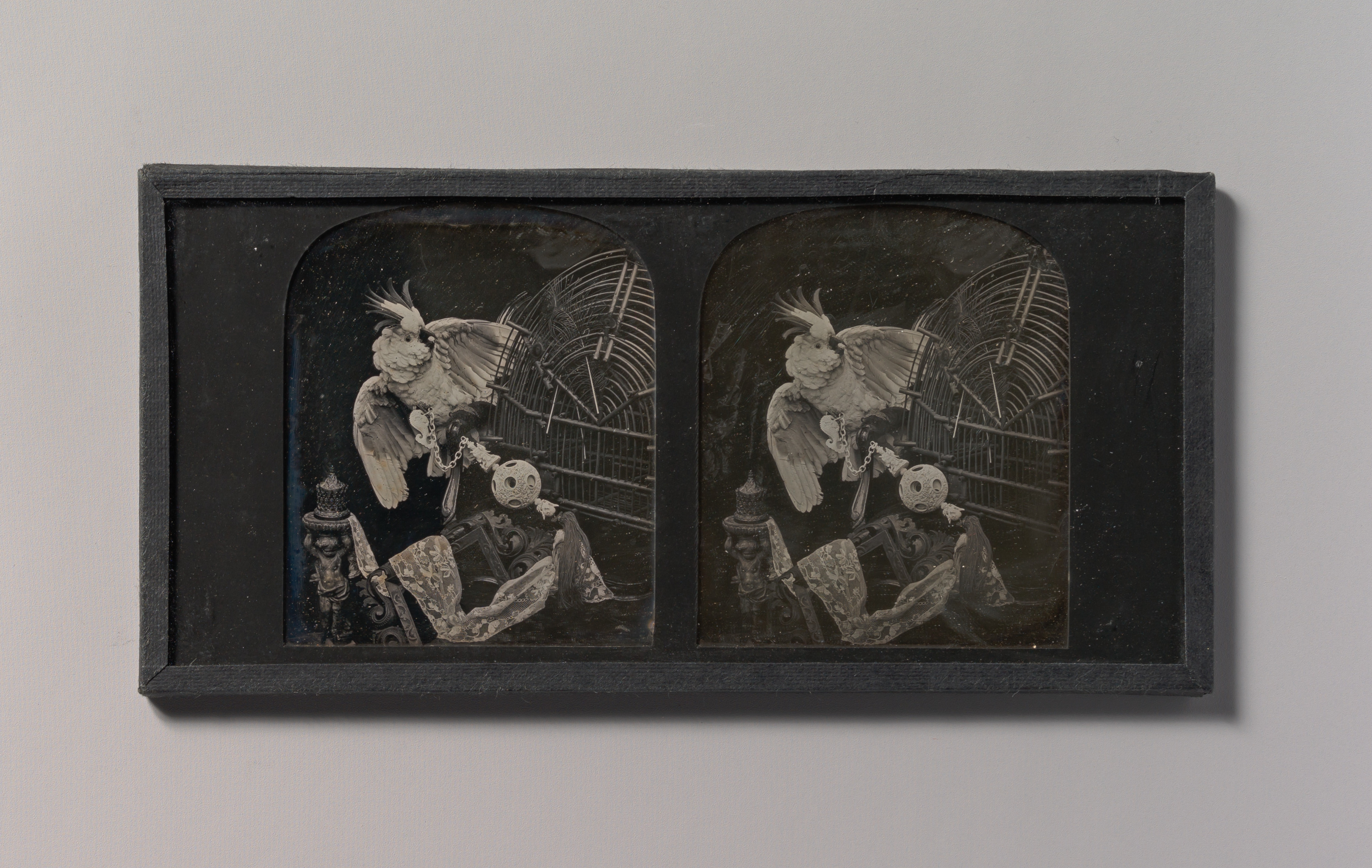
Still-life with Cockatoo, Ornamental Ball, Lace, Statuette

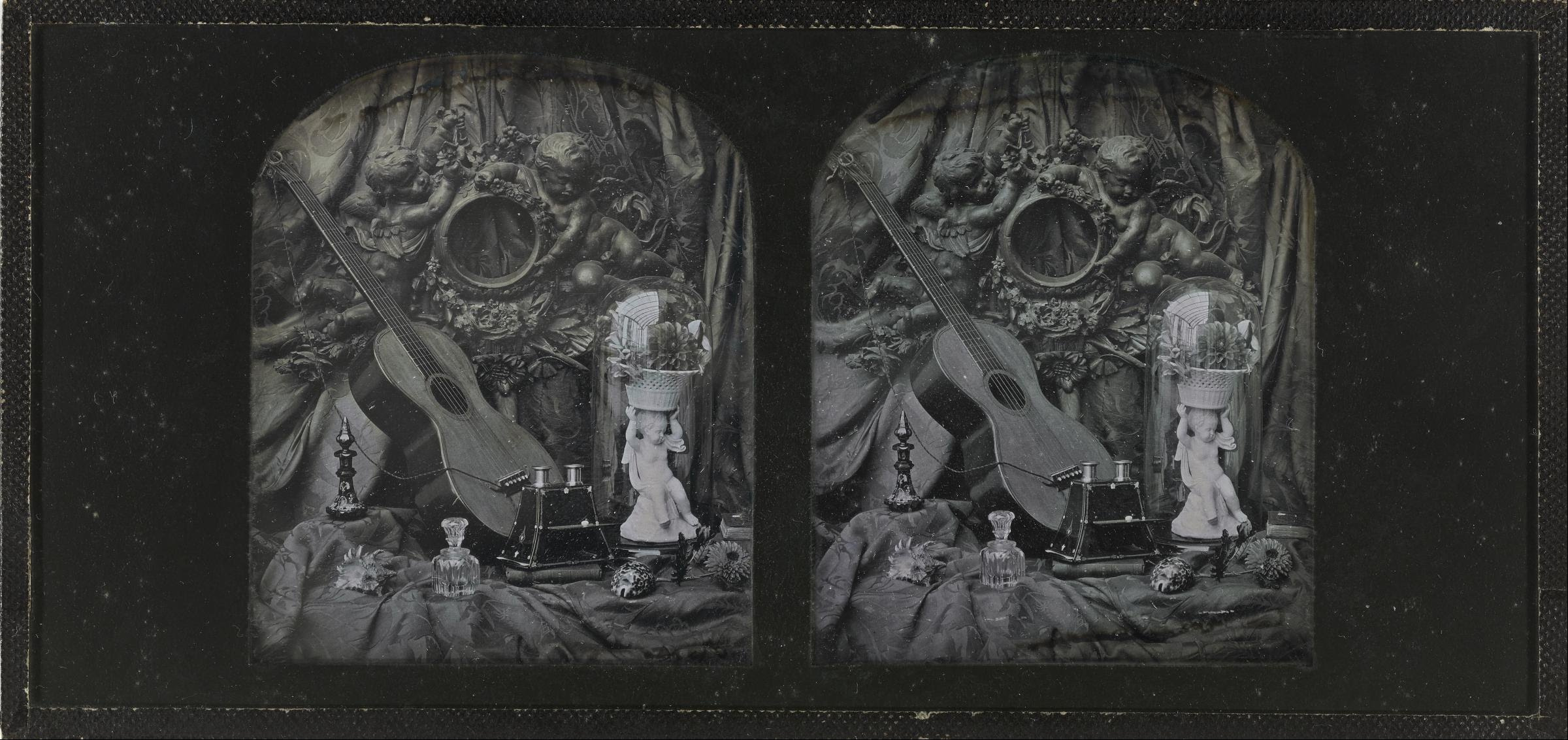
Still Life with Guitar and Stereo Viewer

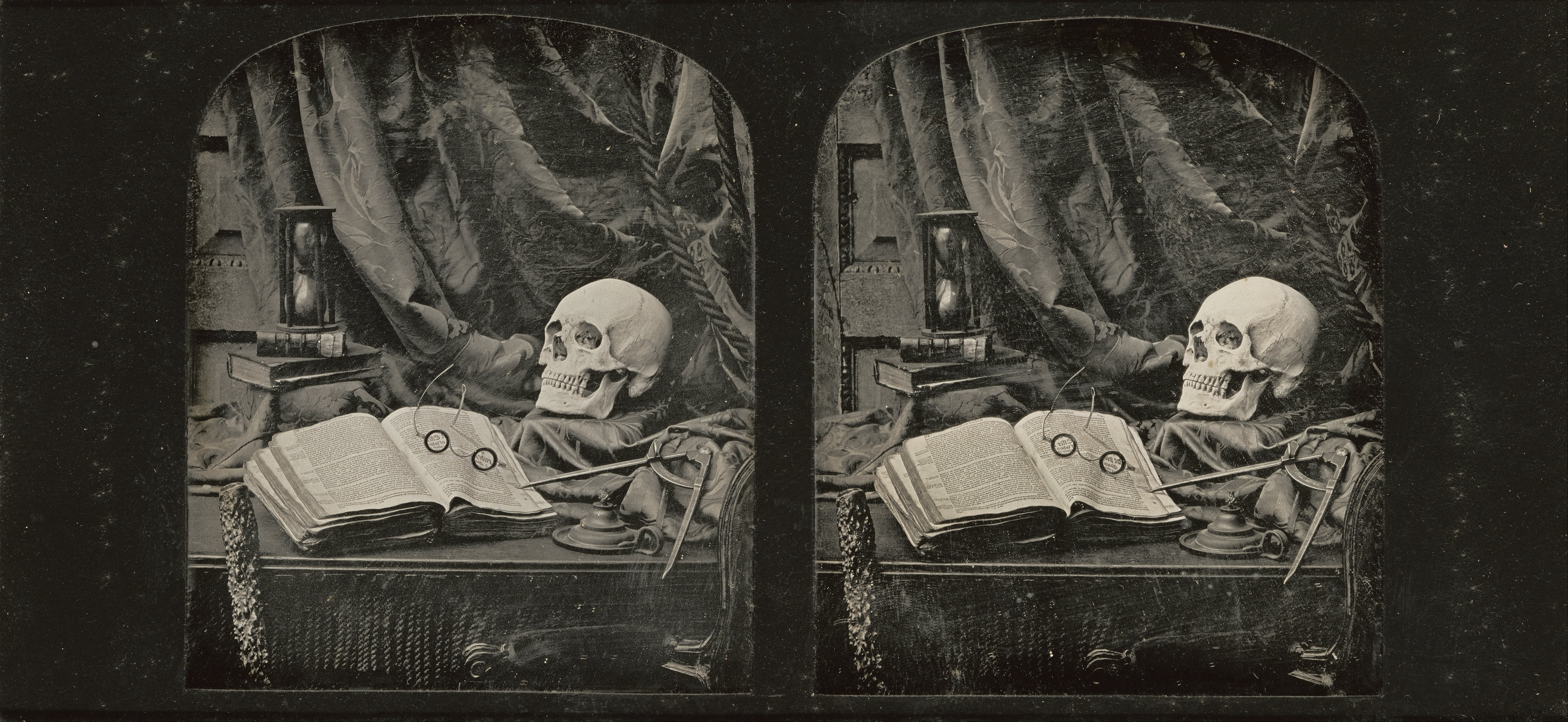
The Sands of Time

== Sources ==
- "Obituary", Photographic News, 21 April 1871, p. 183.
- The Times, 8 May 1854.
- Notes and Queries, No.242, 17 June 1854, p. 571.
- The Illustrated London News, 11 August 1855, p. 167–168.
- Brian May, "New Light on T. R.Williams", Stereo World, Vol.30, No.1, 2004. p. 22–27.
- Brian May and Elena Vidal, "T. R.Williams' 'Scenes in Our Village'", Stereo World, Vol.31, No.4, 2006. p. 14–21, 29.
- Brian May and Elena Vidal, A Village Lost and Found: 'Scenes in Our Village' by T. R. Williams – an Annotated Tour of the Celebrated 1850s Stereo Card Series, Frances Lincoln, London 2009. ISBN 978-0-7112-3039-2
- The Athenaeum, No.1521, 20 December 1856.
- The Times, 27 January 1858.
- Photographic Journal, 15 February 1861, p. 98.
- Margaret Harker, Henry Peach Robinson: Master of Photographic Art (1830–1901), Basil Blackwell Ltd., Oxford 1988.
- British Journal of Photography, 1 August 1862.
- Roger Taylor, Photographs Exhibited in Britain 1839–1865, National Gallery of Canada Library and Archives, 2002.
- The Photographic News, 5 March 1880.
- The London Gazette, 18 July 1876.
- Oxford Dictionary of National Biography (includes photo)
