= 1862 International Exhibition =

World's Fair held in London

International Exhibition
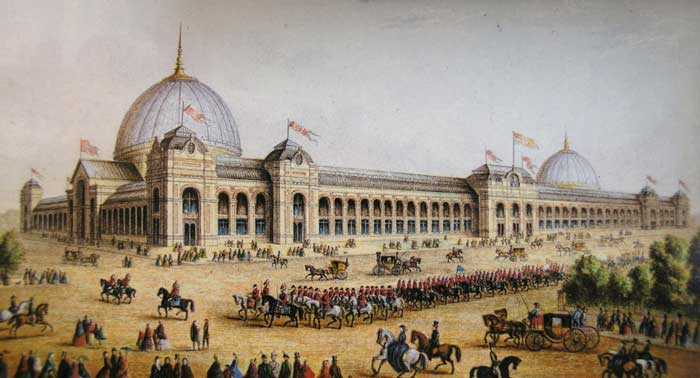
- 1862 International Exhibition, South Kensington

Overview
- BIE-class: Universal exposition
- Category: Historical Expo
- Name: International Exhibition
- Area: 11 ha (27 acres)
- Invention(s): Analytical engine
- Visitors: 6,096,617

Participant(s)
- Countries: 39

Location
- Country: United Kingdom
- City: London
- Venue: Kensington Exhibition Road
- Coordinates: 51°30′1.4″N 0°10′33.2″W

Timeline
- Opening: May 1 – November 15, 1862 (6 months and 2 weeks)
- Closure: 15 November 1862; 163 years ago

Universal expositions
- Previous: Exposition Universelle (1855) in Paris
- Next: Exposition Universelle (1867) in Paris

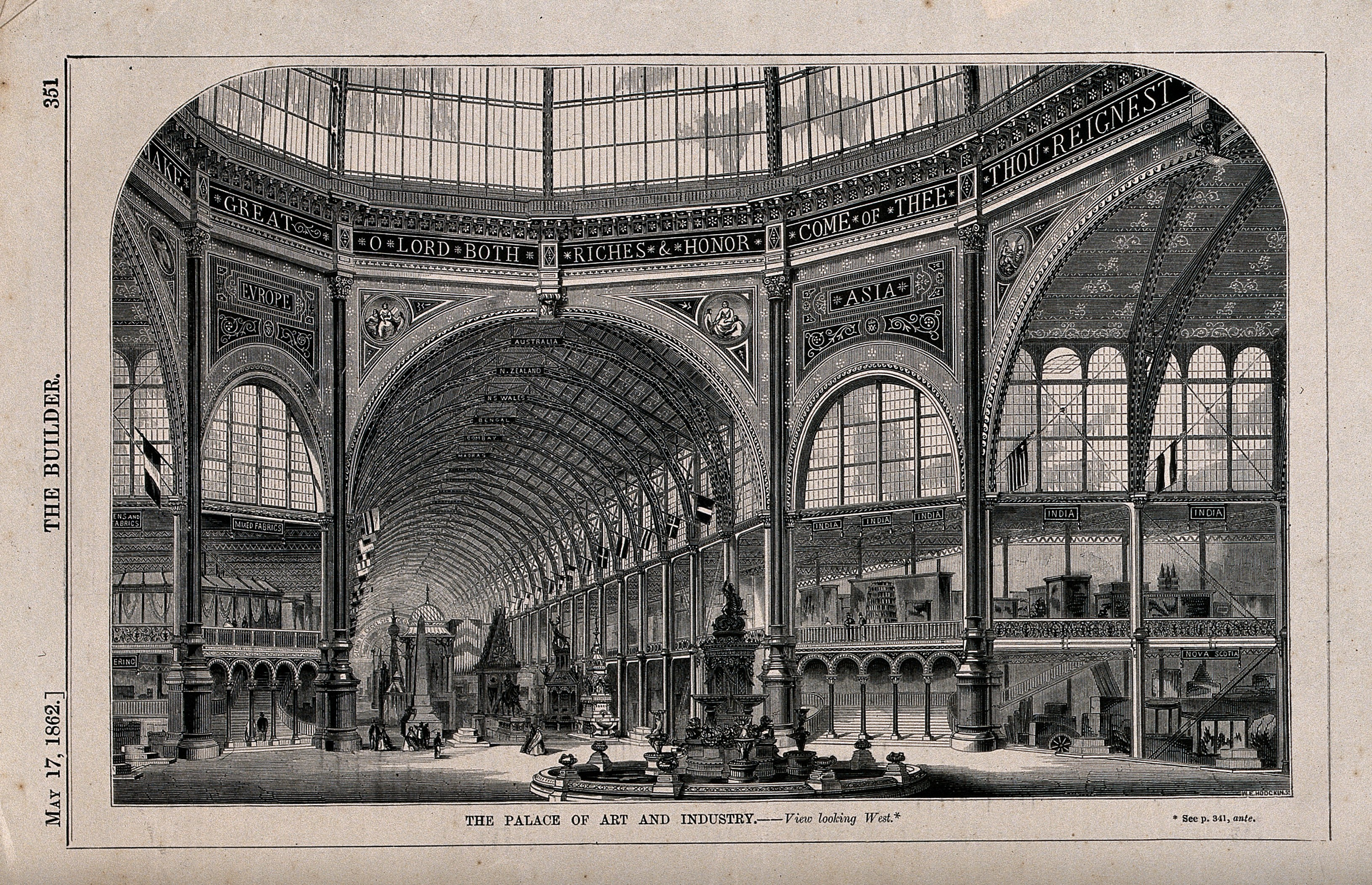
Interior view of the Palace of Art and Industry from beneath the eastern dome

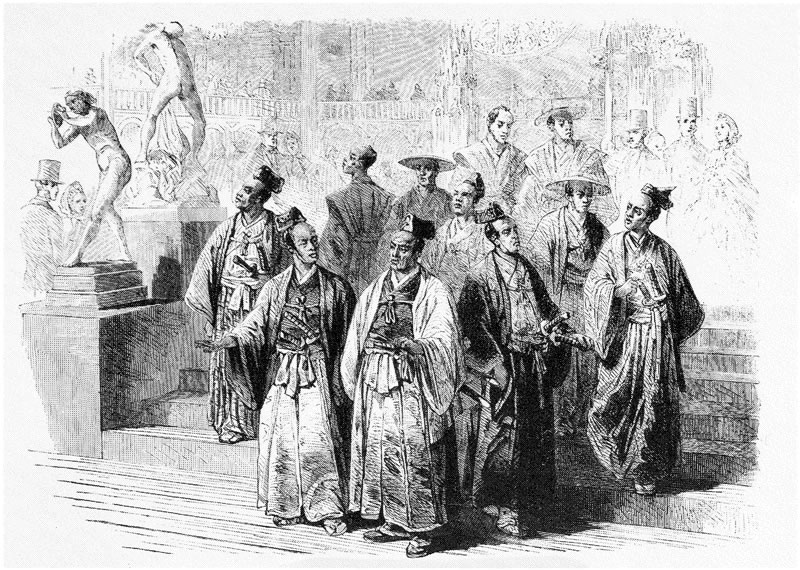
The members of the First Japanese Embassy to Europe (1862) visiting the expo

The International Exhibition of 1862, officially the London International Exhibition of Industry and Art, also known as the Great London Exposition, was a world's fair held from 1 May to 1 November 1862 in South Kensington, London, England. The site now houses museums including the Natural History Museum and the Science Museum.

== Background and overview ==
After the Great Exhibition, held in 1851, had proven to be a huge success, the British Government planned another international exhibition that would surpass both this one and the 1855 Paris Exposition, larger in both size and scale. The intention was to showcase the advances which had since been made in industry, technology, and arts. It was intended to be held in 1861, but was delayed owing to various international events, including the Italian War of Independence and American Civil War (which caused a shortage of cotton, among other things).

The exposition, officially named the London International Exhibition of Industry and Art, was sponsored by the Royal Society of Arts, Manufactures and Trade, and featured over 28,000 exhibitors from 36 countries, representing a wide range of industry, technology, and the arts. William Sterndale Bennett composed music for the opening ceremony.

The opening took place on 1 May 1862. Queen Victoria, still in mourning for her consort Prince Albert, did not attend; instead her cousin the Duke of Cambridge presided from a throne sited beneath the western dome. An opening address was delivered by the Earl Granville, chairman of Her Majesty's Commissioners, the group responsible for the organisation of the event.

There were 39 participating countries, and a total of 6,096,617 visitors attended the exhibition. Receipts (£459,632) were slightly above cost (£458,842), leaving a total profit of £790. An official closing ceremony took place on 1 November 1862, but the exhibition remained open to the public until 15 November 1862.

== Buildings ==
The exhibition was held in South Kensington, London, on a site covering 11 ha (27 acres), and now occupied by the Natural History Museum. The buildings, which occupied 21 acres (8.5 ha), were designed by Captain Francis Fowke of the Royal Engineers, and built by Lucas Brothers and Sir John Kelk. They took only 11 months to build. They were intended to be permanent, and were constructed in an un-ornamented style with the intention of adding decoration in later years as funds allowed. Much of the construction was of cast-iron, 12,000 tons worth, though façades were brick. Picture galleries occupied three sides of a rectangle on the south side of the site; the largest, with a frontage on the Cromwell Road, was 1,150 ft (350 m) long, 50 ft (15 m) high and 50 ft (15 m) wide, with a grand triple-arched entrance.

Fowke paid particular attention to lighting pictures in a way that would eliminate glare. Behind the picture galleries were the "Industrial Buildings" . These were composed of "naves" and "transepts", lit by tall clerestories, with the spaces in the angles between them filled by glass-roofed courts. Above the brick entrances on the east and west fronts were two great glass domes, each 150 feet wide and 260 feet high - at that time the largest domes ever built. The timber-framed "Machinery Galleries", the only parts of the structure intended to be temporary, stretched further north along Prince Consort Road.

Parliament declined the Government's wish to purchase the building and the materials were sold and used for the construction of Alexandra Palace.

== Exhibitions ==
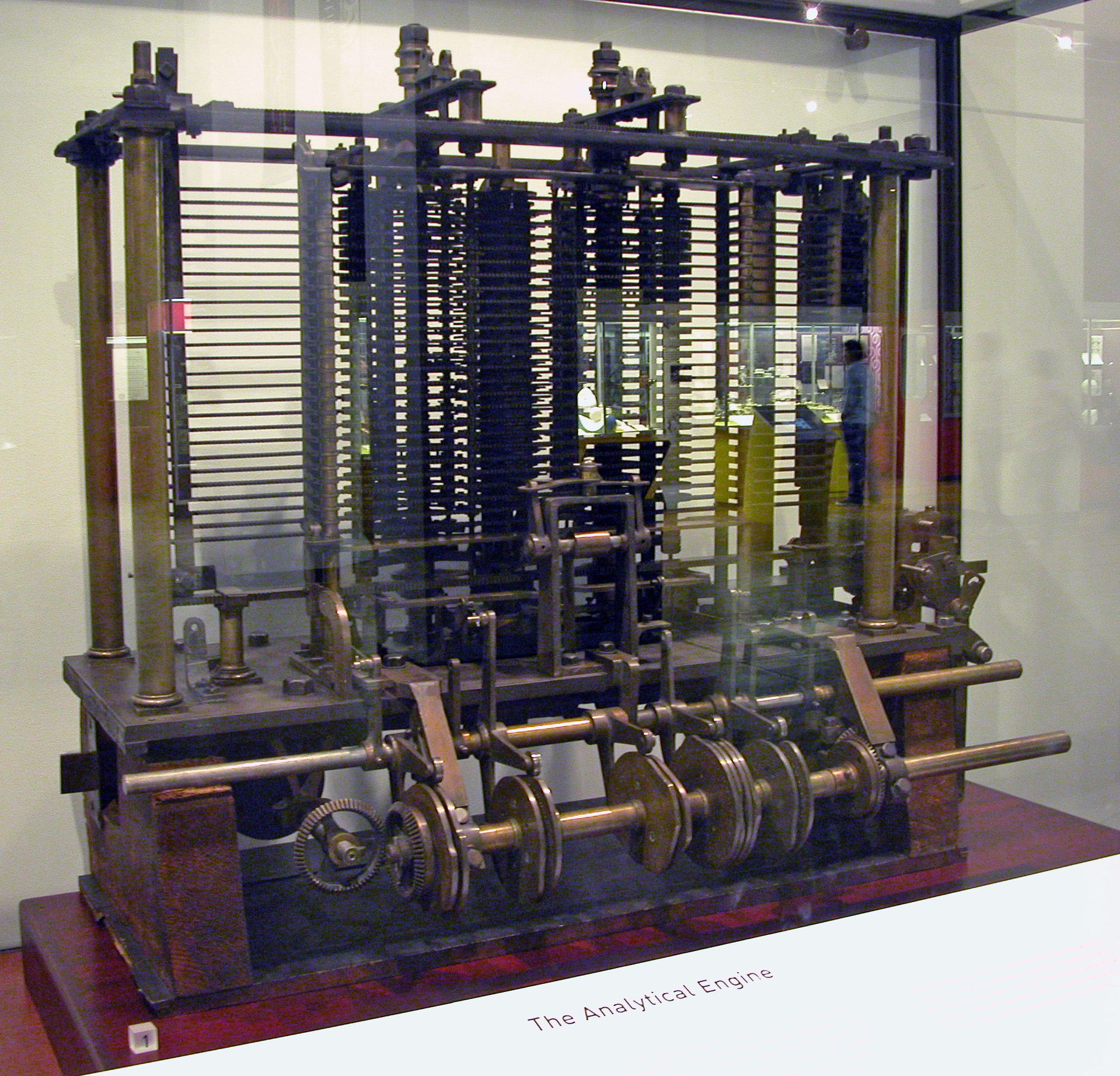
Babbage's Analytical Engine

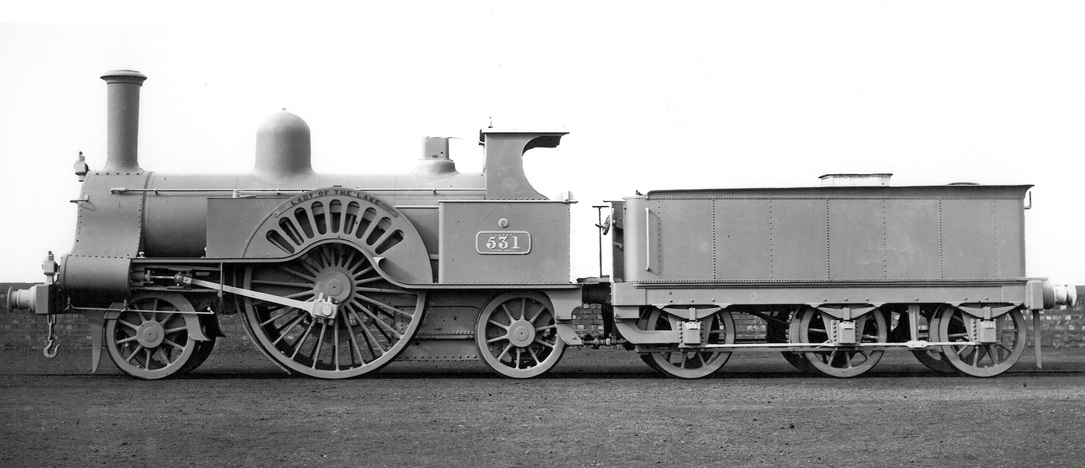
London and North Western Railway Lady of the Lake class locomotive No. 531 exhibited at the exhibition

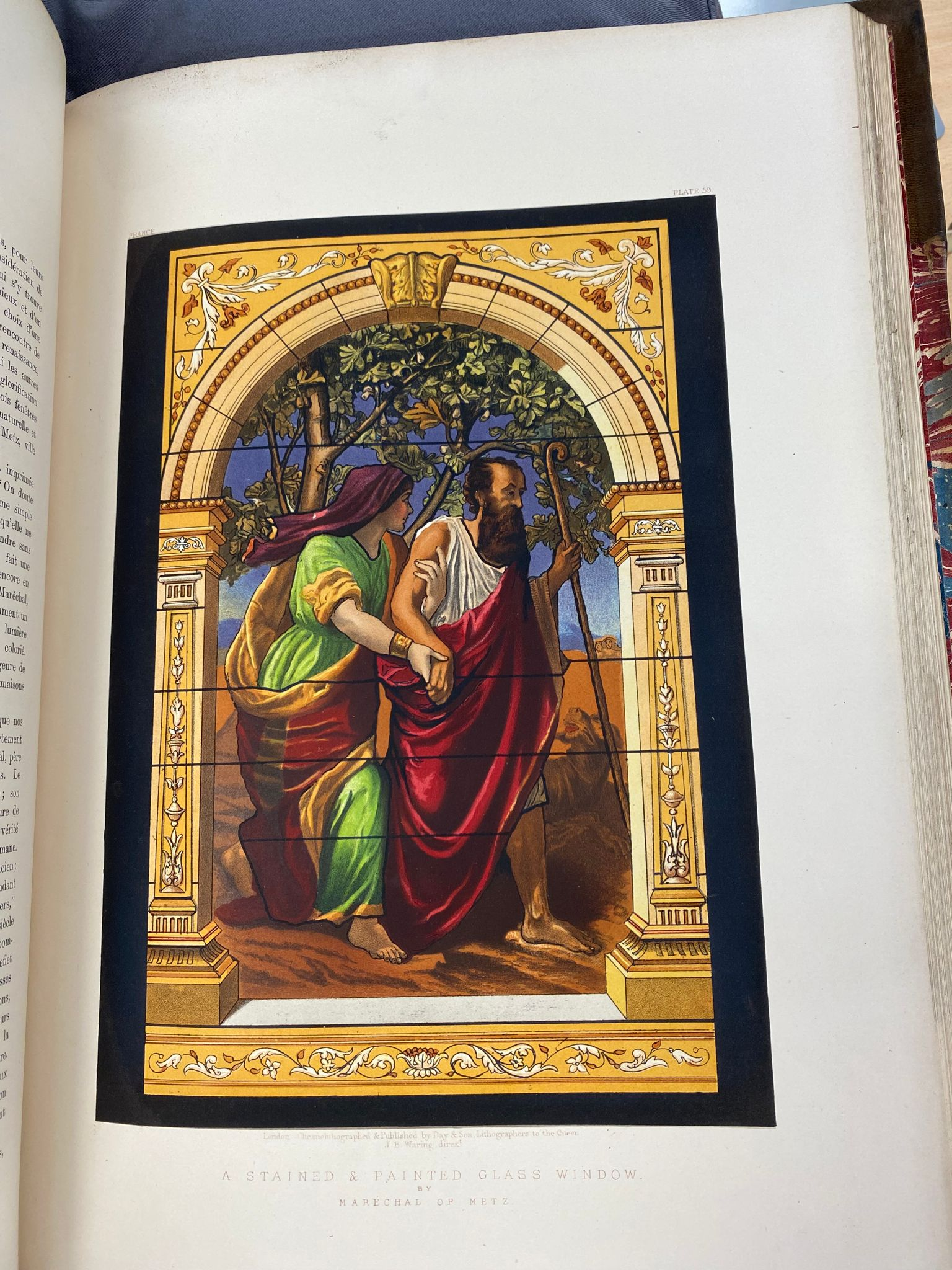
A stained glass window by Charles-Laurent Maréchal

The exhibition was a showcase of the advances made in the industrial revolution, especially in the decade since the Great Exhibition of 1851. Among the items on display were:

- the electric telegraph
- submarine cables
- the first plastic
- Parkesine
- machine tools
- looms
- precision instruments
- Charles Babbage's analytical engine
- cotton mills
- maritime engines (made by Henry Maudslay and Humphrys, Tennant and Dykes)
- stained-glass windows by French artist Charles-Laurent Maréchal

There was also a range of smaller goods including fabrics, rugs, sculptures, furniture, plates, porcelain, silver and glass wares, and wallpaper.

The manufacture of ice by an early refrigerator caused a sensation.

The work shown by William Morris's decorative arts firm of Morris, Marshall, Faulkner & Co. attracted much notice.

The exposition also introduced the use of caoutchouc for rubber production and the Bessemer process for steel manufacture.

Benjamin Simpson showed photos from the Indian subcontinent.

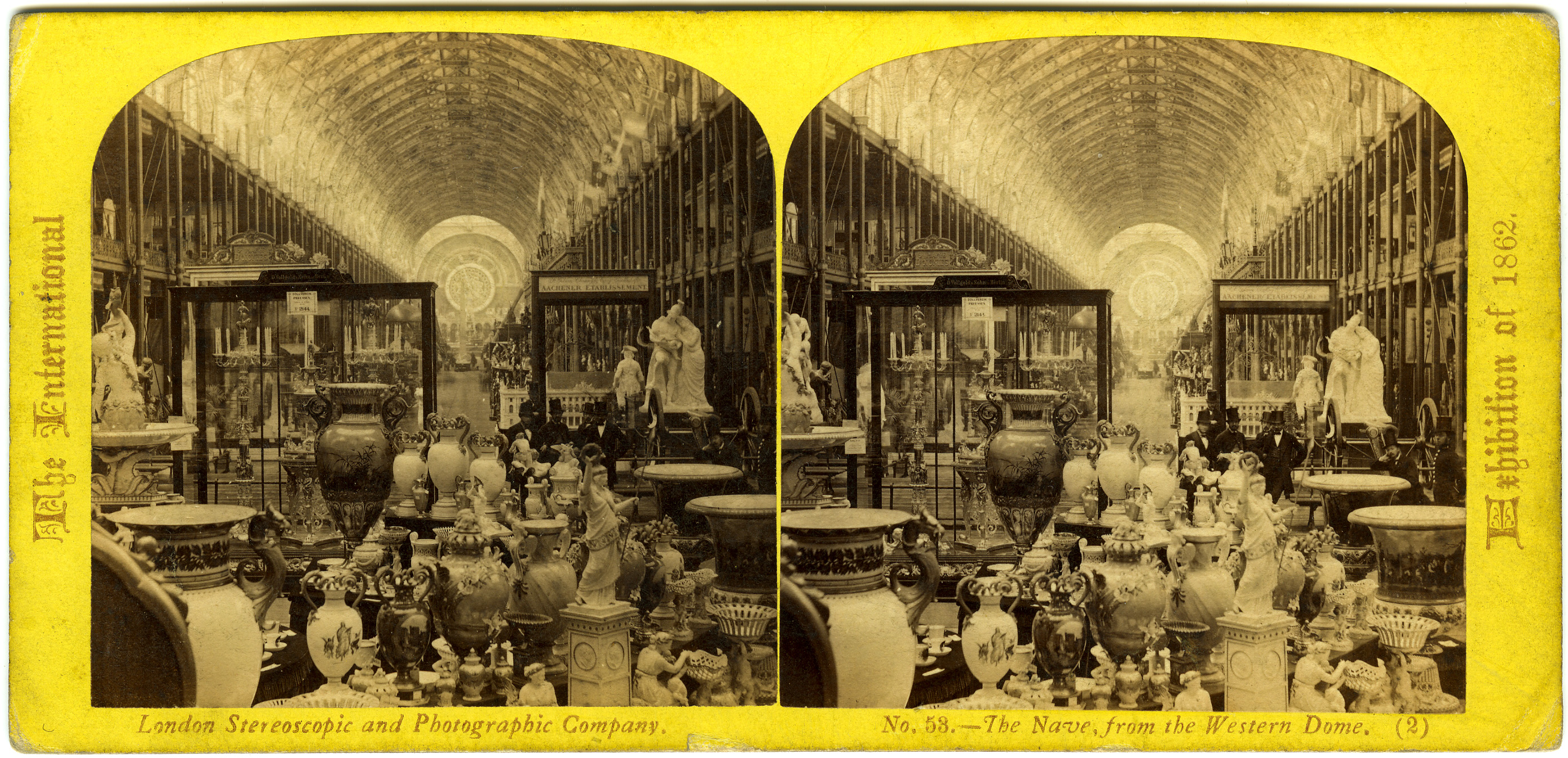
A stereoscopic view of the nave from the Western Dome, published by the London Stereoscopic Company

William England led a team of stereoscopic photographers, which included William Russell Sedgfield and Stephen Thompson, to produce a series of 350 stereo views of the exhibition for the London Stereoscopic Company. The images were made using the new collodion wet plate process which allowed exposure times of only a few seconds. These images provide a vivid three-dimensional record of the exhibition. They were on sale to the public in boxed sets and were delivered to the Queen by messenger so that she could experience the exhibition from her seclusion in mourning.

The London and North Western Railway exhibited one of their express passenger locomotives, No. 531 Lady of the Lake. A sister locomotive, No. 229 Watt had famously carried Trent Affair despatches earlier that year, but the Lady of the Lake (which won a bronze medal at the exhibition) was so popular that the entire class of locomotive became known as Ladies of the Lake. The manufacturing Lilleshall Company exhibited a 2-2-2 express passenger locomotive.

There was an extensive art gallery designed to allow an even light without reflection on the pictures.

The exhibition also included an international chess tournament, the London 1862 chess tournament.

A large tiger skin, from a tiger shot in 1860 by Colonel Charles Reid, was exhibited here. The skin was mounted by Edwin H. Ward and subsequently became "The Leeds Tiger", still on display at Leeds City Museum, UK.

== Music ==
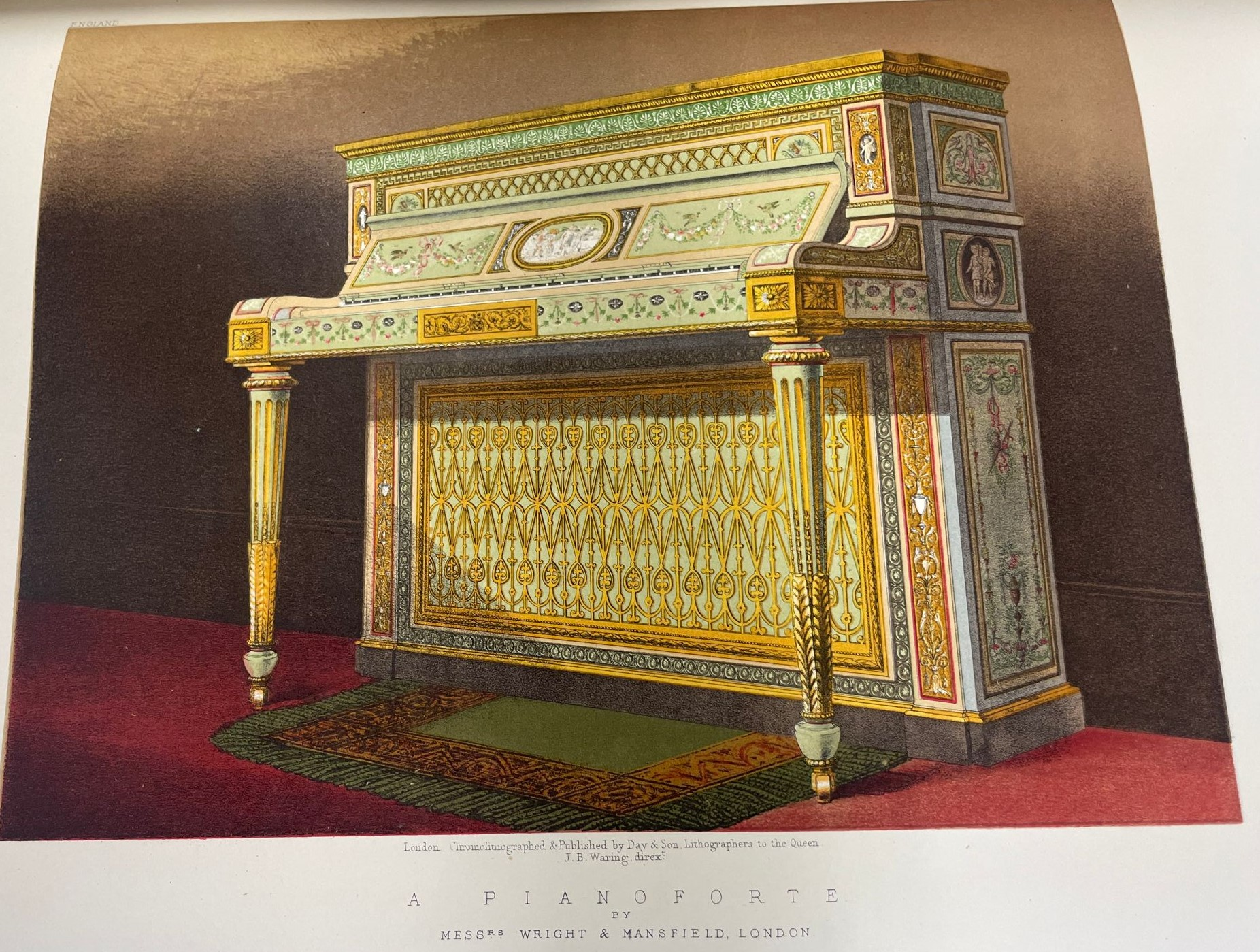
A Pianoforte, by Messrs. Wright & Mansfield

Unlike the Great Exhibition of 1851, the Society of Arts chose to have a distinctive musical component to the exhibition of 1862. Music critic Henry Chorley was selected as advisor, and recommended commissioning works by William Sterndale Bennett, Giacomo Meyerbeer, Daniel Auber, and Gioacchino Rossini. Being in his retirement, Rossini declined, so the Society asked Giuseppe Verdi, who eventually accepted.

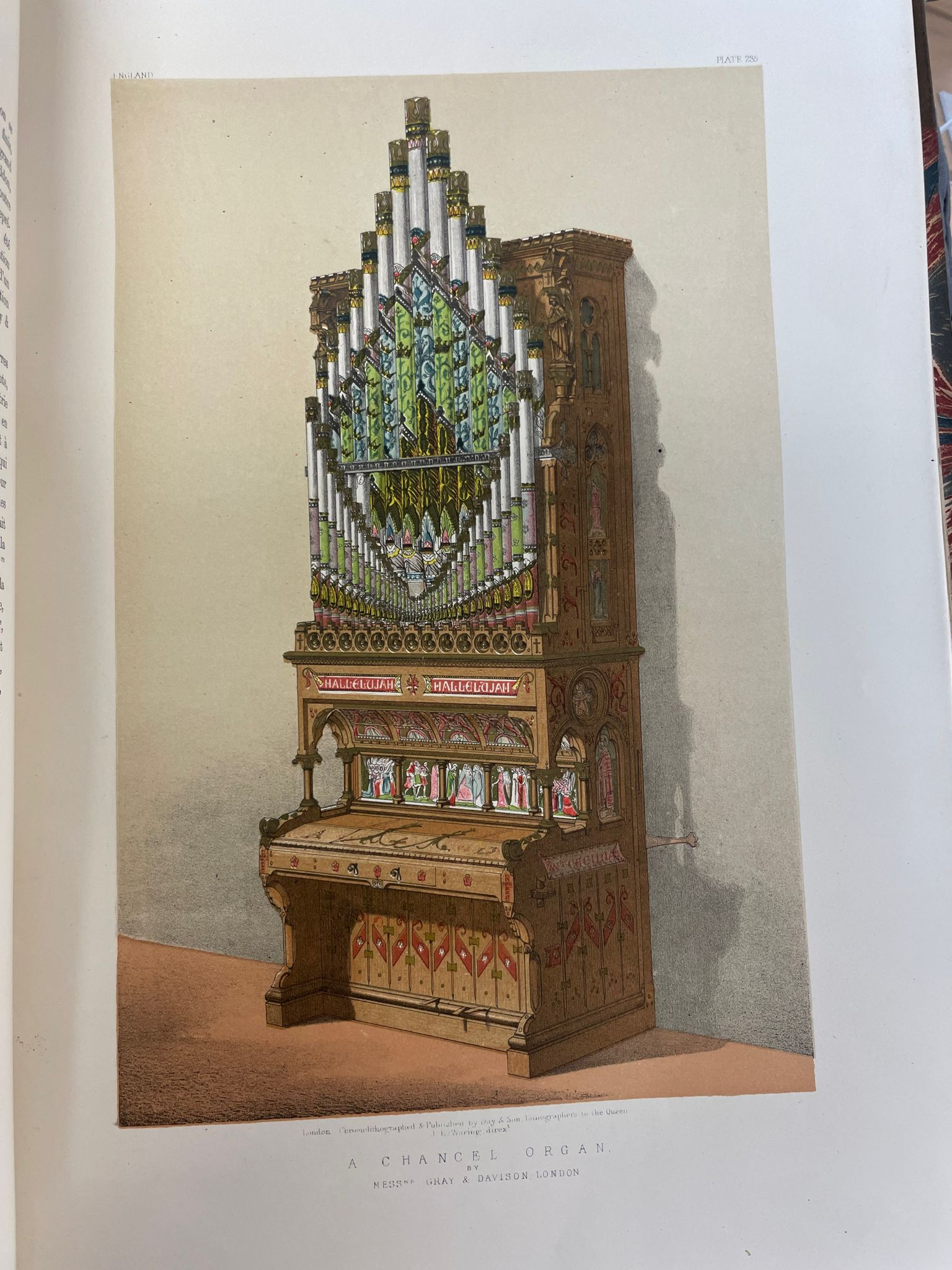
A Chancel Organ by Mess Gray & Davison, London

William Sterndale Bennett wrote his Ode Written Expressly for the Opening of the International Exhibition (upon a text by Alfred, Lord Tennyson), Meyerbeer wrote his Fest-Ouvertüre im Marschstil, and Auber wrote his Grand triumphal march. These three works premiered at the opening of the exhibition on 1 May 1862, with the orchestra led by conductor Prosper Sainton. Controversies involving Verdi's contribution, the cantata Inno delle nazioni, prevented the work from being included in the inaugural concert. It was first performed on 24 May 1862 at Her Majesty's Theatre in a concert organized by James Henry Mapleson.

At another concert, the French pianist and composer Georges Pfeiffer created his Second Piano Concerto.

The pianist Ernst Pauer performed daily piano recitals on the stage under the western dome.

== Accident ==
At the opening of the exhibition on 1 May 1862, one of the attending Members of the British Parliament, 70-year-old Robert Aglionby Slaney, fell onto the ground through a gap between floorboards on a platform. He carried on with his visit despite an injured leg, but died from gangrene that set in on the 19th.

== Legacy ==
The exhibition buildings were dismantled and the materials used to construct Alexandra Palace.

The exhibition eclipsed the previous two exhibitions in size and scale, but did not attract as many visitors as aimed for (11 million).

Fowke posited the idea of a new museum of natural history to be built on the former site of the Exhibition Palace in 1864. The idea was taken up by the government, and in 1881 the Natural History Museum was inaugurated. The Science Museum and the Victoria and Albert Museum were also built on the exhibition site.

Entrepreneur Arthur Lasenby Liberty, was inspired by the exhibition which led him to open an oriental warehouse. He opened his first shop, East India House in 1875 at No. 218a Regent Street, selling silk garments and various oriental goods - the foundation the present Liberty's department store.

== Gallery ==
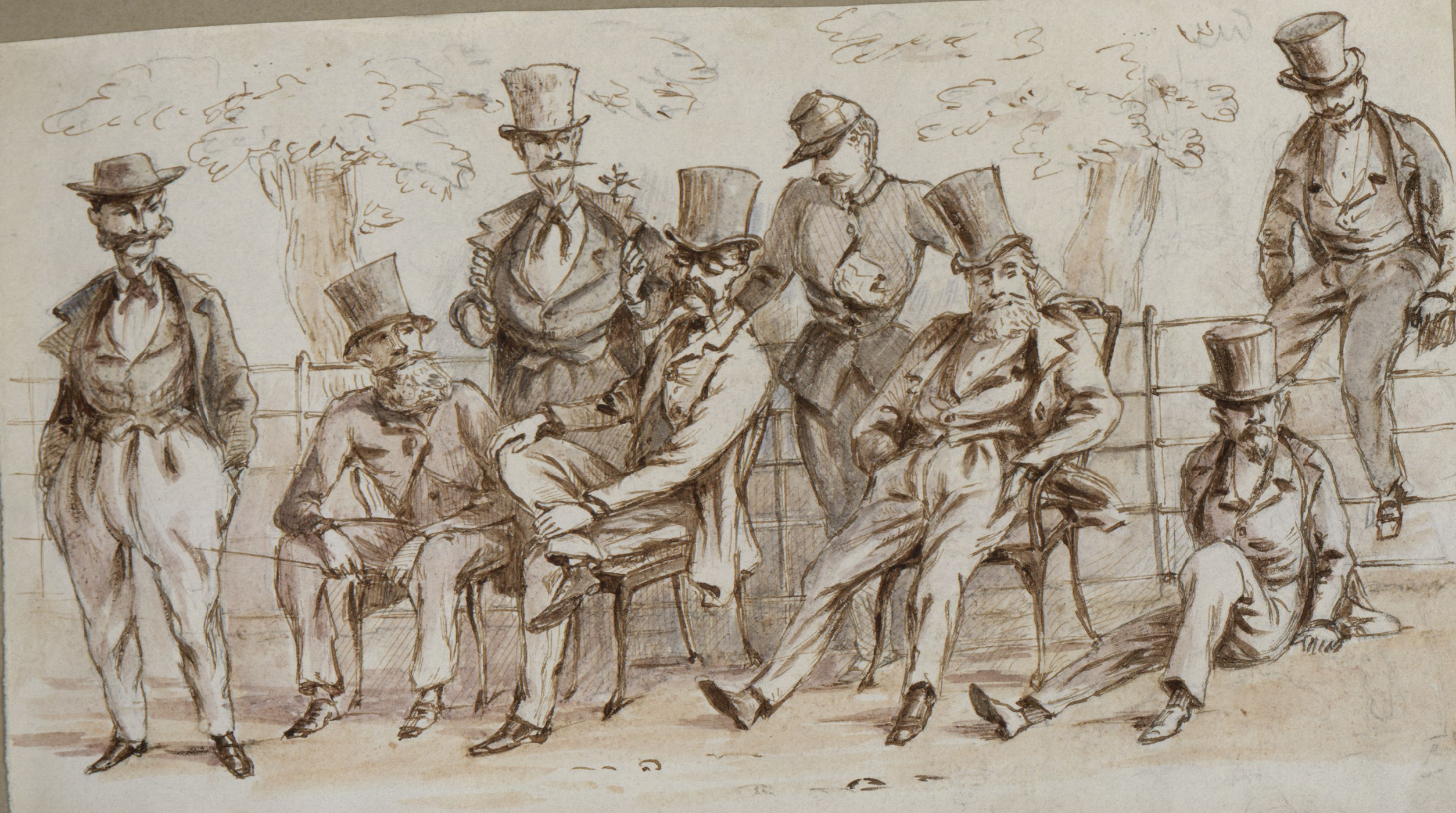
Foreigners over for the great exhibition. A satirical sketch by Frances Elizabeth Wynne

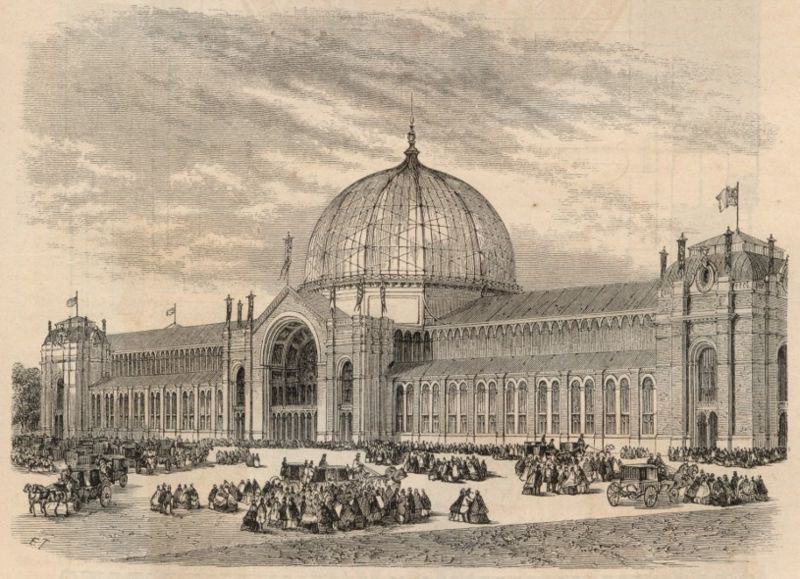
1862 international exhibition, western elevation view

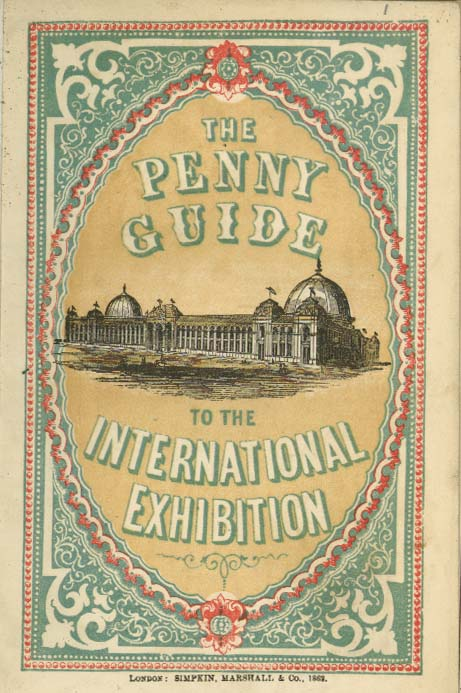
Penny Guide to the exhibition

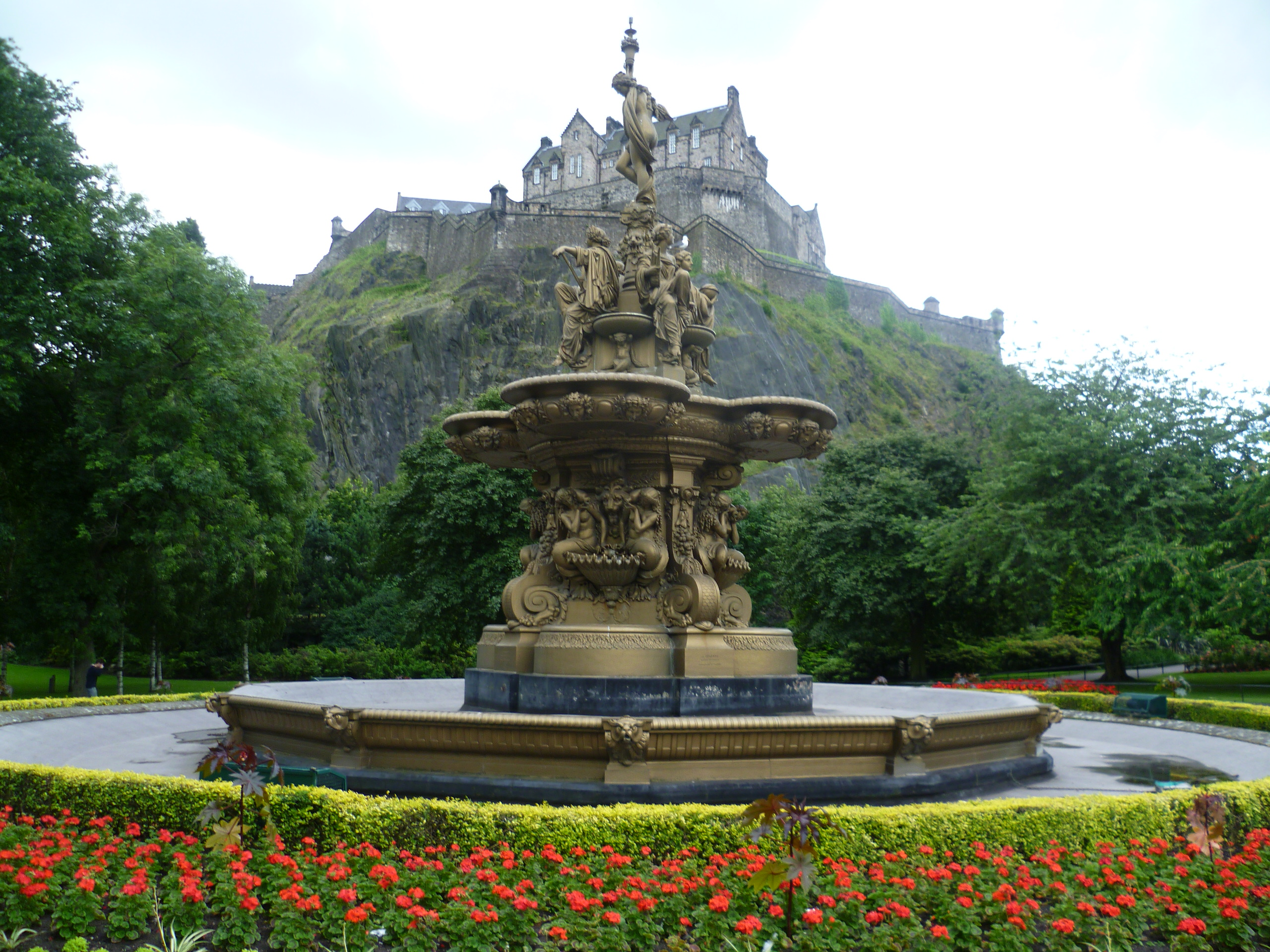
The Ross Fountain in Edinburgh, manufactured in Paris, an exhibit at the expo

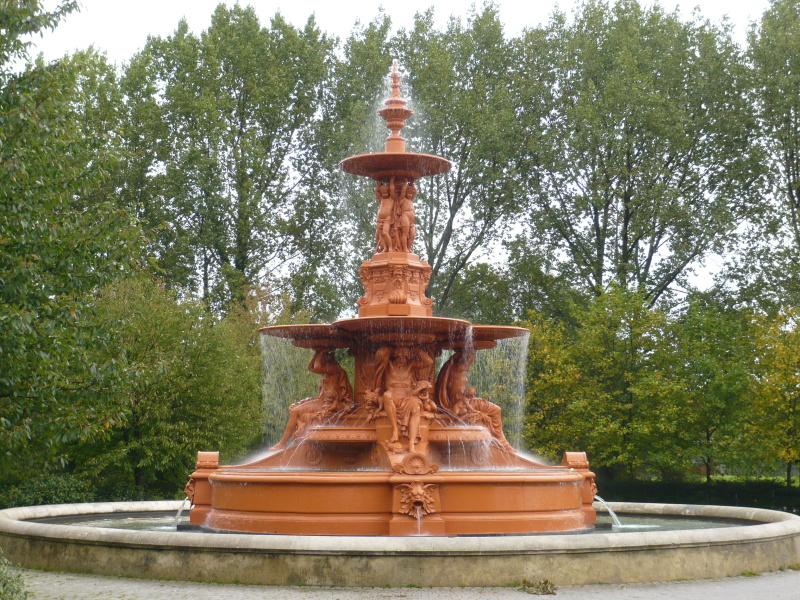
Hubert Fountain in Victoria Park, Ashford, Kent, an exhibit at the expo

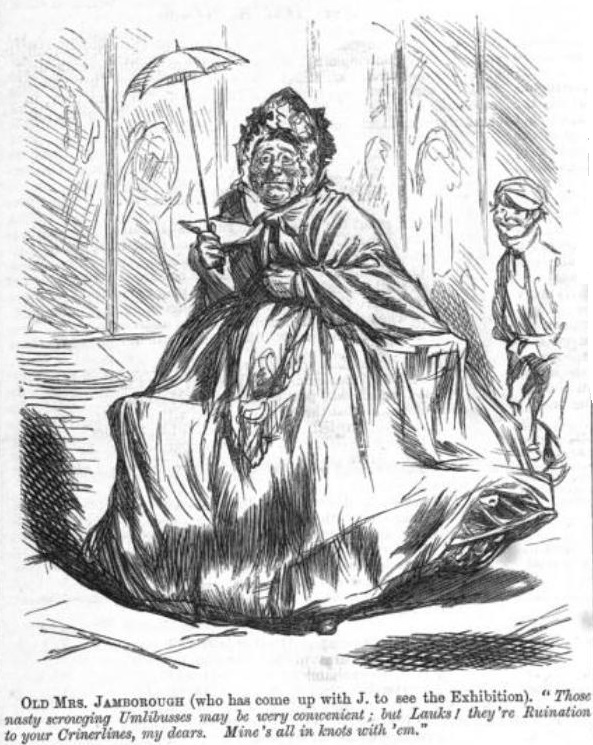
Old Mrs Jamborough. Punch, 14 June 1862, satirising the fashion for crinolines popular at the time

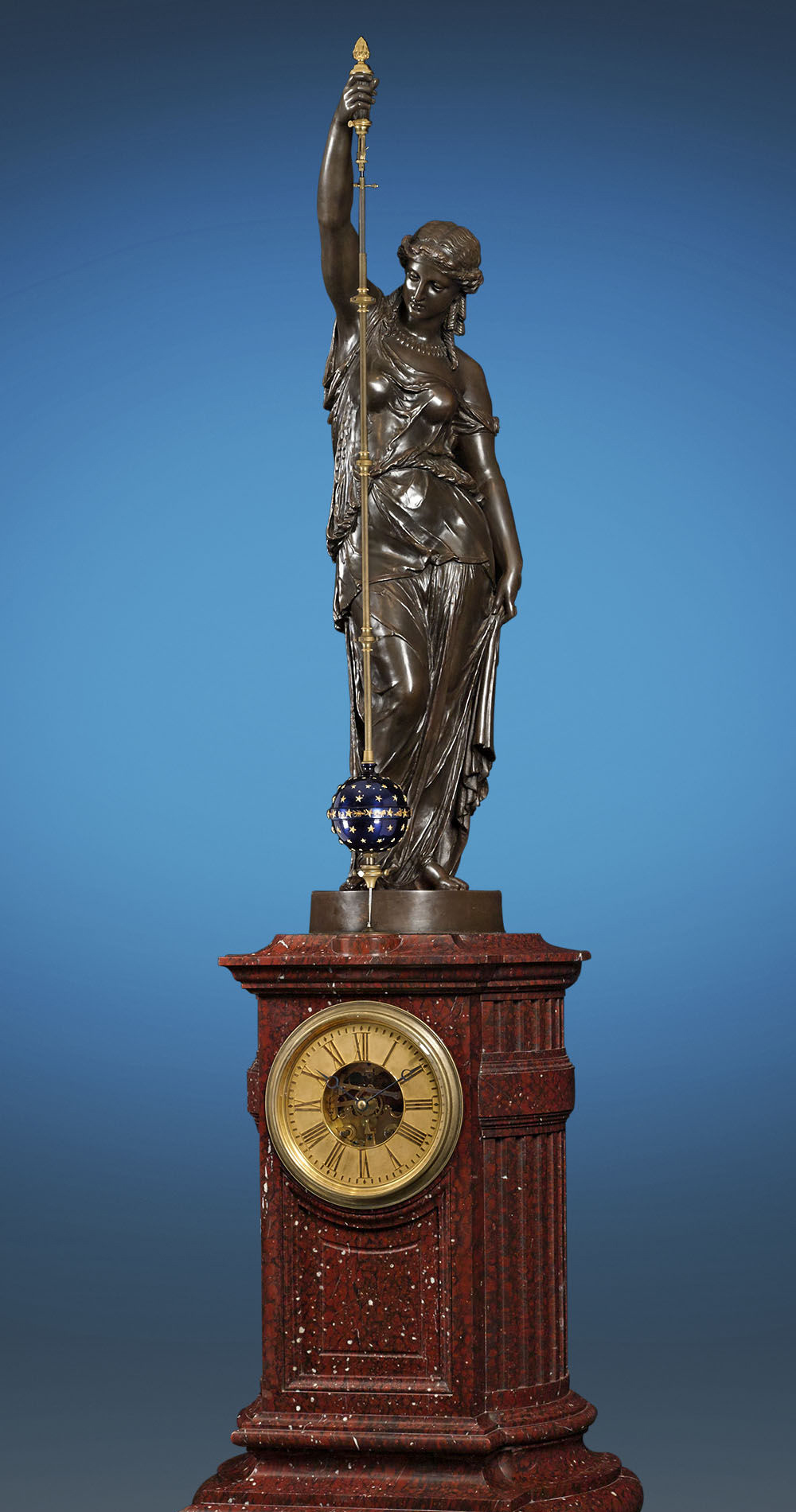
Sculpture of Urania by Carrier-Belleuse atop conical mystery clock by Eugène Farcot, made for the expo

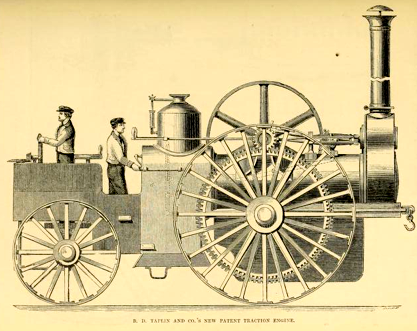
16 Horsepower traction engine exhibited by Taplin of Lincoln

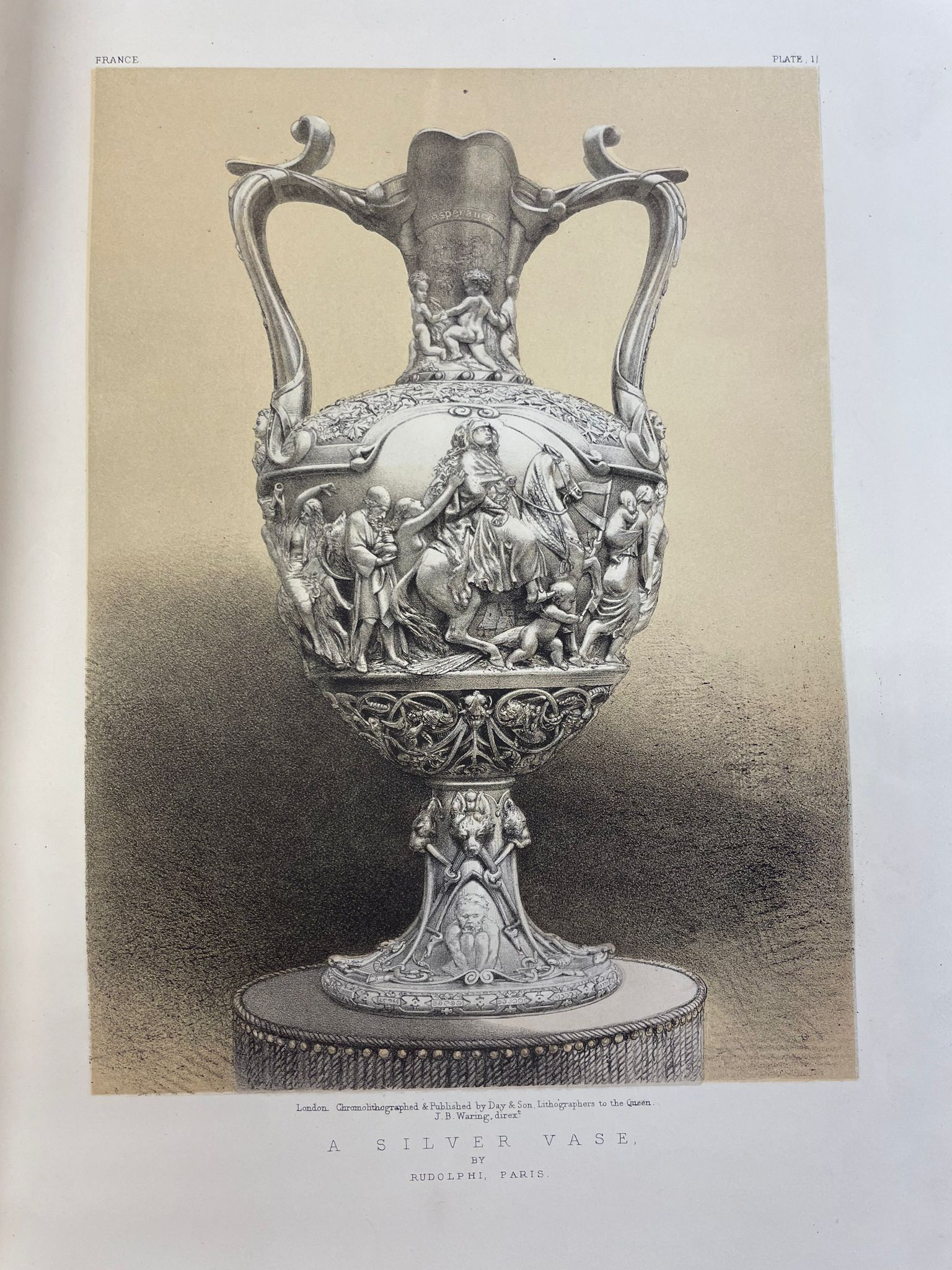
A silver vase by Rudolf, Paris

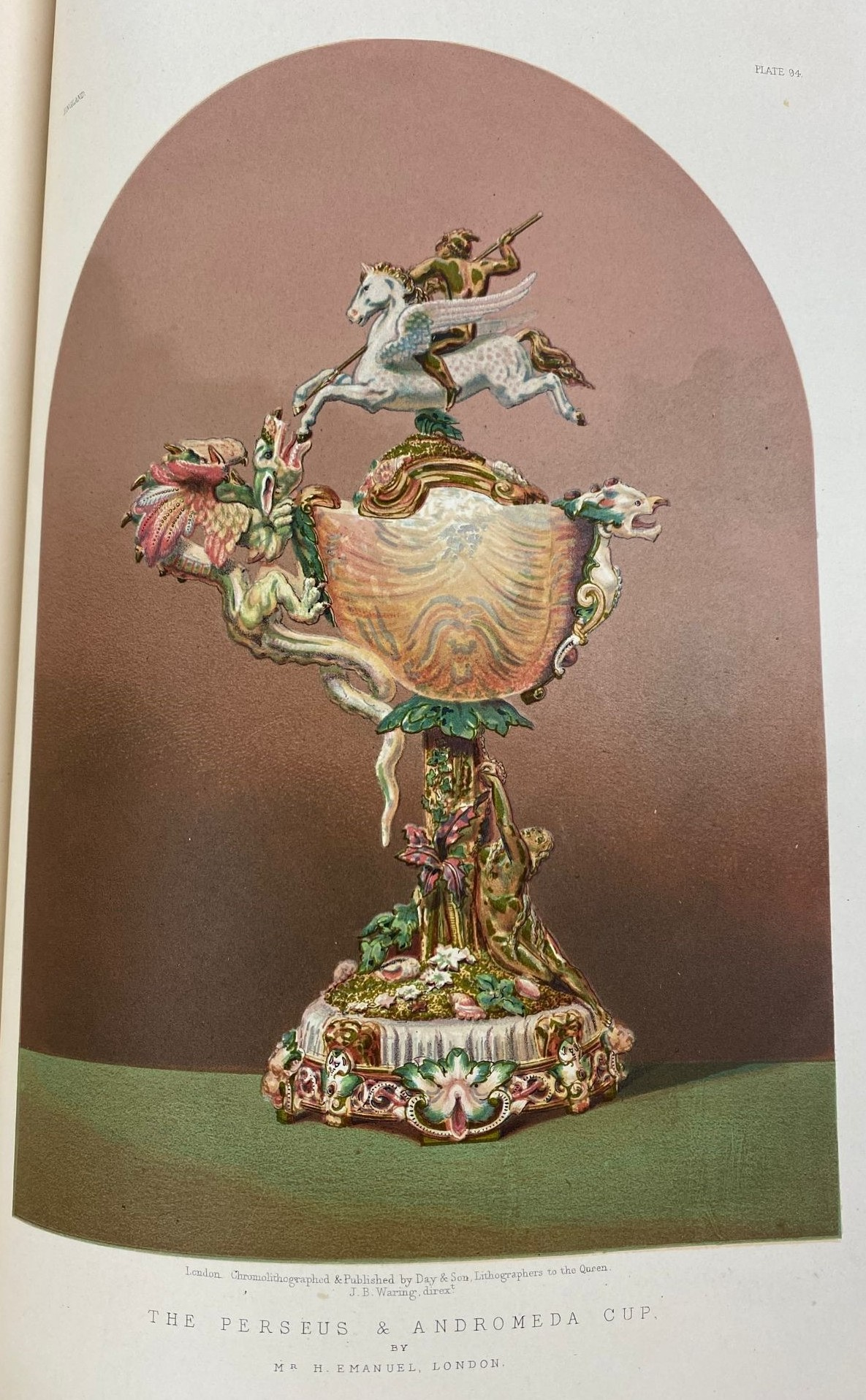
The Perseus and Andromeda cup

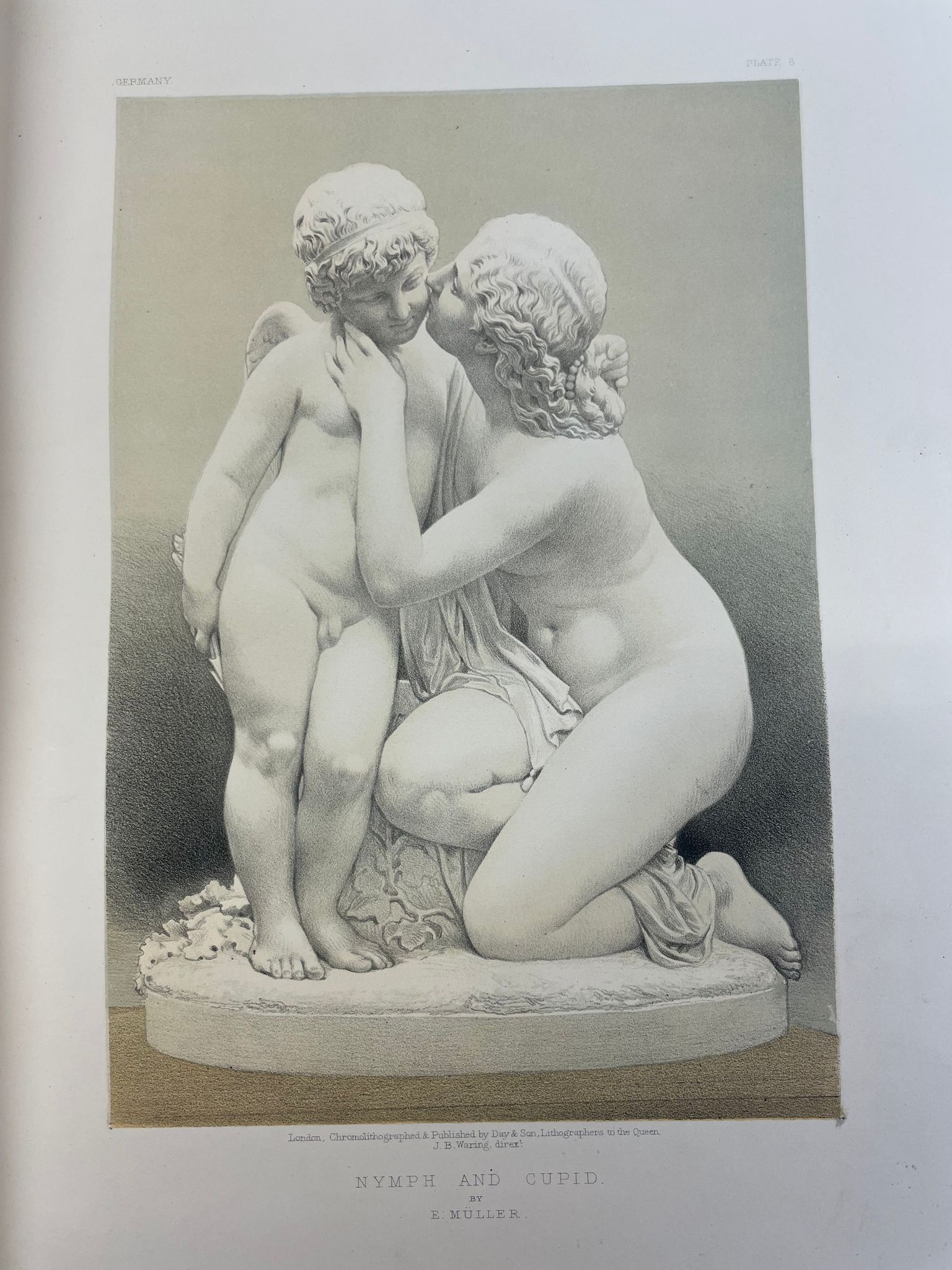
Nymph and Cupid by J. E. Muller
