= A Village Lost and Found =

2009 book by Brian May and Elena Vidal

- Cover image
- Author: Brian May and Elena Vidal
- Illustrator: T. R. Williams
- Language: English
- Subject: Photography
- Publisher: Frances Lincoln
- Publication date: 22 October 2009
- Publication place: United Kingdom
- Pages: 240 (with 560 photographs)
- ISBN: 978-0-7112-3039-2

A Village Lost and Found: Scenes in Our Village by T. R. Williams is the full title of a book released in 2009 by Brian May and Elena Vidal. The book is an annotated collection of stereoscopic photographs taken by the Victorian era photographer T. R. Williams. It is sold with an OWL focussing stereoscope designed by Dr. May.

== Overview and origins ==
Thomas Richard Williams (1824–1871), commonly known as T. R. Williams, was one of the early English pioneers of the techniques for taking stereoscopic (three-dimensional) photographs. In 1856 he published Scenes in Our Village, a series of 59 stereoscopic photographs depicting life in a rural English village. At the time of publication Williams did not disclose the location of the village.

Co-author Brian May (best known for being the guitarist of the band Queen and for his work in astrophysics) became an enthusiast of stereoscope photographs as a child, and first encountered the work of T. R. Williams during the late 1960s. In 2003 May announced a search in order to identify the actual location of the Scenes in Our Village images. In 2004 May reported that he had identified the location as the village of Hinton Waldrist in Oxfordshire.
