= George Swan Nottage =

Rt Hon George Swan Nottage
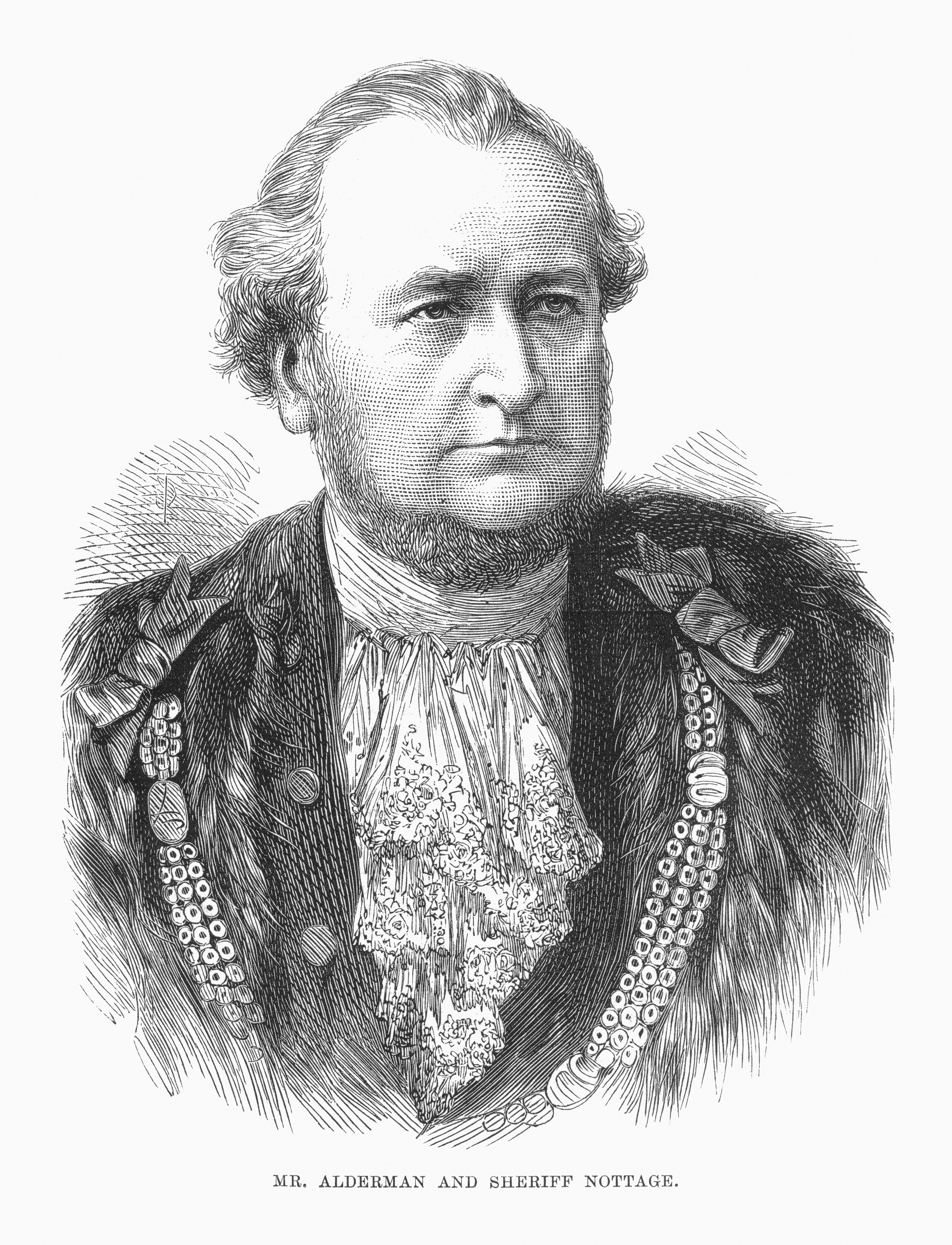
- George Swan Nottage in 1877
- Born: 1823
- Died: 11 April 1885; Mansion House, City of London
- Resting place: St Paul's Cathedral
- Occupation: Businessman
- Known for: London Stereoscopic and Photographic Company
- Title: Lord Mayor of London
- Term: 9 November 1884 – 11 April 1885
- Predecessor: Sir Robert Fowler
- Successor: Sir Robert Fowler
- Relatives: Robert Kennard (uncle); Thomas Challis (uncle)
- Honors: Order of the Cross of Takovo (Serbia)

George Swan Nottage (1823 – 11 April 1885) was a British politician, businessman, and photographer. In 1884 he was elected as Lord Mayor of London, and subsequently became the most recent person to die whilst holding the office.

Nottage died after a bout of bronchitis (or pleurisy) on 11 April 1885, when still in office. This entitled him to burial in St Paul's Cathedral, where, following a funeral service, his coffin was interred in the crypt.

== See also ==
- City of London Corporation
