= London Stereoscopic and Photographic Company =

British photographic studio (active 1854–1922)

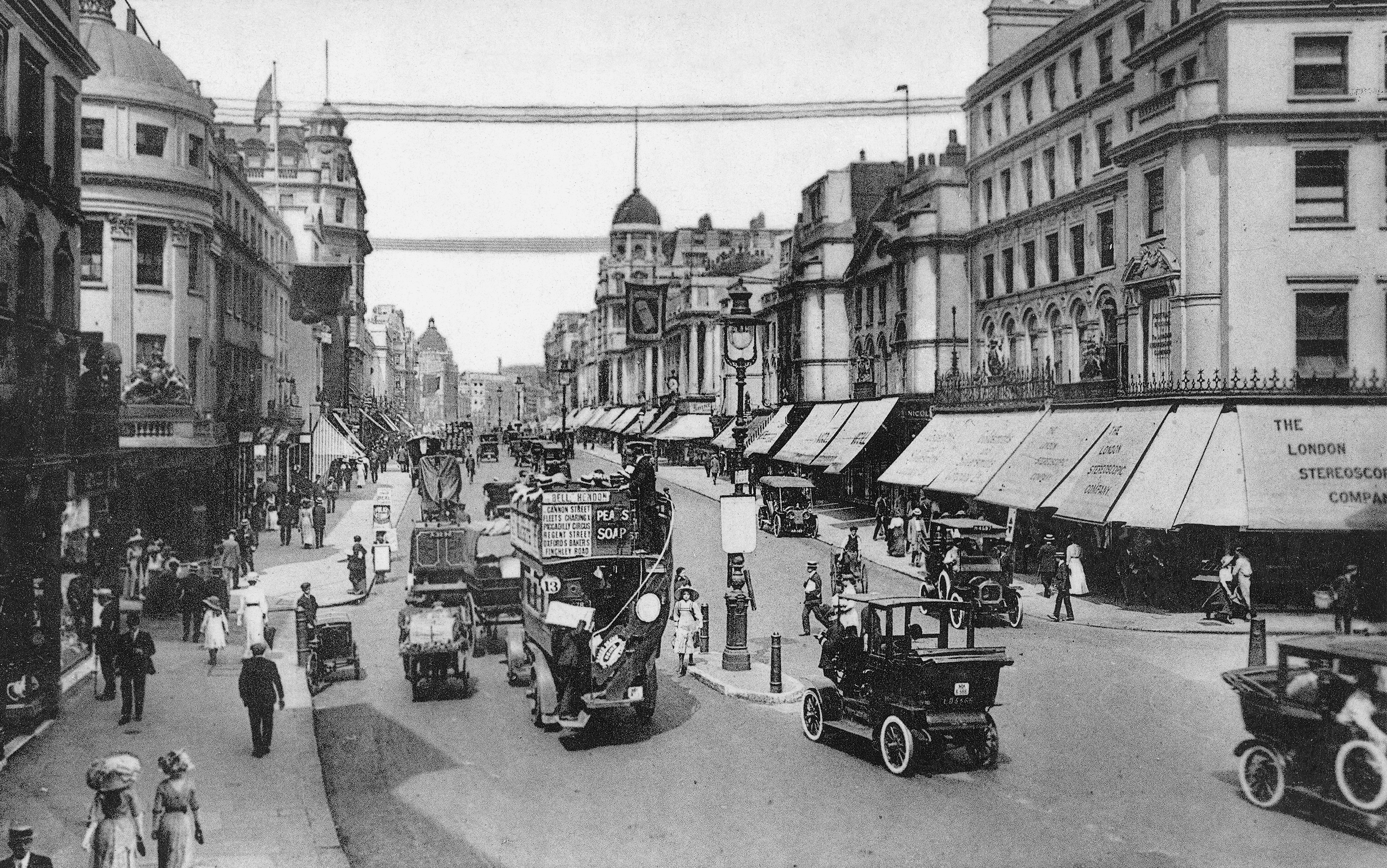
- Premises of London Stereoscopic; Company (right) on Regent Street, c. 1910, from an old postcard
- Company type: Private
- Industry: Photography
- Founded: 1854; 172 years ago
- Defunct: 1922; 104 years ago
- Headquarters: 54 Cheapside, London; 313 Oxford Street, London; 108–110 Regent Street, London
- Key people: George Swan Nottage (founder), Howard John Kennard (founder), Thomas Richard Williams, William England
- Products: Photographs, stereo cards, postcards, novelties

The London Stereoscopic and Photographic Company was founded in 1854 by George Swan Nottage and Howard John Kennard (the son of Robert Kennard and grandfather of Jean Orr-Ewing). Known initially as the London Stereoscope Company, in 1856 it changed its name to the London Stereoscopic Company, then in May 1859, became the London Stereoscopic and Photographic Company. For most purposes, however, it was (and still is) referred to as the London Stereoscopic Company (LSC).

The firm appears to have been based originally at 313 Oxford Street, with an agent, William Williams, at 29 Moorgate Street. It soon opened its own branch in the City of London at 54 Cheapside, which is first recorded in 1856. The Oxford Street store relocated to 108–110 Regent Street in 1866–1867. (Note: In newspapers of the period, the Regent Street address first appears in 1866, but is given as number 110 only. The following year, this becomes 108–110 and there is reference to a "new" photographic studio. In two adverts appearing in different publications on 21 December 1867, the company is stated as being at 108–110 and 110 Regent Street, so the fact that only number 110 is mentioned may not necessarily imply that the company did not occupy number 108 also.)

The London Stereoscopic Company was dissolved in 1922, although a business bearing the same name was established in 2005, championed by rock guitarist Brian May.

== Photographers ==
The company's principal photographer was William England; others included Thomas Richard Williams, Edward Pocock and Robert Howlett.

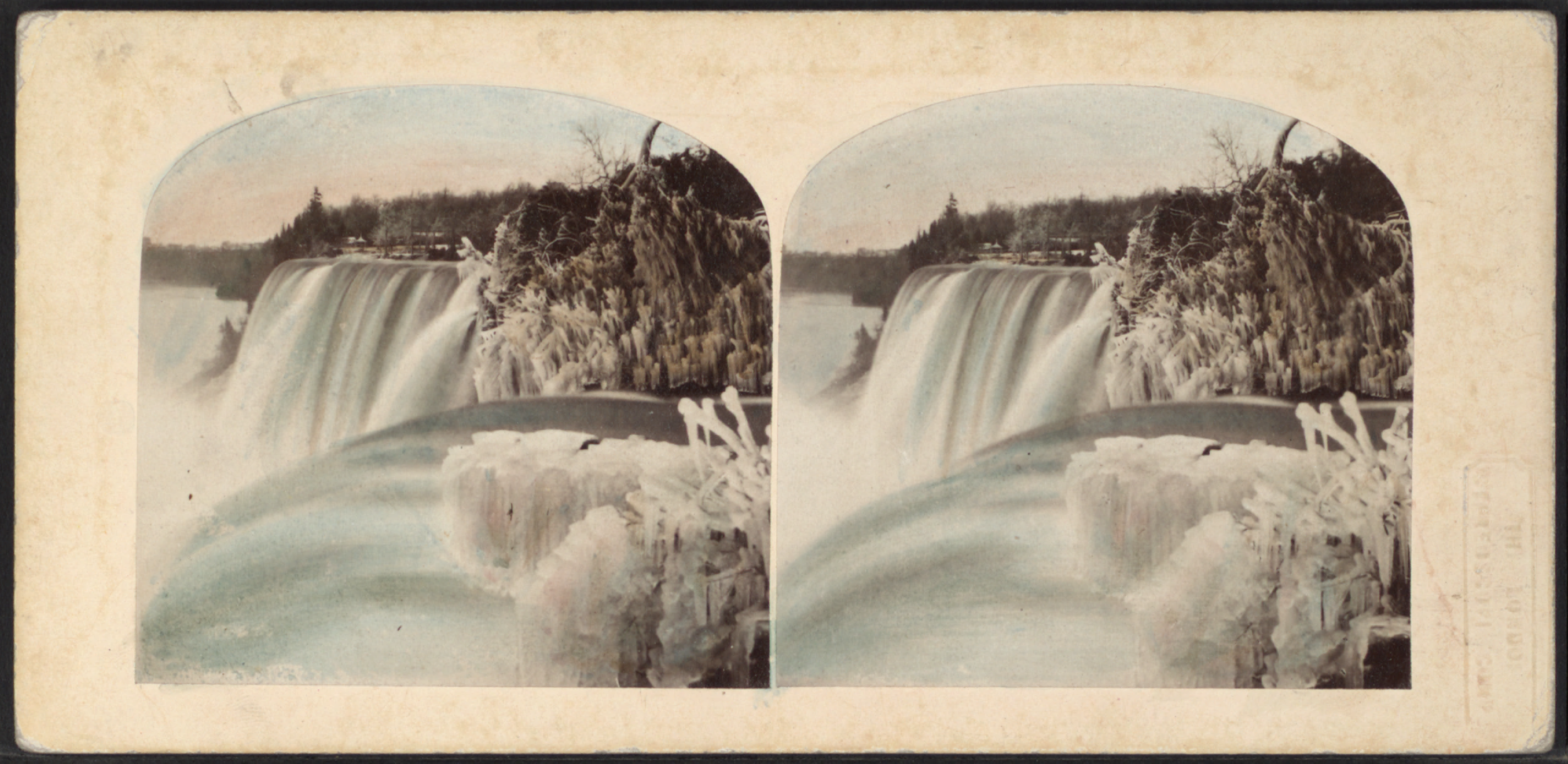
Niagara Falls (c.1858)

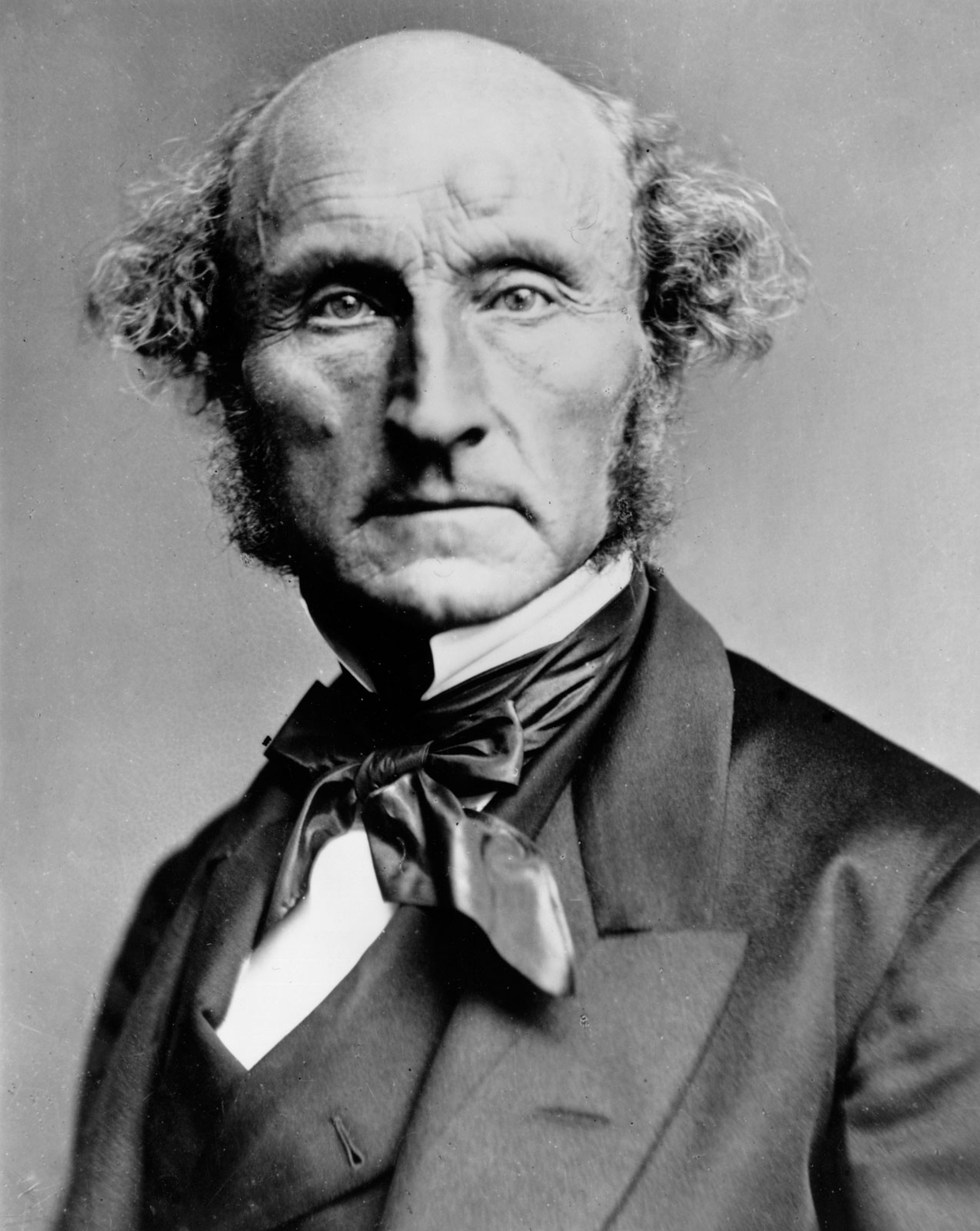
John Stuart Mill (c.1870)

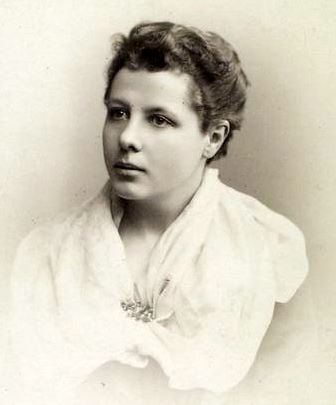
Annie Besant (1880s)

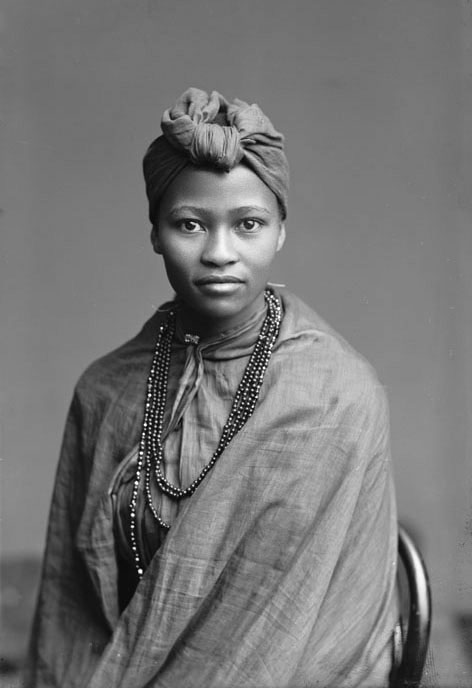
Frances Gqoba of the African Choir (1891)

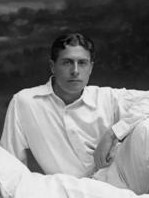
Laurence Doherty (1900)
