= William Russell Sedgfield =

British Photographer

William Russell Sedgfield (1826–1906) was an English photographer.

== Biography ==
Sedgfield was born in Devizes, Wiltshire. At age 16 he applied to Henry Fox Talbot who lived nearby for a license to produce calotype photography. He worked from the age of 18 as a wood engraver for Punch which would help him in his later career as a photographer through his familiarity with chemical processes. Sedgfield married Elizabeth Knight in 1857. He would become an active photographer across England, both in and around his hometown of Devizes and elsewhere. Sedgfield later moved to live and work in Hemel Hempstead and London. While in London he resided in Canonbury and Kingston upon Thames where he would die.

Sedgfield also wrote a number of books on his photography such as Photographic Delineations of the Scenery, Architecture and Antiquities of Great Britain and Ireland and Photographic. Delineations and The Thames, Illustrated with Photographs. He also contributed to a number of photographic journals, and provided illustrations for various books. Outside of these often topographical illustration works he would practise portrait photography.
