= Edward Pocock (artist) =

English artist and illustrator

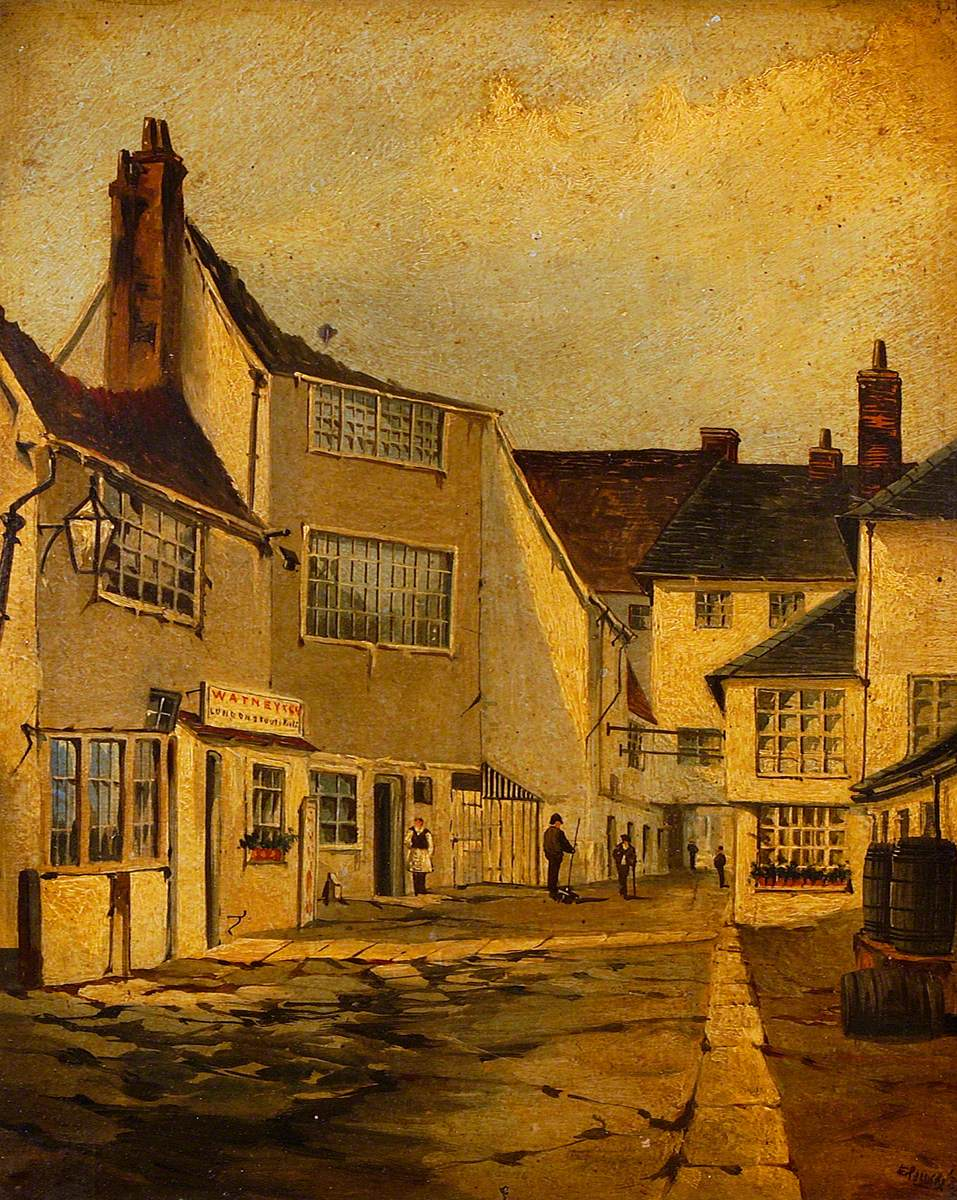
Old Yard of Crown and Anchor, Edward Pocock, 1887

Edward Charles Pocock (1843–1905) was an English artist and illustrator most noted for his topographical views of East Anglia, particularly Ipswich and Norwich.

Pocock was born at Newbury, Berkshire to Thomas Pocock and his wife Rosanna Wellman. The family moved to London where the resided at 130 Fenchurch Street, until his father died in 1859 and his mother in 1867. Pocock married Margaret Harrington and moved to Bexley, Kent while developing his career first as an artist and draughtsman, and later also as a lithographer working for the London Illustrated News. He frequently signed his work "E. Pococke".

In 1890 he exhibited at the Ipswich Fine Art Club, but subsequently moved to Norwich. Pocock was also a photographer.

Some of his paintings are in the Ipswich Borough Council collection at Ipswich Museum and Christchurch Mansion. Pocock has an example of his work held in the permanent collections of the Time and Tide Museum in Great Yarmouth, and multiple works in the Norfolk Museums Collections/Cromer Museum. The Norfolk Record Office has some of his papers in their archive.
