= Kerdroya =

Art project in Cornwall, UK

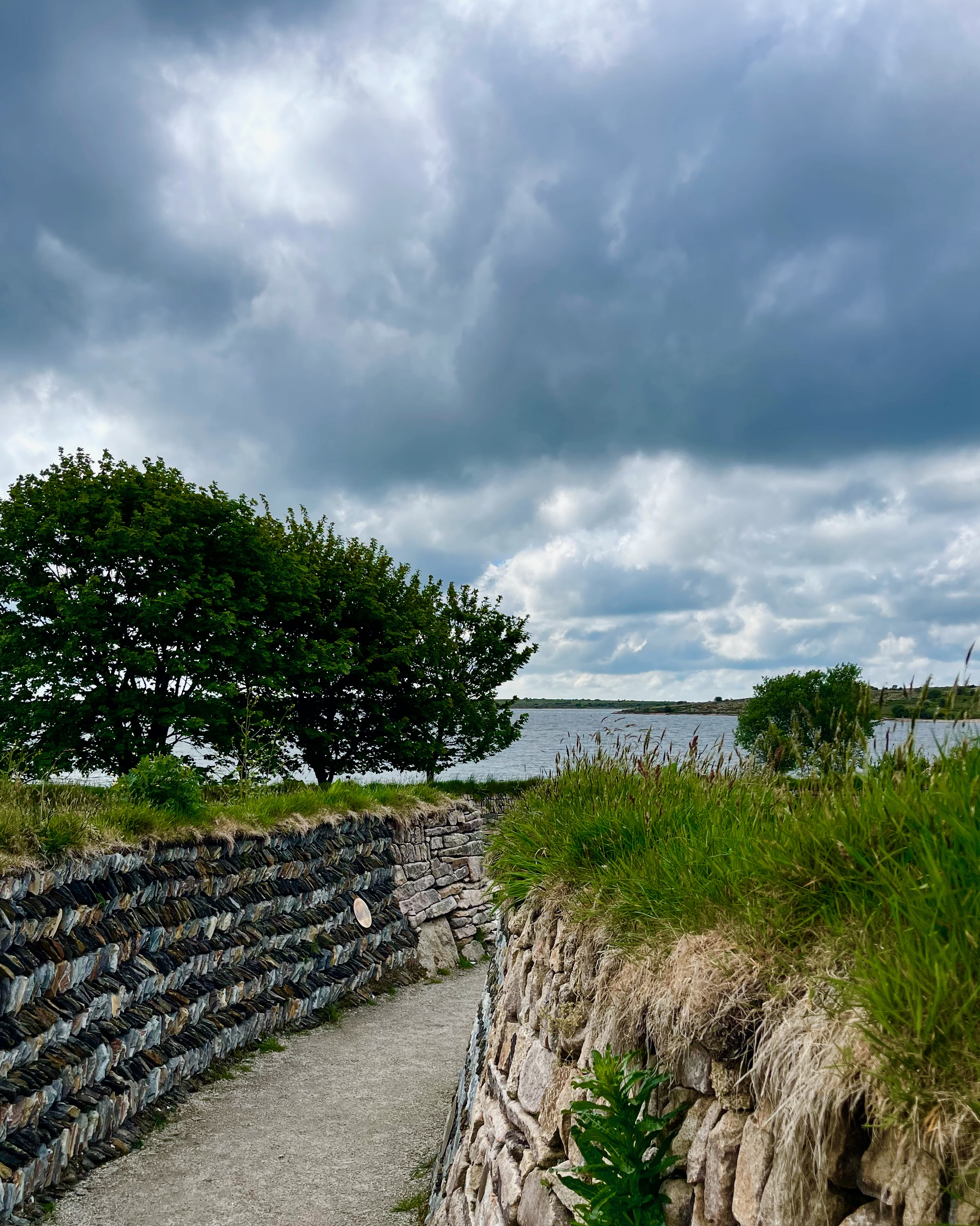
Labyrinth Colliford Lake Cornwall

Kerdroya is a stone labyrinth built on a disused carpark at Colliford Lake in Cornwall, southwest England. The project, built with different types of Cornish hedging, took seven years to complete and was instigated by Will Coleman. A thousand volunteers and 5,000 schoolchildren helped build it and about 150 people received training in the craft of hedging during the build, completed in 2025.

The land art project is the world's largest stone labyrinth at 56 metres (184 ft) wide.

More than 140,000 regional stones were used including Bodmin Moor granite, serpentine stone from the Lizard and West Penwith stone. In the centre is a metal art installation made by Thomas and Gary Thrussell, father and son metal artists.

Corporate sponsors include South West Water, Cornwall National Landscape, National Lottery Heritage Fund, Cornwall Council, Arts Council England and the Guild of Cornish Hedgers.

The name Kerdroya is a Cornish word that roughly translates as "castle of turnings".
