= Colliford Lake =

Reservoir on Bodmin Moor, Cornwall, England

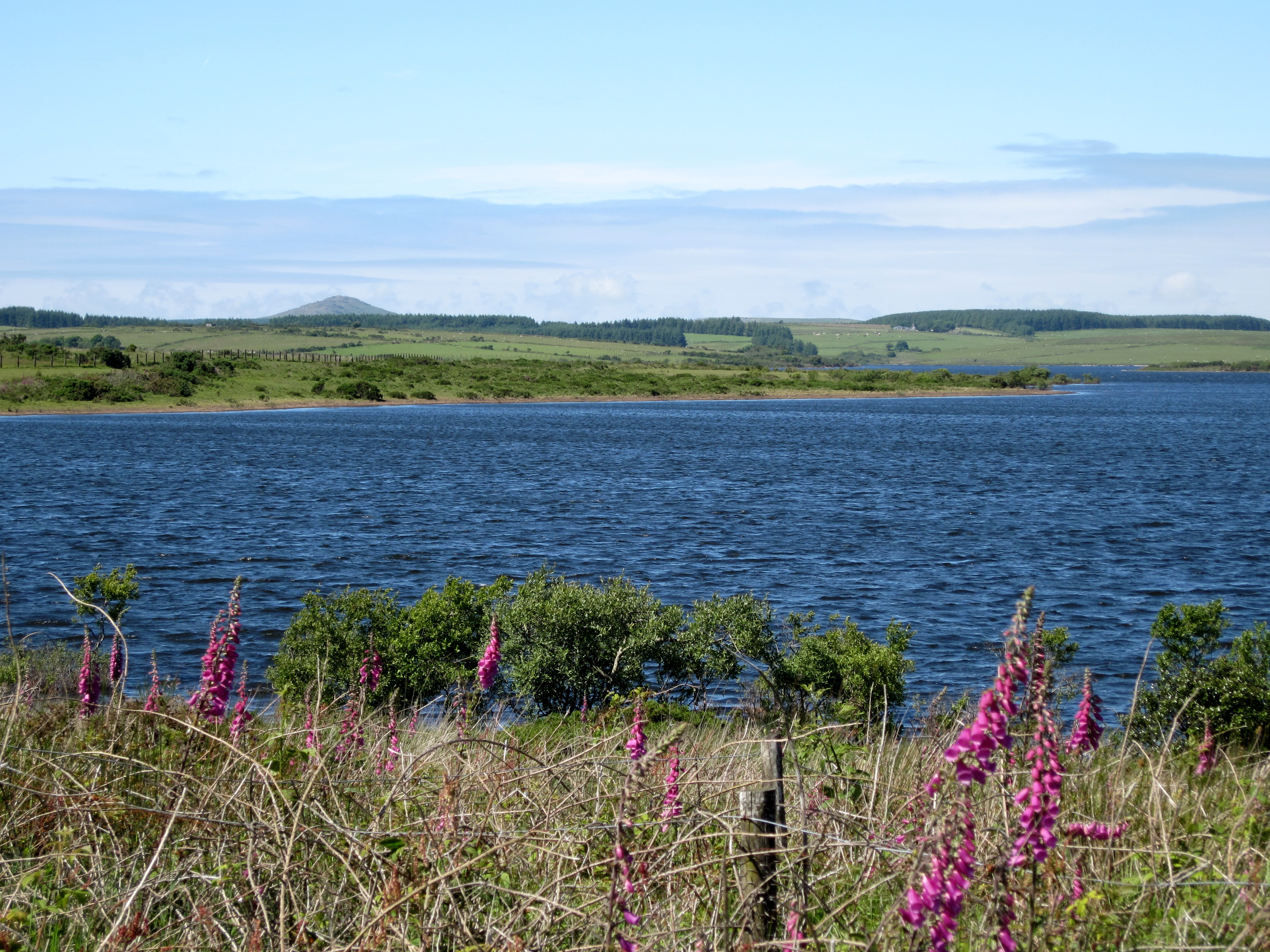

- Location within Cornwall
- Location: Bodmin Moor, Cornwall, England, United Kingdom
- Coordinates: 50.5277°N 4.5710°W
- Surface area: 900 acres (3.6 km^{2})

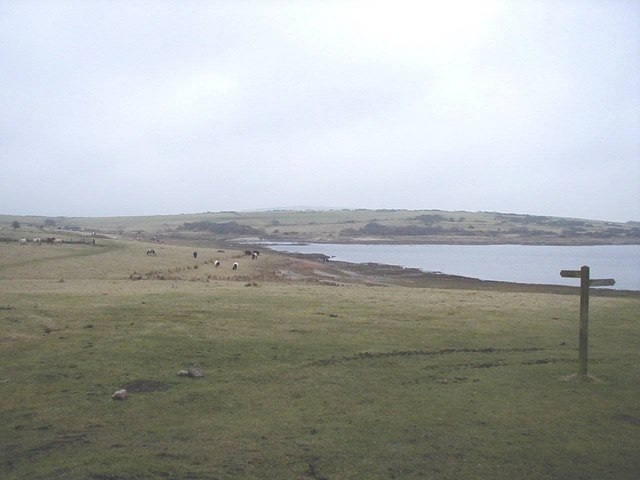
Northwest end of Colliford Lake

Colliford Lake is a reservoir on Bodmin Moor, Cornwall, England, United Kingdom. Covering more than 900 acres (3.6 km^{2}), with the ability to hold 28,540 megalitres (28.54B litres), it is the largest lake in Cornwall. Between 1983 and 1984 a dam was constructed, impounding water from the River St Neot, creating a water supply bigger than all of Cornwall's other reservoirs combined. It is situated south of the A30 trunk road near the village of Bolventor, the approximate centre of the lake being at OS grid reference SX179730. Dozmary Pool outfalls into the lake and the lake's own outfall forms one of the tributaries of the River Fowey.

The northernmost point of the lake is approximately three-quarters of a mile (1 km) south of Bolventor at OS grid reference SX184756 and the headbank at the southernmost point is approximately three miles (5 km) south of Bolventor at OS grid reference SX177709.

Leisure facilities on the site include angling and a 50-acre (200,000 m^{2}) adventure and nature park, Colliford Lake Park, which features trails and footpaths, play areas, wetlands, picnic areas and a cafe.

Colliford Lake is managed by the South West Lakes Trust, an environmental and recreational charity which manages fifty inland water sites in Cornwall, Devon, and Somerset.

In 2026 a labyrinth called Kerdroya was completed on the site. The project built with Cornish hedging took seven years and was instigated by Will Coleman. A thousand volunteers and 5,000 schoolchildren helped build it and about 150 people received training in the craft of hedging during the build.

== See also ==
- List of reservoirs and dams in the United Kingdom
