= Justice Walk =

Street in Chelsea, London

Coordinates: 51°29′02″N 0°10′16″W

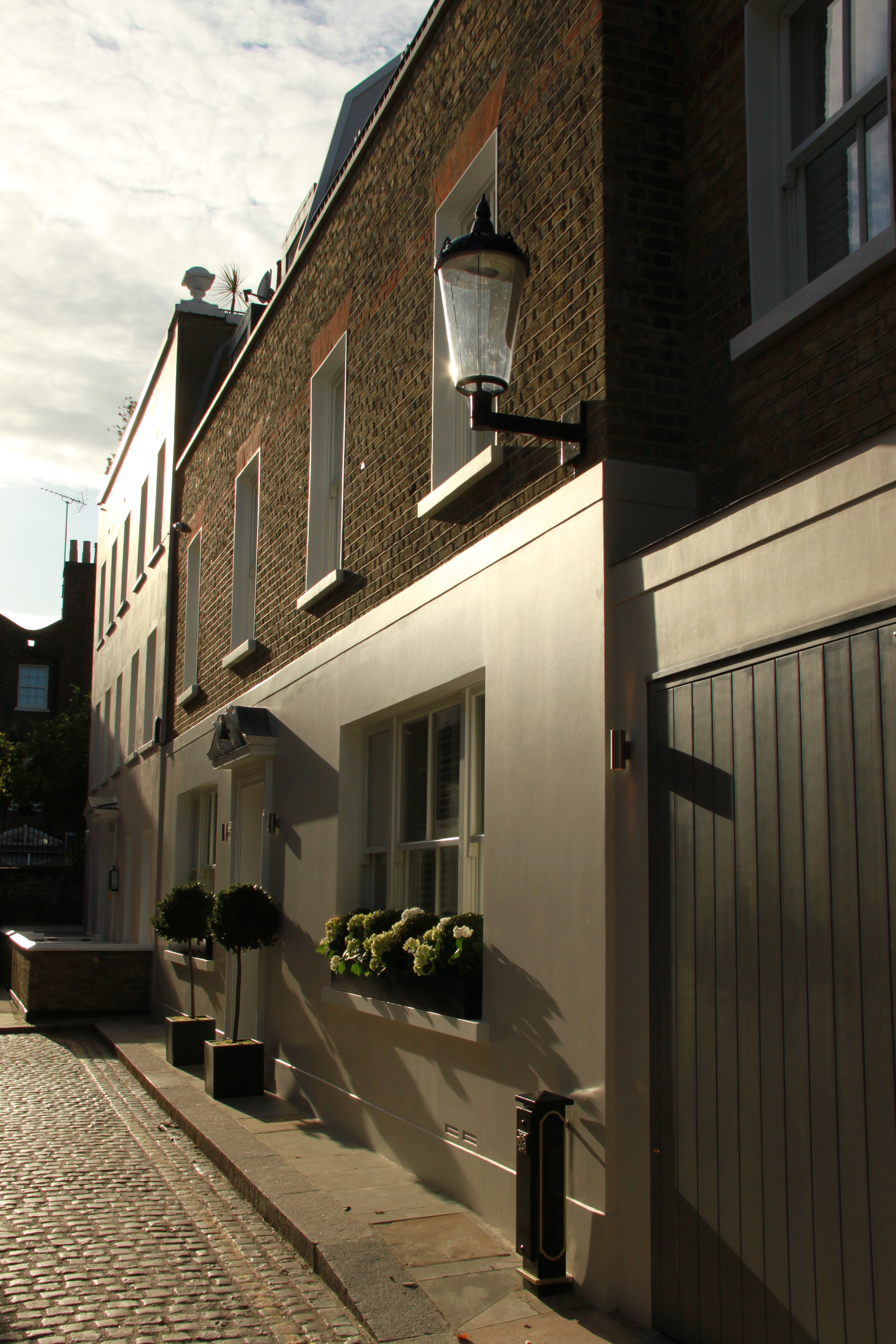
Justice Walk (2011)

Justice Walk is a passageway in the Royal Borough of Kensington and Chelsea. It runs between Old Church Street and Lawrence Street.

== History ==
The street is mostly made up of 18th and early 19th century homes, with its most notable building being a former Wesleyan chapel, now known as the Court House. Justice Walk is believed to have derived its name from Sir Henry Fielding, the author, magistrate, and founder of London's first professional police force, who lived nearby.

== Notable buildings ==
No.9 The Court House, was constructed as a chapel in 1841

No.1 was described in the London County Council 1913 survey of London as is a "good house". with a doorway "of excellent design, and some good wrought iron balconies occur to the windows which overlook Lawrence Street."

No.2 is mid-18th century and has been grade II listed since 1969.

No.8 was formerly two terraced cottages which were converted into a single dwelling in the Victorian period.

== Notable residents ==
Serena Armstrong-Jones, Countess of Snowdon lived at number 5 Justice Walk, as The Hon. Serena Alleyne Stanhope, before she married David Armstrong-Jones, 2nd Earl of Snowdon.

Sylvia Bourne, an art dealer and philanthropist and her husband Graham Bourne, a property developer, lived at No.9, The Court House.

The C18th Chelsea Porcelain Factory was situated at the corner of Justice Walk and Old Lawrence Street.

From 2002 until 2011 the Princess of Wales (as Miss Catherine Middleton) lived in a flat on Old Church Street which lies adjacent to the west end of Justice Walk.

== Attempted murder ==
In February 2024, Maximillian Bourne, the son of art dealer and philanthropist Sylvia Pessoa Bourne and property developer Graham Bourne, was charged with attempted murder after repeatedly stabbing their live-in maid Joselia Pereira Do Nascimento inside No.9 Justice Walk.
