= Chelsea porcelain factory =

Porcelain manufactory in London, England

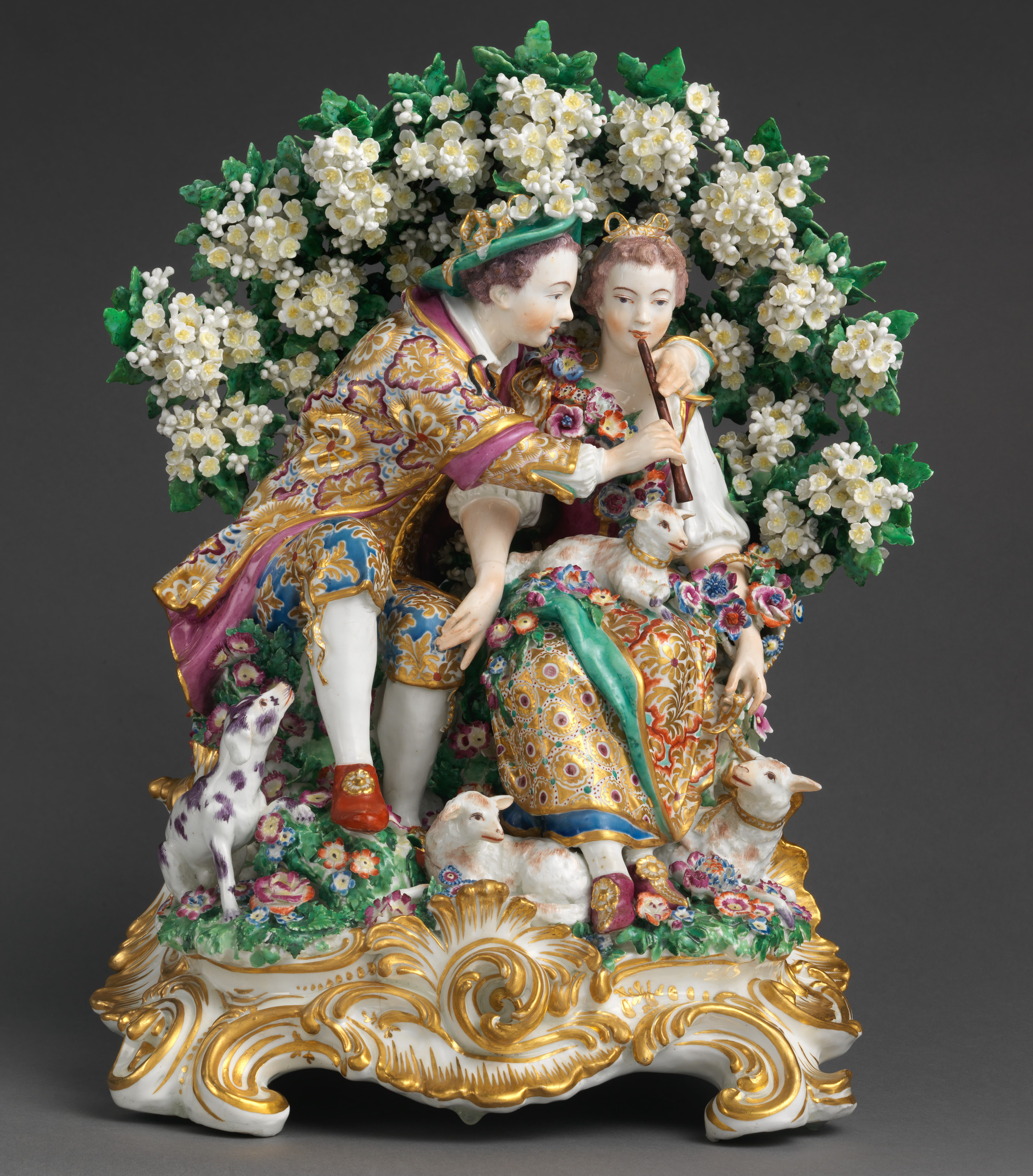
The Music Lesson, gold anchor, c. 1765, with bocage background. 15 3/8 × 12 1/4 × 8 3/4 inches, 22 lb. (39.1 × 31.1 × 22.2 cm, 10 kg). An example was sold for £8 in 1770; different version, different angle.

Chelsea porcelain is the porcelain made by the Chelsea porcelain manufactory, the first important porcelain manufactory in England, established around 1743–45, and operating independently until 1770, when it was merged with Derby porcelain. It made soft-paste porcelain throughout its history, though there were several changes in the "body" material and glaze used. Its wares were aimed at a luxury market, and its site in Chelsea, London, was close to the fashionable Ranelagh Gardens pleasure ground, opened in 1742.

The first known wares are the "goat and bee" cream jugs with seated goats at the base, some examples of which are incised with "Chelsea", "1745" and a triangle. The entrepreneurial director, at least from 1750, was Nicholas Sprimont, a Huguenot silversmith in Soho, but few private documents survive to aid a picture of the factory's history. Early tablewares, being produced in profusion by 1750, depend on Meissen porcelain models and on silverware prototypes, such as salt cellars in the form of realistic shells.

Chelsea was known for its figures, initially mostly single standing figures of the Cries of London and other subjects. Many of these were very small by European standards, from about 2 1/2 to 3 1/2 inches (6 to 9 cm) high, overlapping with the category of "Chelsea Toys", for which the factory was famous in the 1750s and 1760s. These were very small pieces which often had metal mounts and were functional as bonbonnières (little boxes), scent bottles, needlecases, étuis, thimbles and small seals, many with inscriptions in French, "almost invariably amorous suggestions", but often misspelled.

From about 1760, its inspiration was drawn more from Sèvres porcelain than Meissen, making grand garnitures of vases and elaborate large groups with seated couples in front of a bocage screen of flowering plants, all on a raised base of Rococo scrollwork. As with other English factories, much of the sales came from public auctions, held about once a year; copies of the catalogues for 1755, 1756 and (in part) 1761 are very useful to scholars. In 1770, the manufactory was purchased by William Duesbury, owner of the Derby porcelain factory, and the wares are indistinguishable during the "Chelsea-Derby period" that lasted until 1784, when the Chelsea factory was demolished and its moulds, patterns and many of its workmen and artists transferred to Derby.

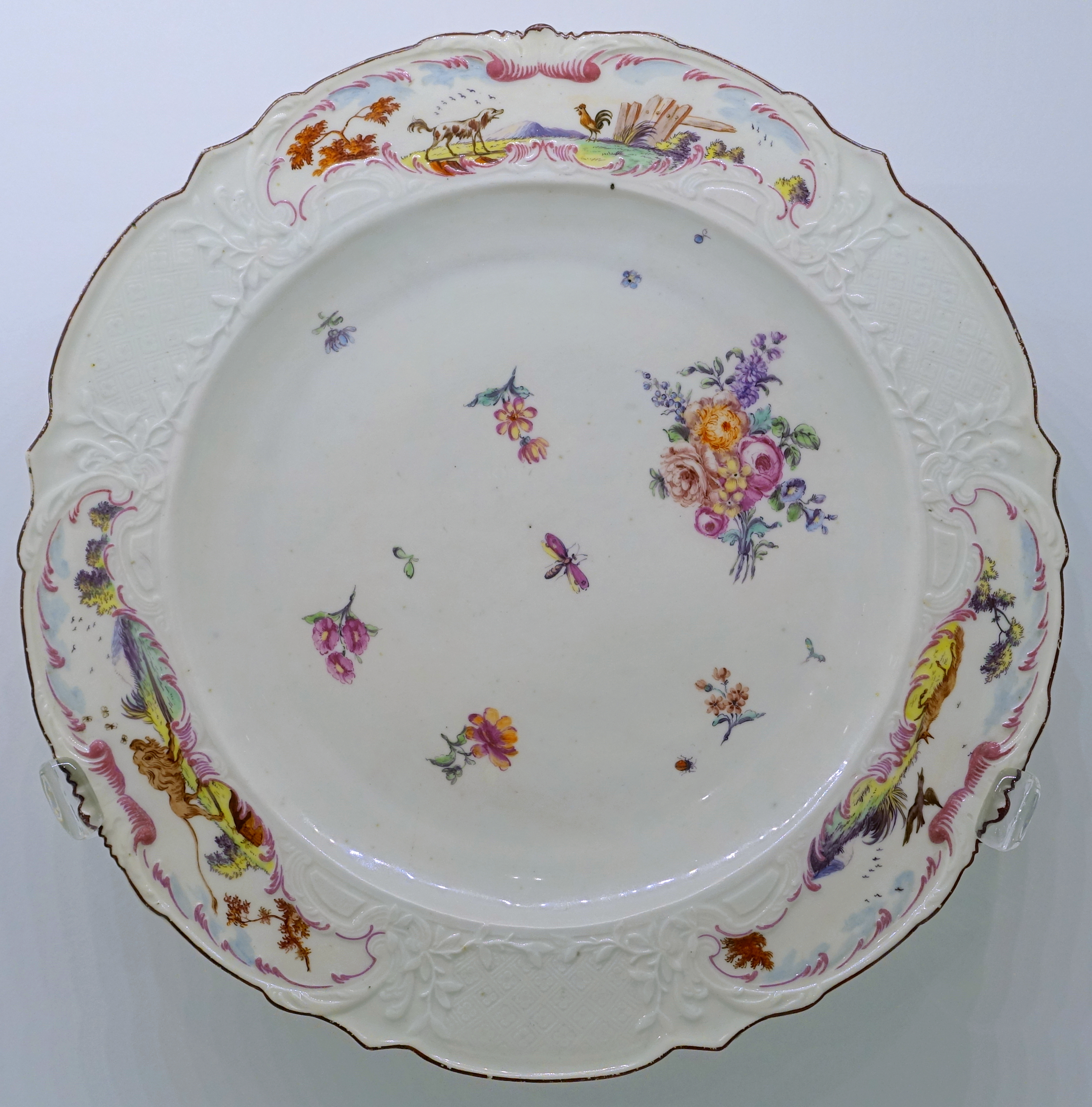
Plate, c. 1755, with three vignette scenes from Aesop's Fables

== Periods by marks ==
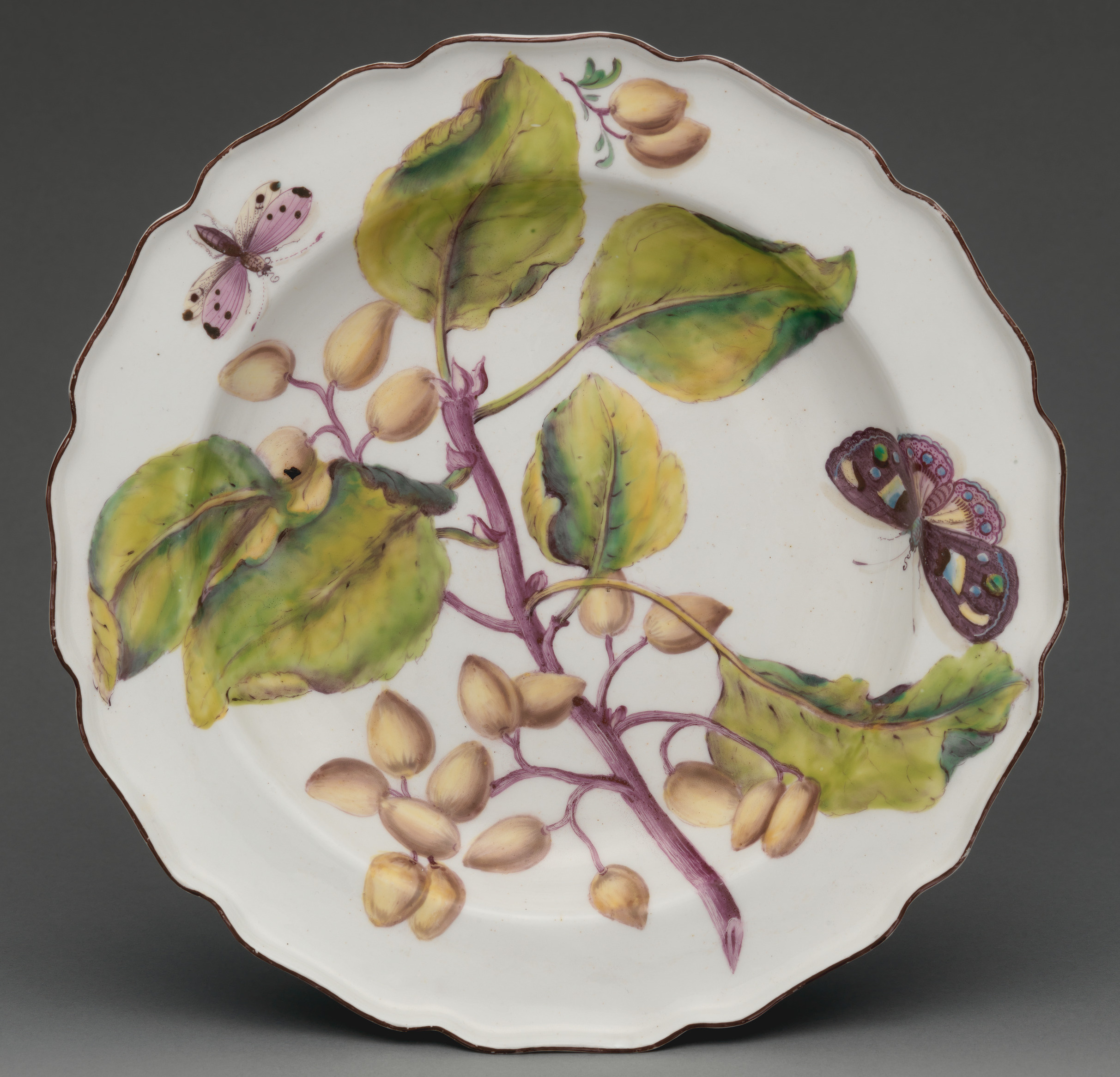
"Botanical" red anchor plate with spray of fruiting Indian bean tree, c. 1755

The factory history, before the merger with Derby, can be divided into four main periods, named for the identifying marks under the wares, although the changes in marks do not exactly coincide with changes in materials or style. Some pieces are unmarked in all periods, and there appears to be some overlapping of marks; indeed some pieces have two different marks. There are also anchor marks in blue and brown, and an extremely rare "crown and trident" mark in underglaze blue, known on only about 20 pieces, and thought to date from around 1749. A chipped beaker with this mark fetched £37,000 at auction in 2015.

Although the first three examples shown here are from the underside of the bases of pieces, where most porcelain factory marks are placed, the very small Chelsea anchor marks are often "tucked away in the most unexpected places". In the group of Chinese musicians, the tiny red anchor mark is visible on the raised base at ankle level, between the woman with the tambourine and the boy.

Incised triangle

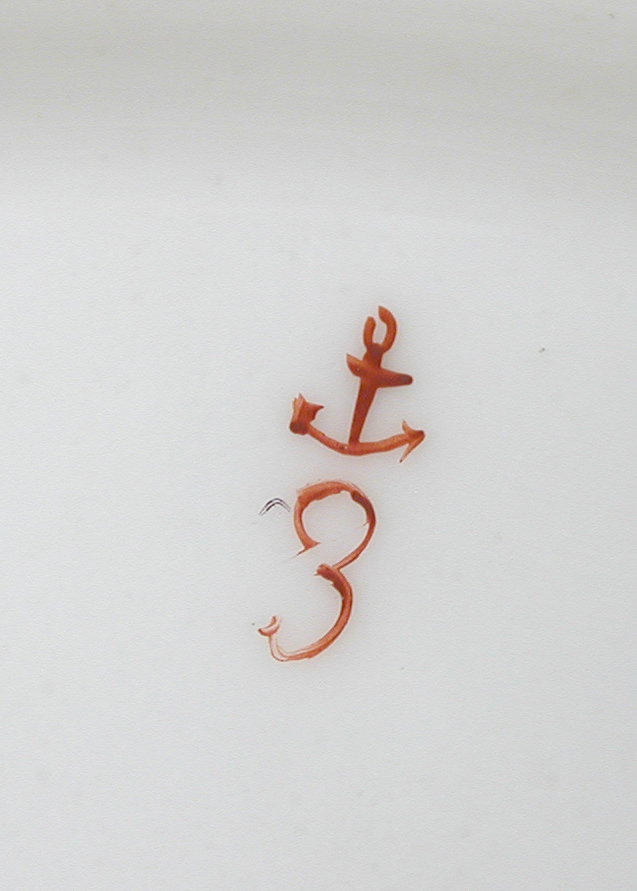
Red anchor

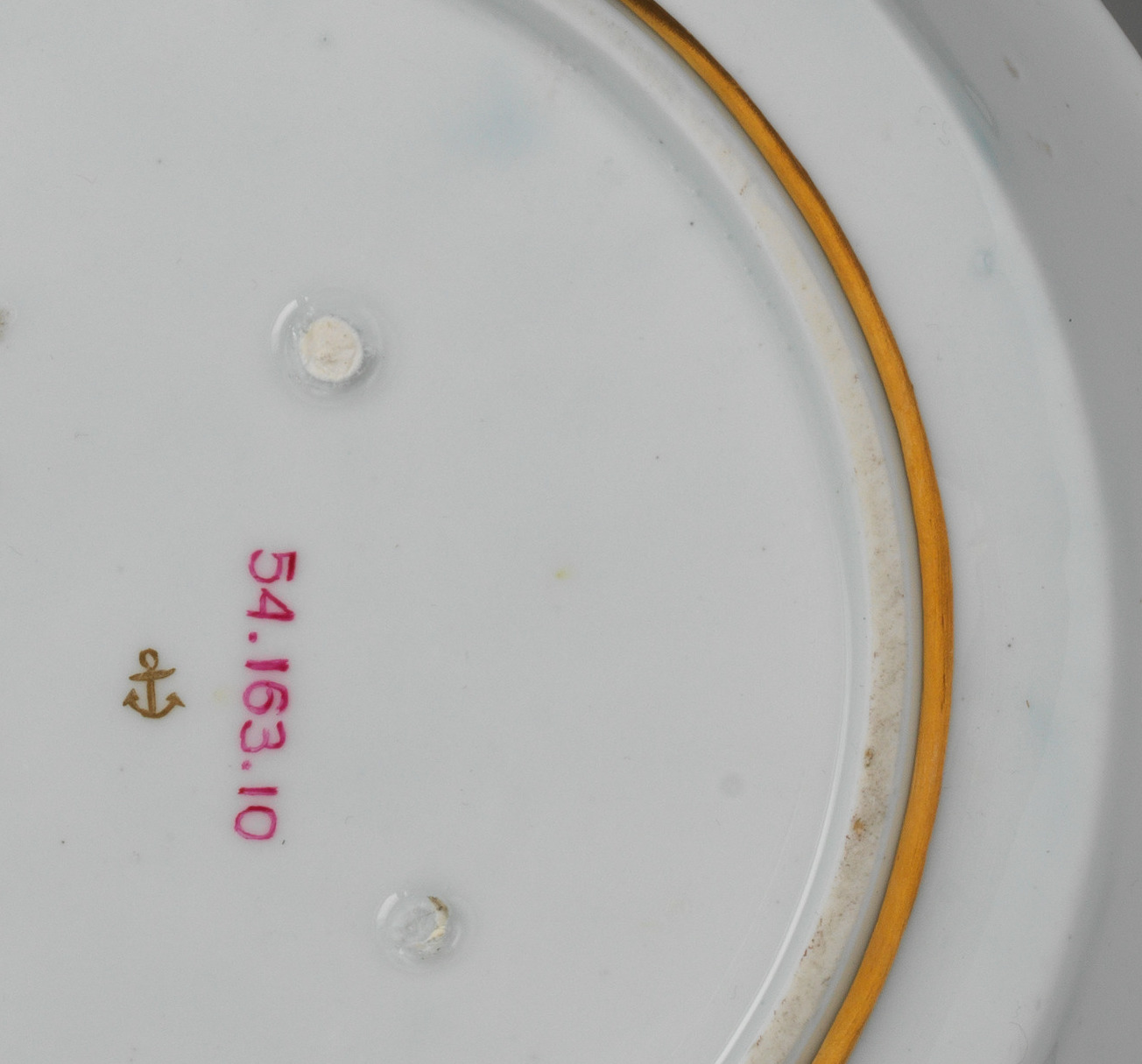
Gold anchor

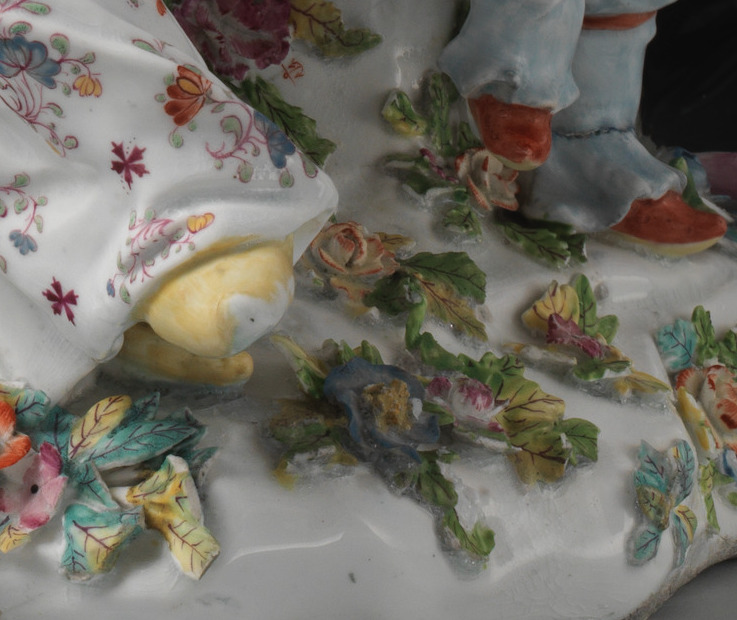
Red anchor (near top) from the group of Chinese musicians (shown below)

=== Triangle period (around 1743–1749) ===
These early products bore an incised triangle mark. Most of the wares were white and were strongly influenced by silverware designs. The early body was "a very translucent material, resembling milk-white glass", later changing "to a harder and rather colder-looking material". Slipcasting rather than pressing paste into the moulds was introduced during this period, and remained usual for Chelsea figures.

The most notable products of this era were white saltcellars in the shape of crayfish. Perhaps the most famous pieces are the Goat and Bee jugs that were also based on a silver model. Copies of these were made by Coalport porcelain in the 19th century. Sales were suspended in March 1749, which appears to be when Sprimont took control, and the factory was moved a short distance within Chelsea.

=== Raised anchor period (1749–1752) ===
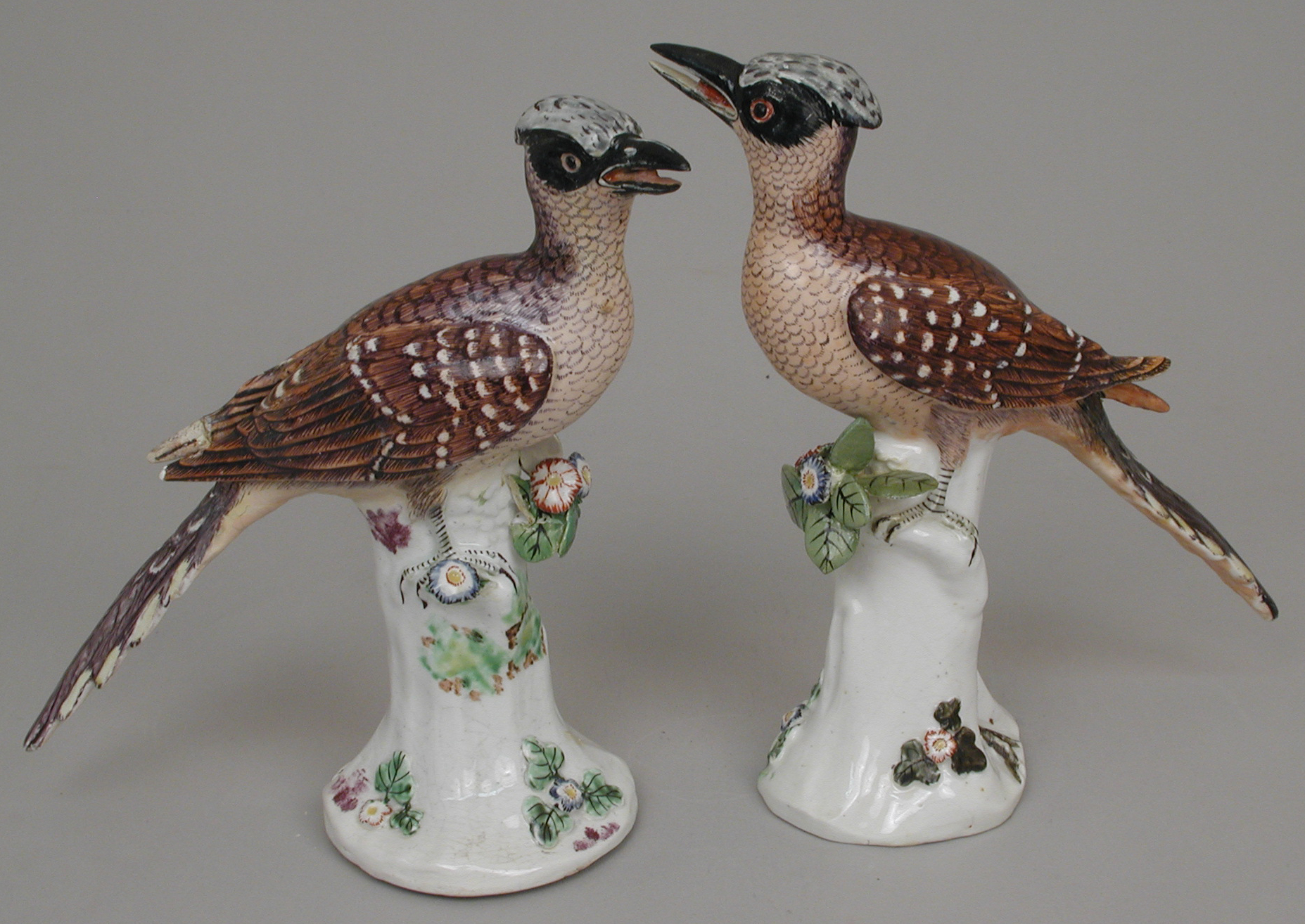
Pair of cuckoos, c. 1750, 8 in (20 cm) high, raised anchor mark

On 9 January 1750 Sprimont advertised the reopening of the factory, with "a great Variety of Pieces for Ornament in a Taste entirely new", and the new mark is assumed to celebrate this. The factory at the corner of Justice Walk and Old Lawrence Street in Chelsea, was very close to the Thames, and the anchor is a symbol of hope, and of Saint Nicolas of Myra, patron saint of seamen, after whom Sprimont was perhaps named.

The next six or so years were the most successful for the factory. In this period, the paste and glaze were modified to produce a clear, white, slightly opaque surface on which to paint. The influence of Meissen is evident in the classical figures among Italianate ruins and harbour scenes and adaptations from Francis Barlow's edition of Aesop's Fables. In 1751, copies were made of two Meissen services. Chelsea also made figures, birds and animals inspired by Meissen originals. Flowers and landscapes were copied from Vincennes porcelain (soon to move to Sèvres). A set of figures of pairs of birds were evidently based on the illustrations to A Natural History of Uncommon Birds, by George Edwards, published in four volumes from 1743 to 1751. The copies used were probably with uncoloured illustrations, as though the forms follow the illustrations well, the colouring of the figures is often eccentric and inaccurate.

=== Red anchor period (1752–1756) ===
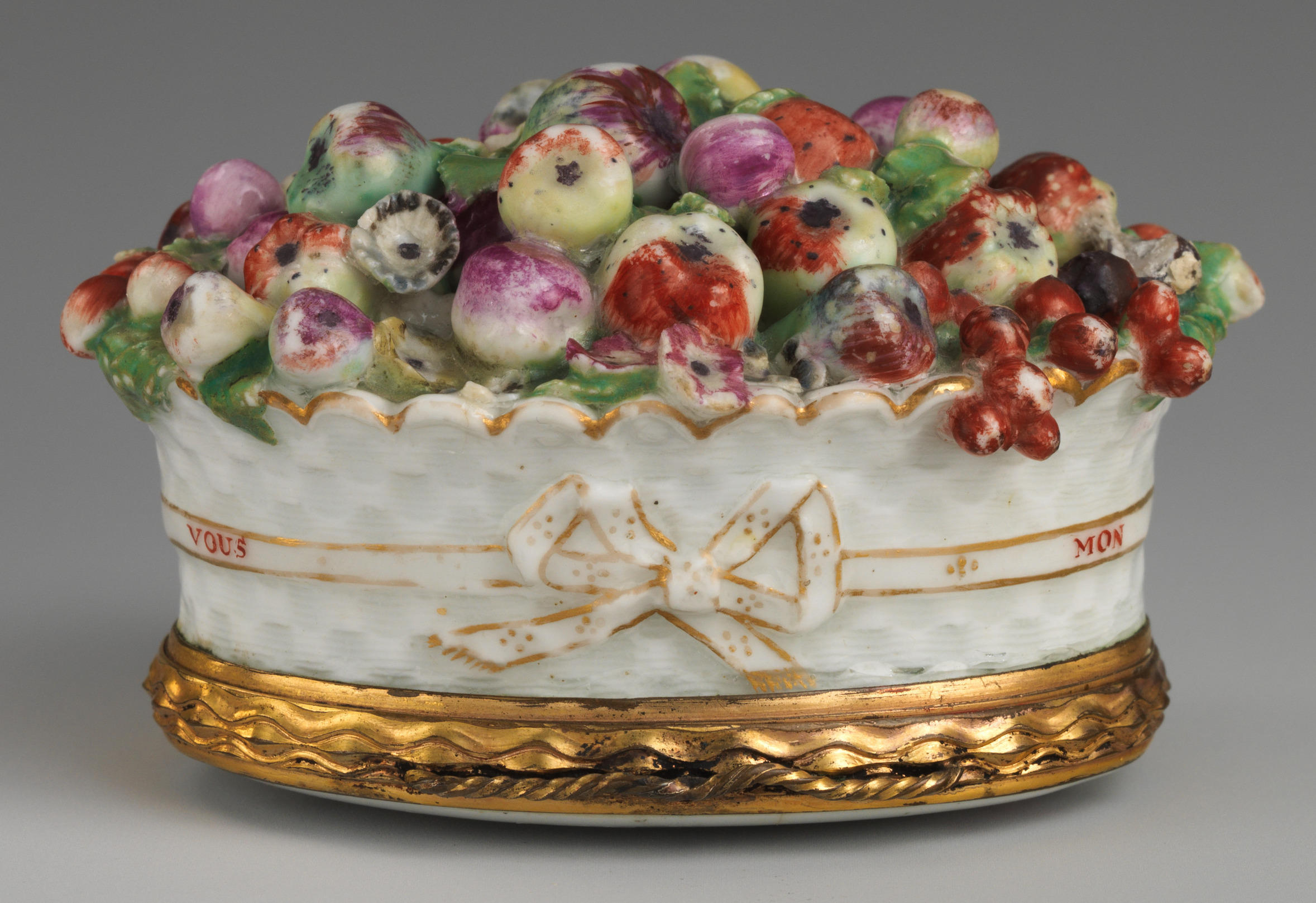
A "Chelsea Toy" in the form of a basket of fruit, width 2 3/4 inches (4.1 × 7 cm), c. 1755, inscribed "MON AMOUR LES A CUEILLI POUR VOUS" ("my love gathered these for you").

As at Meissen and Chantilly some time earlier, imitations of Japanese export porcelain in the Kakiemon style were popular from the late 1740s until around 1758. These were copied both from the Continental imitations and Japanese originals, and some apparently freshly created in the style.

Some tableware was decorated with bold and botanically accurate paintings of plants, known as "botanical" pieces, which essentially take onto porcelain the style of the large botanical book illustrations that were beginning to be produced, and often hand-coloured. The factory was very close to the Chelsea Physic Garden (founded 1673 and still open on the same site), which may have influenced the approach, and at least provided illustrated books as models. Some pieces were copied from various books, including those by Philip Miller, the director of the gardens (the eighth edition of The Gardener's Dictionary (1752) and Figures of Plants, vol 1, 1755) and Georg Dionysius Ehret. An advertisement in 1758 offered "Table Plates, Soup Plates, and Desart Plates enamelled from the Hans Sloane's Plants" (Sloane had set up the garden's current site in 1722).

These innovative pieces exerted a long-lasting influence on porcelain design, especially in Britain, and similar styles have seen a strong revival from the late 20th century, led by Portmeirion Pottery's "Botanic Garden" range, launched in 1972, using designs adapted from Thomas Green's Universal or-Botanical, Medical and Agricultural Dictionary (1817).

The small "Toys", which become prominent in this period, may have been copied from the elusive "Girl-in-a Swing" factory, now usually located at St James's, an even more fashionable location in the West End of London, which was active about 1751–54. This seems to have been connected to the Chelsea factory in some way. Another development was tureens and sometimes other large forms in the shapes of animals, birds or plants.

Examples of fairly exact copying of Meissen wares are the "Monkey Band" (Affenkapelle or "ape orchestra" in German), a group of ten figures of monkey musicians, and a larger excited conductor, all in fancy contemporary costumes. Such singeries were popular in various media.

=== Gold anchor period (1756–1769) ===
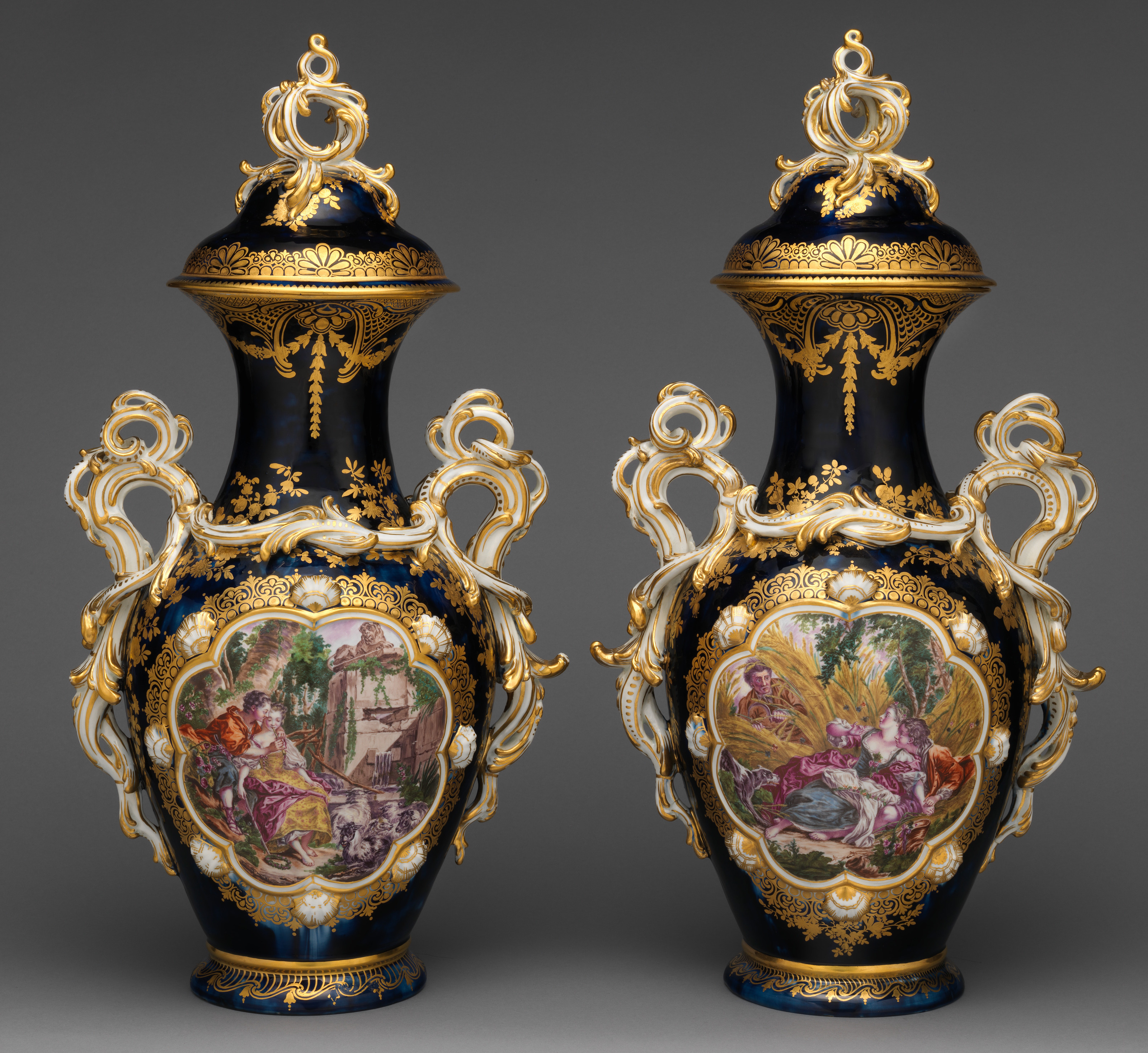
Pair of vases, c. 1762, in a Sèvres style. The main scenes derive from paintings by François Boucher, via prints. Ht: 23 in (58 cm)

The influence of Sèvres was very strong and French taste was in the ascendancy. Although many existing types continued to be produced, the gold anchor period saw rich coloured grounds, lavish gilding and the nervous energy of the Rococo style. As had been the case with imitations of Meissen Kakiemon, Chelsea began to imitate the Sèvres Rococo style just as Sèvres itself was abandoning it for more restrained shapes and decoration. Chelsea garnitures of vases became very large and elaborate, some with as many as seven pieces in diminishing sizes. The body now included bone ash, and a wider range of colours was used, as well as lavish gilding. The glaze now had a tendency to drip and pool, as well as crazing, and had a slight greenish tint.

In 1763, George III and Queen Charlotte sent the queen's brother Adolphus Frederick IV, Duke of Mecklenburg-Strelitz a large Chelsea service. This commissioning of porcelain for diplomatic gifts was common among the ruler-owned European factories (and indeed in East Asia), but novel for England. The service was praised by Horace Walpole, who said it cost £1,200, and is now mostly in the Royal Collection, who have 137 pieces.

East Asian styles had returned in the red anchor period in the form of versions of Japanese Imari ware, but are more common with the gold anchor. These were to remain an English favourite, especially associated with later Crown Derby, and versions are still made today. According to at least one English authority the first Chelsea versions "greatly surpass in beauty their dull originals".

Evidence suggests that production was low from 1763, perhaps because Sprimont wished to retire. A sale in 1763 included at least some moulds and premises, as well as household furniture of Sprimont. No dedicated sale was then held until 1769, when moulds were offered again.

In August 1769, the factory was sold by Sprimont, whose health had been bad, and the next year it was purchased by William Duesbury of Derby porcelain who ran it until 1784; Sprimont sold the factory in August 1769 to a James Cox. Duesbury and his partner John Heath bought it in February 1770. The factory continued to operate in Chelsea but during this time the Chelsea wares are indistinguishable from Duesbury's Derby wares and the period is usually termed "Chelsea-Derby". A final Chelsea sale (at Christie's) began on 14 February 1770.

== Management and artists ==
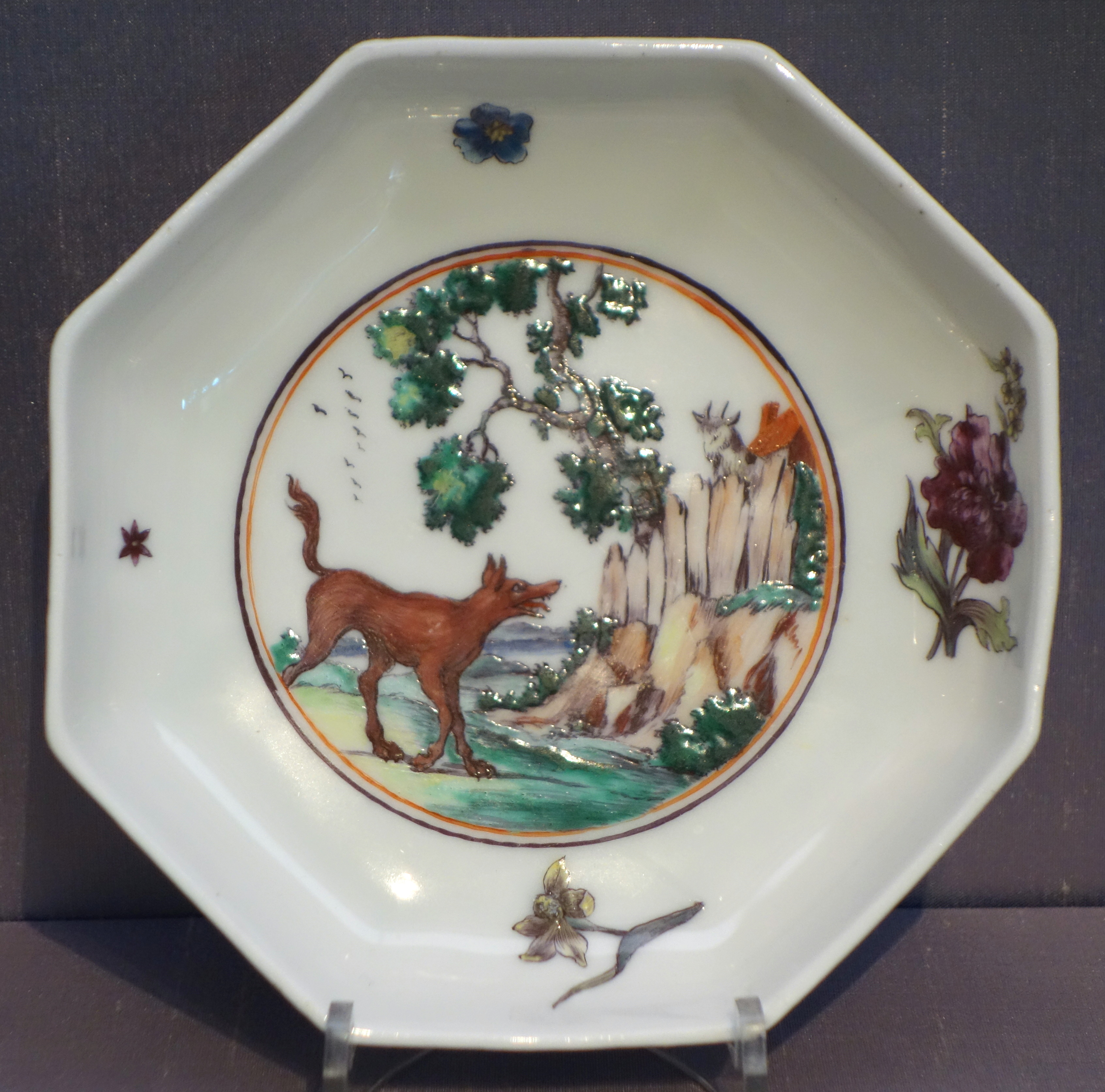
Saucer with fable by the "Chelsea Fable Painter", perhaps Jefferyes Hamett O'Neale, c. 1752

The silversmith Nicholas Sprimont (1716–1771), who came from Liège in modern Belgium, was the usual public face of the factory, but there were other main figures, and the precise roles of all of them are uncertain. Charles Gouyn or Gouyon (before 1737–1782) was another London Huguenot silversmith, and also a dealer in porcelain, who was involved in the early years, but whose role is obscure. He has been suggested as being "concerned with the technical part of the manufacture", or as providing the finance, and acting as a major buyer or distributor of wares. By 1749 or 1750 there may have been a rift between the two. Gouyn may have founded the "Girl-in-a-Swing" factory or St James's factory, named after the fashionable street where he had a shop.

Any porcelain factory needed an "arcanist", or chemist who could devise the formulae for the body paste, glaze, and colours, and specify the firing variables. It is not clear who this was at Chelsea; a paper in the British Museum believed to be by Sprimont speaks of having "a casual acquaintance with a chymist who had some knowledge that way", who influenced him to start the factory. Gouyn is one suggestion; another is a Thomas Bryand or Briand, who in 1743 showed the Royal Society examples of porcelain. By 1746 he was living in Staffordshire, establishing a business partnership, self-described as a painter who "had found out ye art of making an Earthenware Little inferior to Porcelain or China Ware"; but he seems to have died the following year.

Large payments to the factory are recorded in 1746 to 1748 from Sir Everard Fawkener, secretary to the king's third son, Prince William, Duke of Cumberland, who had put down the Jacobite rising of 1745. It is not clear if these were on behalf of the prince or from Fawkener's own funds, or the exact nature of what seems to have been a financing operation. Whereas royal investment in porcelain manufacturing was very common in Europe, it would have been unprecedented in England. A five inch high portrait head of the prince was produced, which was an unusual departure from Chelsea's normal wares. In 1751 a letter says that Fawkener borrowed some Meissen pieces to be copied in Chelsea, and was described as "concerned in the manufacture of China at Chelsea", while the same writer adds "I find that the Duke is a great encourager of the Chelsea China". A worker at the factory believed that Fawkener and Cumberland were the first owners, who employed Sprimont at a guinea a day. Fawkener died in 1758, in some financial difficulties, and at this point Sprimont may have finally become the full owner.

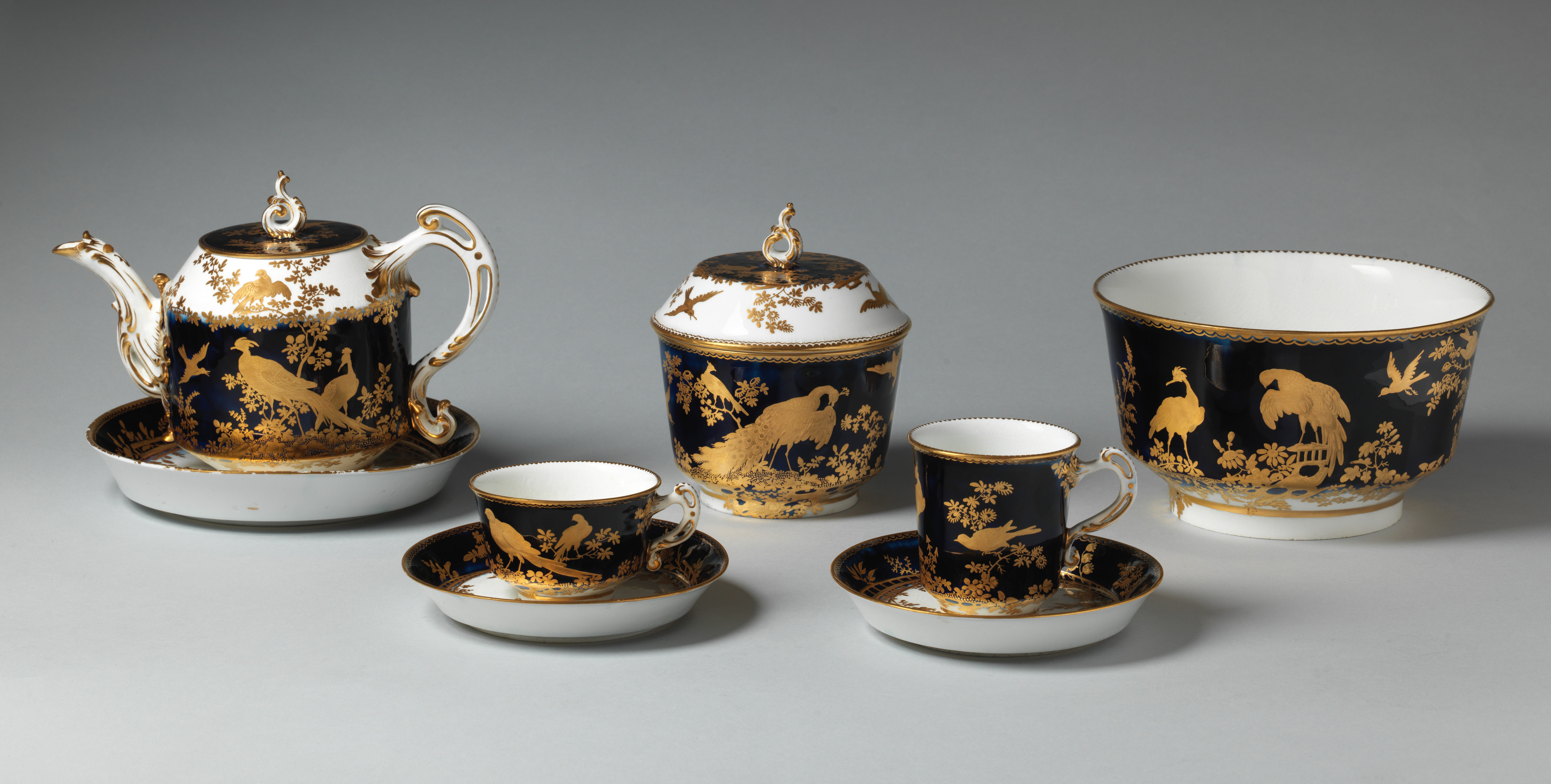
Part of a gold anchor tea service, c. 1758–59. The black and gold palette imitates Asian lacquer.

Sprimont is generally regarded as the guiding hand of the tableware shapes, which made heavy use of metal precedents. Few of the many artists involved are known. The main modeller of figures was the Flemish sculptor Joseph Willems, at Chelsea from about 1749 to 1766, when he left for the factory at Tournai. The miniature painter Jefferyes Hamett O'Neale has been identified as the "Chelsea Fable Painter", though not without objections; he later signed pieces of Worcester porcelain, though probably working in London. W.B. Honey felt the signed Worcester pieces were too crude to be by the hand of the "Chelsea Fable Painter", though more recent writers accept the identification.

The leading sculptor Louis-François Roubiliac, French but working in London, was long believed to have modelled many figures, which were additionally marked with an impressed "R", but it seems that this mark means something else, and it is likely that there were at most only a handful of instances of models by him. Sprimont was the godfather of one of his daughters. One Chelsea figure certainly based on his work is the reclining portrait of the painter William Hogarth's pug dog called Trump. Roubiliac sculpted Trump in terracotta in about 1741, to accompany a bust of Hogarth. The figure appeared in Chelsea porcelain some years later, and then in Josiah Wedgwood's Black Basalt ware after he bought a cast of the terracotta in 1774. A portrait bust of Frederick, Prince of Wales also appears close to Roubiliac's style.

William Duesbury, who bought the factory in 1770, had been a painter of Chelsea and other wares at his own London workshop, which is documented by an account book of his covering 1751 to 1753 which has survived. However, no Chelsea pieces by his workshop can be securely identified. The books record many figures of birds in particular.

== Markets and collectors ==
Much of the distribution of Chelsea and other English porcelain (and fine earthenware such as Wedgwood) was through the "chinamen", already a recognised category of dealers and retailers for porcelain, and "warehouses" in Central London, which sold mainly to smaller dealers and shop-keepers, often from the provinces, but also to customers. Chelsea's arrangements are less well documented than those of Bow, but Gouyn's shop in St James was probably an outlet, at least in the early period. The annual actions were partly intended for the chinamen, with some lots made up of a range of wares to provide a stock. The East India Company had been selling its cargos of East Asian porcelain at auction for some decades. Chelsea wares reached British America, but there were probably few exports to the Continent.

Early English porcelain was soon being collected, especially in the late 19th century, when prices rose steadily. Over the 20th century there has been a great reversal in collectors' interests, with wares from later in the century far cheaper now (allowing for inflation) than they were a century ago, while the rare earliest pieces have seen dizzying increases in value. The sale at auction in 2003 of a tureen in the form of a hen and chickens for £223,650 was then the auction record for English 18th-century porcelain. In 2018 a pair of plaice-shaped tureens of c. 1755 from the collection of David Rockefeller and his wife fetched $300,000 (both sales at Christie's).

== Gallery ==
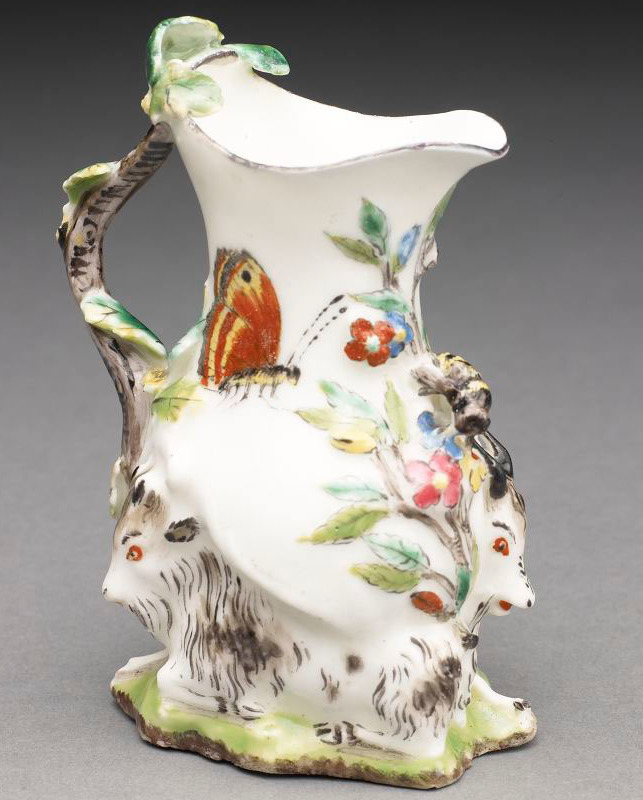
Goat-and-Bee Jug, c. 1745–1749, Birmingham Museum of Art

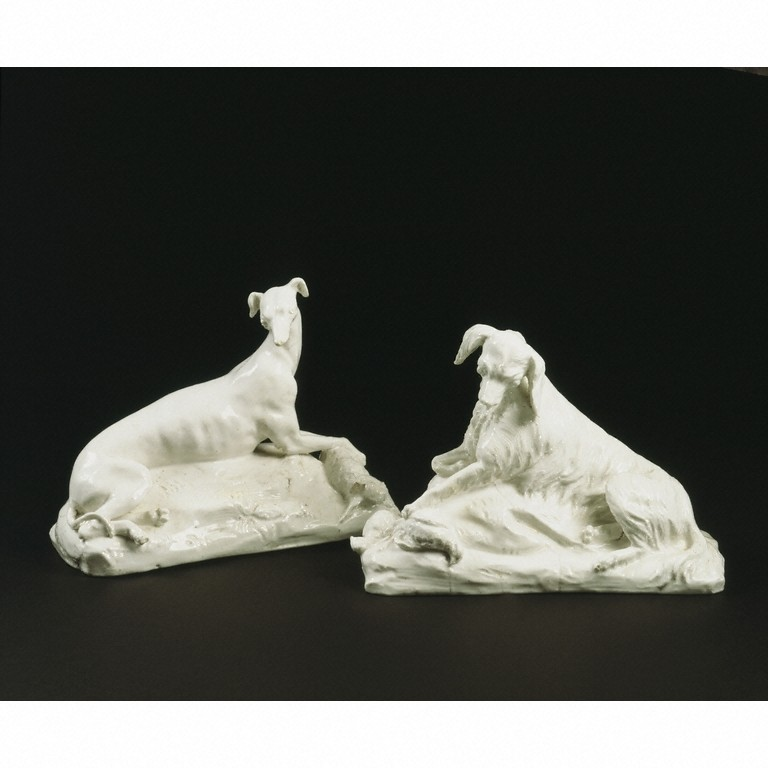
Pair of dogs, about 1749, height 13.4 centimetres (5.3 in), V&A Museum

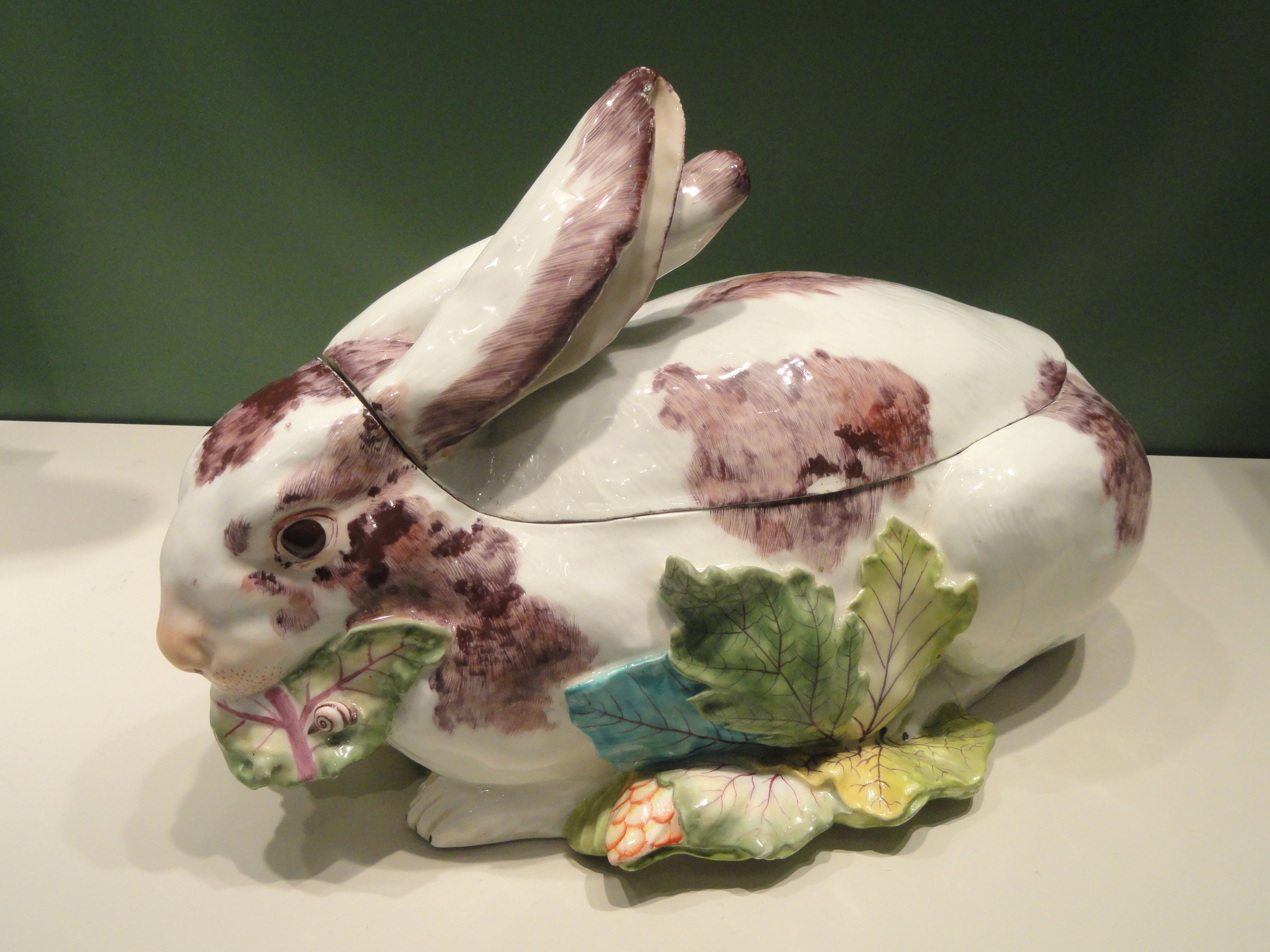
Rabbit tureen, 1752–1756

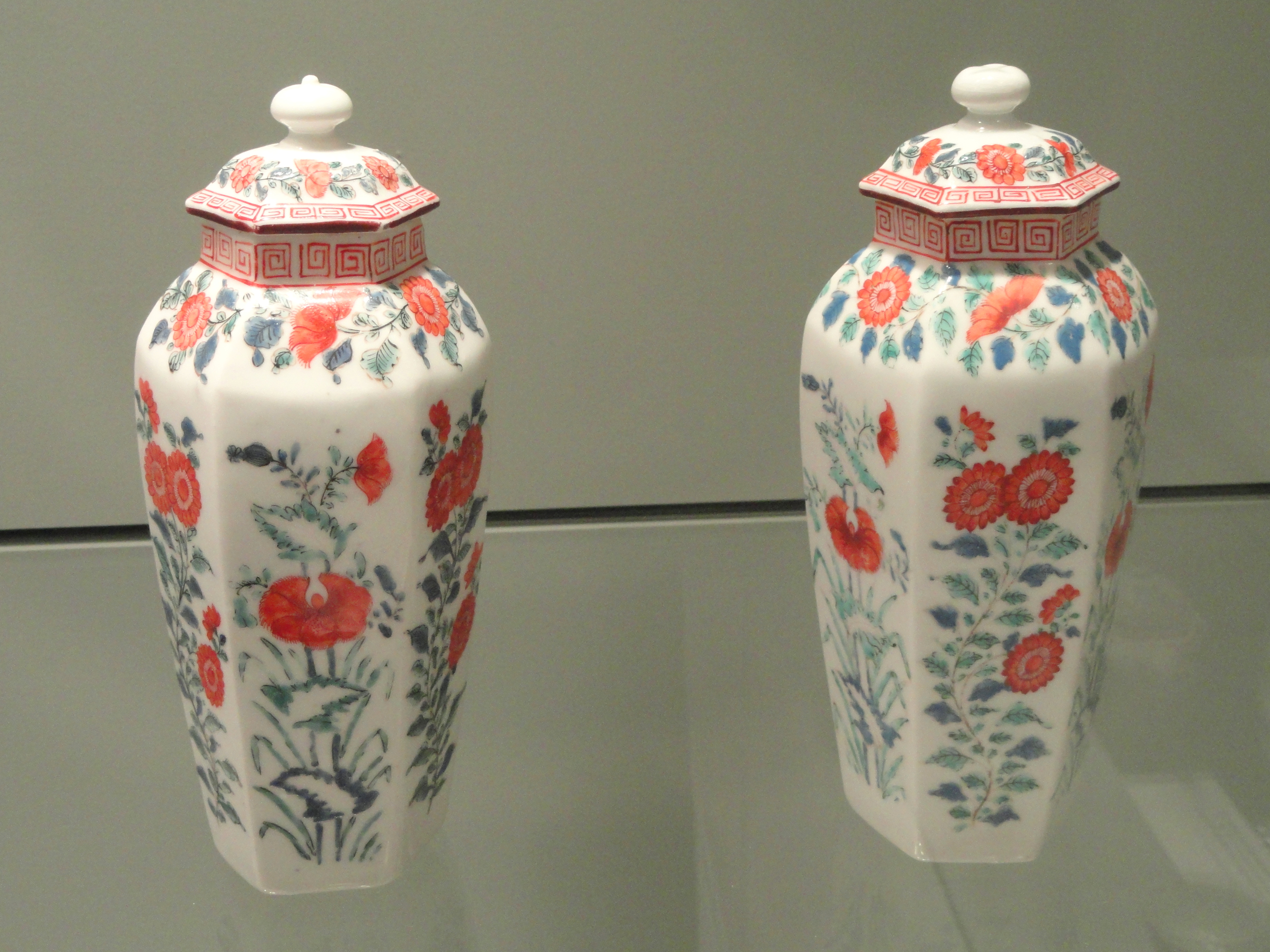
Pair of Hexagonal Vases in Kakiemon style, c. 1752–1755, Gardiner Museum, Toronto

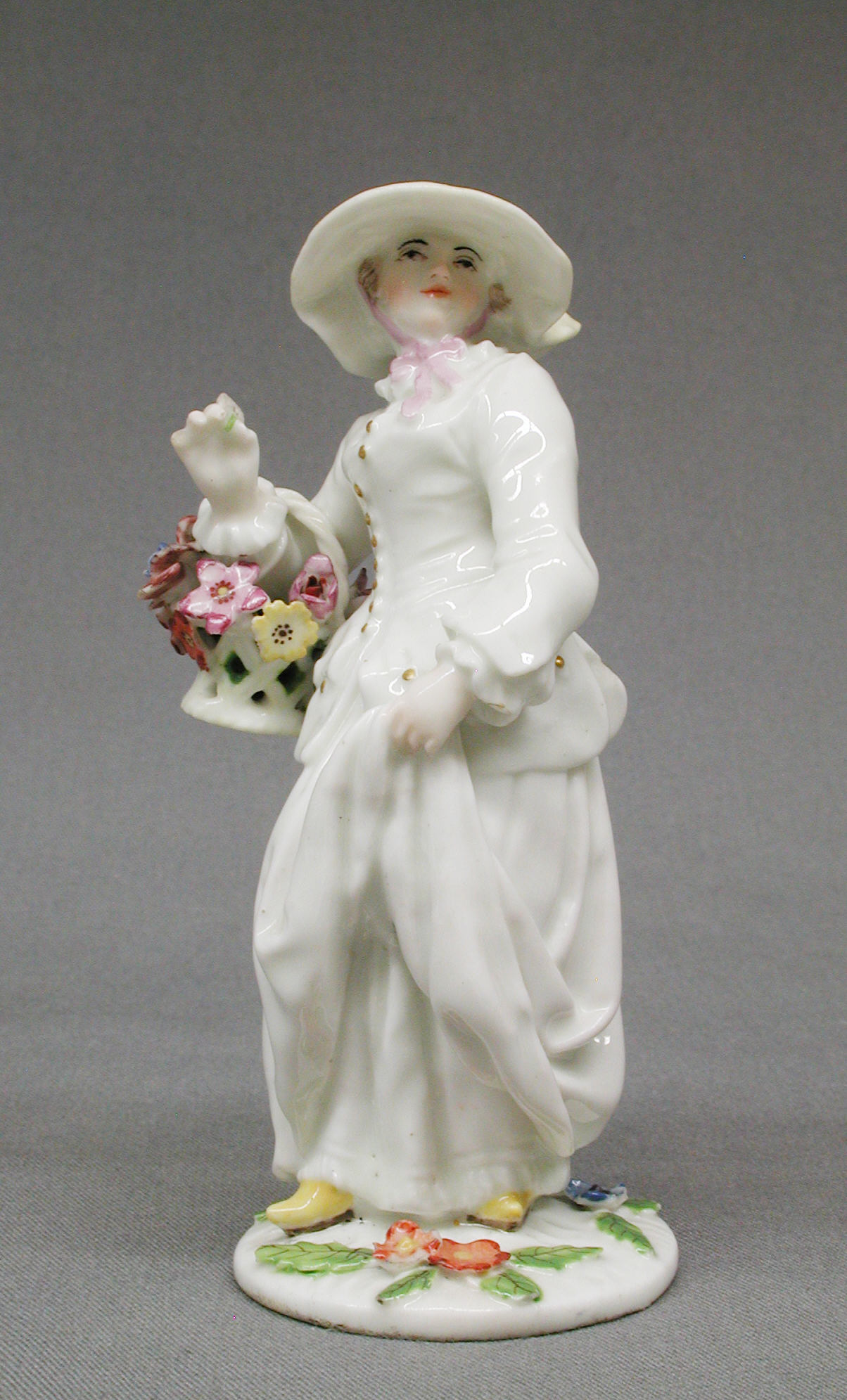
"Spring" from a set of the Four Seasons, 1753–1755, 5 1/4 inches (13 cm) high

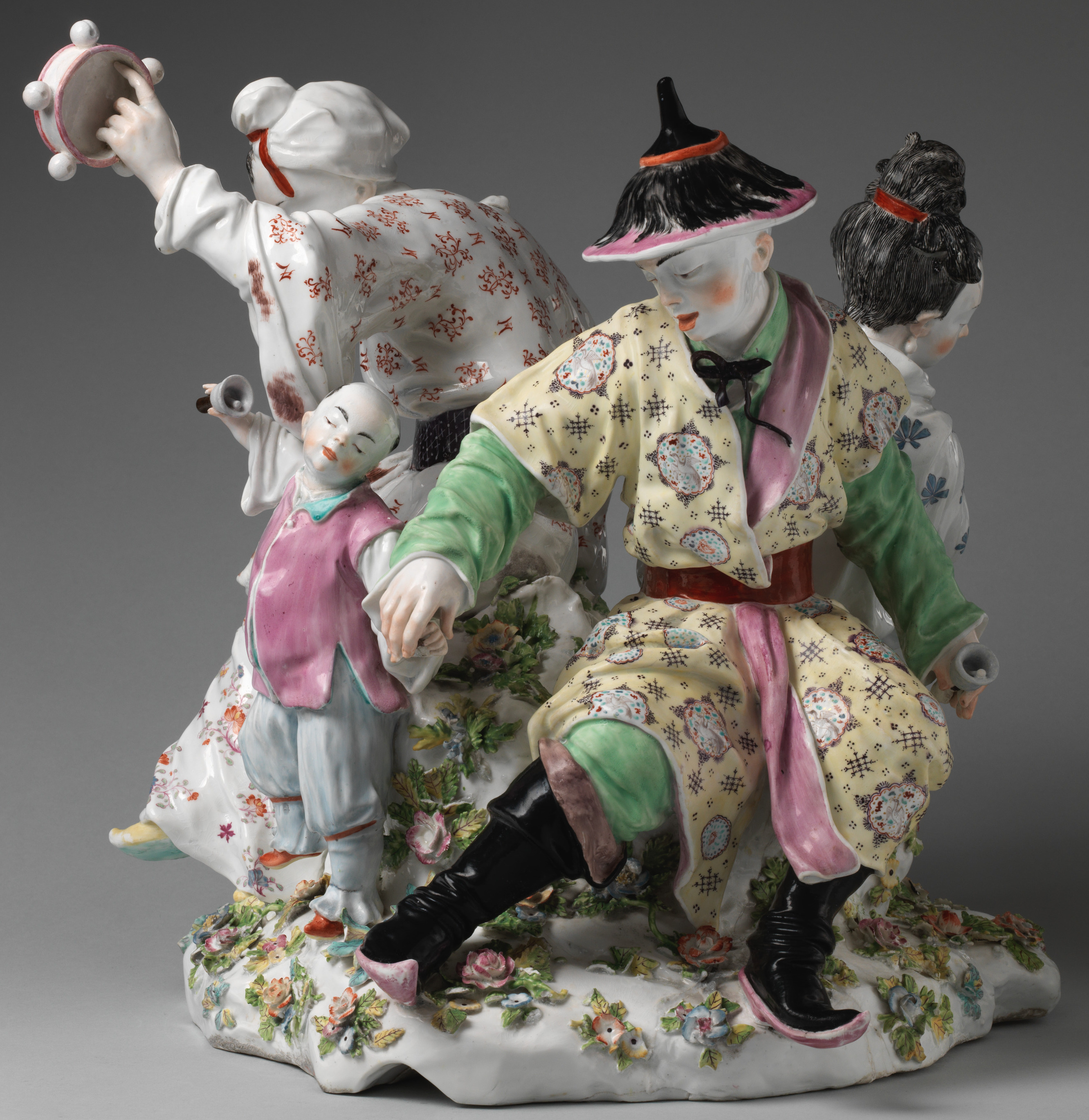
Group of Chinese musicians, red anchor, c. 1755, height: 14 1/2 inches (37 cm), weight: 30.2 pounds (13.7 kg)

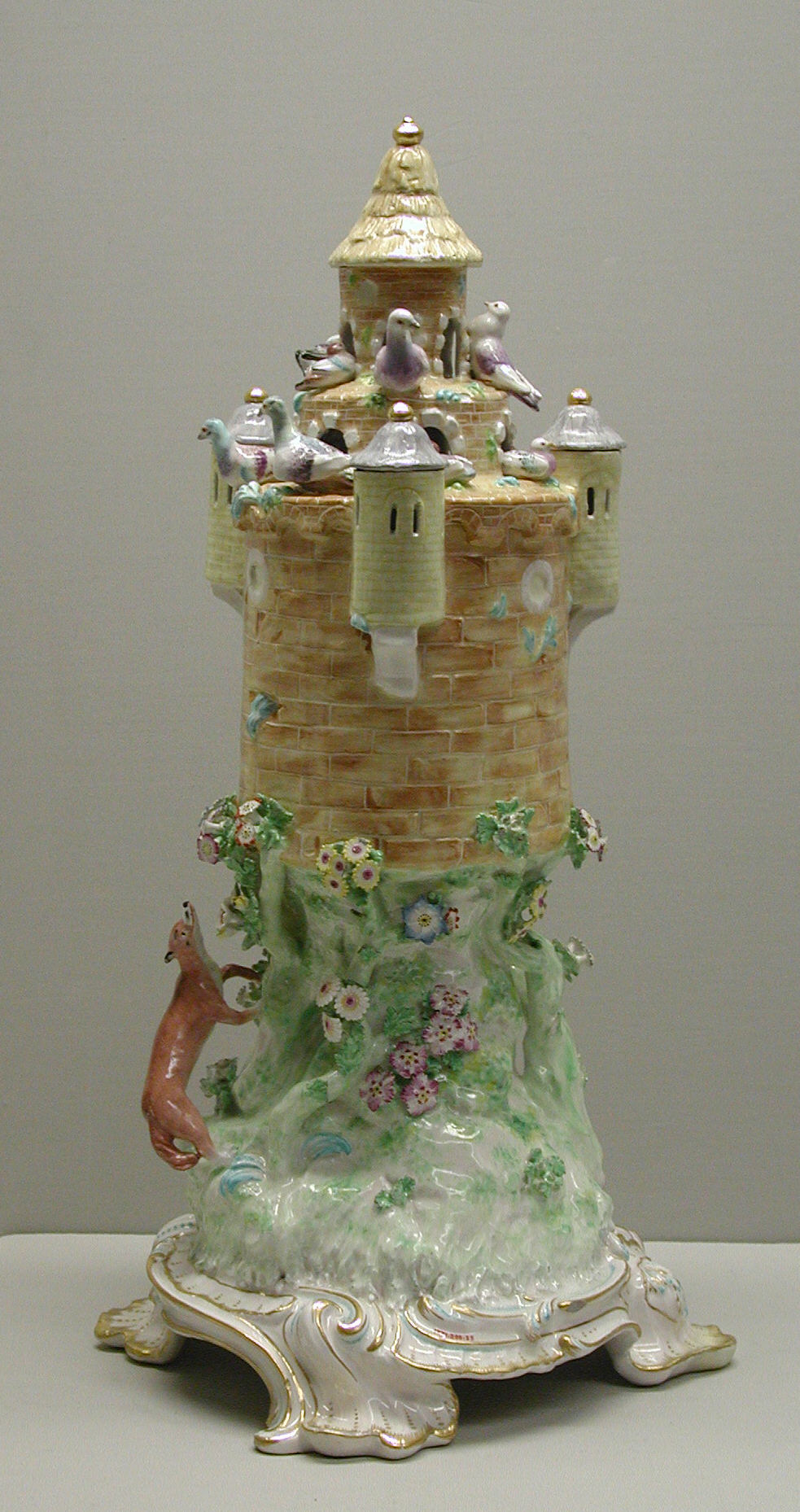
Perfume burner in the form of a dove-cote with prowling fox, c. 1759–1765, 51 centimetres (20 in) high

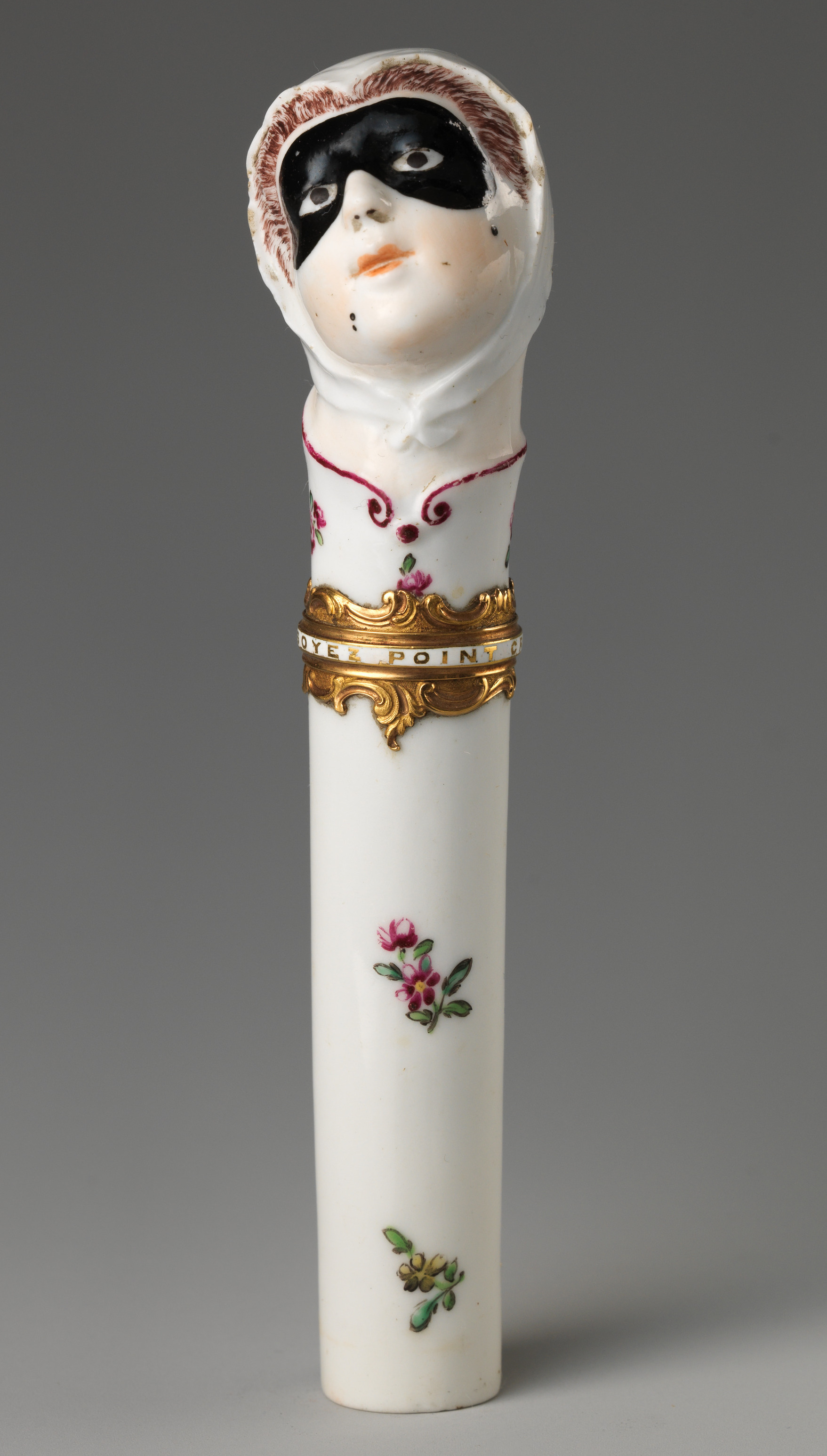
"Toy" needlecase with the head of Columbina, c. 1760, height: 4 7/8 inches (12 cm). Inscribed on enamel band on mount: NE SOYEZ POINT CRUELE ("Don't be so cruel")

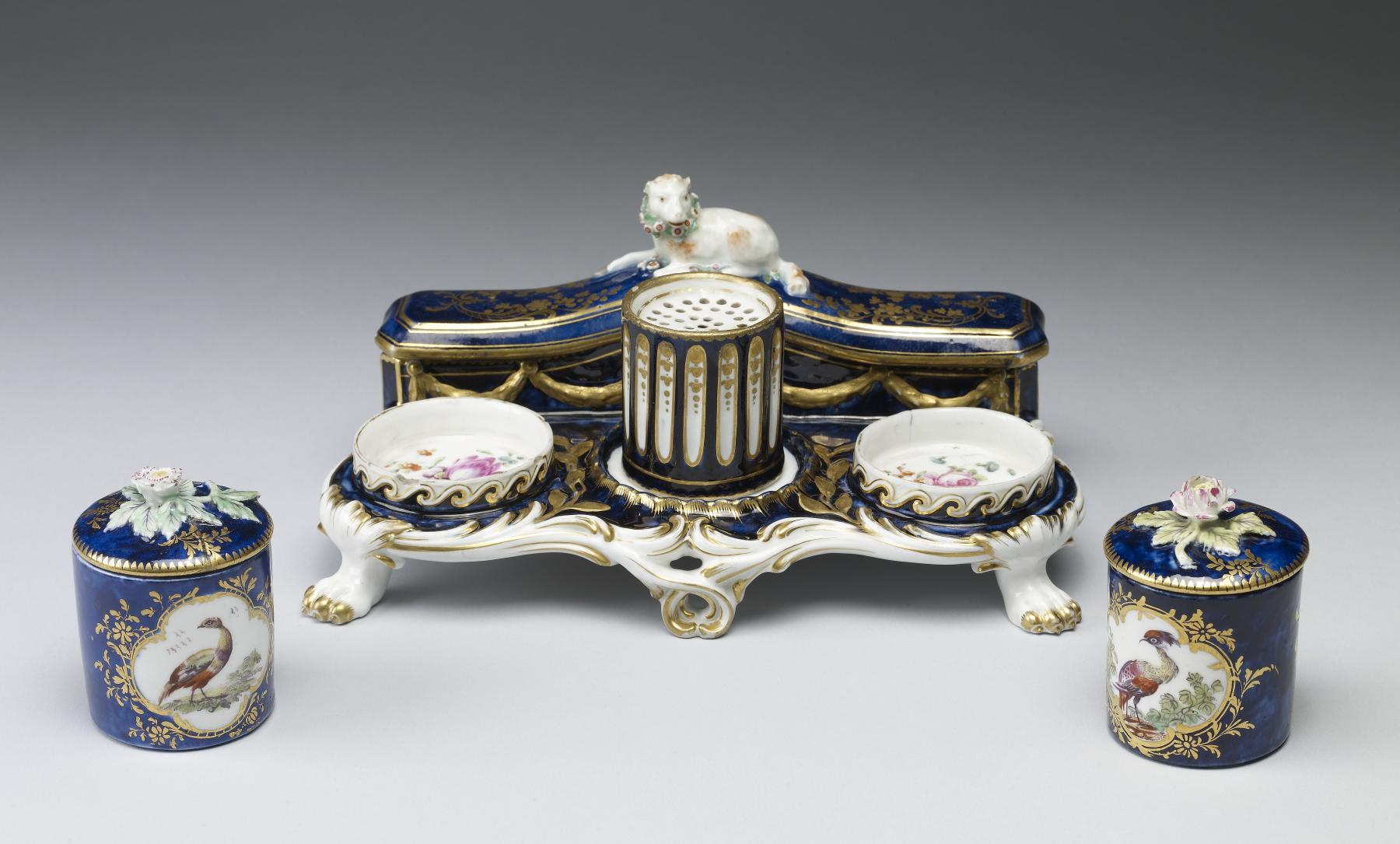
Porcelain inkstand set, 1759–1769. The style and the "mazarine blue" ground are borrowed from Sèvres. The Walters Art Museum.

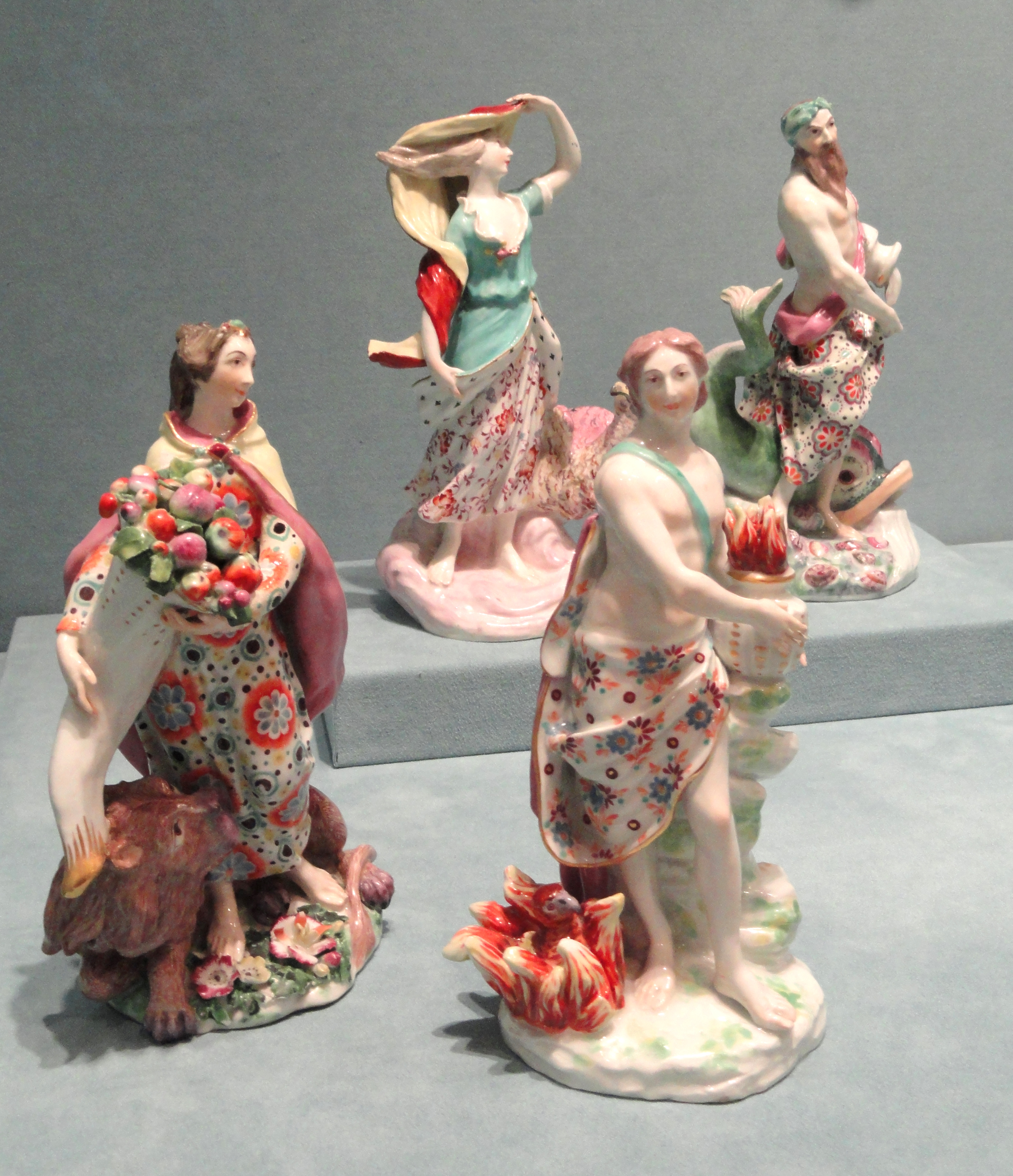
The Four Elements set, 1760s
