= Esme Francis =

Cornish songwriter and harpist

- Born: Cornwall

Esme Francis is a Cornish language songwriter, composer, lyricist, music teacher, and harpist who has contributed significantly to the traditional music of Cornwall.

== Biography ==
Francis is a songwriter in the Cornish language. One of her collections includes the song "Black and Gold". In 1978, Francis was made a Bard of Gorsedh Kernow, taking the bardic name Ylyades or Ylades (Songwriter). She has served as harpist for Gorsedh Kernow for over 40 years. She retired in 2019.

In 2006 she was nominated in the Gorsedd Competition for her book Seny: Cornish Celtic Songs. In 2014, she was nominated by the Holyer an Gof Publishers' Awards for her work Trewarveneth. She received the Awen Award for her services to Cornish music in 2016.

Francis lives in St Just.

== Works ==
=== Non-fiction ===
- 1998 – Kan: Cornish Celtic song
- 1999 – Rakka: Cornish Celtic song

=== Scores ===
- 2005 – Seny: Cornish Celtic Songs
- 2008 – Where Seagulls Cry: six classical songs for soprano
- 2009 – Where the Lark Rises: six classical songs for tenor
- 2010 – Trelawny: Celtic Cornwall in Song
- 2011 – Summer nights : six classical songs for mezzo-soprano/contralto
- 2013 – Trewarveneth: six classical songs for baritone and bass
- 2013 – Keltek Kan: Cornish Celtic Song
- 2017 – Land's End Suite: for harp

=== Fiction ===
- 2007 – Southwest by Southwest
- 2015 – Rialobran: a play

== Discography ==
- 2004 – Kernow: Cornish Song
- 2004 – Keltek: Cornish Music
