= Bocage =

Terrain of mixed woodland and pasture

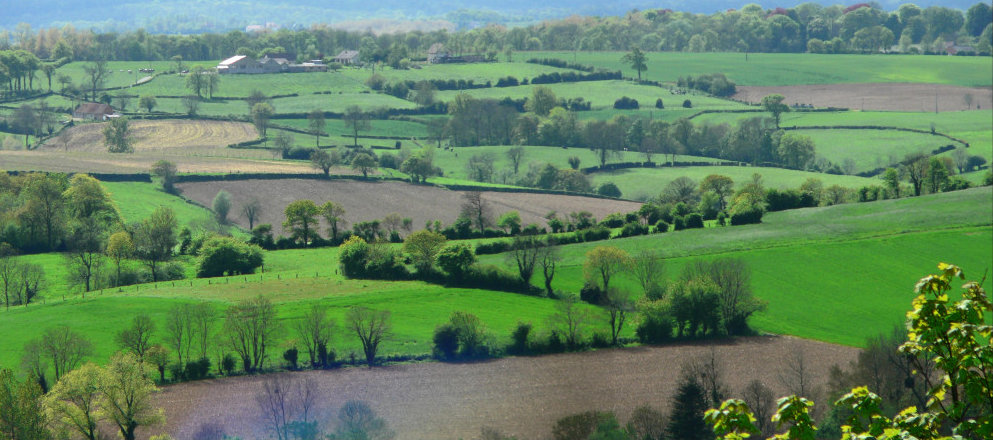
Bocage near Boulogne-sur-Mer, France

Bocage (UK: /bəˈkɑːʒ/, US: /ˈboʊkɑːʒ/ BOH-kahzh) is a terrain of mixed woodland and pasture characteristic of parts of northern France, southern England, Ireland, the Netherlands, Portugal (examples in Baixo Vouga Lagunar, Angeja, Estarreja), northern Spain and northern Germany, in regions where pastoral farming is the dominant land use.

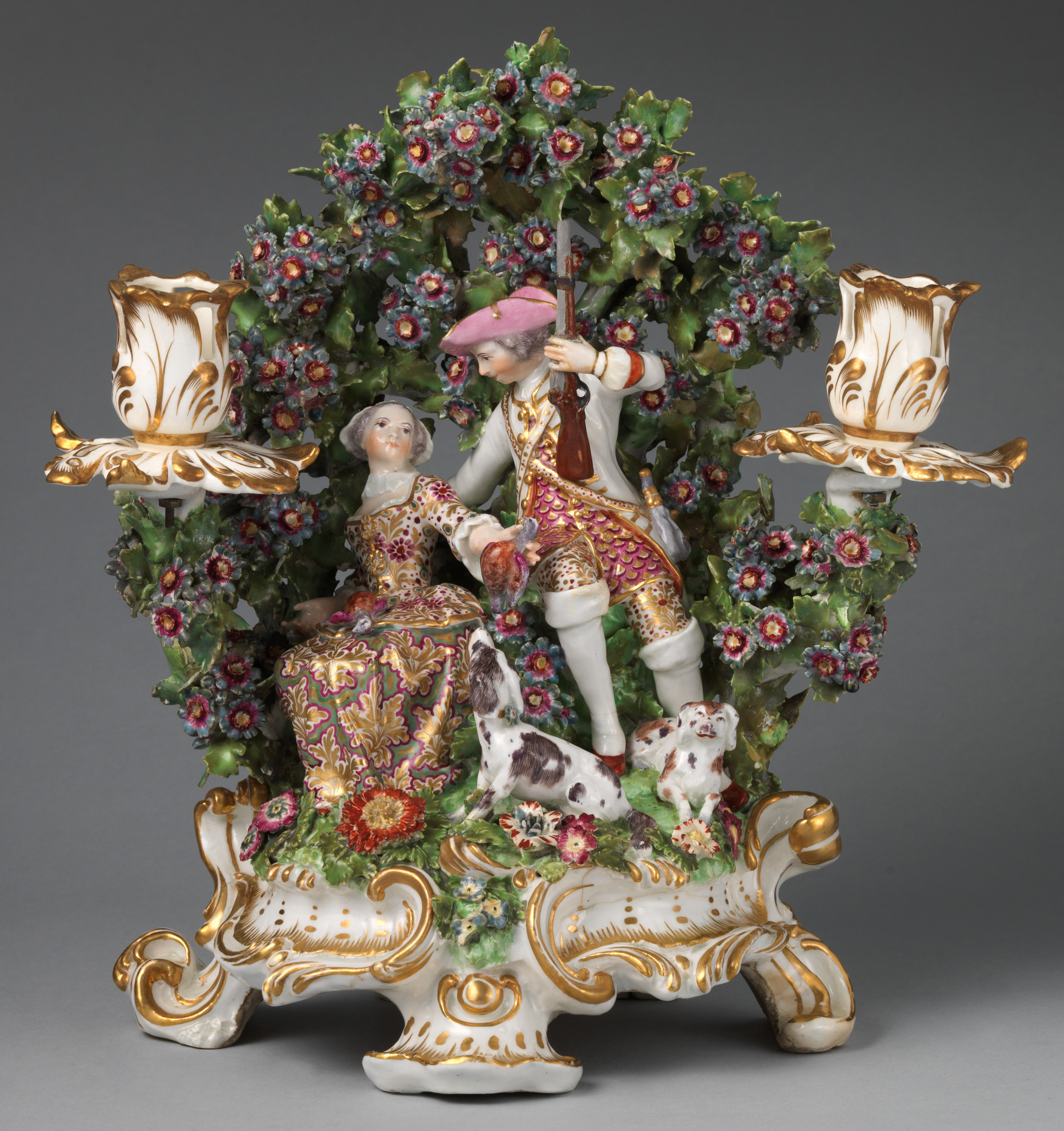
Chelsea porcelain factory candle-holder with bocage background, c. 1765

Bocage may also refer to a small forest, a decorative element of leaves, or a type of rubble-work, comparable with the English use of "rustic" in relation to garden ornamentation. In the decorative arts, especially porcelain, it refers to a leafy screen spreading above and behind figures. Though found on continental figures, it is something of an English speciality, beginning in the mid-18th century, especially in Chelsea porcelain, and later spreading to more downmarket Staffordshire pottery figures.

In English, bocage refers to a terrain of mixed woodland and pasture, with fields and winding country lanes sunken between narrow low ridges and banks surmounted by tall thick hedgerows that break the wind but also limit visibility. It is the sort of landscape found in many parts of southern England, for example the Devon hedge and Cornish hedge. However the term is more often found in technical than general usage in England. In France the term is in more general use, especially in Normandy, with a similar meaning. Bocage landscape in France is largely confined to Normandy, Brittany, Burgundy and parts of the Loire valley.

== Etymology ==
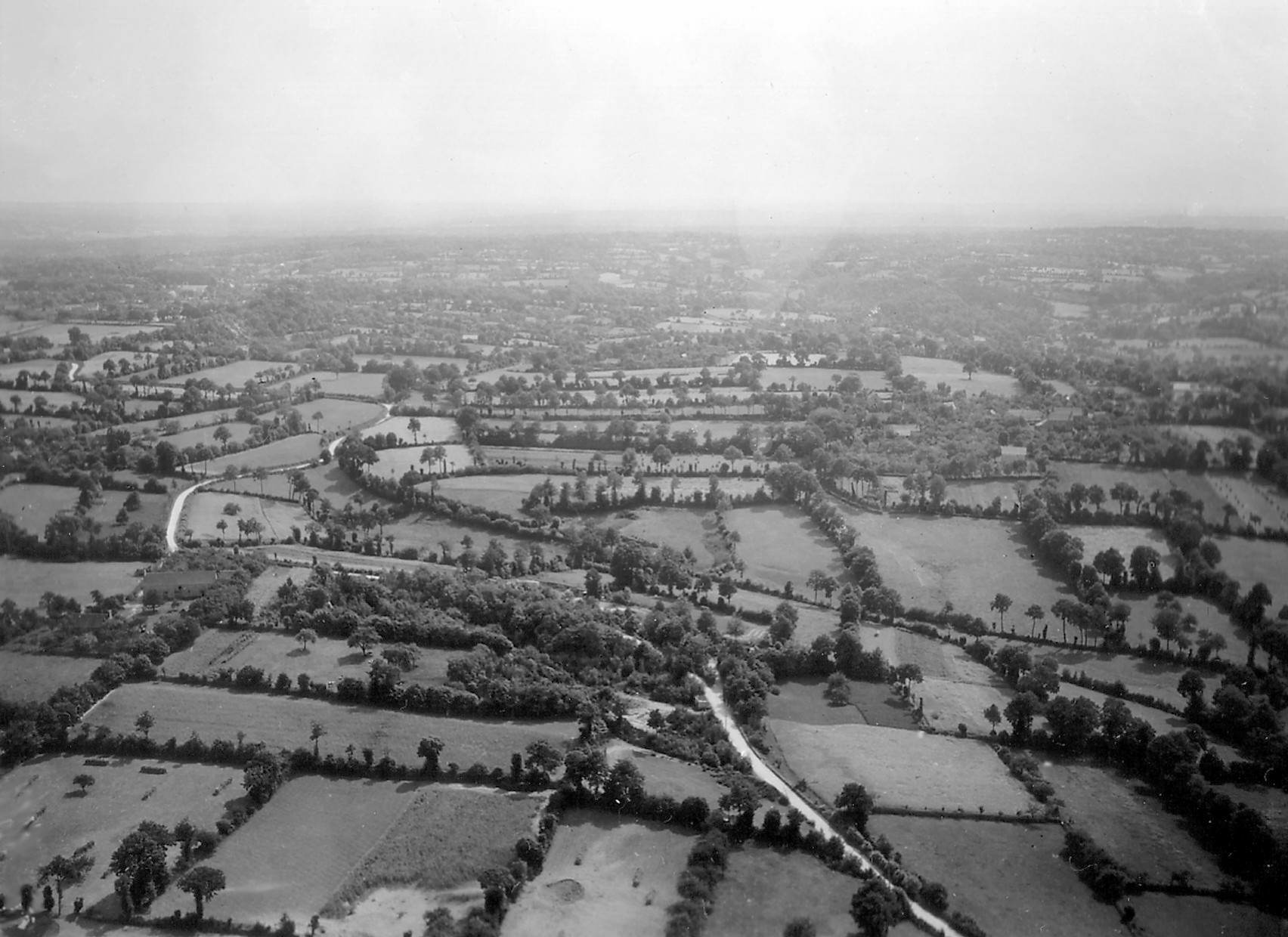
Bocage country on the Cotentin Peninsula, Lower Normandy, in 1944

Bocage is a Norman word that comes from the Old Norman boscage (Anglo-Norman boscage, Old French boschage), from the Old French root bosc ("wood") > Modern French bois ("wood") cf. Medieval Latin boscus (first mentioned in 704 CE). The Norman place names retain it as Bosc-, -bosc, Bosc-, pronounced traditionally [bɔk] or [bo]. The suffix -age means "a general thing". The boscage form was used in English for "growing trees or shrubs; a thicket, grove; woody undergrowth" and to refer to decorative design imitating branches and foliage or leafy decoration such as is found on eighteenth-century porcelain; since early twentieth century this usually called "bocage". Similar words occur in Scandinavian (cf. Swedish buskage; Danish buskads) and other Germanic languages (cf. Dutch bos, boshaag); the original root is thought to be the Proto-Germanic *bŏsk-. The boscage form seems to have developed its meaning under the influence of eighteenth-century romanticism.

The 1934 Nouveau Petit Larousse defined bocage as "a bosquet, a little wood, an agreeably shady wood" and a bosquet as "a little wood, a clump of trees". By 2006, the Petit Larousse definition had become "(Norman word) Region where the fields and meadows are enclosed by earth banks carrying hedges or rows of trees and where the habitation is generally dispersed in farms and hamlets."

== Historic role ==
=== England ===
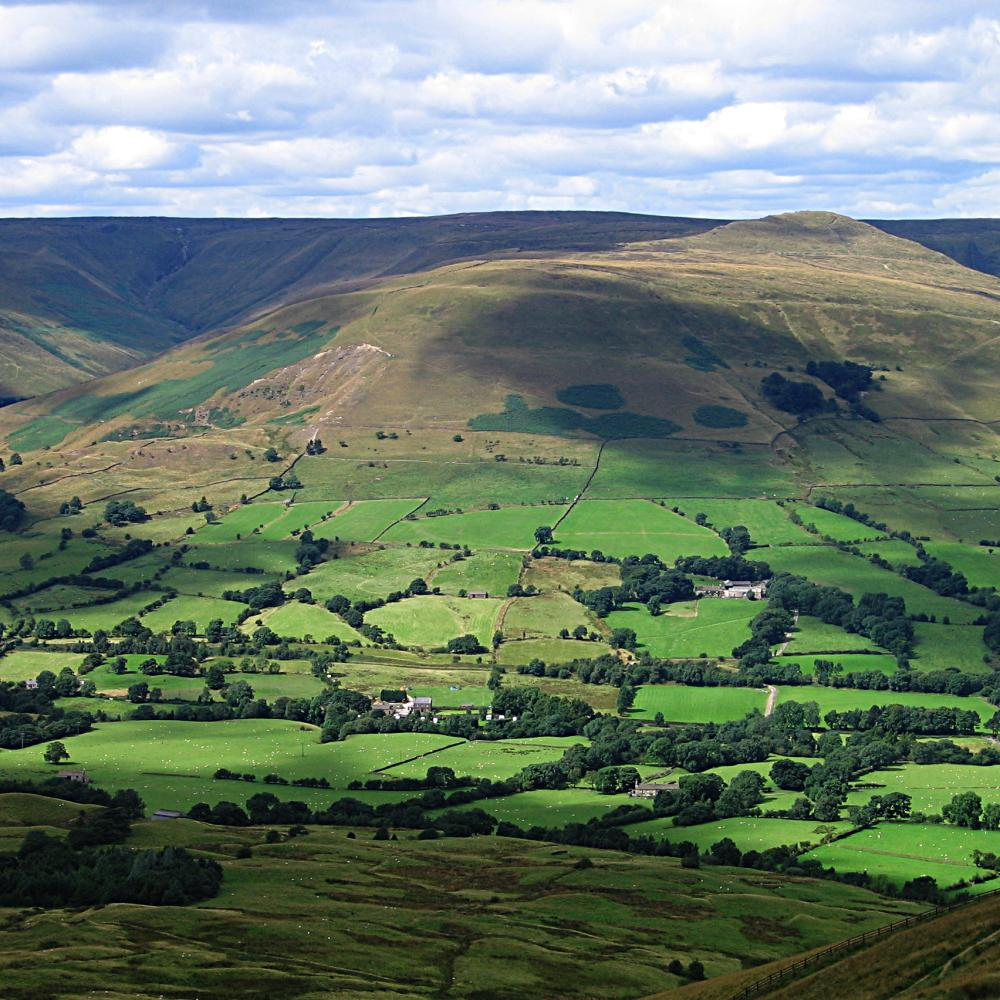
English bocage (Edale valley, Peak District)

In southeast England, in spite of a sedimentary soil which would not fit this landscape, a bocage resulted from the movement to enclose what were once open fields.

During the 17th century, England developed an ambitious sea policy. One of the effects of this was the importation of Russian wheat, which was cheaper than English wheat at that time. The enclosures common in the bocage countryside favoured sheep husbandry and limited English cereal grain production, and as a consequence of this policy, the rural exodus was amplified, accelerating the Industrial Revolution. The surplus of agricultural workers migrated to the cities to work in factories.

=== Normandy ===
In Normandy, the bocage acquired a particular significance in the Chouannerie during the French Revolution.

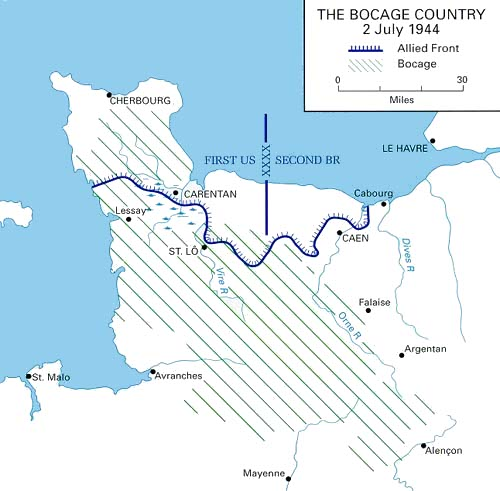
Location of bocage in the context of Operation Overlord

The bocage was also significant during the Battle of Normandy in World War II, as it made progress against the German defenders difficult. Plots of land were divided by ancient rows of dirt alongside drainage ditches; thick vegetation on these dirt mounds could create barriers up to 16 feet (4.9 m) high. A typical square mile on the battlefield might contain hundreds of irregular hedged enclosures. In response, "Rhino tanks" fitted with bocage-cutting modifications were developed. American personnel usually referred to bocages as hedgerows. The German army also used sunken lanes to implement strong points and defences to stop the American troops on the Cotentin Peninsula and around the town of Saint-Lô.

=== Ireland ===
Almost all of lowland Ireland is characterised by bocage landscape, a consequence of pastoral farming which requires enclosure for the management of herds. Approximately 5% of Ireland's land area is devoted to hedges, field walls and shelterbelts. In the more fertile areas these usually consist of earthen banks, which are planted with or colonised by trees and shrubs; this vegetation can give the impression of a wooded landscape, even where there is little or no woodland. This pattern of hedgerows was largely established in the late 18th and 19th centuries, a period when Ireland was virtually devoid of natural woodland. Modern intensive agriculture has tended to increase field size by removing hedgerows, a trend which for years was promoted by the Common Agricultural Policy of the European Union and recently has been countered by the European Union's agricultural policies favouring the conservation of wildlife habitats.

== Sources ==
- Oxford English Dictionary
- Nouveau Petit Larousse Illustré (1934)
- Petit Larousse Illustré 2007 (2006)
