= Black and Gold (Cornish song) =

Cornish folk song

Black and Gold (Cornish: Du ha'n Owr) is a Cornish folk song.

Black and gold are the Cornish colours, and can be found on the banner and coat of arms of the Duchy of Cornwall. Traditionally furse (gorse) used to be the major form of fuel in Cornwall, and was widely employed for domestic use. Places mentioned within the song are all located around the village of Boscastle in Cornwall. These include Trevalga, a small village situated between Tintagel and Boscastle. The Cornish phrase "Kissing's out of fashion when the furse is out of bloom" is a local version of the old country phrase: "When gorse is out of blossom, kissing's out of fashion." This is a reference to the fact that gorse bears flowers year round. A version of the song is on Esme Francis' Cornish songs collection Kernow.

English lyrics have been written by Will Coleman.
