= Cornish hedge =

Style of hedge found in Cornwall, England

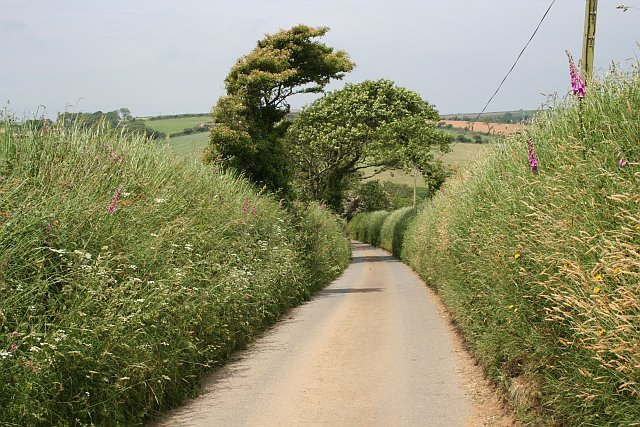
Country lane in St Newlyn East

A Cornish hedge is an ancient style of hedge built of stone and earth found in Cornwall, southwest England. Sometimes hedging plants or trees are planted on the hedge to increase its windbreaking height. A rich flora develops over the lifespan of a Cornish hedge. Cornish hedges contributes to the distinctive field-pattern of the Cornish landscape, and form the county's largest semi-natural wildlife habitat.

== Construction ==
A Cornish hedge has two sides which are built by placing huge stone blocks into the earth and packing them in with sub-soil. Smaller interlocking rocks are used to build the hedge high until it reaches a level when random turns into neat rows of square stones called "edgers". Two inches of grass are sliced from the ground and stuck on top of the structure with sticks. — Article in The West Briton

The hedge is slightly wider at bottom than at the top, because of the large "grounder" stones at the base. The structure is very stable and will stand for a hundred years or more. The hedge has two stone faces with soil between the two walls. Bushes such as gorse may grow on the top, rooted in the soil between the walls. It is called a hedge because of its living component. A professional hedger can build about a metre of double-sided hedge in a day.

The archaeologist Francis Pryor observes:

A visitor to Devon and Cornwall cannot fail to be impressed by the massive hedgebanks that so often confine the road into something approaching a ravine or tunnel. The hedgebanks of Devon are sometimes thicker and more massive than those of Cornwall, which are often remarkably thin and tall.

== History ==
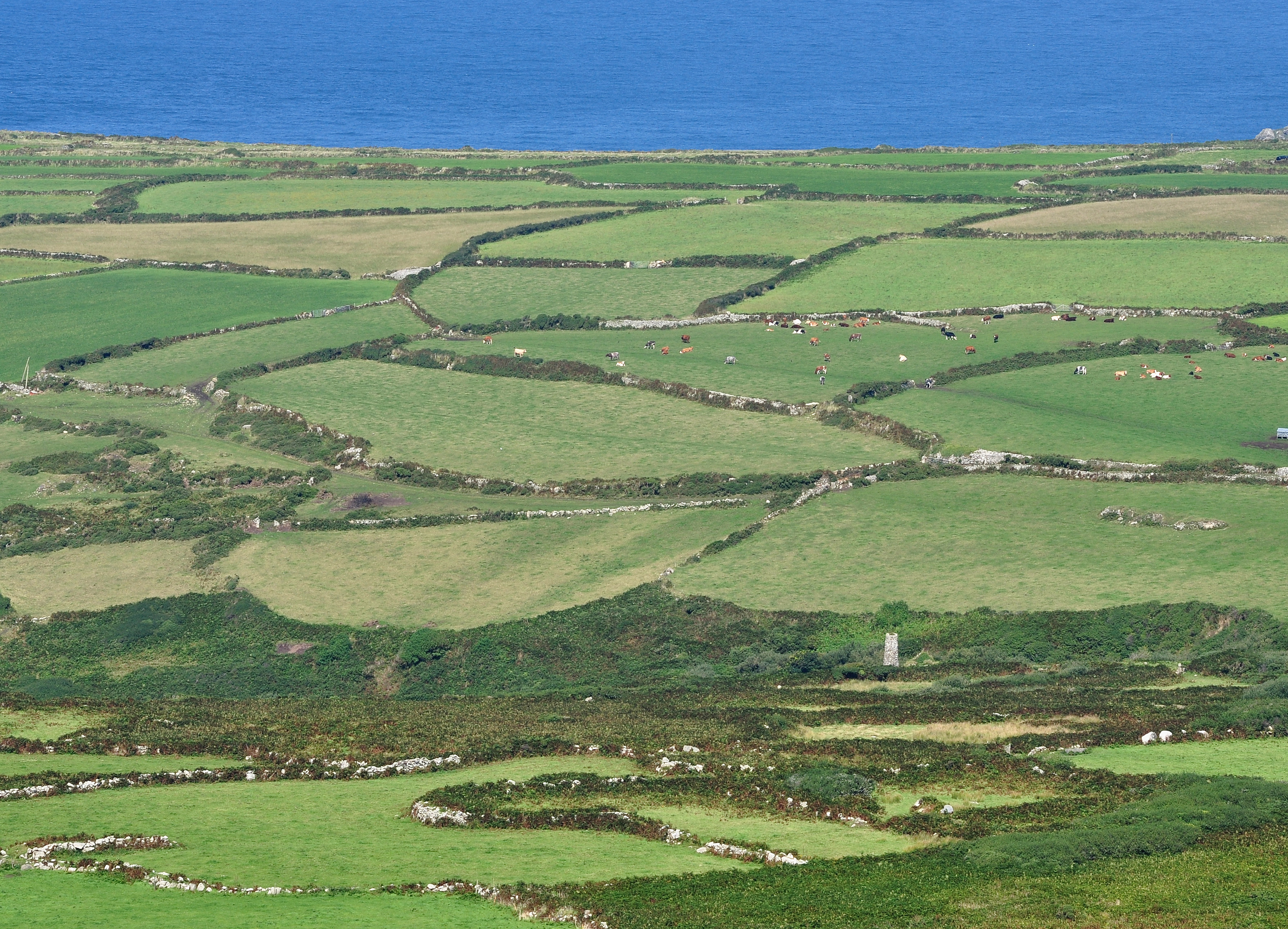
Ancient field system of Cornish hedges near Zennor

There are about 30,000 miles (48,000 km) of hedges in Cornwall today, and their development over the centuries is preserved in their structure. The first Cornish hedges enclosed land for cereal crops during the Neolithic Age (4000–6000 years ago). Prehistoric farms were of about 5 to 10 hectares (12 to 25 acres), with fields about 0.1 hectares (0.25 acres) for hand cultivation.

Some hedges date from the Bronze and Iron Ages, 2000–4000 years ago, when Cornwall's traditional pattern of landscape became established. Others were built during the Mediaeval field rationalisations; more originated in the tin and copper industrial boom of the 18th and 19th centuries, when heaths and uplands were enclosed.

Cornish planning authorities have frequently made it a condition of approval of new developments that the site is bounded by newly made Cornish hedges.

== Maintenance ==
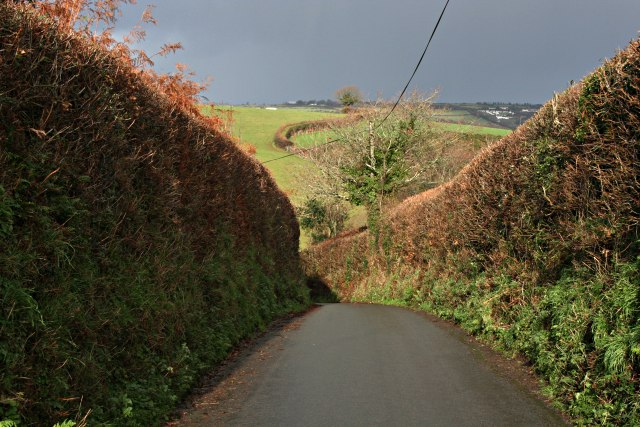
Lane in St Dominic with high hedges

Cornish hedges suffer from the effects of tree roots, burrowing rabbits, rain, wind, farm animals and people. Eventually the hedge sides lose their batter, bulge outwards and stones fall. How often repairs are needed depends on how well the hedge was built, its stone, and what has happened to it since it was last repaired. Typically a hedge needs a cycle of repair every 150 years or so, or less often if it is fenced.

Building new hedges, and repairing existing hedges, is a skilled craft, and there are professional hedgers in Cornwall. The Guild of Cornish Hedgers is the main body promoting the understanding of Cornish hedges in Cornwall.

Charles, at that time Prince of Wales, visited Boscastle on 15 July 2019 to commemorate the anniversary of the Cornwall AONB and to visit a local Cornish hedge restoration project. ‘Kerdroya: The Cornish Hedge Community Heritage Project’ is being carried out in partnership by Golden Tree Productions and the Cornwall Area of Outstanding Natural Beauty (AONB).

== See also ==
- Devon hedge
- Bocage
- Kerdroya
