= Devon hedge =

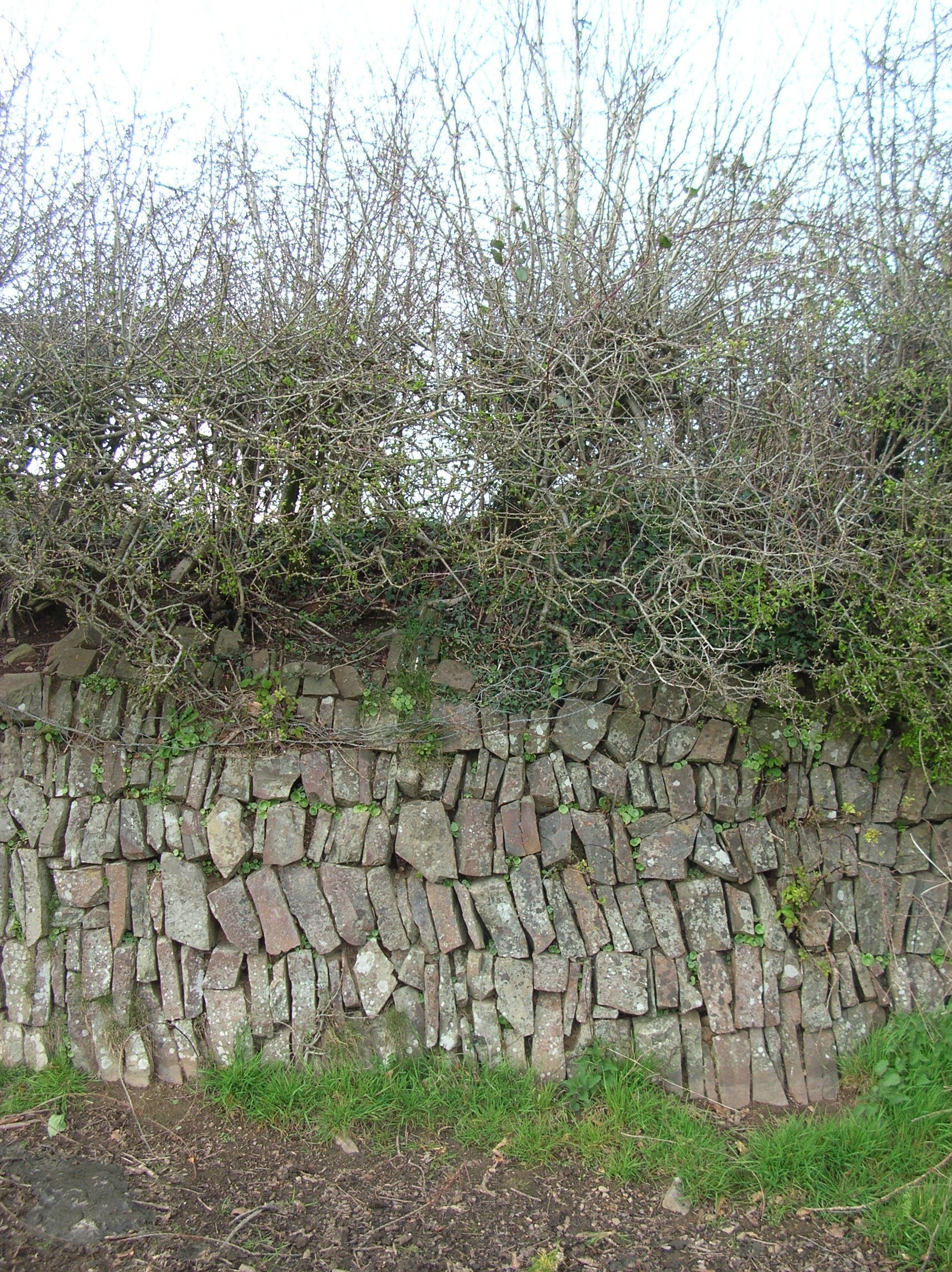
A traditional stone-faced Devon hedge, stones placed on edge

A Devon hedge, also known as a Devon hedgebank, consist of a rubble or earth bank that is usually topped with bushy shrubs forming a hedgerow, with trees also being a frequent and noticeable feature. The bank may be faced with turf or stone.

== History ==
Attention to Devon hedges as a feature worth investigating was raised by Clement Pike in the 1925 volume of the Transactions of the Devonshire Association. Writing about the patchwork of fields visible from Whitchurch Down, near Tavistock on the western fringe of Dartmoor, he noted:

... if you cross the Down and enter one of those fields ... and look about you, you find yourself in a kind of fortress. You are hemmed in by no simple hedge which you could creep through, no mere stone wall which you could vault over, nor by a low earthwork; but you find yourself confronted by a combination of them all. There is the earthwork, but it is faced and built up with solid masonry: granite blocks of all sizes, some huge, some quite small, and topping this construction is the hedge, which in some cases has grown into big trees. Now this suggests questions: What does it mean? Why should the fields in this part of Devon be thus enclosed? Questions easily put; and yet, as far as I am aware, never put before...

A quarter of Devon's hedges are now thought to be over 800 years old. They were primarily constructed for the purposes of agriculture: as an effective livestock-proof barrier; to provide shelter against the wind for livestock and crops; to control soil erosion and surface runoff; and to act as a habitat, together with uncultivated field-edges, for beneficial insects that prey on crop pests. Historically, the hedges and hedgerow trees were also a useful source of timber and wood, and their foliage was eaten by the enclosed livestock.

The archaeologist Francis Pryor observes:

A visitor to Devon and Cornwall cannot fail to be impressed by the massive hedgebanks that so often confine the road into something approaching a ravine or tunnel. The hedgebanks of Devon are sometimes thicker and more massive than those of Cornwall...

There are about 33,000 miles (53,000 km) of hedge in Devon, more than any other county, though this is not all of Devon hedgebank construction. This is because the traditional farming throughout the county has meant that fewer hedges in Devon have been removed than in other counties. The field-pattern of straight hedges enclosing long rectangular fields, as at Combe Martin on the north coast of the county indicates that such areas were once Mediaeval field systems with open cultivated land arranged in strips.

Some Devon hedges represent ancient boundaries, most likely of early Saxon estates (c. 650–700 A.D.), as where double hedgebanks, either side of a path, follow surviving parish boundaries.

== Wildlife ==
Devon's hedges are a particularly important wildlife habitat. Around 20% of the UK's species-rich hedges occur within Devon. Over 600 flowering plants, 1500 insects, 65 birds and 20 mammals have been recorded living or feeding in Devon hedges. At the end of the 20th century it was reported that many of the hedgerow trees in Devon hedges were close to the end of their lives; many of them were planted towards the end of the 19th century and their life-expectancy is not likely to exceed 150 years.

== Maintenance ==
Hedge laying in Devon is usually referred to as steeping and involves cutting and laying steepers (the stems) along the top of the bank and securing them with crooks (forked sticks).

== See also ==
- Bocage
- Cornish hedge

== Sources ==
- Devon County Council and the Devon Hedge Group (1997). Devon's Hedges - Conservation and Management. Devon Books. p. 1. ISBN 1-85522-649-9.
