= Charles Gouyn =

Huguenot jeweller from the 1700s

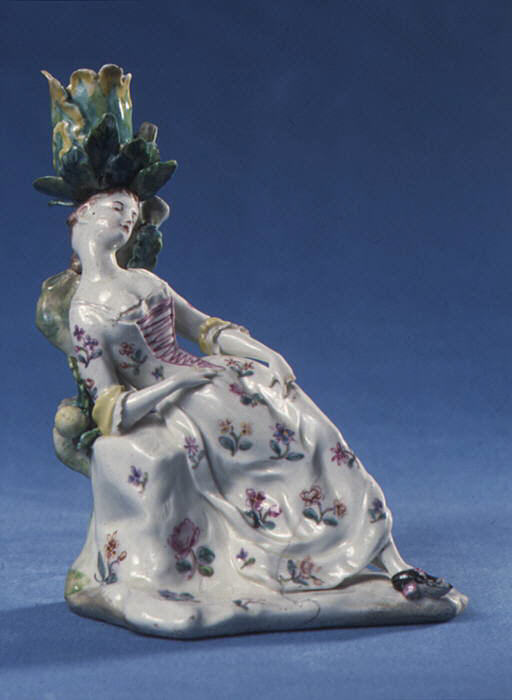
"Candlestick in the form of a dozing figure" from 1750 - 1760

Charles Gouyn (died 1785), a Huguenot born in Dieppe, was a second-generation jeweller with premises 'at the Turk's Head', Bennett Street, St. James's, London (his brother was a jeweller in Paris). Gouyn helped Nicholas Sprimont (1716–1771) set up the Chelsea Porcelain Factory around 1745. But in about 1748 Gouyn severed his links with Sprimont and the Chelsea Porcelain Factory and set out to compete with his own 'Girl-in-a Swing' manufactory, so-called after a figure in the Victoria & Albert which has given its name to a whole class of similar porcelain figures. Gouyn's factory also made small scent bottles, etc. usually with gold or gilt metal mounts collectively known as 'toys'. Some 'Girl-in-a-Swing' products appear to imitate Chelsea porcelain models and vice versa. Research by Bernard Dragesco discovered in French archives in 1993, has established that a group of figures and wares were made in St. James's and the factory is now identified as the St. James's factory. However, the precise location of his factory, and the identity of the modeller of these distinctive figures, remain unknown. Examples of his work are in public collections held in The British Museum, Dallas Museum of Art, Royal Collection Trust, The National Archives, Victoria & Albert Museum and Metropolitan Museum of Art.
