= Lawrence Street =

English cricketer

Lawrence Charles Street (4 February 1920 – April 2004) was an English cricketer who played first-class cricket in four matches for Warwickshire in 1946. He was born at Erdington in Birmingham and died at Hitchin in Hertfordshire, though the precise date of his death is not known.

Street was a lower-order right-handed batsman and a right-arm fast-medium bowler and played occasional games for Warwickshire's second eleven before the Second World War. He played four early-season games in 1946 at a time when county selection was hampered by slow demobilisation of war-time troops; in his first match, he took two Somerset wickets for 15 runs as Warwickshire dismissed their opponents for just 55. But in his three other matches he took only one more wicket, and a month after his debut his first-class cricket career was over.
