= Will Coleman (storyteller) =

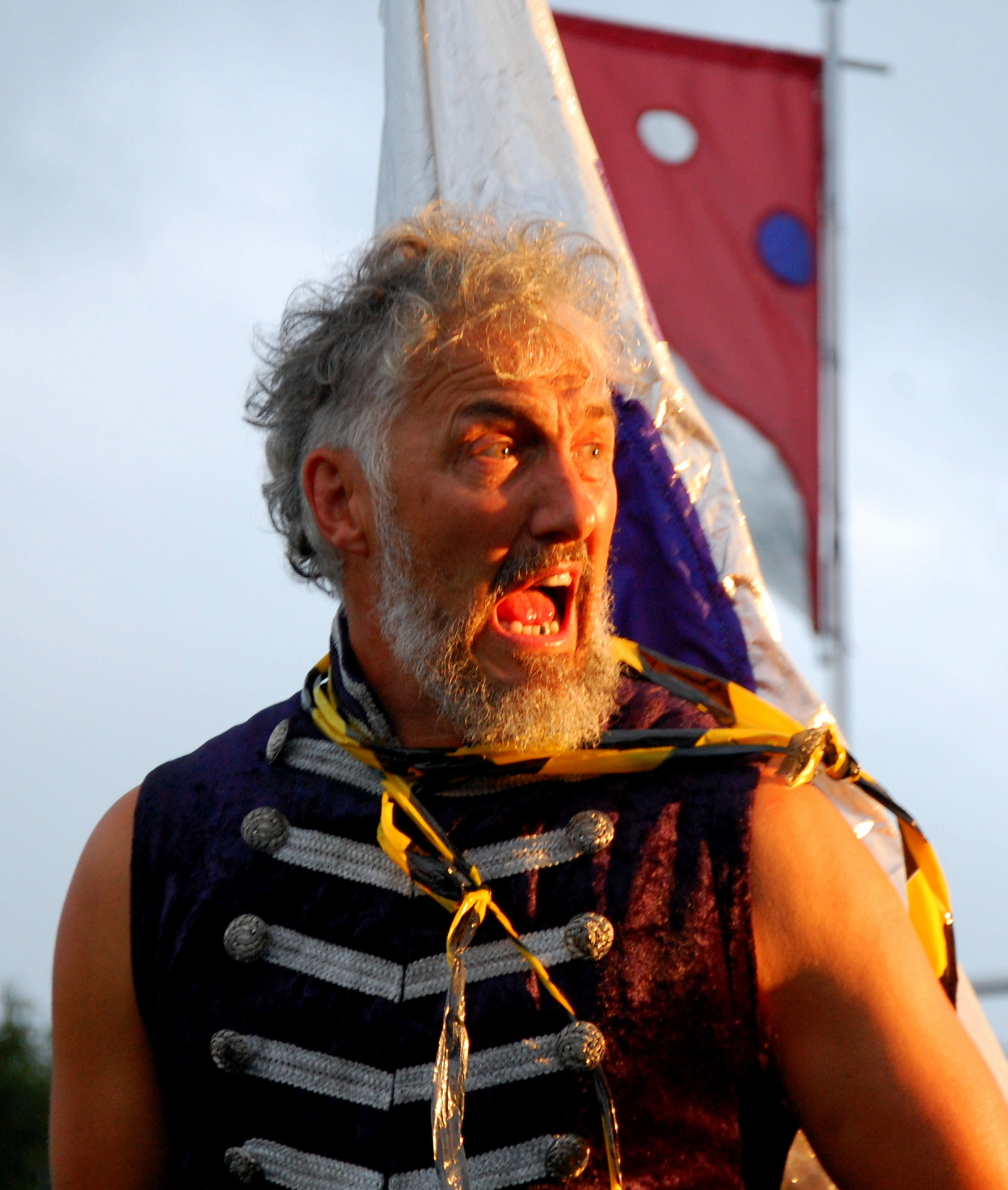
Will Coleman performing in GogMagog in St Mabyn in 2014

Will Coleman is a film-maker, author, musician and educational consultant. Coleman is a former director and musician with Kneehigh Theatre and founder and director of Golden Tree Productions, an organisation that develops cultural projects that promote Cornwall and its history.

== Work ==
In 2009 Coleman's Tales from Porth CD-ROM commissioned by the Cornish Language Partnership won a Media Innovation Award for best DVD/CD Design for a CD-Rom which introduces the Cornish language to children. Coleman won the 2011 Govyn Kernewek film award. “The Govyn Kernewek is an annual £5,000 commission for a short film that uses the Cornish language in an interesting way”.

Coleman's short film Horn of Plenty won an award in 2012, when MPs were invited to enter a film made by one of their constituents into a ‘Film the House’ competition. Dan Rogerson entered the film and it came second overall.

Coleman has investigated the Cornish Plen-an-gwary, medieval Cornish amphitheatres and produced a book about them with funding from the Heritage Lottery Fund and the Arts Council of England.

In 2014 Coleman toured Cornwall in GogMagog with Bec Appleby, Jenny Beare and Steven Kelly, a story rooted in Cornish culture.

The Cornish folk song Black and Gold (Cornish Du an Owr) has English lyrics written by Coleman.

=== Man Engine ===
In 2016 Coleman and his team created "The Man Engine" in the form of a Cornish miner, at 33 feet high, the largest puppet ever made in Britain. The project was commissioned to mark the tenth anniversary of the Cornwall and West Devon Mining Landscape being added to the UNESCO List of World Heritage Sites and was first unveiled in Tavistock on 25 July 2016. The name references the man engine, a mechanism of reciprocating ladders and stationary platforms installed in mines to aid miners' journeys to and from the working levels. The giant puppet travelled to each of the ten World Heritage Site mining areas accompanied by Bal maidens and miners who animated the puppet with ropes; travelling 130 miles ending at the western tip of Cornwall on 6 August. Coleman said “the figure was designed to be a reminder of thousands of years of mining history in Cornwall and the region’s geology”.

== Books ==
- Lutey and the Mermaid illustrated by Jago (Brave Tales Collection) May 2005 ISBN 978-0954965716
- Madgy Figgy's Pig illustrated by Jago (Brave Tales Collection) May 2005 ISBN 978-0954965709
- Tom and the Giant illustrated by Jago (Brave Tales Collection) May 2005 ISBN 978-0954965723
- The Ballad of Gogmagog illustrated by Jago, Hope Education 2105 ISBN 978-1910605059
- Skillywidden illustrated by Jago, Hope Education 2015 ISBN 978-1910605035
- Plen an Gwari: The Playing Places of Cornwall Golden Tree Productions 2015 ISBN 978-0993332203
