= Timeline of Derby =

Coordinates: 52.921944°N 1.475833°W

The following is a timeline of the history of the city of Derby, England.

== Prior to 18th century ==
- 9thC. – Danes take town (approximate date).
- 917
  - Æthelflæd, Lady of the Mercians wins sweeping conquests to oust the Danes.
  - Market active.
- 1160 – Derby School established (approximate date).
- 1206 - First extant charter granted to Derby.
- 1229
  - A second charter granted by Henry III.
  - Derby fair active.
- 1294 – Parliamentary representation begins.
- 1337 - Edward III. on the petition of the burgesses grants them two bailiffs.
- 1530 – All Saints' Church tower built.
- 1592 – Plague.
- 1611 - Derby incorporated by James I.
- 1638 – Henry Mellor becomes mayor.
- 1660 – County Hall built.
- 1665 – Plague.
- 1675 – Derby Company of Mercers formed.
- 1696 – Osmaston Hall built.

== 18th century ==
- 1717 - Silk “throwing” or spinning introduced by John Lombe.
- 1721 – Lombe's Mill built.
- 1726 – Derby Postman newspaper begins publication.
- 1731 – Town Hall built (approximate date).
- 1732 – Derby Mercury newspaper begins publication.
- 1735 – 9 July: Samuel Johnson marries at St Werburgh's Church.
- 1745
  - 4 December: Jacobite army arrives.
  - 5 December: Jacobites meet at Exeter House and decide that Bonnie Prince Charlie, the young Pretender should return to Scotland instead of going on to London.
- 1750
  - Derby Porcelain Company in business.
  - Markeaton Hall built (approximate date).
  - Manufacture of hosiery profited by the inventions of Jedediah Strutt.
- 1756 – County prison built in Nun's Green.
- 1772 – New Jerusalem Chapel built.
- 1773 – Theatre built.
- 1774 – Assembly room built.
- 1783 – Derby Philosophical Society founded.
- 1796 – Derby Canal constructed.

== 19th century ==
- 1802 – General Baptist Chapel built.
- 1805 – King Street Wesleyan Methodist Chapel built.
- 1808
  - Derby Literary and Philosophical Society established.
  - Friends' Meeting House built.
- 1809 – Cox and Co. shot mill built.
- 1810 – Infirmary built.
- 1811
  - Permanent Library established.
  - Population: 13,043.
- 1817 – Derby Choral Society established.
- 1820 – Swedenborgian Chapel built.
- 1823 – Derby Reporter newspaper begins publication.
- 1824 – New Connexion Chapel built.
- 1825 – Mechanics' Institution established.
- 1828
  - Town Hall rebuilt.
  - St. John's Church opens.
- 1832 – Town and County Library established.
- 1833 – Labour strike.
- 1835 – Joseph Strutt elected mayor.
- 1836
  - Police force and Derby Town and County Museum and Natural History Society established.
  - Trinity Church consecrated.
- 1837 – Mechanics' Hall opens.
- 1839
  - May: The founding companies of the Midland Railway begin operating.
  - Derby Exhibition held.
  - St Mary's Church built.
- 1840
  - Derby railway station, Derby Arboretum, and Christ Church open.
  - Athenaeum built (approximate date).
- 1841
  - Derby Baptist Chapel, St Mary's Gate opens
- 1842 – Arboretum Festival begins.
- 1843
  - General Cemetery and Vernon Street Prison in operation.
  - Primitive Methodist Chapel built.
  - Agricultural Show held.
- 1844 – Midland Railway company formed.
- 1846 – St Alkmund's Church built.
- 1850 – Derby Co-operative Society established.
- 1856 – John Smith clockmaker in business.
- 1862 – Corn Exchange opens.
- 1863 – County Cricket Ground established.
- 1866 – Market hall opens.
- 1870 – Derbyshire County Cricket Club formed.
- 1878 – April: Great Northern Railway opens its Derbyshire extension through Friargate railway station.
- 1879
  - Derby Free Library and Museum opens.
  - Derby Daily Telegraph and Reporter begins publication.
- 1882 – Art gallery opens.
- 1884 - Derby County F.C. established as an offshoot of Derbyshire County Cricket Club
- 1886 – 6 May: Grand Theatre burns down.
- 1887 – Derby Sketching Club formed.
- 1888 - Derby becomes a County Borough
- 1891 - Population: 94,146.
- 1895
  - Midland Railway Institute built.
  - Derby County move to play at the Baseball Ground
- 1899 – Derby Technical College founded.

== 20th century ==
- 1901 - Population: 114,848.
- 1902 – Derby Municipal Secondary School for Boys opens.
- 1908 – Rolls-Royce Limited headquartered in Derby on Nightingale Road.
- 1910
  - Victoria Electric Theatre opens.
  - Cosmopolitan Public Hall built.
- 1918 – British Cellulose and Chemical Manufacturing Company plant built.
- 1927 - Derby Cathedral established (formerly All Saints Church) for the newly created Bishop of Derby
- 1930 – Bemrose School opens.
- 1971
  - Rolls-Royce Limited enters receivership before being nationalized.
  - BBC Radio Derby begins broadcasting.
- 1972 - Derby County are Football League Champions for the 1971-72 season
- 1974 – Derby Industrial Museum opens.
- 1975
  - Derby Playhouse opens.
  - Eagle Centre shopping centre in business.
  - Derby County are League Champions again
- 1977 - Derby is awarded City status as part of the Silver Jubilee of Elizabeth II
- 1981 - Social unrest.
- 1988 – Pickford's House Museum of Georgian Life and Costume established.
- 1992
  - University of Derby established.
  - Derby Heritage Centre in business.
- 1995 – Derby Grammar School founded.
- 1997 – Pride Park Stadium opens.
- 1998 – Bronze Age Hanson Log Boat discovered near town.

== 21st century ==
- 2007 – Saint Alkmund's Way Footbridge opens.
- 2009 – Cathedral Green Footbridge opens.
- 2011 – Population: 248,700.
- 2012
  - 11 May: Allenton house fire.

== See also ==
- History of Derby
- Timelines of other cities in East Midlands: Leicester, Lincoln, Nottingham

== Bibliography ==
- Defoe, Daniel & Richardson, Samuel (1778). "(Derby)". A Tour Through the Island of Great Britain (8th ed.). London: J.F. and C. Rivingdon.

=== Published in the 19th century ===
==== 1800s-1840s ====
- Britton, John; Brayley, Edward Wedlake (1802). "Derbyshire: Derby". Beauties of England and Wales. Vol. 3. London: Vernor & Hood. hdl:2027/nyp.33433075909014.
- Hutton, William (1817). History of Derby (2nd ed.). London: Nichols, Son, and Bentley.
- Dugdale, James (1819). "Derbyshire: Derby". New British Traveller. Vol. 2. London: J. Robins and Co.
- "Derbyshire: Derby". Pigot & Co.'s National Commercial Directory for 1828-9. London: James Pigot. 3 September 2023.
- "Derby". Midland Counties' Railway Companion. Nottingham: R. Allen. 1840. OCLC 38701673.
- "Derby Railway Station". Derbyshire. Journey-Book of England. London: C. Knight & Co. 1841.
- Adam, William (1843). "Derby". Gem of the Peak; or, Matlock Bath and its Vicinity (3d ed.). London: Logman & Co.
- Lewis, Samuel (1848). "Derby". Topographical Dictionary of England (7th ed.). London: S. Lewis and Co.

==== 1850s-1890s ====
- Llewellynn Jewitt, ed. (1857). "Derby". Black's Tourist's Guide to Derbyshire (2nd ed.). Edinburgh: Adam and Charles Black.
- "History of the Borough of Derby". History, Gazetteer, and Directory of the County of Derby. Sheffield: Francis White & Co. 1857.
- Measom, George Samuel (1861). "Derby". Official Illustrated Guide to the Great Northern Railway. London: Griffin, Bohn. OCLC 12433505.
- Knight, Charles, ed. (1867). "Derby". English Cyclopaedia. Vol. II: Geography. London: Bradbury, Evans, & Co. hdl:2027/nyp.33433000064794.
- "Derby". Kelly's Directory of Nottinghamshire and Derbyshire. 1881.
- Visitors' Guide and Handbook to Derby and to the Royal Agricultural Show. Derby. 1881.
- "Derby". Handbook for Travellers in Derbyshire, Nottinghamshire, Leicestershire, and Staffordshire (3rd ed.). London: J. Murray. 1892. OCLC 2097091.
- "Derby". History, Topography, and Directory of Derbyshire. Preston: T. Bulmer & Co. 1895.
- Gross, Charles (1897). "Derby". Bibliography of British Municipal History. New York: Longmans, Green, and Co.

=== Published in the 20th century ===
- Firth, J. B. (1905). "Derby". Highways and byways in Derbyshire. London: Macmillan and Co. OCLC 882321.
- Davison, A.W. (1906). Derby: its rise and progress. London: Bemrose & Sons.
- "Derby". Great Britain (7th ed.). Leipzig: Karl Baedeker. 1910. hdl:2027/mdp.39015010546516.
- "Derby (England)" . Encyclopædia Britannica. Vol. 8 (11th ed.). 1910. pp. 69–70.
- Eccleshare, C.F. (1934). Derby; a study in urban development. University of London.
- Heath, J. (1979). "The borough of Derby between 1780 and 1810". Journal of the Derbyshire Archaeological Society.
- Delves, A. (1981). "Popular recreation and social conflict in Derby, 18000-1850". In Yeo, E.; Yeo, S. (eds.). Popular Culture and Class Conflict 1850–1914. Brighton.
