= James Stephen Gresley =

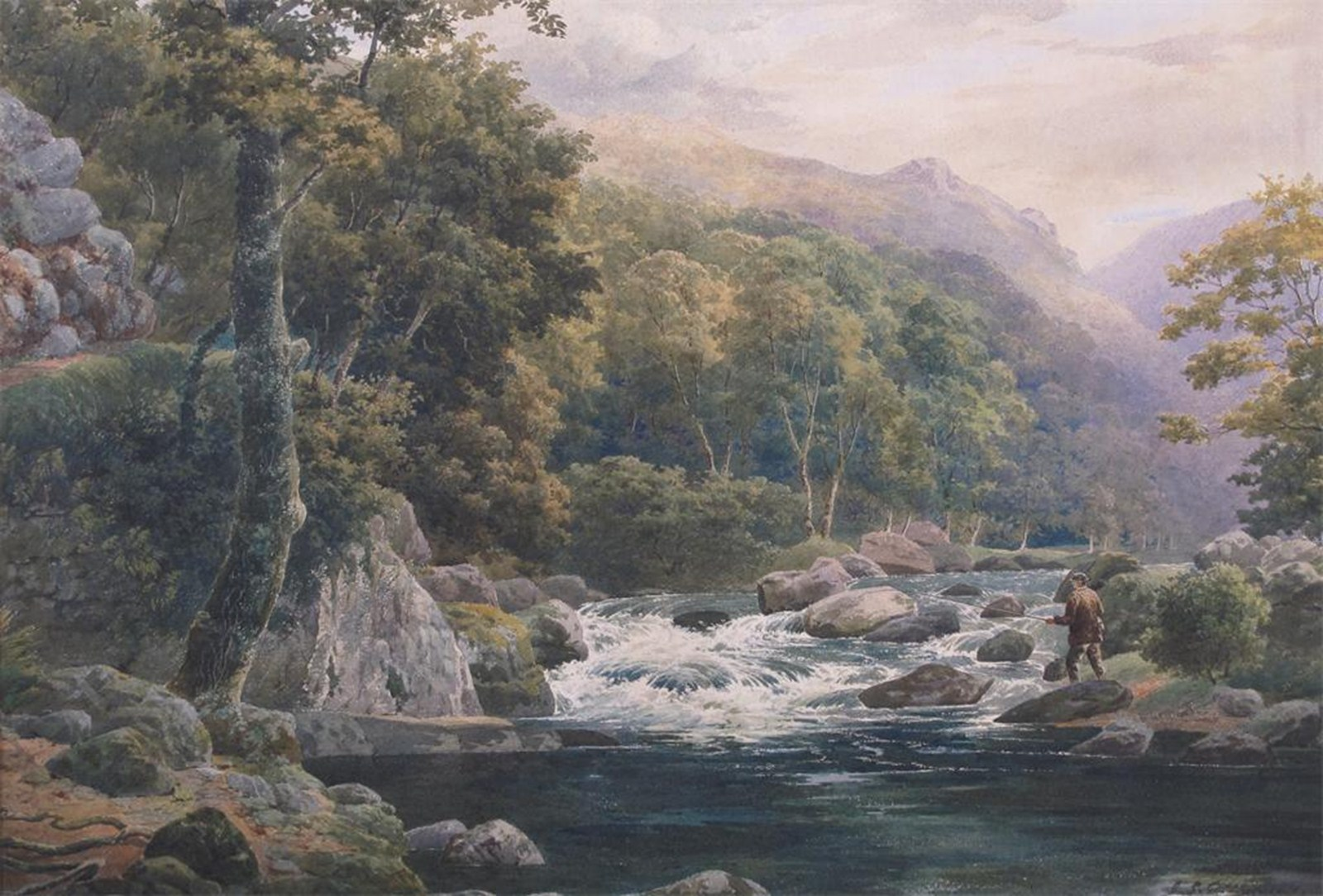
- "On the Dove"
- Born: 1829; Sandiacre, England
- Died: 1908 (aged 78–79); Wakefield, England
- Known for: First of a line of Derbyshire artists

James Stephen Gresley (1829–1908) was an English artist, the first of a line of artists from Derbyshire.

== Biography ==
Gresley was born in Sandiacre in Derbyshire. His son was Frank Gresley who had, in turn, two sons, Harold and Cuthbert who were noted artists. Gresley had a number of paintings included in the "Goodey Collection" and in the related book.

Gresley lived at Draycott, Borrowash and Chellaston in Derbyshire, but he also lived latterly in Yorkshire, where he created watercolours of the counties where he had lived. Gresley died in Wakefield, Yorkshire, in 1908 after exhibiting in galleries in London and locally. He has several paintings in Derby Museum and Art Gallery with one currently (2011) on display in the Goodey Room in Derby Central Library.
