= Ernest Townsend =

English artist

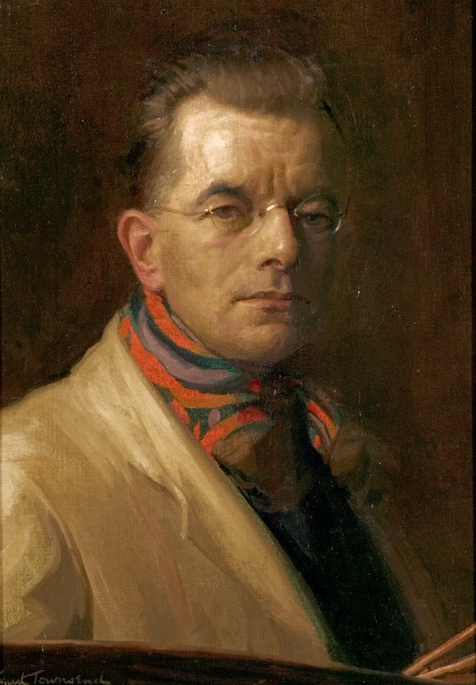
- Townsend, self portrait
- Born: 1 January 1880; Derby, England
- Died: 22 January 1944 (aged 64); Derby, England
- Education: Heatherley School of Fine Art and Royal Academy
- Occupation: Portrait artist
- Spouse: Doris Elsie Campbell
- Children: David, Barry, Alison, Bruce
- Relatives: W G Paulson Townsend (brother)

Ernest Townsend (1 January 1880 – 22 January 1944) was a British portraitist from Derby.

Townsend studied at Derby College of Art, Heatherleys in Chelsea and the Royal Academy. Among his works were a 1915 portrait of the Right Hon. Winston Churchill when he was First Lord of the Admiralty. This picture now hangs in the National Liberal Club in London.

Townsend was commissioned to create a design for the roofs of the Rolls-Royce aircraft engine factories in Derby so that they would appear to German bombers to be no more than a village.

== Early years ==
Ernest Townsend was born in Parliament Street in Derby, the eighth child of James Townsend. His father was a coach builder with Holmes of Derby (later Sanderson & Holmes). Coach building had been the Townsend profession practised for at least three generations. James' father, William, had moved from Bitton in Gloucestershire to Newark in circa 1850 and then Derby in the late 1850s. However, by the age of five, Townsend's caregiver was his elder sister, Florence. His eldest brother William George Paulson Townsend was later the editor of the Art Workers Quarterly and publisher of numerous arts and furniture books.

His early education was at Abbey Street School and at the age of 14 he was apprenticed to a firm of architects, Wright and Thorpe (later known as T.H. Thorpe Associates), practising at 23 St James St, Derby. Thomas Harrison Thorpe, the junior partner, recognised Townsend's artistic ability immediately and a lifelong friendship developed between them. Ernest's brother William George Paulson Townsend was a major influence on Ernest's early artistic interests. William studied at Derby Technical and Art College and later, Royal College of Art, South Kensington, introducing Ernest to scholars, educators and clients.

== Heatherleys and the Royal Academy ==
Townsend's early promise was justified and eventually he left architecture altogether and embarked on a full-time course at the Heatherly School of Fine Art in London. He then moved to a five-year course at the Royal Academy Schools. He was enrolled as a student in the School of Painting at the Royal Academy from 28 January until January 1907. Amongst his tutors at the Academy Schools were John Singer Sargent and Lawrence Alma-Tadema. His friends included Aubrey Beardsley, Alfred Munnings, Augustus John, and Laura Knight. Townsend exhibited 15 paintings at the academy between 1910 and 1937, as shown below.

As an impecunious art student, he lived with his brother, William George Paulson Townsend, who had become Design Master at the Royal School of Needlework and was an author and editor of various art publications. Ernest supplemented his income with design work for these magazines, in particular for The Art Workers' Quarterly, of which his brother was founder and editor.

In 1904 he won the Royal Academy's Landseer Scholarship for figure painting and in 1905 he won the academy's Creswick Prize for 'Willows and Weeds', a painting donated by his family after his death to the Derby Art Gallery.

== Return to Derby ==
In 1907, he left London. After some time in Paris and the Netherlands, he returned to Derby, where he had a studio in Full Street, living in nearby Coxbench. In 1912, Townsend, like his friends, Alfred Munnings and Laura Knight, represented Great Britain in the Olympic Games in Stockholm by entering a painting in the Olympic Art exhibition.

At the age of 25, Townsend was commissioned to paint his former headmaster at the School of Art, T.C. Simmonds. This painting was later accepted by the Royal Academy for its 1910 Summer Exhibition. Perhaps it was this success that led to another commission from the Town for a portrait of the Libraries Museum and Art Gallery Director, William Crowther, upon his retirement in 1911. Many more "official" commissions were to come from the Town for the remainder of Townsend's life; a succession of mayoral portraits can be seen in the Council chamber today. His work was part of the painting event in the art competition at the 1912 Summer Olympics.

=== Portrait of Winston Churchill ===
Townsend's 1915 portrait of the Right Hon. Winston Churchill when he was First Lord of the Admiralty was commissioned anonymously. This picture now hangs in the National Liberal Club in London, but it was not hung until 1944. Churchill had been unavailable to unveil it in 1915, and when he was available, he was no longer popular in the Liberal Club. The portrait was mothballed and retrieved for public viewing only following Churchill's success in 1944, when he was belatedly asked to unveil it.

=== The Derby Sketching Club ===
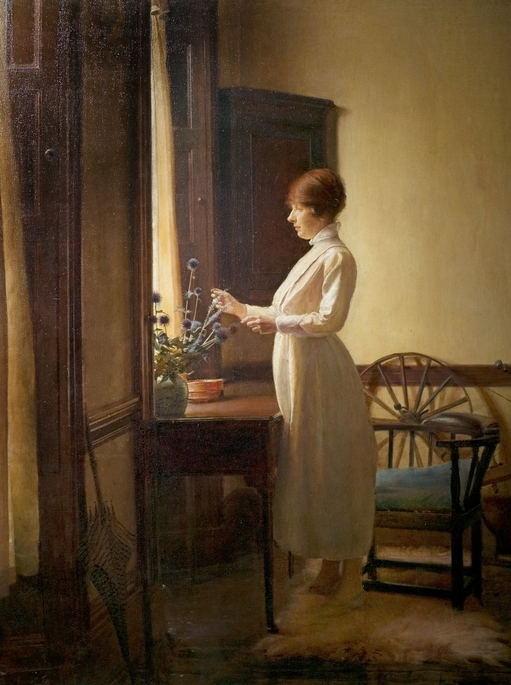
Summer Morning Interior by Townsend dated 1917 uses his wife as the model.

Just as the Academy Schools had its elite band of artists—Munnings, Laura Knight, et al.—so did Derby on a lesser scale. Edwardian Derby had its own band of regional artists: Alfred John Keene (also noted for his fine early photography), S. H. Parkin, and Frank Gresley. These and a number of lesser known but competent artists met via the Derby Sketching Club, to which Townsend was immediately attracted. He was to remain a member of the club for the rest of his life and he found a patron in Alfred E. Goodey via the club.

It was at the Sketching Club that he met Peter Campbell and his son Percy. Peter had moved from Stockton-on-Tees to work for the Bemrose Company as a commercial artist, although he later went freelance. Campbell produced much work for the Midland Railway. The friendship led to Ernest being invited to the Campbells' home on Havelock Road in Derby, which was then almost in the country. The three men shared an interest not only in art, but in amateur music. In this they were joined by Peter's daughter, Doris, who was an accomplished pianist to her father's violin and Townsend's baritone. Doris was also a member of the Sketching Club. Townsend married Doris Campbell on 30 December 1912 at St James' Church in Clapham. Townsend'd 1917 picture titled Summer Morning Interior has his wife as the main character.

== World War II ==
When Townsend died in 1944, some said it was due to overwork. He had been busy during the war creating designs that could be used to camouflage Rolls-Royce's aircraft engine factories in Derby. These factories built the Merlin engines that powered the Spitfire and Hurricane fighters. Using his skills, he made the factory appear from the air to be no more than a village.

== Legacy ==
In 1944 Derby Art Gallery put on a memorial exhibition in his honour. Derby Art Gallery still houses a large collection of his work, although not on permanent display. Townsend's death in 1944 means that his works are now in the public domain. There is a permanent display of reproductions of many of his works in the Standing Order public house in Derby. In addition there are sixty paintings in public collections in the United Kingdom.

In February 2024, the Mayor of Derby Alan Graves announced that Derby City Council planned to rename its council chamber after Townsend, saying that "it can be argued that he saved Great Britain with his artistic abilities."

== Major works ==
- Exeter Bridge, Derby
- Derby Fish Market by Night
- Winston Churchill, 1915
- Scene in Market Place during Gun Week, 18 to 23 November 1918
- A Glimpse of Derby Market Place on Carnival Day, 1926
- Hospital Carnival Day, 1935

== Exhibits at the Royal Academy ==
Ernest Townsend Exhibits at the Royal Academy 1910 - 1937

- 1910 T C Simmonds Esq
- 1913 Arthur Smith Esq
- 1915 "And battle, death and destiny roll-on, while loving hearts beat anxiously at home."
- 1916 A Native of Derbyshire & The Studio Doorway
- 1917 The Attic Stairs & A Derbyshire Cottage
- 1918 Gossip & Summer Morning
- 1919 The Balloon Man
- 1927 A Balloon Shop
- 1932 Hanna
- 1933 Schoolboy's Holiday
- 1934 T Harrision Thorpe Esq
- 1937 Carnival Day in Derby
