= Derby Sketching Club =

Art club in Derby, England

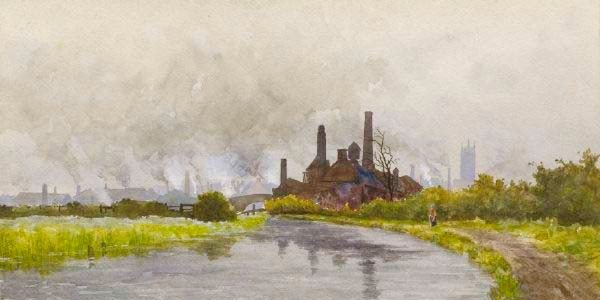
The Sharon Chemical Works- A J Keene, a member of the Derby Sketching Club

The Derby Sketching Club is a members' club now meeting in Mickleover, Derby, England. It was founded in 1887, and still meets today, providing members with a creative environment and the opportunity to meet up with like-minded local people, sharing their interest in painting and drawing. Early members included F. Booty, Alfred John Keene, William Swindell, George Thompson, Charles Terry and Frank Timms

== History ==
In 1887, a group of young men held a meeting at the County Hotel in Derby and founded the Derby Sketching Club with the aim of providing a place where they and others could work and share their interest in painting and sketching, a place to share their art. The first exhibition of their work was held in January 1889, at the Athenaeum Rooms.

In 1922, the Derby Ladies Art Group was formed and it was only in 1951, for the Festival of Britain, that the two groups first held a joint Exhibition. They finally merged in 1966.

The art collector Alfred E. Goodey. amassed the work of Derby Sketching Club members, and in the 1940s presented it to Derby Museum and Art Gallery.

== Current activities ==
The club activities are mainly based on regular life drawing, portrait painting and still life sessions. The club also has guest lecturers and demonstrations. There are weekly sketching opportunities at Derby Museum and Art Gallery and Derby Museum of Making. Outings are arranged in the summer months including outdoor sketching at various Derbyshire locations and trips to art exhibitions all over the UK. The club has an annual exhibition at Markeaton Park Craft Village with a Trophy prize awarded. Members use the club website to showcase their work.

== Other notable members ==
Ernest Townsend, R. W. Bardill, Harold Gresley and J. P. Wale, Andrew McCara
