= Claude Thomas Stanfield Moore =

English painter

- Born: Tom Claude Stanfield Moore; 1 June 1853; Nottingham, Nottinghamshire, England
- Died: 2 April 1901 (aged 47); Nottingham, England

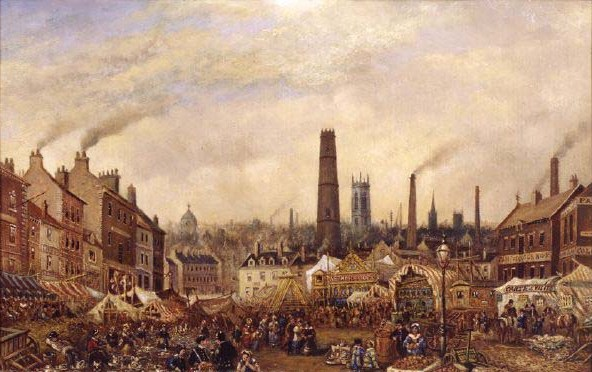
The Morledge in Derby with a fair in progress

Claude Thomas Stanfield Moore (1 June 1853 – 2 April 1901) was a British artist from Nottingham who flourished from 1876 until his death in 1901. He was initially a landscape artist, but became better known for his maritime scenes and views over the Thames.

== Biography ==
Moore initially earned a living as a lithographic draftsman, until, at the age of 27, he was able to support himself as an independent artist and from about 1880, exhibited his work regularly at the Nottingham Castle Art Museum, the Nottingham Society of Artists and at other towns in the region.

Moore's father, Thomas Cooper Moore, was a founder-member of the Nottingham Society of Artists and besides pursuing his career as an architect, still found time to create many attractive pictures and teach and encourage his sons with their artistic skills.

Claude, his father and brother Reuben (more commonly spelt Rubens) Arthur were all praised for their scenes of Old Nottingham and captured many scenes of disappearing Britain, featuring country life and buildings of character, working with line drawings, monochrome, watercolors and oils.

One of the Derby exhibits was "Fair-day in the Morledge", depicting a bustling city centre Easter fair, at Derby, see image in the right hand panel. This picture, now in the possession of the Derby Museum and Art Gallery, was exhibited at Mr. Keene’s picture exhibition in Derby, according to the Derby Mercury of 31 May 1882, by T. C. Moore but is now attributed to Claude T. S.

By 1891, Claude T. S. had declared himself an Artist, Marine; his pictures are predominantly river scenes or coastal scenes with vessels drawn in intimate detail, always with dramatic lighting effects. Claude had a studio in Nottingham but worked mainly in London from 1882 and painted many London scenes, some of the most prominent being his views of the Thames, its wharves, ships; and his views of the Houses of Parliament and Westminster, from the river.

One painting, called "The Pool of London", which was created jointly by Claude and his father in 1879, sold at auction in 1999 for £12,000.

Claude was said to have been influenced by the Nottingham painters Henry Dawson and J. M. W. Turner due to the use of light in his paintings, although it has been said that his paintings of the Thames give the impression that "the Thames is in the tropics". Moore died in 1901 at the age of 47 shortly after his father.

The work of Claude, his father, Thomas Cooper and his brother, Reuben Arthur (usually called Rubens) is similar in character and variety; all sought charming urban and rural scenes, coastal scenes and seascapes in the British Isles and Western Europe. With Claude and his father having two initials in common, there is potential for confusion.

Reuben (Rubens) has one painting in the collection of the Merchant Adventurers' Hall in York, two in the British Postal Museum & Archive and others in the Nottingham Castle Museum collection, while their father has a number of paintings in Nottingham Castle Museum and also in the Nottinghamshire Archives, Nottingham Central Library, and Nottinghamshire County Hall.
