= Alfred Seaman =

Victorian photographer known for his stereoscopic photographs

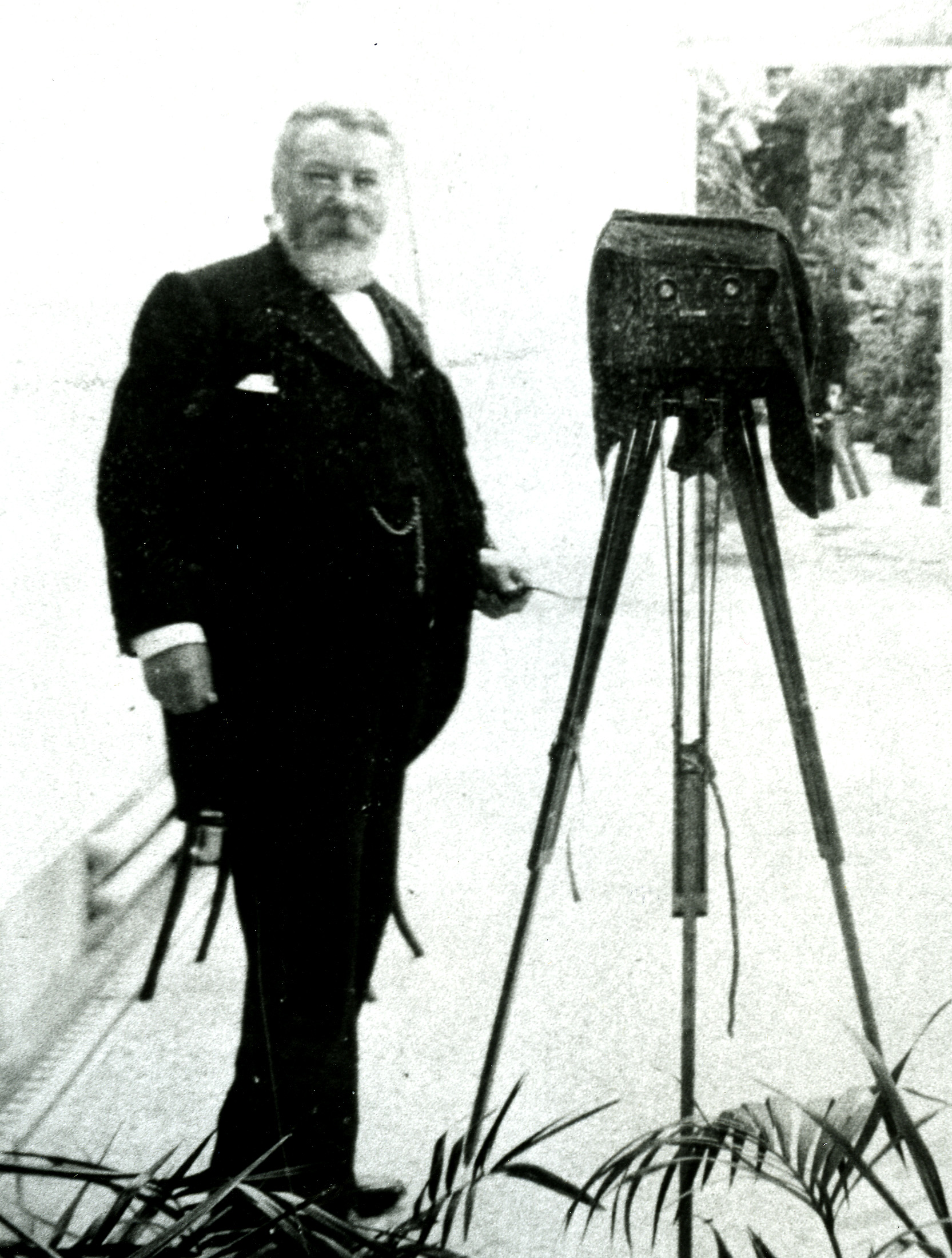
Alfred Seaman. Detail from a stereoscopic self-portrait circa 1901

Alfred Seaman was a professional Victorian and Edwardian photographer who ran a network of photographic portrait studios in the Midlands and North of England. He published a large (2,000 + views) series of stereoscopic photographs of Great Britain, Ireland and the Isle of Man.

Alfred Seaman was born in Norfolk in about 1844. He began his working life as a builder and took up photography as a hobby in the 1860s. He opened his first studio in Chesterfield Derbyshire in 1880 and subsequently ran studios in, Ilkeston, Alfreton, Matlock, Sheffield, Leeds, Newcastle, Liverpool, Hull and Brighton.

In 1886, he was a founding member of the Photographic Convention of the United Kingdom (PCUK) which held its first convention in Derby. He served on the Committee of the PCUK from 1886 until his death and through this organisation he had links with eminent professional photographers of the day including Henry Peach Robinson, William Crooke, William England, Alexander Tate and Richard Keene, as well as the many wealthy amateurs who were members, such as the astronomer Professor Alexander Stewart Herschel.

He was married three times and had 9 sons and a daughter. All but one of his sons followed him into the photographic trade and ran studios either under the 'Seaman & Sons' title or in their own name. He died in Sheffield in 1910.
