= Metro Cinema =

Metro Cinema may refer to:

- Metro Cinema (Derby), closed 2008
- Metro Cinema (Mumbai) 1938–2006 name, now Metro BIG Cinemas, Mumbai
- Metro Cinema (Kolkata), a single screen movie theatre in Kolkata (formerly Calcutta)
- Metro Cinema Edmonton, a non-profit organization and registered charity located in Edmonton, Alberta, Canada
- The former Minerva Theatre, Sydney, which was renamed Metro Cinema in 1950
