= Romeo and Juliet: the Tomb Scene =

Painting by Joseph Wright of Derby

Romeo and Juliet: The Tomb Scene
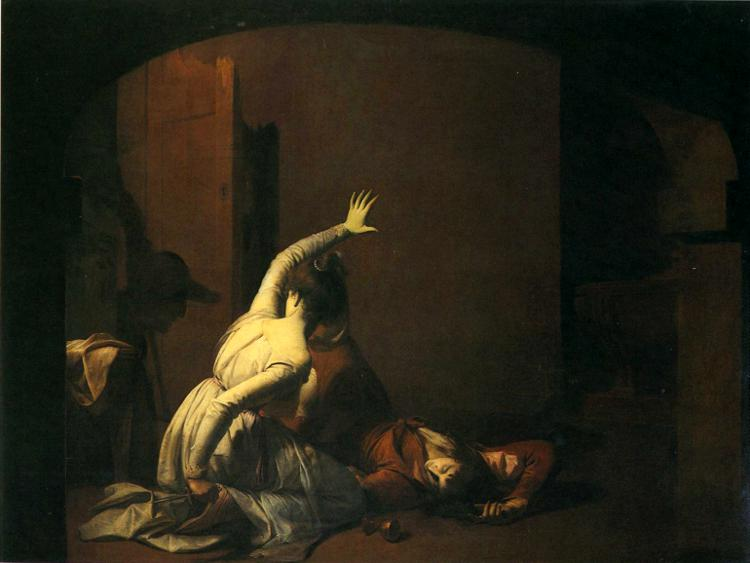
- Artist: Joseph Wright of Derby
- Year: 1790
- Medium: Oil on canvas
- Dimensions: 180 cm × 240 cm (70 in × 95 in)
- Location: Derby Museum and Art Gallery, Derby

Romeo and Juliet: the Tomb Scene is a painting by Joseph Wright of Derby, completed by 1790, exhibited in 1790 and 1791, shown in the Derby Exhibition of 1839 in the Mechanics' Institute, and now displayed in Derby Museum and Art Gallery. The painting exhibits Wright's famed skill with nocturnal and candlelit scenes. It depicts the moment in Shakespeare's Romeo and Juliet when Juliet, kneeling beside Romeo's body, hears a footstep and draws a dagger to kill herself. The line is "Yea, noise? Then I'll be brief. O happy dagger!"

== History ==
The idea for the painting came from Wright in December 1776 when he proposed a painting of "Juliet waking in the tomb". The commission was agreed by Alderman John Boydell for his "Shakespeare Gallery". However the work was the cause of a major row between them. Wright discovered that Boydell had classified the painters he had commissioned into two classes. Wright had discovered that he was assigned to the second class. He was to be paid 300 pounds for one painting and he was aggrieved to discover that some artists were being paid a thousand pounds. Wright's objection was more to do with the damage to his reputation than for the loss of income.

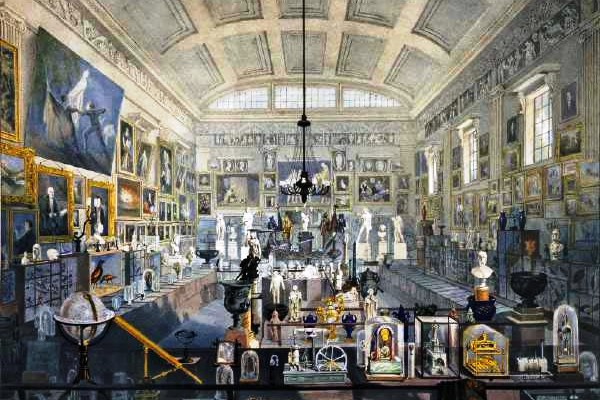
The Derby Exhibition (1839) by Samuel Rayner. Romeo and Juliet: the tomb scene can be seen on display on the far wall, towards the left

Boydell was unrepentant and although Wright's painting of Romeo and Juliet was ready in time it was his painting of The Tempest (now lost) and a more modest scene of the storm in The Winter's Tale that were Wright's contribution to Boydell's gallery. Wright was left with this painting which is thought the best of the three he had created for the gallery. It could be that there was another disagreement that led to James Northcote creating a nine by eleven feet Romeo and Juliet tomb scene painting for Boydell which was very well received by gallery visitors.

Wright had the painting exhibited in the Royal Academy in 1790 but he was not content as he said it had been badly presented due to its late arrival. However Wright felt privately that he had been snubbed by the Royal Academy and was happy to exhibit five paintings at the Society of Artists of Great Britain. Before the painting was exhibited at the Society the following year it was reworked by Wright but it still failed to sell. The painting is also known to have been included in an exhibition at Derby's Mechanics' Institute. Wright's painting was included in a painting of the 1839 exhibition by Samuel Rayner. Many of the paintings in Rayner's painting are thought to have come from the collection of Joseph Strutt. Many of the other artefacts in Rayner's painting are thought to have joined the early collection of Derby Museums, but this painting took many years before it rejoined Derby Museum's collection.

As a result of Wright's argument with Boydell the painting was rejected and stayed in Wright's possession. It was at Christie's in 1801 and in Derby for sale in 1810, but it failed to find a buyer. It was bought from Wright's executors and it was in the Oakes family from 1883 until it was purchased for Derby Museums for £33,250 in 1981.

== Description ==
The painting is 70 inches high and 95 wide and shows Wright's famed skill with nocturnal and candlelit scenes. It depicts the moment in Shakespeare's Romeo and Juliet at which Juliet, kneeling beside Romeo's body, hears a footstep and draws Romeo's dagger. Juliet's line is "Yea, noise? Then I'll be brief. O happy dagger!" and is said just before Juliet kills herself. In addition to this painting, Derby Museum also own a preparatory sketch by Wright. On the sketch he proposes the change he made to the painting where he moved the sarcophagus and its niche to the right. Wright was trying to increase the size of the image of the illuminated wall. The gladiatorial figure of Juliet with her outstretched arms attracts the eye and the heroic death of Romeo have been compared to Michelangelo's drawing of Tityus.
