= Frank Gresley =

British artist

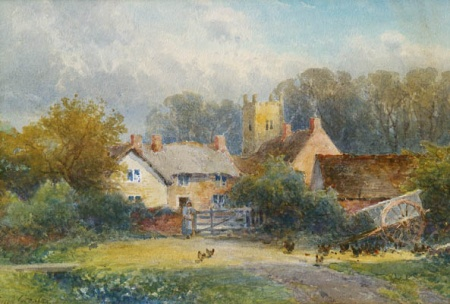
Frank Gresley, Derbyshire's Swarkestone in 1890

Frank Gresley (1855–1936) was an English artist. He painted mainly landscapes, of which the best known are those of the River Trent at Swarkestone, Barrow upon Trent and Ingleby, Derbyshire. His father, James Stephen Gresley, was an artist, and his two sons Harold and Cuthbert also became artists.

Gresley lived most of his life in Chellaston, Derbyshire. Some of his paintings were donated to Derby Museum and Art Gallery by Alfred E. Goodey.
