= Derby Exhibition (1839) =

Art exhibition in the United Kingdom

Coordinates: 52°55′21.08″N 1°28′45.74″W

Interior of the Mechanics' Institute
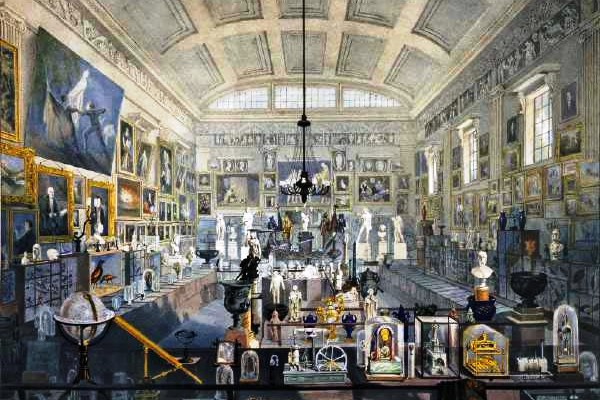
- Artist: Samuel Rayner
- Year: 1839
- Type: Hand coloured lithograph print
- Location: Derby Museum and Art Gallery; Derby

The Derby Exhibition of 1839 was the first exhibition in Derby. It was held at the town's Mechanics' Institute, which later became known as Albert Hall. The exhibition was in line with the founding values of the Institute, which were to extend the spread of knowledge among the people of Derby. The institute had organized a wide range of events since 1825, including lectures, concerts, and displays. The exhibition followed the first such organised by Manchester Mechanics Institute in 1837 and Derby's was one of several that were organised that year in English industrial towns and cities. Derby's exhibition had a profound impact and was one of the factors leading to the foundation of the Museum and Library in 1878. Derby Museum and Art Gallery, which is next door to what was the Mechanics Institute building, now holds many of the objects from the exhibition.

The exhibition was organised to pay for a lecture hall which had just been added in 1837 to the Derby Mechanic's institute premises in the Wardwick. Although these organisations were called Mechanic's Institutes they were funded and organised by dignitaries and not by mechanics. The exhibition attracted over 96,000 people and Derby's institute as a result was placed on a good financial basis.

The exhibition is the subject matter of Interior of the Mechanics' Institute, a hand coloured lithograph print from a drawing by Samuel Rayner. This print shows the Lecture Hall, which was the main hall of the Institute. The hall was described at the time as "in the Grecian style... with a handsome chandelier ...and many valuable paintings". Around the top of the room is a frieze similar to work by John Henning. Over one thousand objects were displayed there including many that belonged to the philanthropist Joseph Strutt. The exhibits to a variety of categories: paintings by Joseph Wright (Romeo and Juliet can be seen on display on the far wall, towards the left), scientific instruments, fossils, a coconut...

The Derby exhibition was admired by the mechanics institutes in nearby Leicester and Nottingham and both organised similar exhibitions the following year. They also were able to charter a train on the newly opened railway to carry their members on a railway excursion.
