= Photographic Convention of the United Kingdom =

Society of photographers

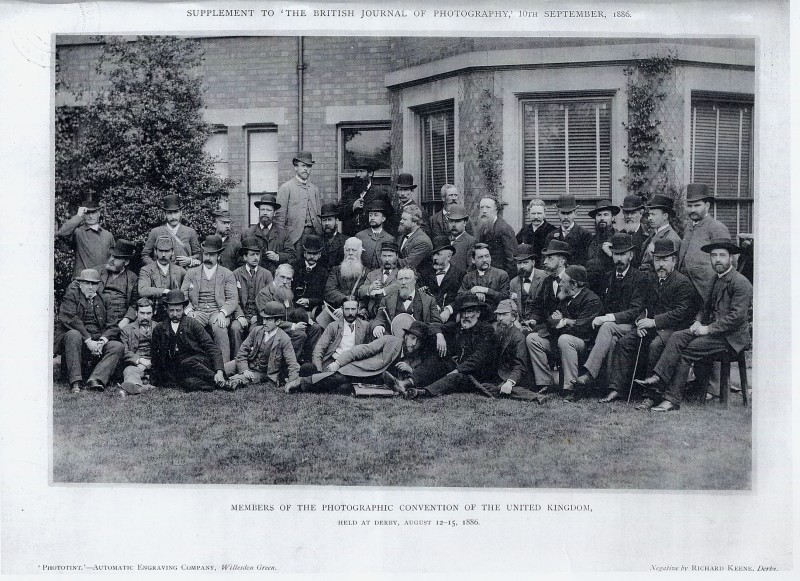
The founding members of the PCUK at the inaugural meeting in Derby 1886

The Photographic Convention of United Kingdom (PCUK) was founded in 1886 and held its first convention in the city of Derby, England, in August of that year.

The founding members were a mixture of professional photographers and wealthy amateurs. Prominent professional photographers present at the first meeting included William England, principal photographer with the London Stereoscopic Company; Richard Keene, who later became a member of The Brotherhood of the Linked Ring and Alfred Seaman who established a large number of studios across the Midlands and North of England. The leading pictorialist photographer Henry Peach Robinson was an early member and was elected President in 1896. William Crooke the prominent Scottish professional photographer was elected president in 1899. Many of the founding members were also members of the Royal Photographic Society but sought to establish an organisation with a more informal and sociable purpose- ‘combining the features of a pleasurable outing with photographic mental friction.’

Attendance at the first meeting was 48 but grew rapidly over coming years to reach 328 by the 1898 event. The pattern of the convention was to choose a town where they would be 'hosted' by a local photographic society. A large hotel was chosen as the convention headquarters and three to four days were devoted to a programme of lectures, outings, exhibitions and dinners.

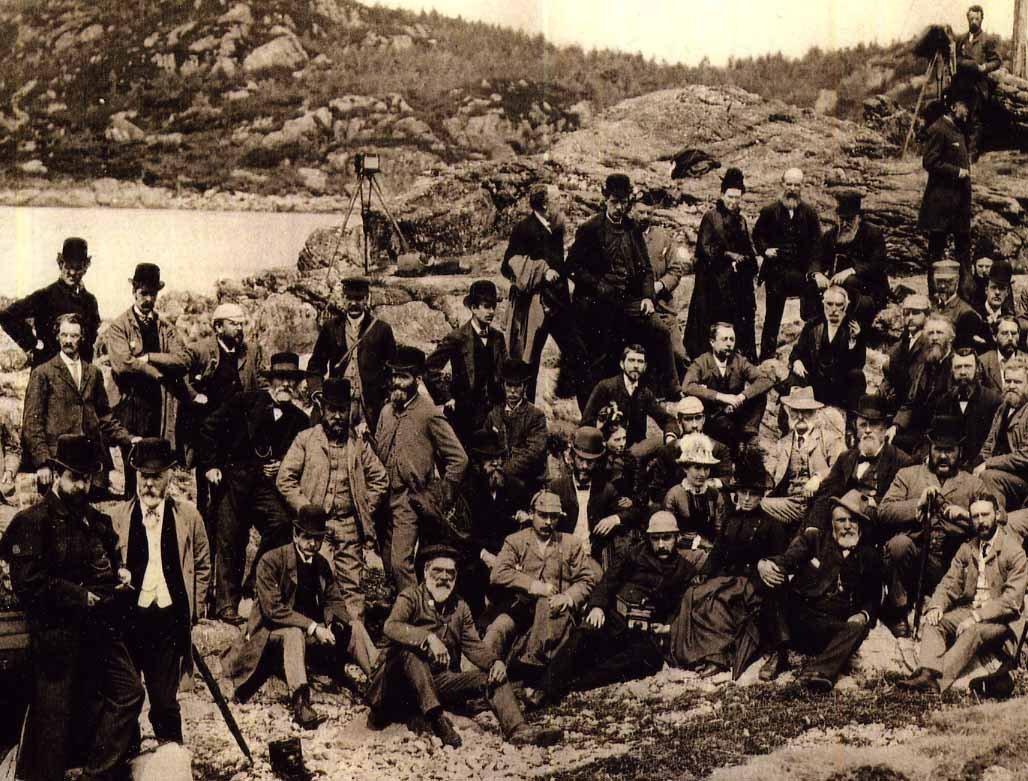
The members of the PCUK on an outing to Tarbert during the 1887 Convention in Glasgow.

Conventions of the Victorian era were held in:

- 1886 Derby
- 1887 Glasgow
- 1888 Birmingham
- 1889 London
- 1890 Chester
- 1892 Edinburgh
- 1893 Plymouth
- 1894 Dublin
- 1895 Shrewsbury
- 1896 Leeds
- 1897 Great Yarmouth
- 1898 Glasgow
- 1899 Gloucester
- 1900 Newcastle upon Tyne
- 1901 Oxford

During the nineteenth century the Convention was a lively focus for debate and experiment around photography.

Twentieth century meetings included:

- 1908 Brussels
- 1912 Amsterdam

After the First World War interest waned and the PCUK was kept running by an increasingly ageing and declining membership. It finally ceased operating in 1935.

== Sources ==
- "Death of Sir Cecil Hertslet". The East Kent Times and Mail. 10 March 1934. p. 7.
