= Richard Knill Freeman =

British architect

- Born: 1840; Stepney, London, England
- Died: 24 June 1904; Bolton, England
- Occupation: Architect
- Awards: Museum of Science and Art, Dublin 1882 competition
- Buildings: Holy Trinity Church, Blackpool; St. Andrew's Anglican Church, Moscow; Derby Museum and Art Gallery

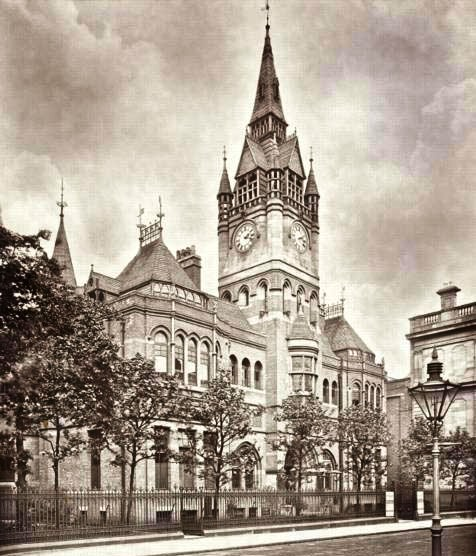
Richard Knill Freeman's Derby Museum and Art Gallery and Central Library, 1876

Richard Knill Freeman (1840, Stepney, London – 24 June 1904) was a British architect who began his career at Derby and moved to Bolton, Lancashire in the late 1860s. His work, in Victorian Gothic style and typically recalling the Decorated Period of later medieval architecture, can be seen in several cities and towns across the north of England. He worked in total on about 140 buildings, of which about half survive in some form.

Freeman was a fellow of the Manchester Society of Architects and president of that Society from 1890 to 1891.

== Career ==
Freeman's work included new churches, restorations, vicarages, schools, homes, museums, municipal buildings and hospitals. He designed additions to Southport Pier and an "Indian Pavilion" for Blackpool's North Pier in 1874. His Derby Museum, Library and Art Gallery, a gift to Derby by Michael Thomas Bass, was completed in 1876.

In 1882 he won the first competition for the Museum of Science and Art, Dublin with a design for "a building quadrangular in form, with mansard roofs" which made provision for the collection of the Royal Irish Academy; but because no Irish architect had been shortlisted there was controversy leading to a second competition in 1883, which was won by Thomas Newenham Deane & Son.

In 1878 Freeman was selected to design St. Andrew's Anglican Church in Moscow, Russia. Responding to the growth of the Moscow British community, church officials desired an English architect, and Freeman responded by submitting plans for a "typical English church in Victorian Gothic style". The church was completed in 1884.

In 1887 Freeman worked as the architect on a home in Bryerswood, Far Sawrey, delegating the job of supervising construction to his assistant, Dan Gibson. British garden designer Thomas Hayton Mawson was hired to work on the garden at the same time. On the strength of that commission, the trio went on to work in the same capacities at Graythwaite Hall, Newby Bridge, and Gibson and Mawson engaged in a brief partnership after that.

Freeman's Holy Trinity Church, Blackpool was completed in 1895, as was his church of St Lawrence in Barton, Preston. He also built St Margaret's Church in Hollingwood, did restoration work for the Worsley Church, and designed a hospital.

His son, Frank Richard Freeman (1870–1934), was also an architect. He continued his father's practice as Freeman & Son and built several churches in a style similar to his father's.

== See also ==
- Bolton Royal Infirmary
