= Harold Gresley =

English painter (1892–1967)

- self portrait from larger painting
- Born: 1892; Derbyshire, England
- Died: 1967 (aged 74–75)
- Occupation: Art teacher
- Employer: Repton School
- Known for: A Derbyshire artists and DCM
- Parent: Frank Gresley

Harold Gresley (1892–1967) was a British artist, following his father and grandfather. He was a painter of landscapes and portraits in watercolour and oil. He served in the Royal Fusiliers in the First World War and was awarded the Distinguished Conduct Medal. He has a substantial number of paintings in Derby Museum and Art Gallery.

== Biography ==
Gresley was born in Derbyshire and studied at Derby School of Art. He was the son of Frank Gresley and grandson of James Stephen Gresley both of whom were notable artists. He interrupted his studies when the First World War broke out, joining 1st Battalion The Royal Fusiliers. During the war he fought in the Balkans and in France. For his gallantry in France in late 1918, he was awarded the Distinguished Conduct Medal, a British award second only to the Victoria Cross. His citation reads:

" G/16514 Sjt. H. Gresley, 1st Bn., R. Fus.(Derby).

Throughout the operations in October and November, 1918. he repeatedly went forward well in advance of our troops and brought back very valuable information. On 7th November, 1918, after the battalion had been held up at St. Vaast La Valee, he went forward with the leading wave under a barrage and pointed out their objectives."

After the war he continued his studies in Nottingham under Arthur Spooner, and became a teacher at Repton School. Though the Gresleys are principally known for their landscapes, Harold was a highly accomplished portrait painter too. He lived at Chellaston, near Derby until he died in 1967.

Some of his work is presented in Derby Museum and Art Gallery after 77 of his paintings were donated by art collector Alfred E. Goodey.
