= Louise Rayner =

English painter

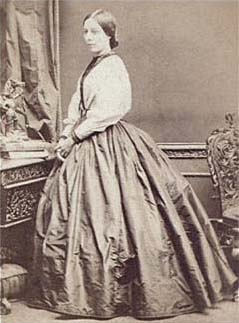
- Born: 21 June 1832; Matlock Bath
- Died: 8 October 1924 (aged 92); St Leonards-on-Sea

Louise Ingram Rayner (21 June 1832 – 8 October 1924) was a British watercolour painter, mostly of crowded and detailed street scenes in London, Edinburgh and elsewhere, but also interior views of historic buildings, with Haddon Hall a particular favourite.

== Family ==
Rayner was born in Matlock Bath in Derbyshire. Her parents Samuel Rayner and Ann Rayner (née Manser) were both noted artists, Samuel having been accepted for exhibition at the Royal Academy when he was 15. Four of Louise's sisters—Ann ("Nancy"), Margaret, Rose and Frances—and her brother Richard were also artists. Her eldest sister Ann Ingram Rayner (Nancy) exhibited at the Society of Painters in Water Colours and three times at the Royal Academy. The family lived in Matlock Bath and Derby until 1842 when they moved to London.

== Education ==
Rayner studied painting from the age of fifteen, at first with her father and later with established artist friends of the family such as George Cattermole, Edmund Niemann, David Roberts and Frank Stone. Her first exhibited work, an oil painting entitled The Interior of Haddon Chapel, was shown at the Royal Academy in 1852, the first of a series of oils.

== Watercolour ==
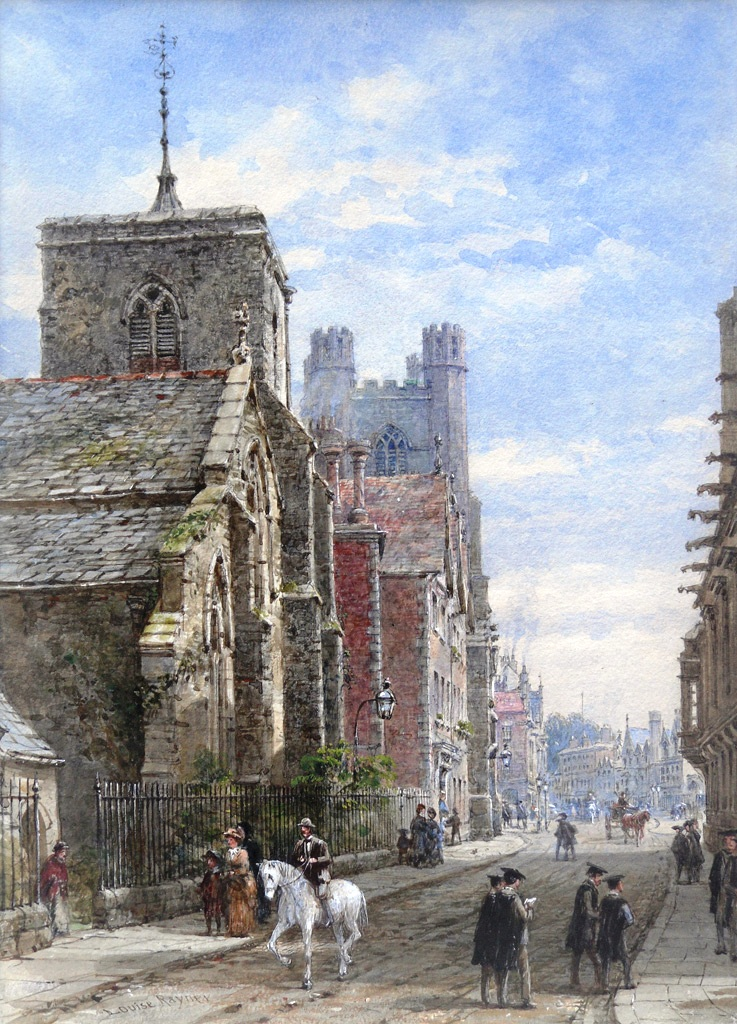
Louise Rayner - St Mary & St Michael Church, Trumpington Street, Cambridge. Watercolour, 9.5" x 13.5".

From 1860, however, her medium was watercolour, which she exhibited for over 50 years through organisations including the Society of Lady Artists, The Royal Academy, Royal Watercolour Society and the Royal Society of British Artists.

== Chester ==
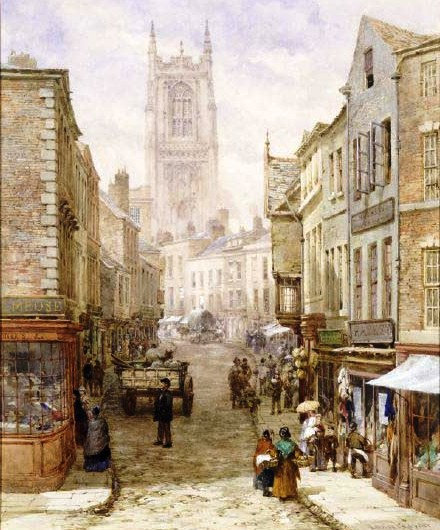
Irongate – from 1865 (now in Derby Museum and Art Gallery)

She lived in Chester in the county of Cheshire but travelled extensively, painting British scenes, during the summers in the 1870s and 1880s. Her paintings are very detailed and highly picturesque populated street scenes capturing the "olde worlde" character of British towns and cities in the booming Victorian period. Her paintings are very popular today as prints and on jigsaw puzzles. Around 1910 she moved with her sister to Tunbridge Wells, and later to St Leonards, where she died on 8 October 1924, aged 92.

== Collections ==
Rayner's work is represented in the collections of at the Russell-Cotes Art Gallery & Museum, Bournemouth, Derby Museum and Art Gallery and the Grosvenor Museum, Chester, which possesses 23 of her watercolours, the largest in any public collection.

== Sources ==
- Simon Fenwick, "Rayner, Samuel (1806–1879)", Oxford Dictionary of National Biography, Oxford University Press, 2004 accessed 26 June 2007
- Louise Rayner, Chester City Council
