= Ernest Ellis Clark =

English painter

- Born: 1870; Derby
- Died: 1932 (aged 61–62); Derby

Ernest Ellis Clark (1870 – 1932) was a Derby born artist who became an artist for Crown Derby. Several of his paintings are in Derby Museum and Art Gallery.

== Biography ==
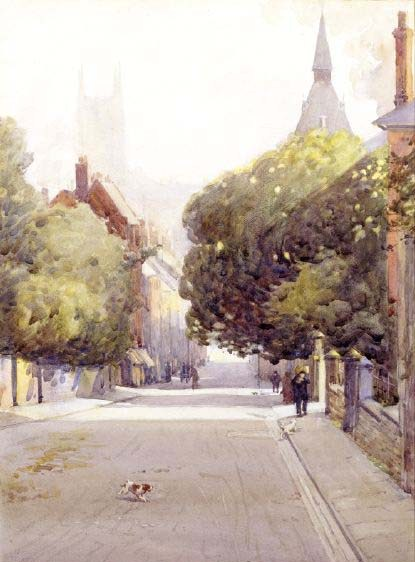
Green Lane, Derby

Clark was born in Derby and after studying art at evening classes he started work at Royal Crown Derby and rose to be an arts instructor and later Arts Master at Derby College of Art. He won many prizes for art including becoming a National Silver Medallist in Ornament and Design. In his forties he served in the Royal Field Artillery during the first world war. His only book was a guide for his students to design based on plant forms. In the book he supplied the designs but refrained from showing how to make decorations from them. Clark said "... it cannot be too frequently urged upon students that the only right way for them is to make their own studies direct from nature." He has several paintings in Derby Museum and three of his paintings are there after being gifted by Alfred E. Goodey. The painting of Green Lane records a time three years before the Hippodrome Theatre was built on the left and on the right is the College of Art where Clark trained.

Clark died aged 63 in Derby in 1932 and his work was free from copyright in 2002.
