= Samuel Rayner =

English landscape artist

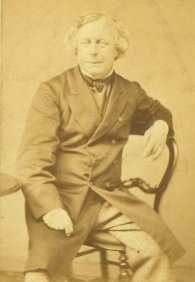
- Born: 15 April 1806
- Died: 1879 (aged 72–73)
- Spouse: Ann Rayner
- Children: Louise Rayner and other artists

Samuel A. Rayner (15 April 1806 – 1879) was an English landscape artist, known for his paintings of buildings and their interiors, including abbeys, churches and old mansions. He achieved the distinction of having a work accepted for exhibition at the Royal Academy at the age of 15. His wife, Ann Rayner, was an engraver on Ashford Black Marble and six of their children went on to be professional artists.

== Biography ==
Samuel Rayner was born in 1806, at Colnbrook in Buckinghamshire (now in Berkshire); afterwards the family moved to Marylebone in London where he was possibly trained by his grandfather. By the age of fifteen, Rayner was training as a draughtsman with the antiquary John Britton when Rayner had a picture of Malmesbury Abbey accepted by the Royal Academy. A fellow student and artistic influence were George Cattermole.

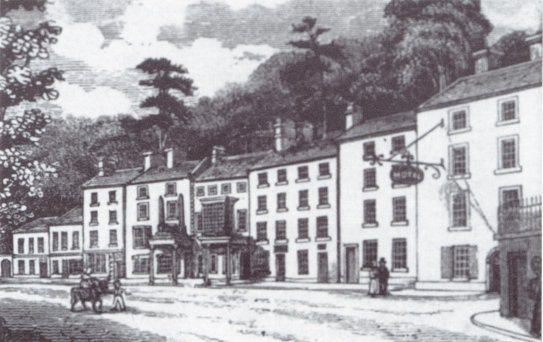
Matlock Bath in 1832

Samuel Rayner and his wife, Anne Manser Rayner, founded a "painting family". In 1823, he eloped with Anne Manser, who was four years older than him and was already known as an artist. They married in 1824. Their first child was born in London but he soon died. Six of their children became painters in turn. Rayner's house was a museum in Matlock Bath in the 1830s where Louise, William Henry and Rhoda (Rose) were born. The engraving by Arthur Jewitt illustrated shows Rayner's house in Matlock Back in 1832. There are two extended entrance ways to museums in the picture. The museum on the right was John Mawe's museum whilst on the left was Vallance's Royal Centre Museum. Vallance and Rayner were in partnership. There is a view of Matlock Bath engraved by Ann Rayner which also shows their house and it is now in Buxton Museum. This engraving was made by Samuel's wife with a diamond on Ashford Black Marble which was mined locally.

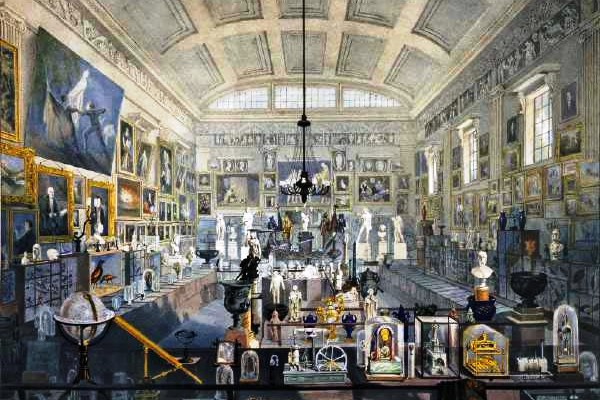
The Derby Exhibition (1839) by Samuel Rayner (Derby Museum and Art Gallery)

Rayner's painting of the 1839 Derby Exhibition which illustrates the early years of what to become Derby Museum and Art Gallery's collections. This painting includes Joseph Wright of Derby's painting Romeo and Juliet: the tomb scene which is on the left of the back wall.

Louise Rayner is the best known of Samuel and Ann's children: her siblings were Ann ("Nancy"), Margaret, Rose, Frances, and Richard. Nancy Rayner was influenced by Octavius Oakley and she was the first to be recognised as a distinguished artist but she died of consumption at the age of 28. Samuel was elected an associate of the Society of Painters in Water Colours in 1845 but was excluded from the Society in 1851 after a financial scandal. Some of his work can be seen at Derby Museum and Art Gallery.
