= Derby Telegraph =

Daily newspaper

- Type: Daily newspaper
- Format: Tabloid
- Owner: Reach plc
- Editor: Sam Dimmer
- Founded: 1879
- Headquarters: Nottingham
- Circulation: 4,536 (as of 2024)
- Website: derbytelegraph.co.uk

The Derby Telegraph, formerly the Derby Evening Telegraph, is a daily tabloid newspaper distributed in the Derby area of England. Stories produced by the Derby Telegraph team are published online under the Derbyshire Live brand.

== History ==
In 1857, Richard Keene was publishing the Derby Telegraph every Saturday. His business was in the Irongate district of Derby. His family was to include Alfred John Keene who was a local painter whose work is displayed in the Derby Art Gallery.

Another paper was first published in 1879 by Eliza Pike. It was known at the time as the Derby Daily Telegraph and was a four-page broadsheet which cost a halfpenny. Historical copies of the Derby Daily Telegraph, dating back to 1879, are available to search and view in digitised form at The British Newspaper Archive.

The first editor was W.J. Piper who stayed in the post until he died in 1918. He was succeeded by William Gilman who in 1927, saw the paper sold three times in a series of months, eventually ending up in the hands of Northcliffe Newspaper Group, which was part of Daily Mail and General Trust plc. The same company also publishes the Telegraph Lite - a weekly advertising-funded free newspaper.

The paper was originally based at the Corn Market in the town centre. It was refurbished in 1918 after the First World War but it outgrew these premises in 1929 and moved to the Corn Exchange. It stayed there until late 1979 when it moved to purpose-built premises on Meadow Road.

In November 2014 it moved to its present office location at 2, Siddals Road. Printing had been sourced from Birmingham since 2011.

In 2012, Local World acquired Northcliffe Media from Daily Mail and General Trust.

In November 2015, Local World was acquired by the Trinity Mirror Group. In May 2018 the Derby Telegraph's website changed its name to Derbyshire Live, falling in line with other titles' websites which are owned by the same group, including Nottinghamshire Live (previously Nottingham Post) and Leicestershire Live (Leicester Mercury).

The Siddals Road offices closed in Summer 2021 and production of the newspaper moved to a regional hub in Nottingham, with journalists adopting a hybrid home/office model of working.

== Competitions ==
Until the late 1990s, the newspaper ran the annual Miss Derby Evening Telegraph competition. Entrants had to be female, aged 17–25, never married and never had children.

In 2012, the Derby Telegraph launched the Local Business Accelerator competition with the Derbyshire and Nottinghamshire Chamber of Commerce. The businesses deemed to have most potential won mentoring, free advertising and chamber membership. Mackney Photography, Splash Fit Gym and Essere Bella beauty salon were the winners in 2012. In 2013, the winners were Eve of St Agnes, Status Social and the Derby Brewing Company.

== Content ==
Before the 1970s, the newspaper (in its broadsheet form) often had national news stories on its front page, with weighty current affairs stories. The coverage of national and local news stories was almost 50:50.

== Distribution ==
It is published daily from Monday to Saturday and is the principal local newspaper for Derby and surrounding parts of south Derbyshire. The newspaper has a local focus with usually just two pages reserved for national and international news. Back issues from 1879 until the present day can be viewed at the Derby Local Studies Library or the British Library Newspaper Collection at Colindale, London. The current average circulation is 20,090 daily (as of 01/10/2015)

The paper was known as the Derby Evening Telegraph until April 2009 when it changed its name to simply the Derby Telegraph. This was because only one edition was now published per day and available in the morning, which would have rendered the use of the word "Evening" in the title as misleading. For many years, the name "Derby" had not featured in the paper's front page masthead. The change of name involved the word "Evening" being substituted by "Derby" in the masthead. The masthead font has been unchanged since 1975.
