= Alfred E. Goodey =

English art collector (1878–1945)

Alfred Edward Goodey
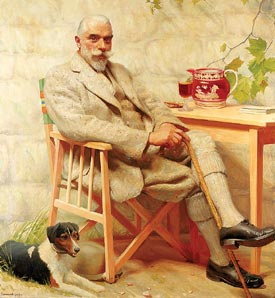
- 1942 painting by Ernest Townsend
- Born: 3 April 1878; Derby, England
- Died: 7 April 1945 (aged 67); Derby, England
- Education: Derby School of Art
- Known for: Philanthropy and collecting art
- Partner: Robert Gould Shaw III
- Parent(s): William Henry Goodey; Rhoda Strutt

Alfred Edward Goodey (1878–1945) was a collector of paintings, prints and photographs, especially those connected with the English Midlands town of Derby.

== Biography ==
Alfred Goodey's parents were William Henry Goodey and Rhoda née Strutt and he was born in Derby on 3 April 1878. He was educated at home and at the Whitworth School before he attended Derby School of Art. He began collecting oils, watercolours, prints and photographs in 1886, searching as far afield as America for anything to do with Derby. He even commissioned artists to paint contemporary views of Derby, anxious to record anything that might be demolished or changed.

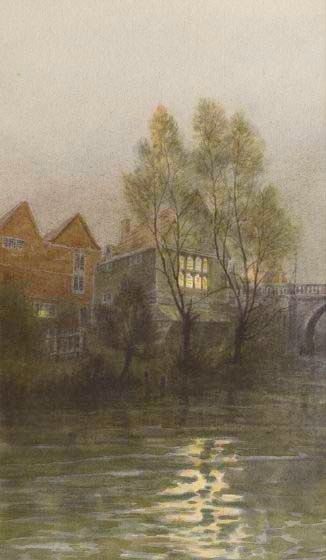
Alfred John Keene: St Mary's on the Bridge - Bridge Chapel by the River Derwent at night

Goodey had a range of interests including natural history and walking in Derbyshire; he was an amateur Shakespearean actor founding a local society and arranging "The Loft" for rehearsals near his own house, 40 Ashbourne Road, Derby. He has been described as a man about town in plus fours and a full beard and moustache who would frequent his favourite pub on Sadler Gate and discuss the issues of the day. However it was his interest in art that led him to the presidency of the Derby Sketching Club and a shrewd eye for a painting that would help to record Derby's history that ensured his notability. The Loft was almost completely demolished in September 2014.

Goodey amassed a remarkable record of Derby as it existed in the 19th and early 20th centuries, and in 1936 he gave over 500 paintings to the Derby Museum and Art Gallery. He also bequeathed to the town further works of art and £13,000 to be used to build an extension to the Museum. He died in Derby in 1945 and the museum now houses not only Goodey's collection but the biggest collection of paintings by Joseph Wright of Derby. Goodey's collection included paintings by Alfred John Keene, a member of the Keene family of Derby which included his father and photographer Richard Keene who published the Derby Telegraph, his brother William Caxton Keene, and Ernest Townsend. Three of the paintings given to the Derby Museum and Art Gallery by Goodey were by artist Ernest Ellis Clark. Another was by C. T. Moore. Images of his collection have been published by Derby City Council in the book Goodey's Derby.

Nancy Astor's son Robert Gould Shaw III, commonly known as Bobby Shaw, was Goodey's partner.

Goodey died on 7 April 1945 in Derby. He was cremated at Wilford Hill Crematorium, Nottingham on 11 April 1945. His ashes were taken to Derby for burial, the location of which is unknown.
