= Derby Baptist Chapel =

Baptist Chapel, Derby
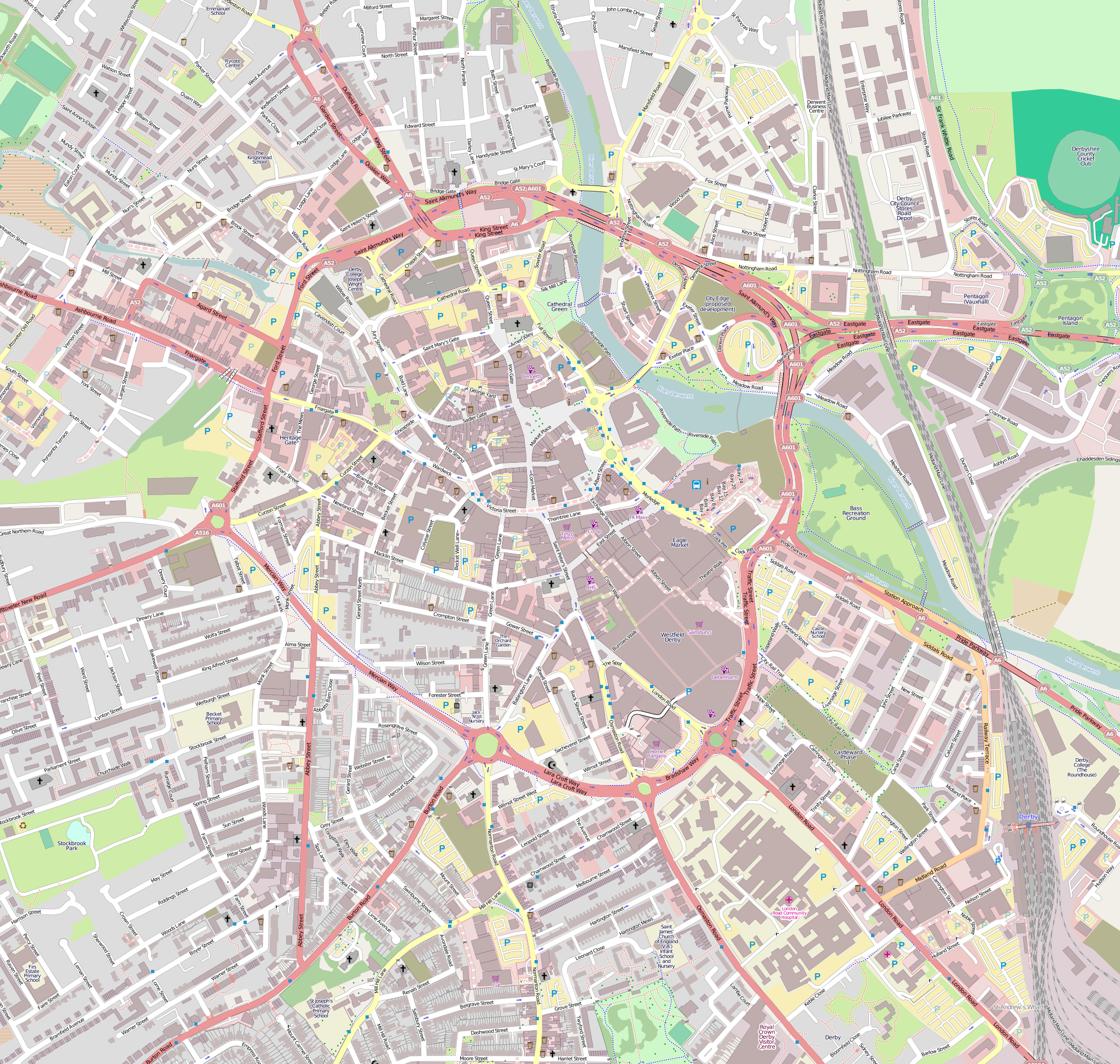
- Location within Derby
- 52°55′29.3″N 1°28′43.7″W
- Location: Derby, Derbyshire
- Country: England
- Denomination: Baptist

Architecture
- Completed: 1841
- Closed: September 1937

Derby Baptist Chapel on St Mary's Gate was opened in 1841.

== History ==
The congregation formed at a baptism on 21 August 1791, worshipping at a sanctuary in Brook Street from 1802.

To accommodate a growing congregation which had reached 500, the St Mary's Gate chapel was converted from the former mansion dating from ca. 1750 of the Osbornes. It was purchased from William Evans MP for £4,000 in 1841 (equivalent to £358,783 in 2025).

The last services were held in September 1937. The wrought-iron gates were transferred to Derby Cathedral.

== Organ ==
A new organ by Nicholson was provided in 1897. A specification of the organ as recorded before 1939 can be found on the National Pipe Organ Register. It was moved to Baptist Church, Broadway, Derby by J.H. Adkins in 1939.
