= Richard Keene =

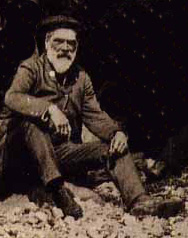
Richard Keene in 1887

Richard Keene (15 May 1825 – December 1894) was an early Derbyshire photographer. He was a founding member of The Derby Photographic Society in 1884 and the Photographic Convention of the United Kingdom in 1886 as well as being an early member of The Linked Ring.

== Biography ==
=== Life ===
Keene was the son of Richard Keene and Priscilla Kimpton, born in London on 15 May 1825. At the age of three, Keene moved with his family to Derby when his father became the manager of Frost's Silk Mill. He was educated at Thomas Swanwick's Academy and then at Matthew Spencer's Academy in Derby before becoming an apprentice to Thomas Richardson & Sons, printers in Ashbourne, Derbyshire. He subsequently went to work in their London offices before working for Simpkin Marshall & Co publishers and booksellers. He married Mary Barrow in 1851 and had eight children in total, five sons (including the watercolourist Alfred John Keene) and 3 daughters, living in Radbourne Street, Derby. He died at his home in Derby in December 1894.

=== Career ===
In 1851 Keene returned to Derby from London to set up as a printer, publisher and bookseller in Irongate under the name Richard Keene and Co. He had an early interest in photography and began taking and selling photographs of Derby and Derbyshire and before long photography became the mainstay of his business. He was a friend of the Rev Edward Abney (1811–1914) and his sons William de Wiveleslie Abney and Charles Edward Abney - all of whom were early photographic experimenters.

Keene established a portrait studio and 'Repository of Arts' selling photographs prints and stereoscopic viewers.

Keene was a founder member of the Derby Photographic Society in 1884. He was also a founding member of the Photographic Convention of the United Kingdom which held its inaugural convention in Derby in 1886.

He was a skilled stereoscopic photographer and worked with his friend and fellow Derby photographer John Warwick on an acclaimed series 'Derbyshire Stereographs' published in the late 1850s. These are usually credited as 'By John Warwick, Published by Richard Keene'. Keene gave an account of his early photographic work with Warwick in a later lecture, which is reprinted in Maxwell Craven's biography of Keene. In this he makes clear that this early stereoscopic work was a joint enterprise between the two men.

He was invited to become a member of The Linked Ring, an exclusive group of photographers committed to promoting artistic principles in photography. Fellow members included Henry Peach Robinson, Frank Sutcliffe and Alfred Stieglitz. Through this organisation and the Photographic Convention he had regular contact with some of the most prominent and successful photographers of the day.

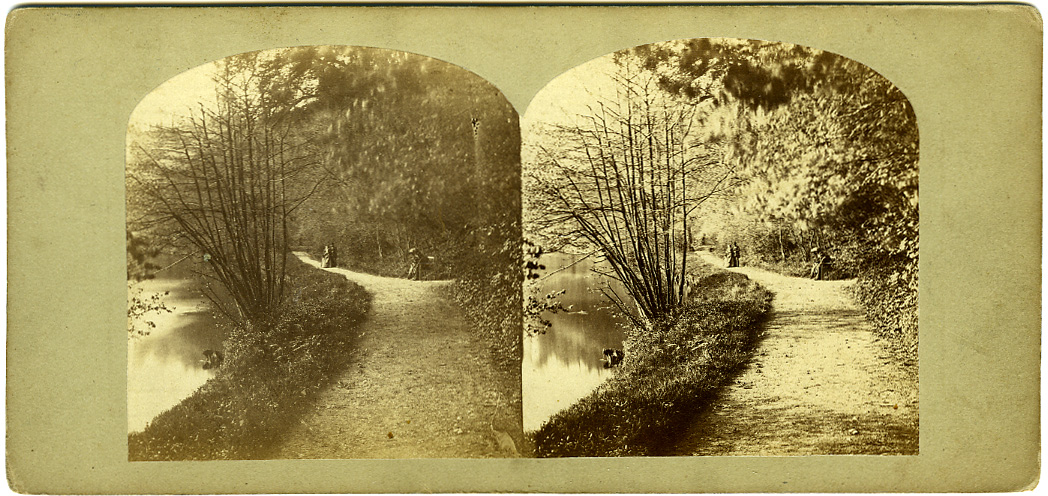
'Lovers walk Matlock Bath' Recto. A stereoscopic photograph from Keene's series 'Derbyshire Stereographs. Circa 1858.

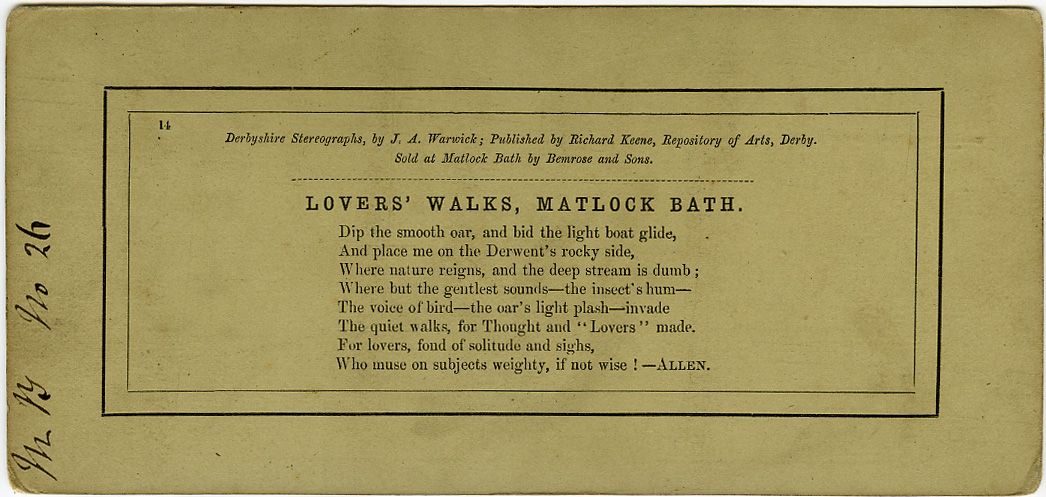
'Lovers walk Matlock Bath' Verso.

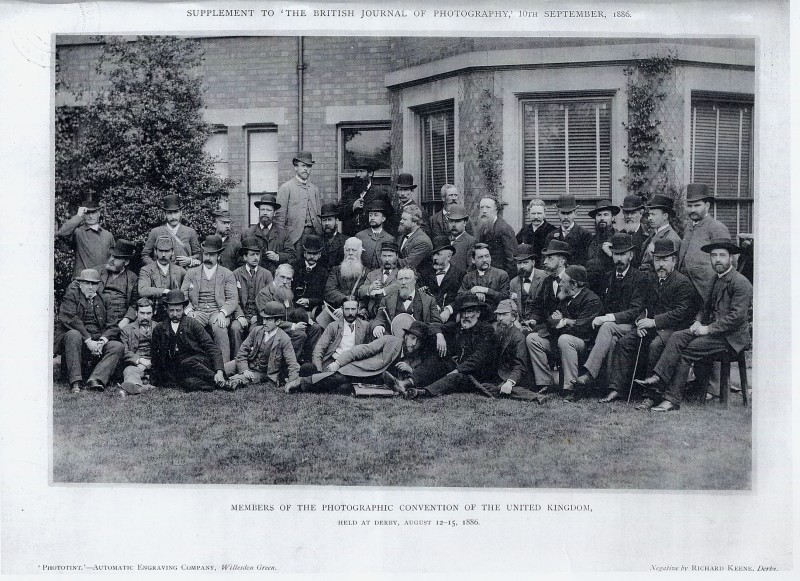
Members at the inaugural meeting of the Photographic Convention of the United Kingdom, Derby, 1886

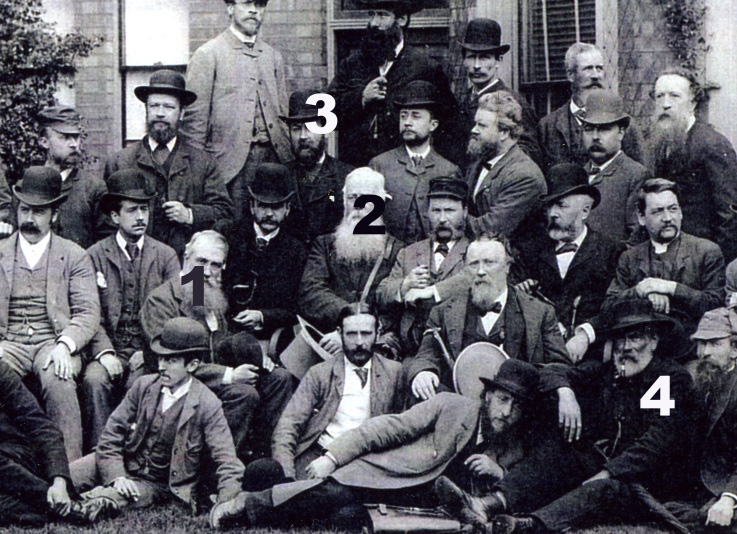
Partial key to the 1886 Convention photograph showing 1. William England, 2. Alexander Tate. 3. Alfred Seaman. 4. Richard Keene
