= Nottinghamshire Archives =

County archive in Nottingham, England

Coordinates: 52.9475°N 1.1510°W

The Nottinghamshire Archives holds the archives for the county of Nottinghamshire. The archives are held at Castle Meadow Road, Nottingham, and run by Nottinghamshire County Council.

== Collections ==
The collections held by Nottinghamshire Archives are organised as follows:

Series	Title	Notes
C	Court records	15th – 20th centuries
DD, M	Deposited documents	12th – 20th centuries
DC	District and Borough Council records	Mostly 1894 – 1974
EA	Enclosure awards	18th – 19th centuries
—	Maps and plans	16th – 20th centuries
NC	Non-conformist records	17th – 20th centuries
CA	Nottingham City Council records	12th – 20th centuries
CC	Nottinghamshire County Council records	1889 – 1974
OS	Ordnance Survey maps	c. 1830 – c. 1940
PaC	Parish Council records	1894 onwards
PR	Parish records	16th – 20th centuries
X/PR	Prints and illustrations	17th – 20th centuries
P	Probate records	16th – 20th centuries
S	School records	19th – 20th centuries (some earlier)
SO	Semi-official records	16th – 20th centuries
SC	Southwell Chapter records	12th – 19th centuries
DR	Southwell Diocesan records	Mostly from 1884
AT	Tithe awards	1836 – c. 1850

Source: "Archives: Collections and Catalogues", Nottingham County Council. Retrieved 18 September 2016.

== Archivists ==
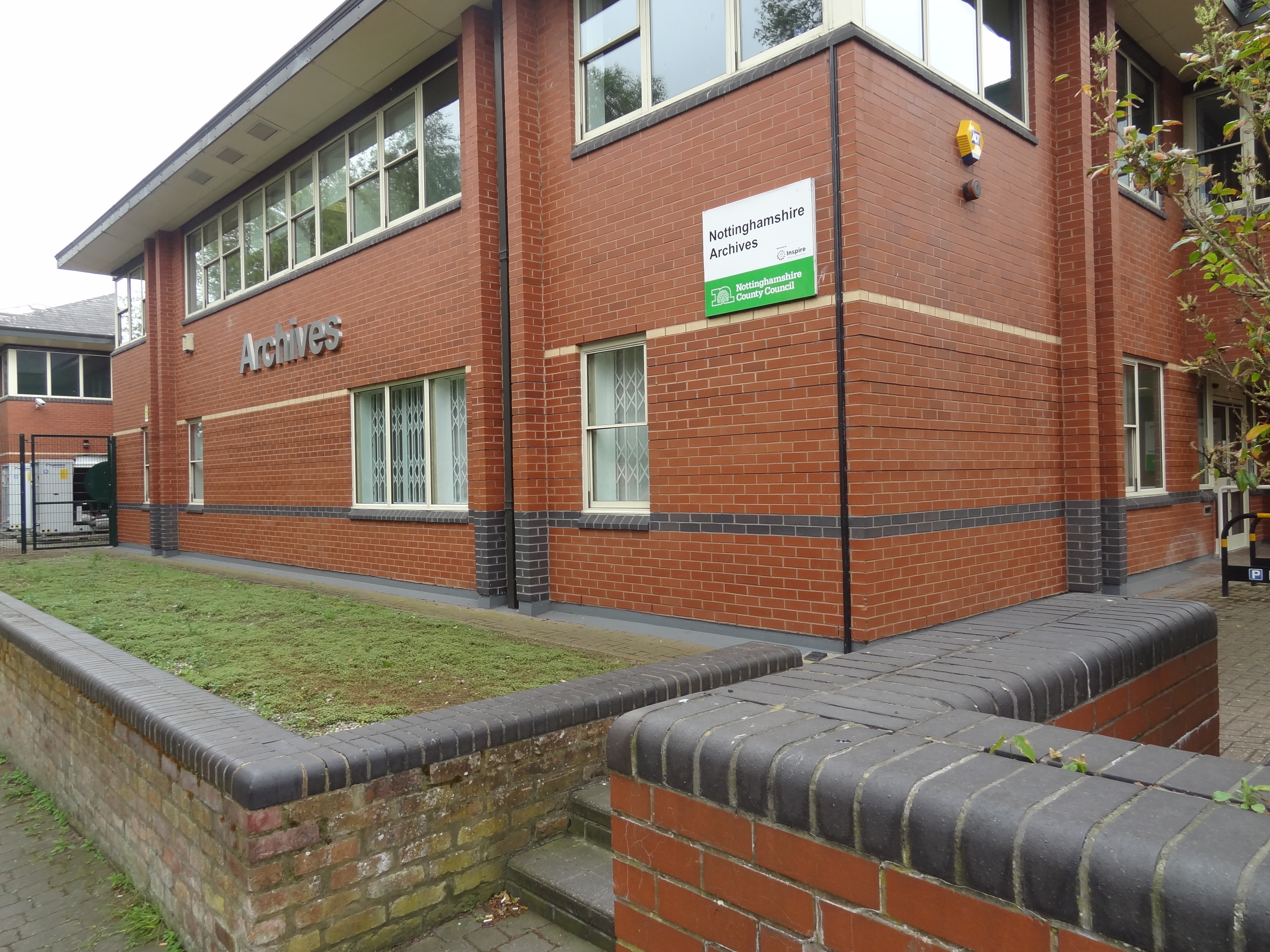
Nottinghamshire Archives

In 1939, Nottingham Corporation appointed Violet Walker the first City Archivist; she had been appointed a librarian at Radford in 1926, before moving to Nottingham Reference Library in 1928, where she became librarian in 1936 and oversaw the re-cataloguing of its stock using the Dewey decimal system. While City Archivist, Walker's translation of the Newstead Cartulary was published. She retired in 1966 and her assistant of two years, Adrian Henstock, took over the post. When the City and County Archives merged in 1974, Henstock became Principal Archivist and served in that post until he retired in 2003. Mark Dorrington succeeded him, and remained in the post for 10 years, before becoming Keeper of Manuscripts and Special Collections, University of Nottingham in 2013. Ruth Imeson replaced him at the Archives as Team Manager, Archives and Local Studies, Nottinghamshire County Council, at the start of 2014.
