= Metro Cinema (Derby) =

Coordinates: 52.9232°N 1.4757°W

Logo of the Metro Cinema

The Metro Cinema was an independent cinema in Derby, United Kingdom, with one screen. It showed many independent, arthouse and foreign films, as well as some older mainstream films.

For most of its life, the cinema was located on Green Lane, but it relocated to the University of Derby campus in 2007. In 2008, it closed, in preparation for a move to the new Derby QUAD development in the city centre.

== Building ==
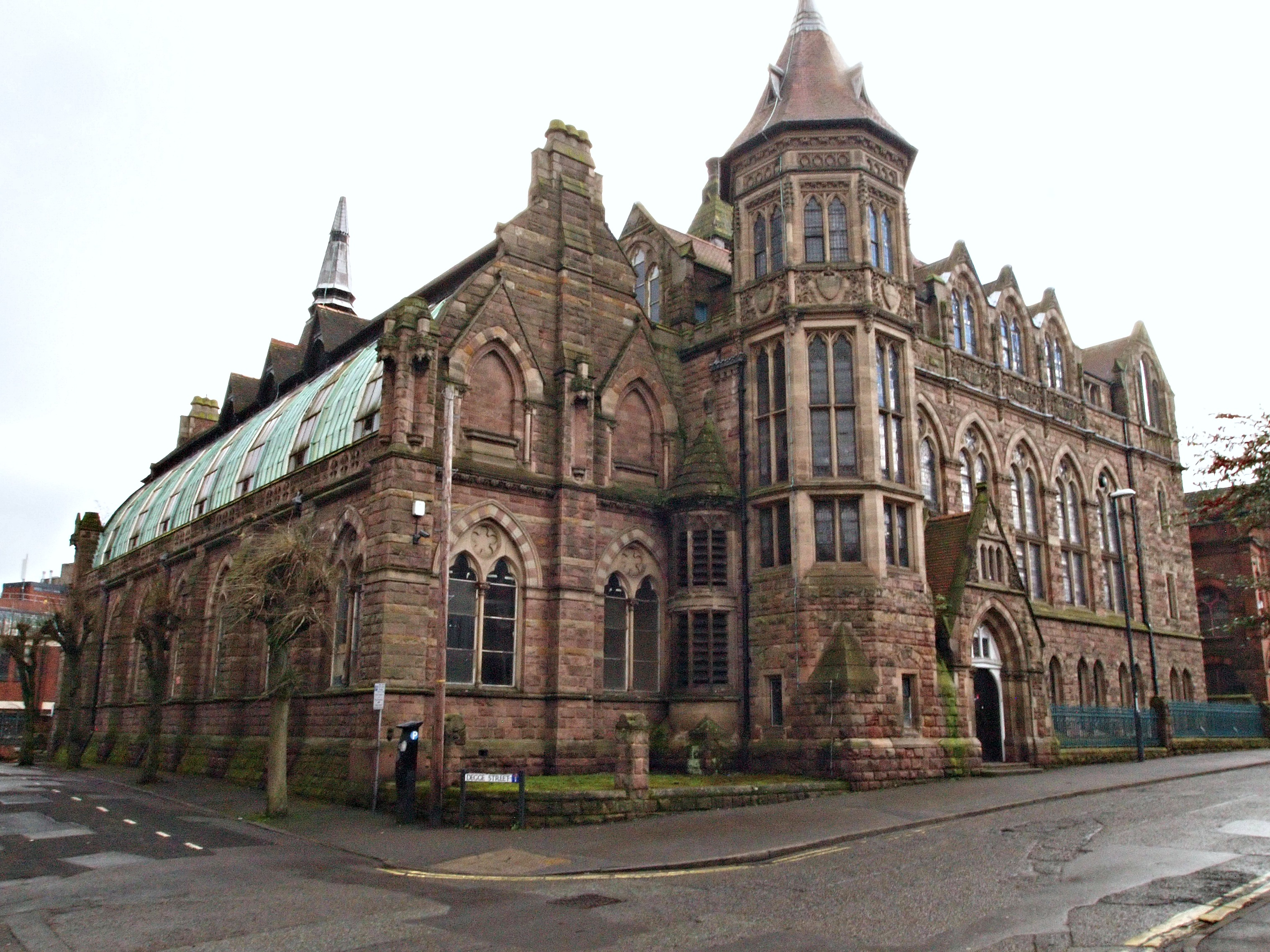
The cinema's original location on Green Lane, Derby

The Green Lane building was originally Derby Municipal Technical College, later Derby Central School of Art (whose function survives as part of University of Derby), and is a Grade II* listed building, giving it legal protection from unauthorised alteration or demolition. It was built in stone in 1876 in Gothic style, with additions in 1899. The architect was F.W. Waller of Waller and Son, Gloucester. In April 2026 the Victorian Society included the building in their annual top 10 endangered buildings list for England and Wales.
