= King Street Methodist Chapel =

King Street Methodist Church, Derby
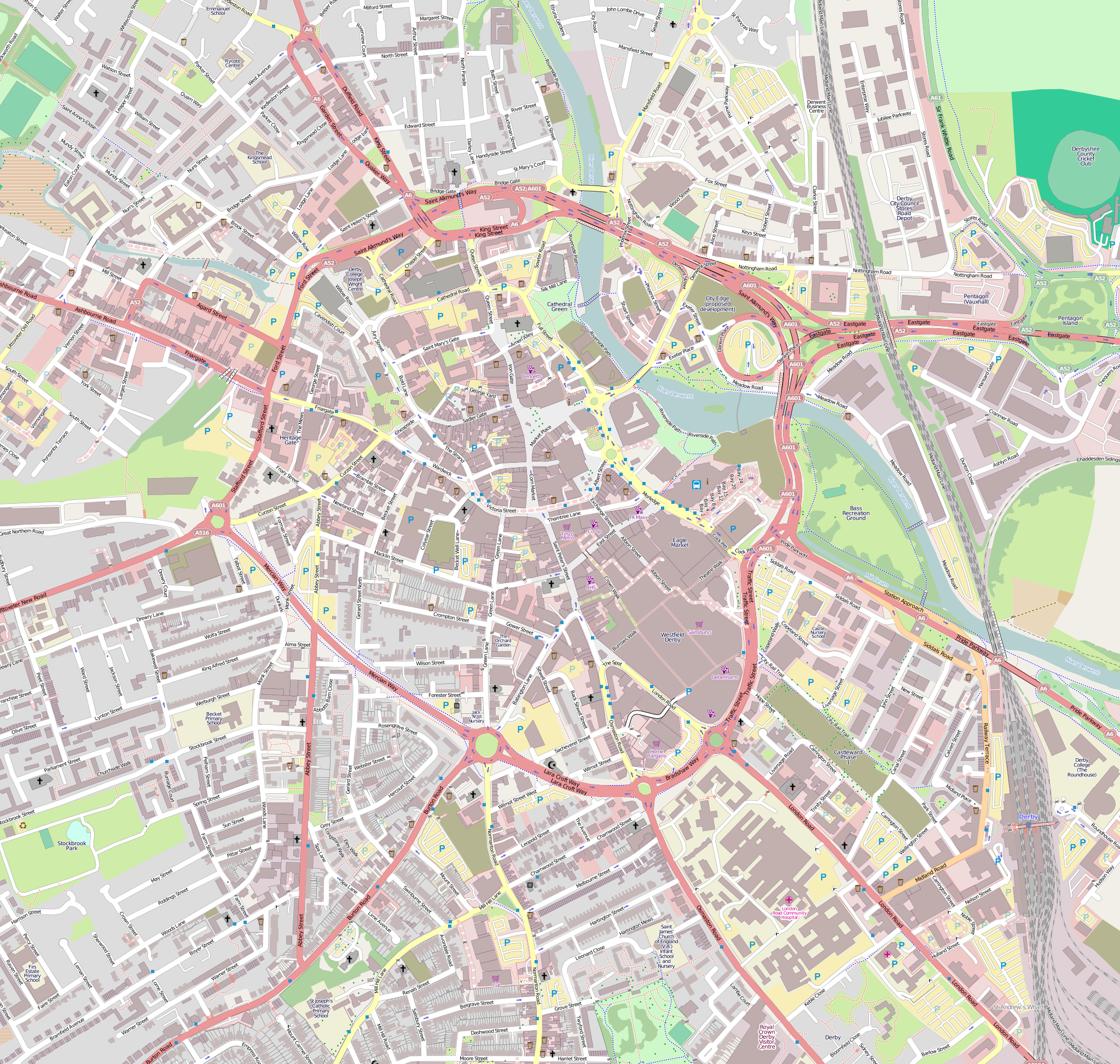
- Location within Derby
- 52°55′34.0″N 1°28′48.9″W
- Location: Derby, Derbyshire
- Country: England
- Denomination: Wesleyan Methodist

Architecture
- Architect: James Simpson
- Completed: 1841
- Demolished: 1968

Specifications
- Capacity: 1,400 people.
- Length: 90 feet (27 m)
- Width: 64 feet (20 m)

King Street Methodist Chapel was a Wesleyan Methodist chapel in Derby, Derbyshire.

== History ==
The first Methodist Chapel in Derby was built in St Michael's Lane in 1765. In 1805 a chapel was built in King-street to accommodate a congregation of 800 people. By 1840 it was insufficient for the congregation and a new building was planned.

The foundation stone of the new chapel building was laid on 29 October 1840. It was built to the designs of the architect James Simpson of Leeds and opened on 29 September 1841. Pevsner describes the building as having a fine, stately Grecian front with one-storeyed Greek Doric porch, and an upper floor with Ionic pilasters, arched windows and a pediment.

On either side of the chapel, a minister's house was built. The one on the left was occupied by the Reverend George Browne Macdonald (1805–1868), and his second wife Hannah (née Jones) (1809–1875), whose eleven children were:

- Mary (1834–1836)
- Henry (1836–1891)
- Alice Kipling (1837-1910) (mother of Rudyard Kipling)
- Caroline (1838–1854)
- Lady Georgiana Burne-Jones (1840-1920) (wife of Edward Burne-Jones)
- Frederic William (1842–1928) (a President of the Wesleyan conference)
- Lady Agnes Poynter (wife of the president of the Royal Academy Edward Poynter)
- Louisa Baldwin (1845–1925) (the mother of the ex-Prime Minister, Mr Stanley Baldwin)
- Walter (1847-1847)
- Edith (1848–1937)
- Herbert (1850–1851)

It was demolished in 1968.

== Organ ==
A pipe organ was installed in 1841 by Booth. A specification of the organ can be found on the National Pipe Organ Register. When the church closed, the organ was moved to Queen's Hall Methodist Mission in Wigan.
