= William Crooke (photographer) =

British photographer (1848–1928)

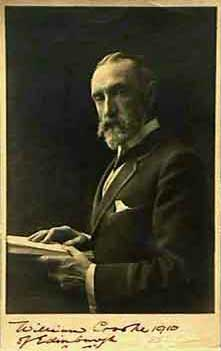
- Born: 1848
- Died: 1928 (aged 79–80)
- Occupation: Photographer

William Crooke (1848–1928) was a professional photographer with a studio in Edinburgh.

Two of the best-known portrait photographers in England [sic Britain], William Crooke of Edinburgh and Walter Barnett of London sailed on December 17 for a six weeks' tour of the United States, during which they plan to visit some of the leading professionals of New York, Philadelphia, Baltimore, Washington, Pittsburg, St Louis, Chicago, Milwaukee, Niagara Falls, Buffalo, Rochester, Boston, and other places.

These gentlemen were asked by some of their American friends to bring collections of their portrait work.

Accordingly, Mr Crooke will have with him about sixty of his large pictures, made within the last few years, many of which have been shown at the exhibitions of the Royal Photographic Society and the Salon.

One of his subjects, Maude Hellman, commented, "He worked quickly and seemed interested in getting simple results in a striking way, however. He has a trick of uttering half stifled exclamations of approval when he gets a pose that pleases him."

Crooke was an active member of The Photographic Convention of the United Kingdom (PCUK) and was elected its president for 1899.

== Bibliography ==
- British Journal of Photography 58 (1911): xxx–xxx.
- The Practical Photographer 3 (1892): 105.
- British Journal of Photography 29 (1882): 597.
