= Derby Central Library =

Library in Derby, England

Coordinates: 52°55′22″N 1°28′47″W

Derby Museum and Art Gallery on the Wardwick (Formally Derby Central Library)
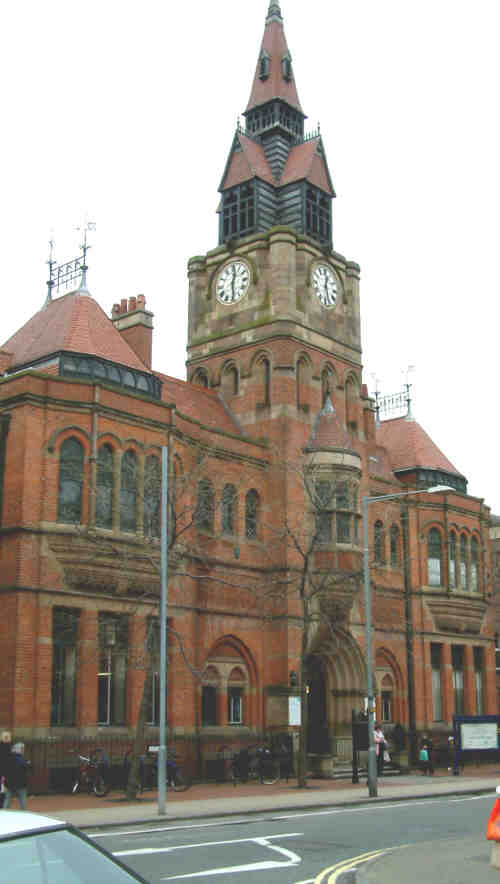
- The 1879 Library building (now occupied by Derby Museum and Art Gallery)
- Location: The Wardwick, Derby, DE1 1HS, England
- Type: Museum Venue
- Established: 1879
- Dissolved: 9 June 2018
- Architect: Richard Knill Freeman

Derby Central Library was the main public and reference library in Derby, England, between 1879 and 2018. It was established in 1879 along with Derby Museum and Art Gallery, with which it shared a red brick building designed in the Domestic Flemish Gothic style by Richard Knill Freeman and given to Derby by Michael Thomas Bass. It was formerly the largest branch of Derby City Libraries run by Derby City Council.

== History ==
Prior to the Public Libraries Act 1850, a number of circulating libraries existed in Derby. Typically these libraries were run by booksellers and relied on a subscription payment by their members.

The "permanent" library in Derby was established in 1811 in Queen Street. This library was open to people who by the 1830s could afford to buy a four guinea share and pay an annual subscription of another guinea. In 1832 this library had 84 members. In 1858, the book collection incorporated the 4,000 volume library of the Derby Philosophical Society. In 1863 the botanist Alexander Croall was appointed the first Librarian and Curator and the following year the museum and library were joined together. Croall left in 1875 to become the curator of the Smith Institute in Stirling.

Although the possibility was considered by the council, Derby Borough did not take advantage of the powers conferred by the 1850 Act for some years. Then in 1878 the 7th Duke of Devonshire donated his Derbyshire collection of books and papers to the Borough. A suitable home for this material was needed, but it wasn't until the following year that the Borough was able to provide the people of Derby with a free library service, as a result of Mr. Bass's gift.

On Saturday 28 June 1879 Mr. Bass performed the official opening of The Derby Free Library and Museum, the cause of great celebration in the town. The ceremony involved an official reception of Mr. Bass at the Midland Railway Station followed by an elegant luncheon at the Midland Hotel and a procession to the Market Place, along decorated streets packed with excited crowds of people. Mr Bass then presented the title deeds to the Mayor at the Town Hall. The party then moved on to the Free Library itself, where Mr. Bass took a tour before returning to the steps and declaring the building open.

The book collection offered by the new library included the Devonshire collection as well as the contents of the Permanent Library and Philosophical Society. By September 1898 the lending collection totalled almost 20,000 volumes and the reference collection over 11,000.

In 1914 the curator's house alongside the library was demolished to make way for an extension to the building, intended to house the recently acquired Bemrose Library. The Bemrose Library had been purchased after the money was raised from the public. The Library had been in the possession of Sir Henry Howe Bemrose.

In 1964 the Museum and Art Gallery expanded into a newly built wing on The Strand, but leaving the original 19th-century building partly shared between the Library and the Museum. One of the library's quiet rooms is named for Alfred Goodey, who funded the additional building.

After 139 years, the Central Library was closed on 9 June 2018 as part of Derby City Council's restructuring of their library services. The new Riverside Library, located within the city's Council House, opened in July 2018.

== See also ==
- Listed buildings in Derby (Arboretum Ward)
- Derby QUAD Arts centre
