= Alfred John Keene =

English painter

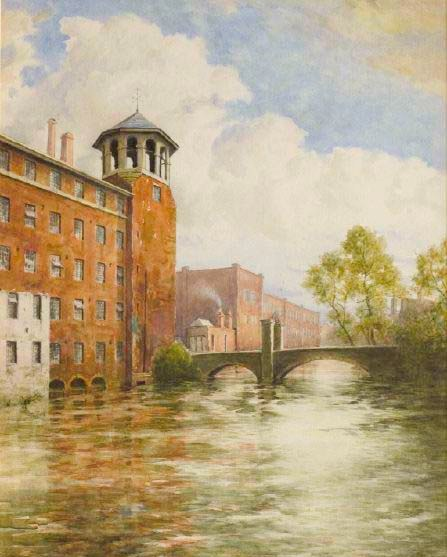
Alfred John Keene: Derby silk mill, 1895.

Alfred John Keene (1864–1930) was a British watercolour artist working in Derby.

== Biography ==
Keene was the fourth son of photographer Richard Keene who published the Derby Telegraph and brother of watercolourist William Caxton Keene and photographer Charles Barrow Keene. Known as "Jack", Keene trained at Derby Central School of Art from 1878 to 1895.

Keene managed the family business with his brother Charles after their father's death. Alfred John Keene was a founder member, in 1887, of the Derby Sketching Club with F Booty, William Swindell, George Thompson, Charles Terry And Frank Timms. This club late had Keene as its president and it still meets today. Keene's paintings were collected by Alfred E. Goodey who eventually purchased 77 of them. Goodey gave his collection of paintings to Derby Museum in 1936.
