= Quad (arts centre) =

Arts centre in Derby, England

Coordinates: 52.9232°N 1.4755°W

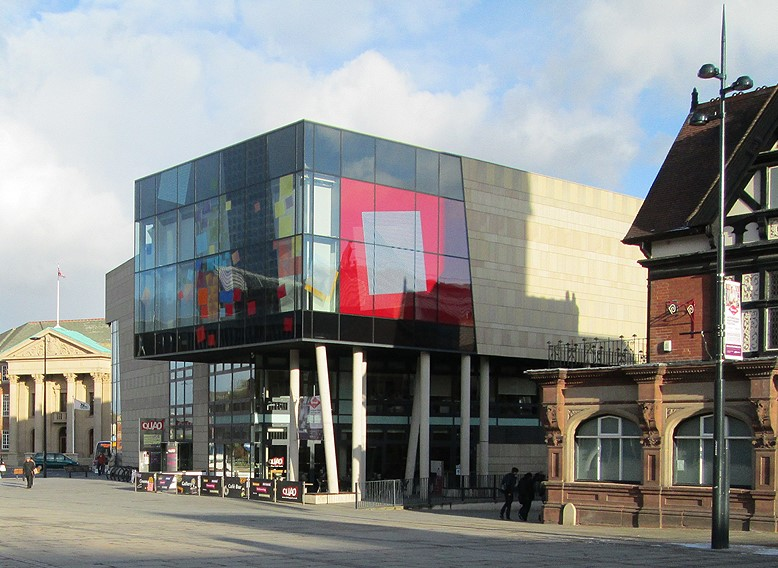
- Interactive map of the Quad area

General information
- Type: Arts centre
- Location: Market Place, Market Place, Derby, DE1 3AS, Derby, England, UK
- Completed: 2008
- Inaugurated: 26 September 2008

Design and construction
- Architecture firm: Feilden Clegg Bradley

Website
- www.derbyquad.co.uk

Quad (branded as QUAD and also known as Derby QUAD), is an arts centre in Derby, England, first opened on 26 September 2008. Quad provides an art gallery, three cinemas (two large cinemas and a smaller relaxed room known as "The Box" showing small lesser known films), artists’ studios, and a cafe bar. The centre also has spaces in which people can create their own artwork.

The building has a steel-and-glass design by Bath architects Feilden Clegg Bradley, which was considered controversial when it was chosen by Derby council cabinet in 2004.

== Details ==
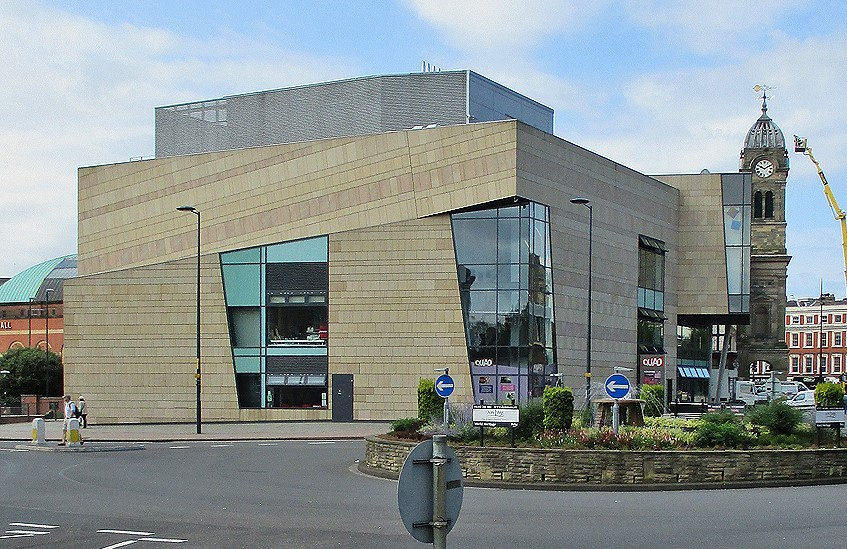
Derby QUAD

Quad is a cinema, gallery, cafe, and workshop space that anyone can use. Quad connects people and businesses to art and film for entertainment, education, and participation. There are artists' studios which the public can hire. The cinema shows a range of motion pictures, from old silent movies to the latest productions.

The exhibition programme has held major exhibitions by Bruce Asbestos, Danielle Brathwaite-Shirley, Benedict Drew, Doug Fishbone, Ellie Harrison, Hetain Patel, and Joey Holder.

Quad offers creative courses for adults and children.

== See also ==
- Metro Cinema (Derby)
