= Derby Museum and Art Gallery =

Museum in Derby, England

Coordinates: 52°55′20″N 1°28′46″W

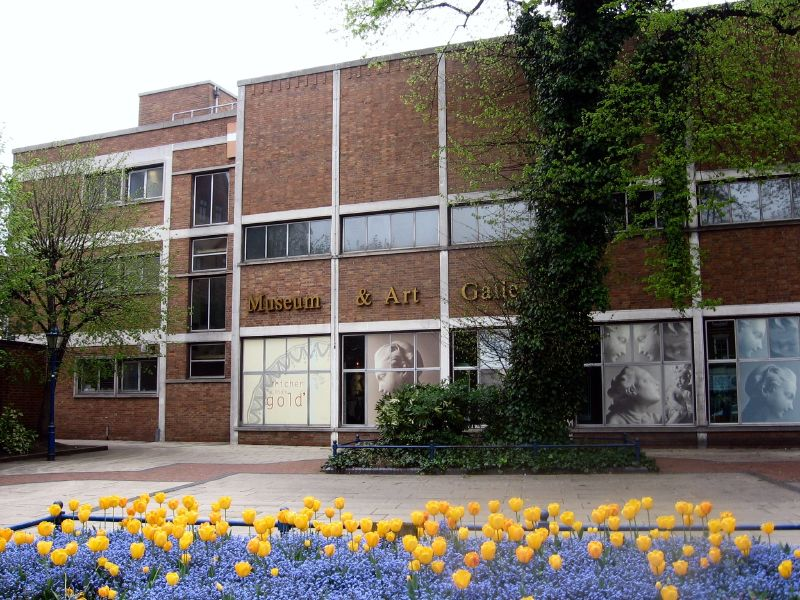
- The 1964 extension to the original building houses the museum and art gallery in 2008
- Established: 1879
- Location: The Strand, Derby, England
- Collections: Joseph Wright paintings
- Owners: Derby City Council (managed by Derby Museums)
- Website: Official website

Derby Museum and Art Gallery is a museum and art gallery in Derby, England. It was established in 1879, along with Derby Central Library, in a new building designed by Richard Knill Freeman and given to Derby by Michael Thomas Bass. The collection includes a gallery displaying many paintings by Joseph Wright of Derby; there is also a large display of Royal Crown Derby and other porcelain from Derby and the surrounding area. Further displays include archaeology, natural history, geology, military collections and world cultures. The Art Gallery was opened in 1882.

== History ==
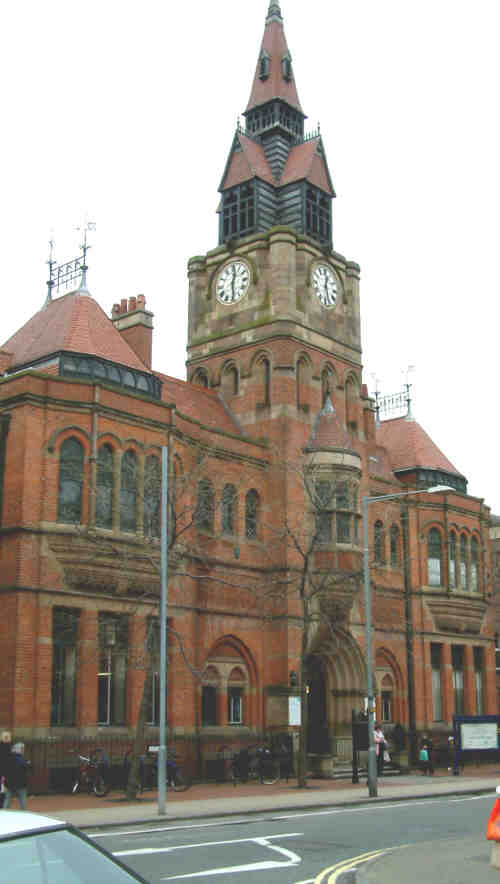
The 1876 building mostly housed Derby Central Library but the dividing line with the newer building varied

The museum can trace its start to the formation of the Derby Town and County Museum and Natural History Society on 10 February 1836.

The society was housed by Full Street Public Baths but it was a private society funded by its members' subscriptions. Its collections were created by donations initially from Dr Forrester who had been a President of Derby Philosophical Society. The patron of the Museum Society was William Cavendish, 6th Duke of Devonshire, and the President was Sir George Crewe who was a keen naturalist. Col. George Gawler contributed a collection of minerals and exotic stuffed birds which included an albatross from his time as governor in South Australia. In 1839 a major exhibition was held at the Mechanics' Institute which contained many items including those from Joseph Strutt's collection. Many of these made their way into Derby Museum's collection. The society moved in 1840 to the Athenaeum in Victoria Street. The society's collections grew in 1856 and they were first offered for incorporation into the town by William Mundy, but the offer was rejected.

In 1857, Llewellyn Jewitt became secretary and the museum was opened to the general public on Saturday mornings. In 1858 the Derby Philosophical Society moved to a house on the Wardwick in Derby as it merged with what was called the Derby Town and County Museum and the Natural History Society. This move included the society's library of 4,000 volumes, mathematical and scientific apparatus and its collection of fossils. In 1863 the botanist Alexander Croall was appointed the first Librarian and Curator and the following year the museum and library were joined together. Croall left in 1875 to become the curator of the Smith Institute in Stirling.

The Derby Town and County Museum was transferred into the ownership of Derby Corporation in 1870, but there were difficulties in finding space to display the collections. After placing all the artefacts into storage for three years, the museum was finally opened to the public on 28 June 1879. The Art Gallery opened in 1882 and in 1883 the museum had electricity supplied for new lighting.

In 1936 the museum was given a substantial collection of paintings by Alfred E. Goodey who had been collecting art for 50 years. At his death in 1945 he left £13,000 to build an extension to the museum. The extension, which now houses the museum, was completed in 1964. Refurbishment to parts of both the new and old buildings were undertaken in 2010–11.

In 2012, over 1,000 items were stolen from the museum's storage facility between 2 May and 19 June. The museum did not know about the theft until they accessed the facility to remove an item from storage. Stolen items included coins, medals, and watches. A man was charged with receiving stolen goods in connection with the theft in January 2013. Some of the items stolen were recovered.

== Derby and the Enlightenment connection ==
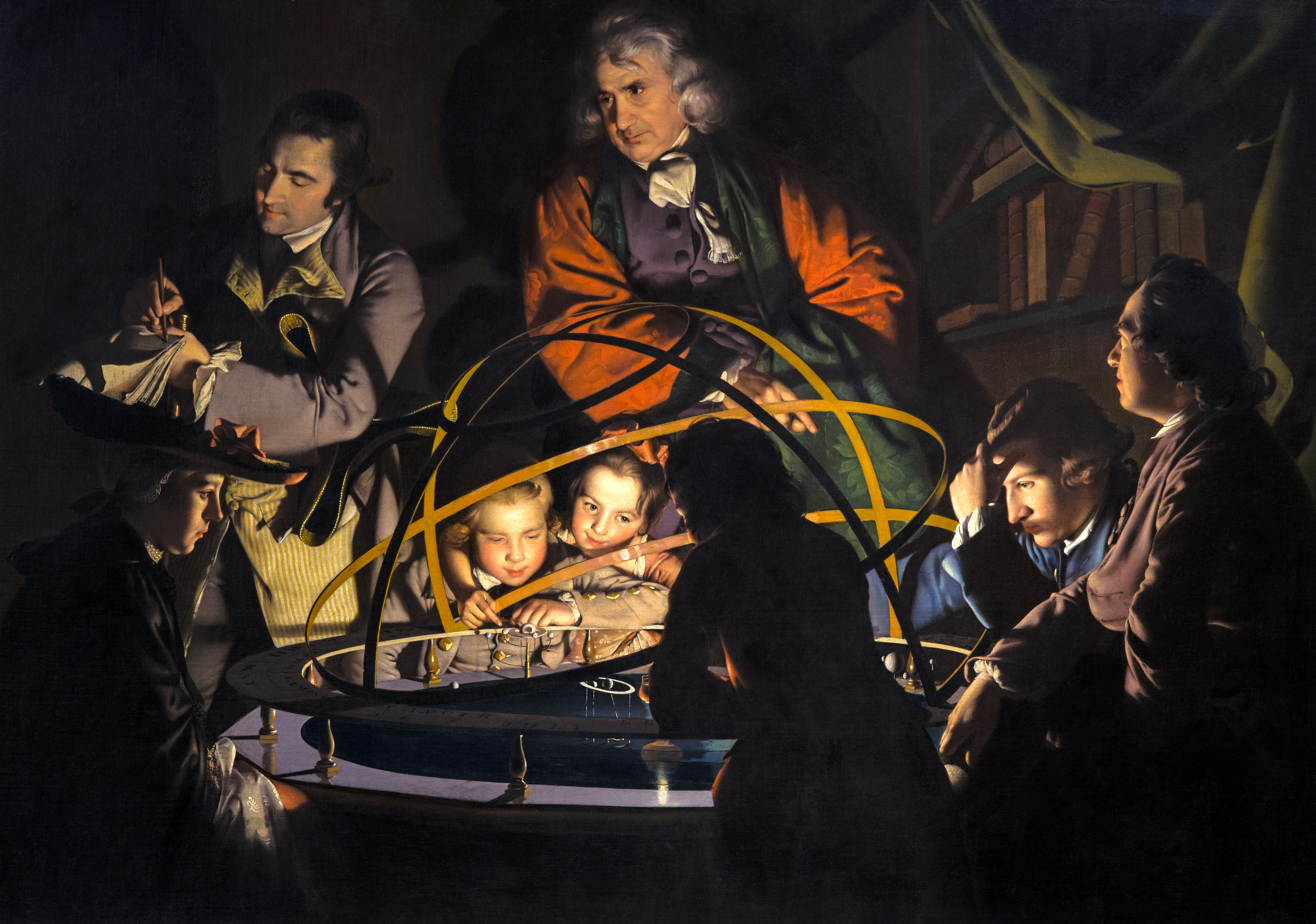
A Philosopher Lecturing on the Orrery, by Joseph Wright of Derby, 1766

Derby was significant in the eighteenth century for its role in the Enlightenment, a period in which science and philosophy challenged the divine right of kings to rule. The enlightenment has many strands, including the largely philosophical Scottish Enlightenment centred around the philosopher David Hume, and political changes that culminated in the French Revolution, but the English Midlands was an area where many key figures of industry and science came together. The Lunar Society included Erasmus Darwin, Matthew Boulton, Joseph Priestley and Josiah Wedgwood with Benjamin Franklin corresponding from America. Erasmus Darwin, grandfather of Charles Darwin, started the Derby Philosophical Society when he moved to Derby in 1783.

Some of the paintings by Joseph Wright of Derby, which are renowned for their use of light and shade, are of Lunar Society members. The Derby Gallery possesses over 300 sketches and 34 oil paintings by Wright, and also holds a document collection. One of the paintings is entitled The Alchymist in Search of the Philosopher's Stone (1771) and it depicts the discovery of the element phosphorus by German alchemist Hennig Brand in 1669. A flask into which a large quantity of urine has been boiled down is seen bursting into light as the phosphorus, which is abundant in urine, ignites spontaneously in air.

Modern working grand orrery in the museum's Joseph Wright gallery

A Philosopher Lecturing on the Orrery shows an early mechanism for demonstrating the movement of the planets around the Sun. The Scottish scientist, astronomer and lecturer James Ferguson undertook a series of lectures in Derby in July 1762. They were based on his book Lectures on Select Subjects in Mechanics, Hydrostatics, Pneumatics, Optics &c., published in 1760. In order to illustrate his lectures he used various machines, models and instruments. Wright possibly attended Ferguson's lecture, especially as tickets for the event were available from John Whitehurst, his close neighbour, the clockmaker and scientist. The artist could also have drawn on Whitehurst's practical knowledge to find out more about the orrery and its operation.

== Significance of Joseph Wright's paintings ==
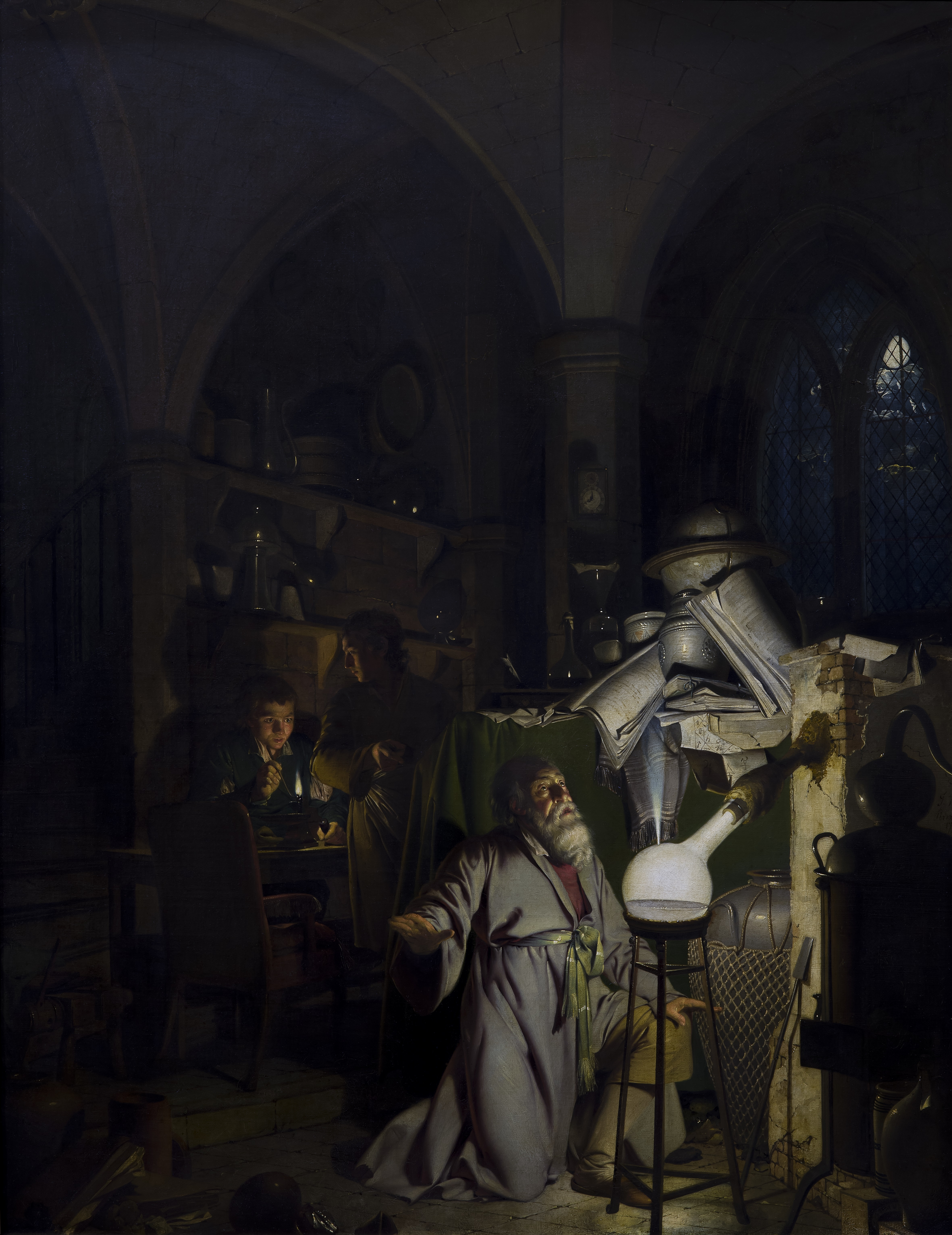
The Alchemist in Search of the Philosopher's Stone, by Joseph Wright, 1771

These factual paintings are considered to have metaphorical meaning too, the bursting into light of the phosphorus in front of a praying figure signifying the problematic transition from faith to scientific understanding and enlightenment, and the various expressions on the figures around the bird in the airpump indicating concern over the possible inhumanity of the coming age of science. These paintings represent a high point in scientific enquiry which began the undermining of the power of religion in Western societies. Some ten years later scientists worldwide found themselves persecuted, or even put to death in the backlash to the French Revolution of 1789, itself the culmination of enlightenment thinking. Joseph Priestley, member of the Lunar Society and discoverer of oxygen fled Britain after his laboratory in Birmingham was smashed and his house burned down in the Birmingham riots of 1791, by a mob objecting to his outspoken support for the French Revolution; and his colleague Lavoisier in France was executed at the guillotine. The politician and philosopher Edmund Burke, in his famous Reflections on the Revolution in France (1790), tied natural philosophers, and specifically Priestley, to the French Revolution, writing that radicals who supported science in Britain "considered man in their experiments no more than they do mice in an air pump". In the light of this comment, Wright's painting of the bird in the air pump, completed over twenty years earlier, seems particularly prescient.

Because of this web of connections related to science, and the tensions it created which were so subtly illustrated by the art of the painter Joseph Wright of Derby, Derby Museum and Art Gallery, far from being just a collection of fine paintings as the casual visitor might imagine, is significant for being in a place that some would see as having a very significant role in the birth of modern science and industry worldwide.

== Wright of Derby ==
In 2011, Derby City Council announced that it was to use Joseph Wright of Derby to brand the city of Derby. At the same time, the Museum announced that it was "joining forces" with Wikipedia to improve the quality of its information. In February 2011 the Museums, Libraries and Archives Council (MLA) announced that it had awarded Designated status to Derby Museum and Art Gallery for its nationally significant holdings of paintings and drawings by Joseph Wright.

== Bonnie Prince Charlie room ==
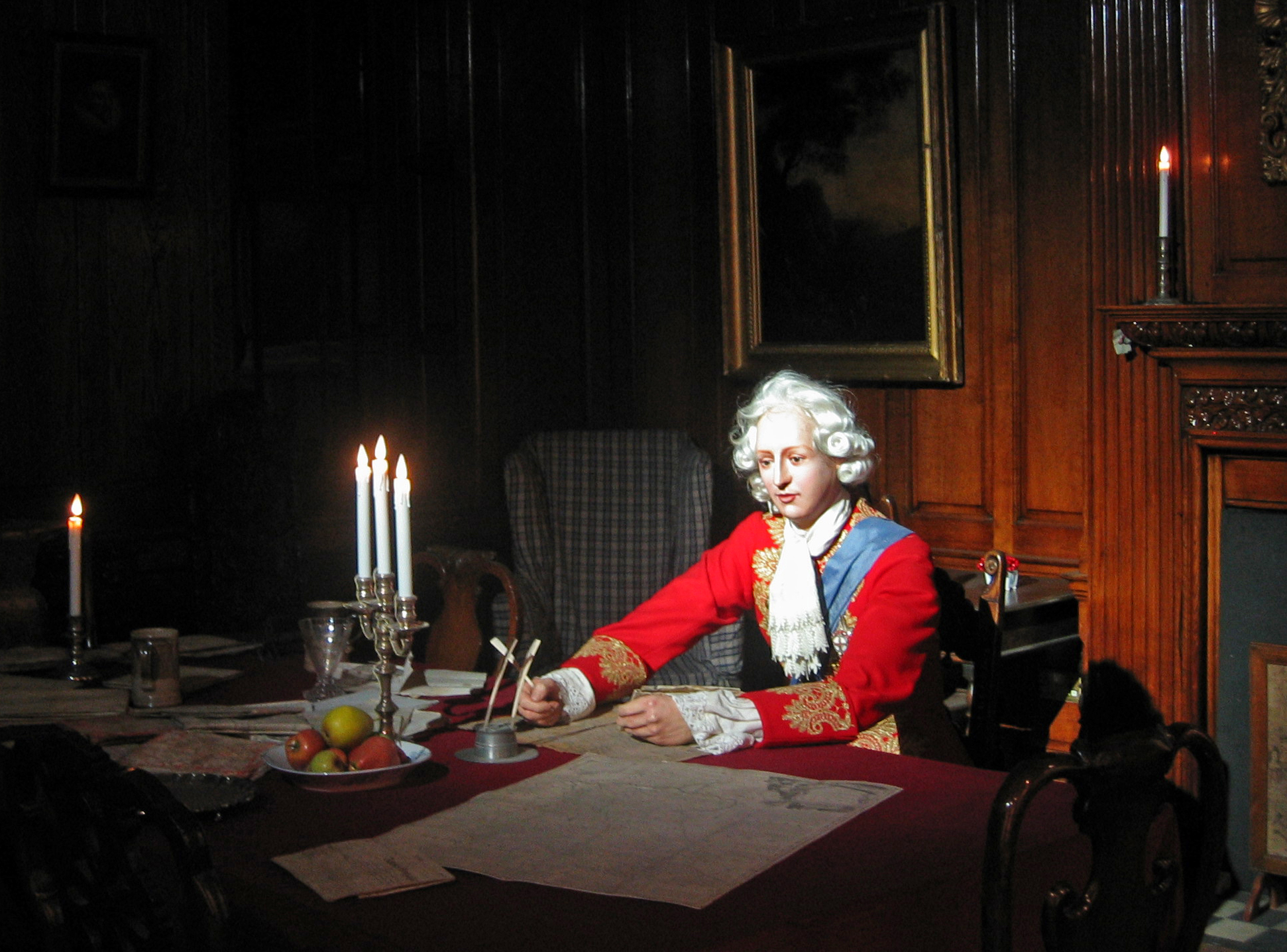
Bonnie Prince Charlie room today

The museum houses a replica of the room in Derby where Charles Edward Stuart held his council of war in 1745, while on his way south to seize the British crown. The panelling is from the original Exeter House, which was demolished in 1854. The panels were brought to the museum, which then received related objects as donations. Queen Victoria provided an original letter of Bonnie Prince Charlie from her own collection.

== Other artists ==
Besides the Wright collection there are also works by Benjamin West, E. E. Clark, Robert Priseman, Harold Gresley, Alfred John Keene, Georg Holtzendorff, David Payne, George and William Lakin Turner, Ernest Townsend, Samuel and Louise Rayner.

== Soldier's Story gallery ==
The Soldier's Story gallery is dedicated to the history of the 9th/12th Royal Lancers, the Sherwood Foresters and the Derbyshire Yeomanry.

== Wider collection ==
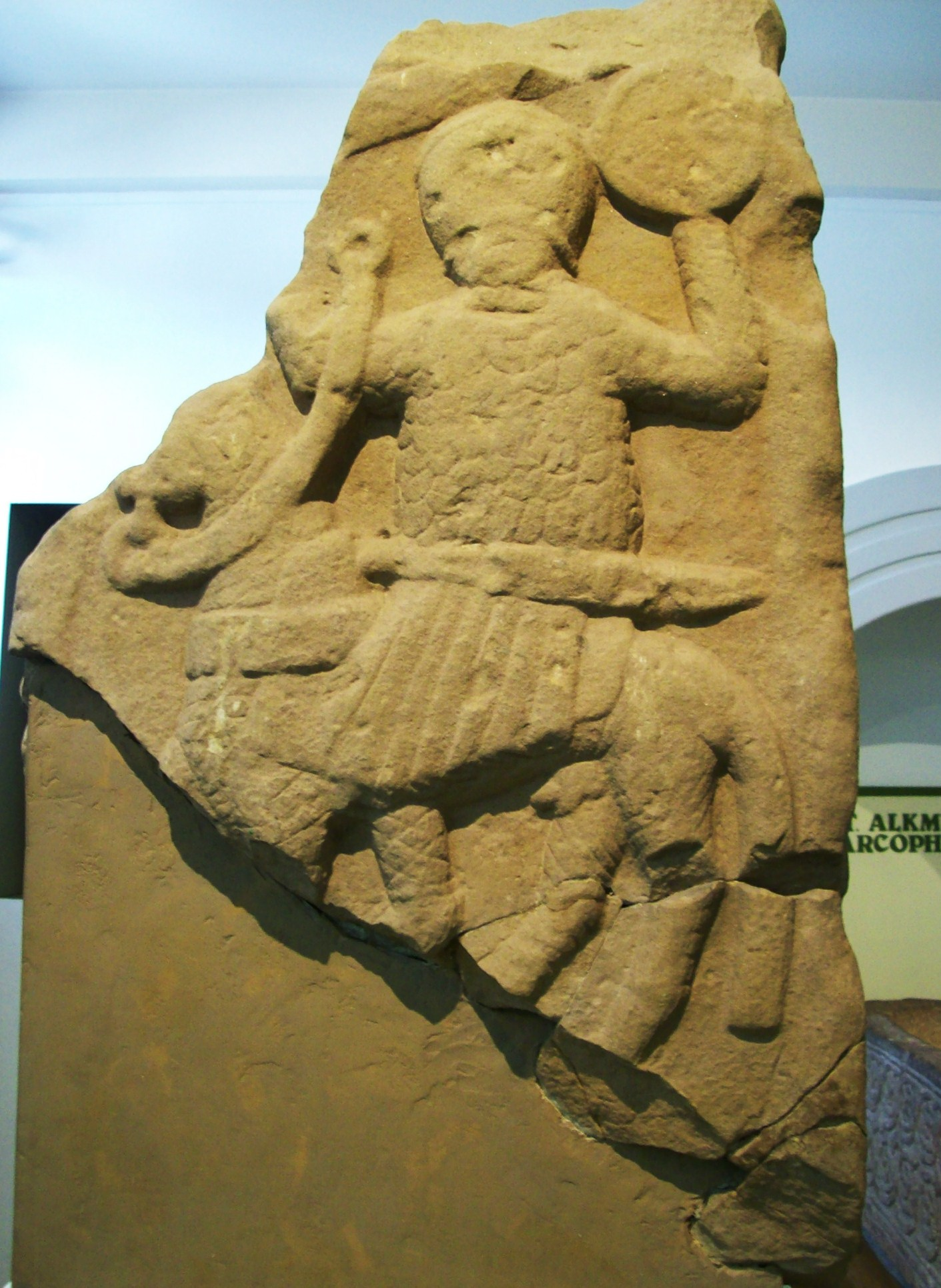
The mounted figure on the Repton Stone in the museum has been identified as King Æthelbald of Mercia

A fragment of a cross shaft from Repton includes on one face a carved image of a mounted man which, it has been suggested, may be a memorial to Æthelbald of Mercia. The figure is of a man wearing mail armour and brandishing a sword and shield, with a diadem around his head. In 757, Æthelbald was killed at Seckington, Warwickshire, near the royal seat of Tamworth and buried at Repton, Derbyshire. If this is Æthelbald, it would make it the earliest large-scale pictorial representation of an English monarch.

The museum has a large collection of items from the Bretby Art Pottery.

The museum is home to the mummified remains of two ancient Egyptians named Pypyu and Pa-sheri. In 2025 Pa-Sheri was temporally transferred to the University of Lincoln for conservation. As part of the process he was X-rayed which showed damage from an unwrapping.

== See also ==
- Collection of Derby Museum and Art Gallery
- Derby Silk Mill (Museum of Making)
- Derwent Valley Mills
- List of museums in Derbyshire
- Quad (arts centre)
