= Allenton hippopotamus =

Hippopotamus skeleton

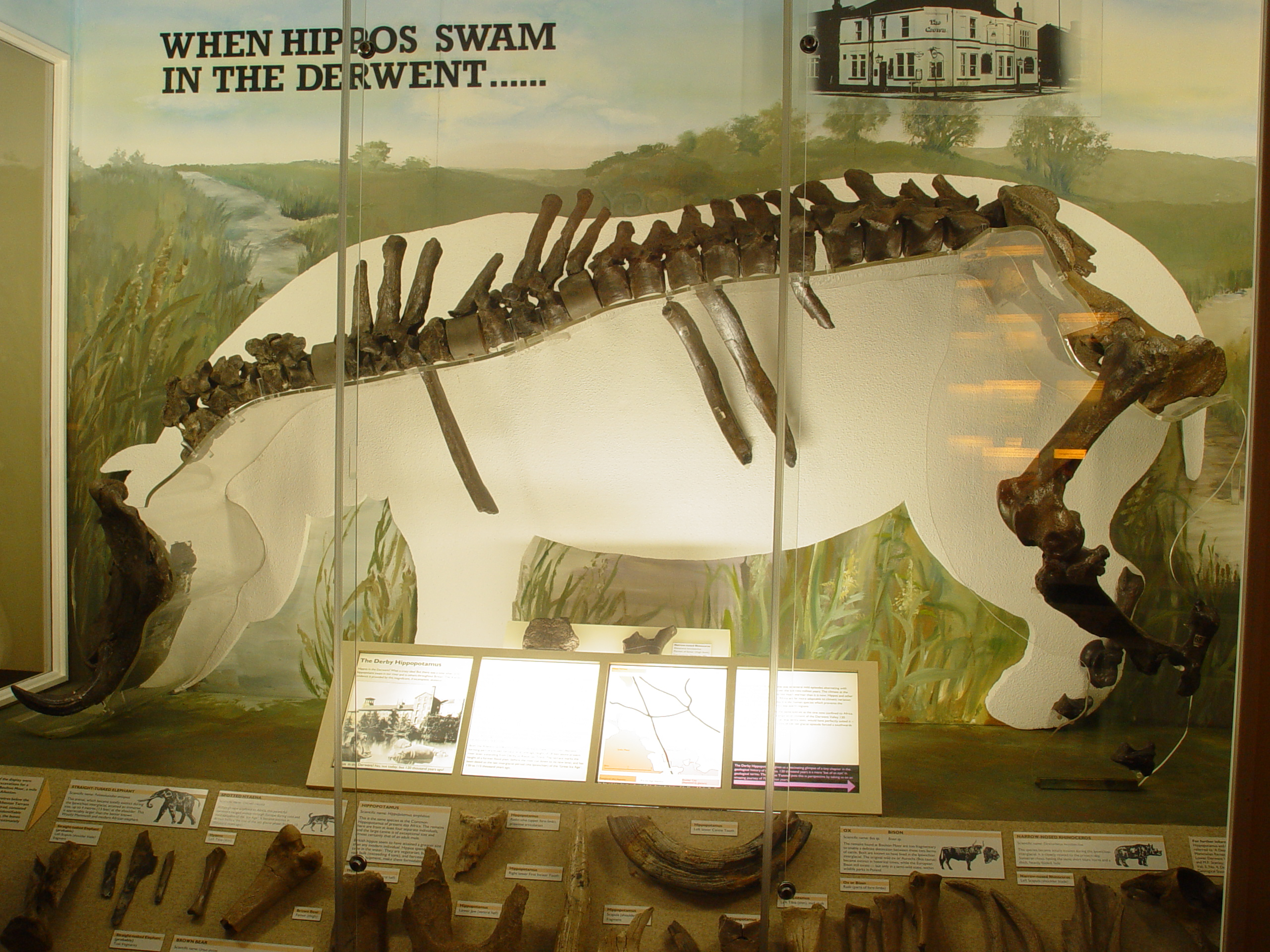
- Allenton hippopotamus skeleton displayed at Derby Museum and Art Gallery
- Material: Bone
- Size: Length: 3 m (120 in)
- Created: Last Interglacial (Ipswichian) c. 130-115,000 years ago
- Discovered: 1895; Allenton, Derby
- Present location: Natural History, Derby Museum, Derby

The Allenton hippopotamus is a hippopotamus (Hippopotamus amphibius) skeleton that was found in Allenton, Derby, England, in 1895. The skeleton is exhibited in Derby Museum and Art Gallery and is 3 metres (9.8 ft) in length. It is celebrated today in a sculpture near to where the skeleton was discovered.

== History ==
The suburb of Derby called Allenton used to be a village 5 kilometres (3 mi) from the city centre. A new well at the Crown Inn in the village was dug in March 1895, but work stopped when the diggers discovered first a bad smell and then large and unusual bones. Several notable people agreed to fund further investigations and it was agreed that the findings should be shared with the community. The hole was extended until it was 4.5 square metres (48 sq ft) in area although the depth was concealed by water, which rose to within 1.8 metres (6 ft) of the surface. Pumps were obtained and men were employed to power them in order that the hole could be dug further. These proceedings were observed by H.H. Bemrose and R.M. Deeley who later wrote an account of the digging. As agreed by the people who funded it, the bones were given to Derby Museum which had then been open for sixteen years.

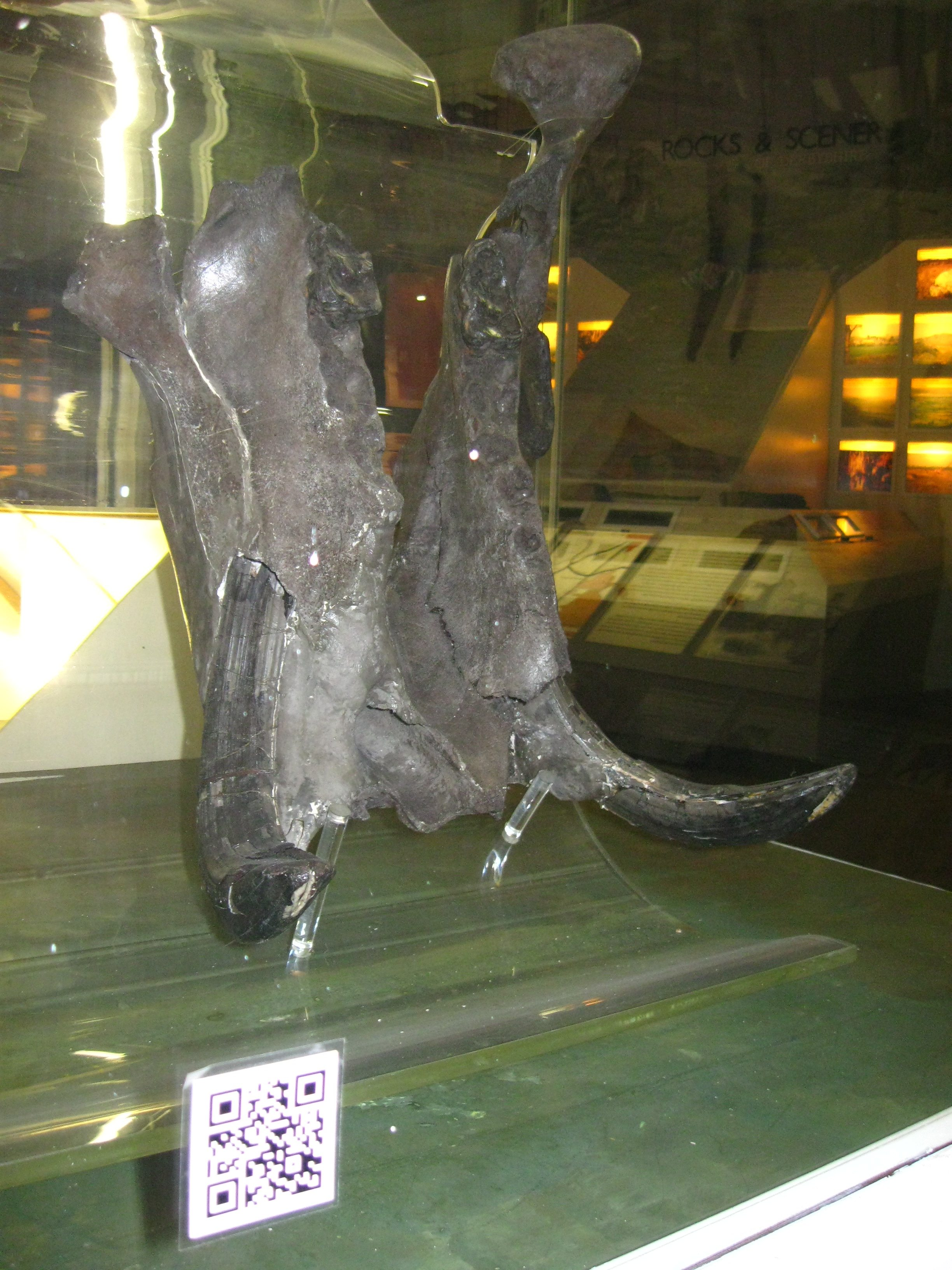
Lower jaw of Allenton hippopotamus and a QR code that links smart phones to this article

They eventually discovered 127 bones that came mostly from a hippopotamus, with a few belonging to rhinoceros and elephant. Arnold Bemrose took these bones as supporting evidence that Britain had a land bridge to Europe, as this was the most obvious explanation for such bones being found in England, Europe and underneath the North Sea.

The Allenton hippopotamus and other animal remains from Boulton Moor all originated from a feature known as the Allenton Terrace – a deposit of river gravels some 6 metres (20 ft) above the level of the modern River Derwent. The deposits have been dated to the Last Interglacial (Ipswichian), approximately 120,000 years ago. The presence of a hippopotamus indicates that the climate was warmer than today. The winters would have no prolonged periods of frost and the average summer temperature would have been above 18 °C.

== Later discoveries ==
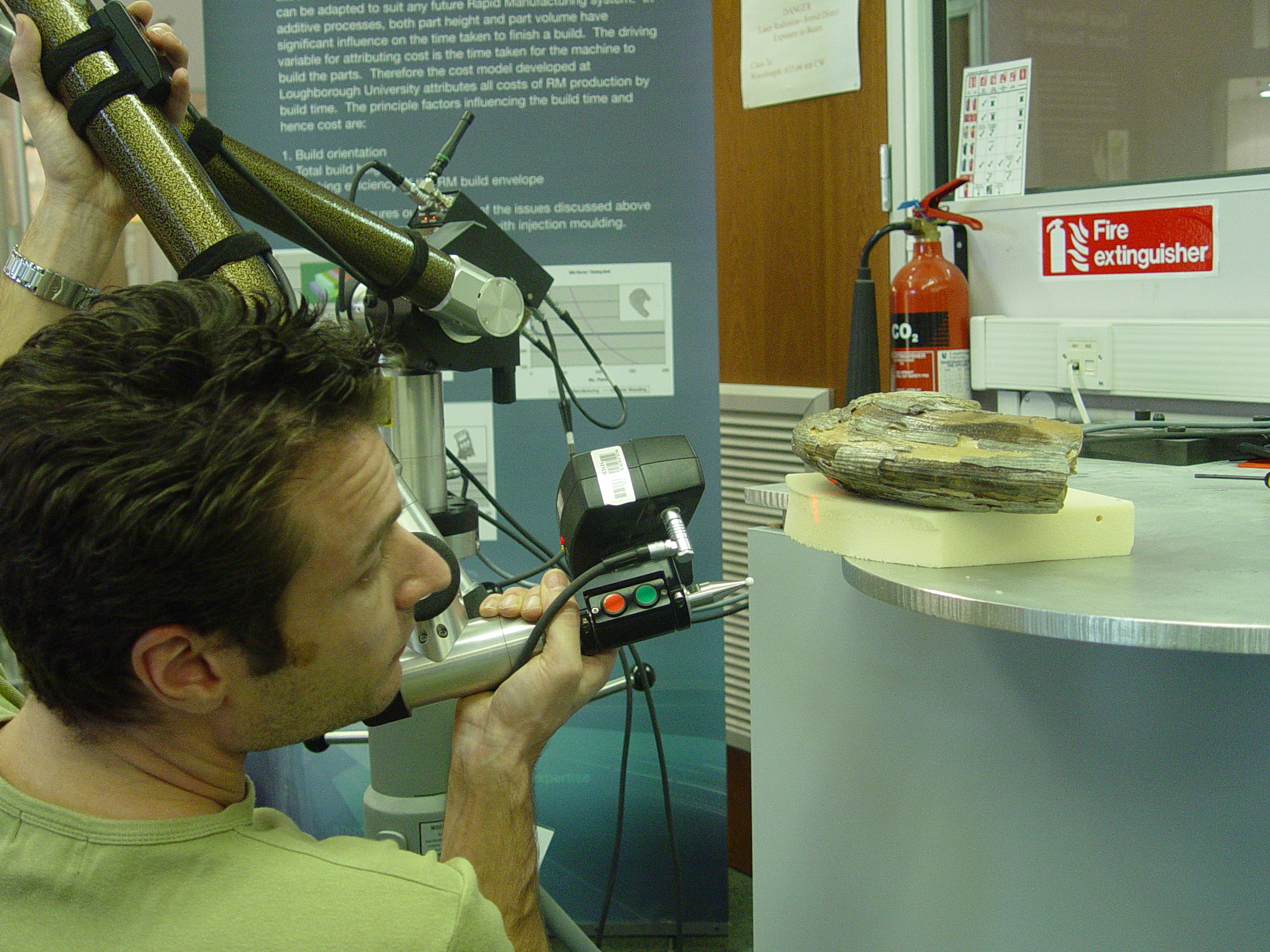
Laser scanning Allenton hippopotamus canine tooth at Loughborough University

In July 1973 workers discovered other bone fragments whilst digging in nearby Boulton Moor – some of which are also displayed in Derby Museum and Art Gallery. These excavations, for a sewer, uncovered bones from bear, deer, ox and more bones from hippopotamus, rhinoceros and elephants. These findings were just one or two bones – the best discovery was one of the largest hippopotamus teeth found in Britain.

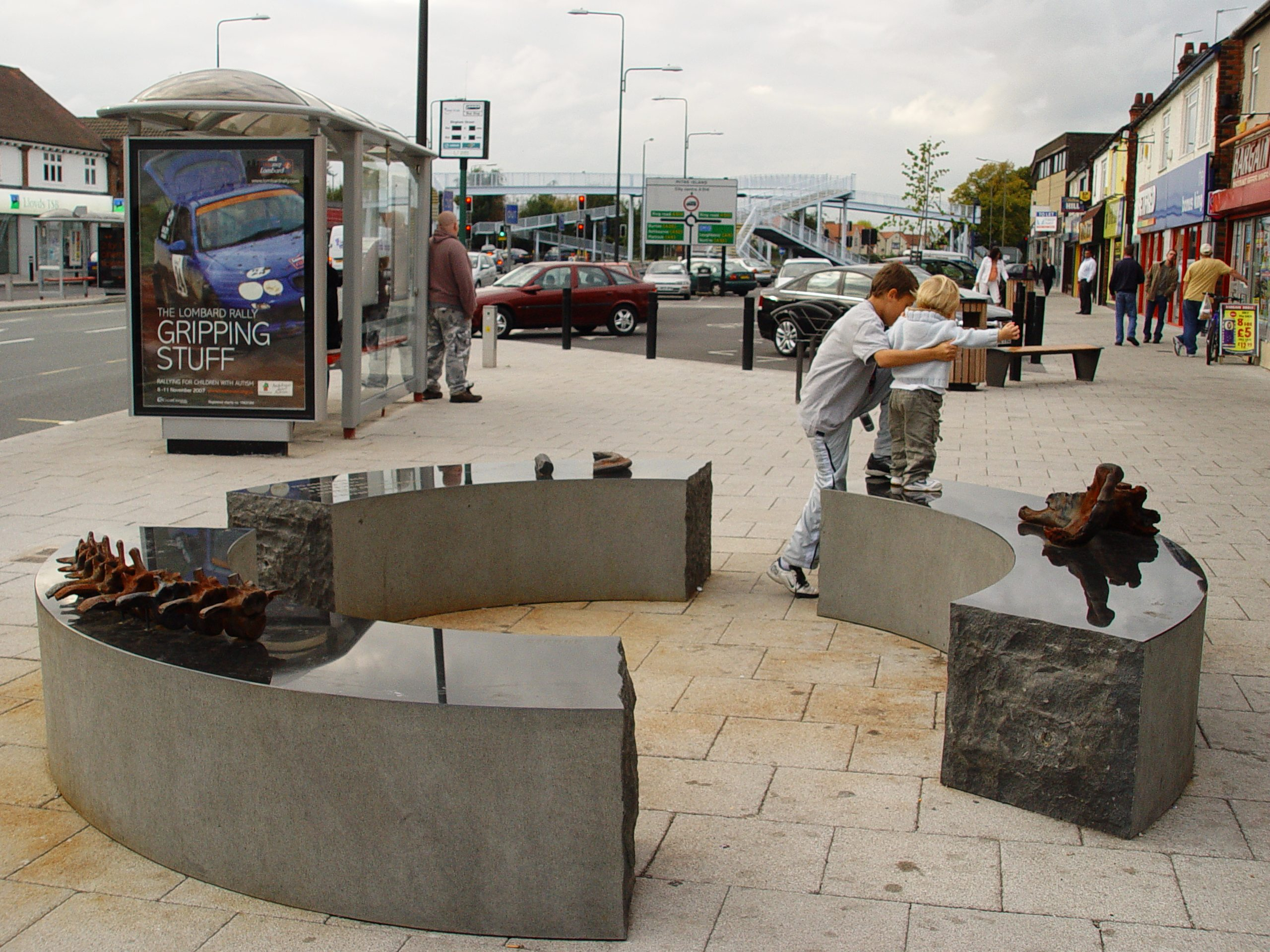
Sculpture in Allenton shopping centre

In 2006 Michael Dan Archer was commissioned to create a sculpture for Allenton. Discussions in Allenton revealed a desire within the community to have something that reflected the area's history. Archer's sculpture consists of three sections of a broken ring of black granite of sufficient size to form a seat. Above the polished granite surface are set cast-iron copies of bones from the hippopotamus's skeleton. Apart from the lower jaw, which was cast from a clay model, a selection of other bones were taken from Derby Museum to Loughborough University where they were laser-scanned to create a 3D computer model. This model then allowed exact copies of the bones chosen by Archer to be cast in iron.

== See also ==
- Armley Hippo, a named fossil specimen of H. amphibius found near Leeds
- List of individual hippopotamids
