= Dovecliff Hall =

Country house in Stretton, Staffordshire, England

Coordinates: 52.8443°N 1.6190°W

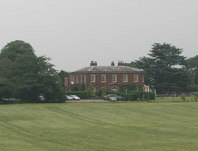
Dovecliff Hall Hotel

Dovecliff Hall (alternatively known as Dove Cliff Hall or Dovecliffe Hall) is a large Georgian country house in Stretton, East Staffordshire, England which is now a country house hotel. It is a Grade II listed building.

The house is built in two storeys of red brick with a hipped Westmorland slate roof. It has a 5 window frontage.

== History ==
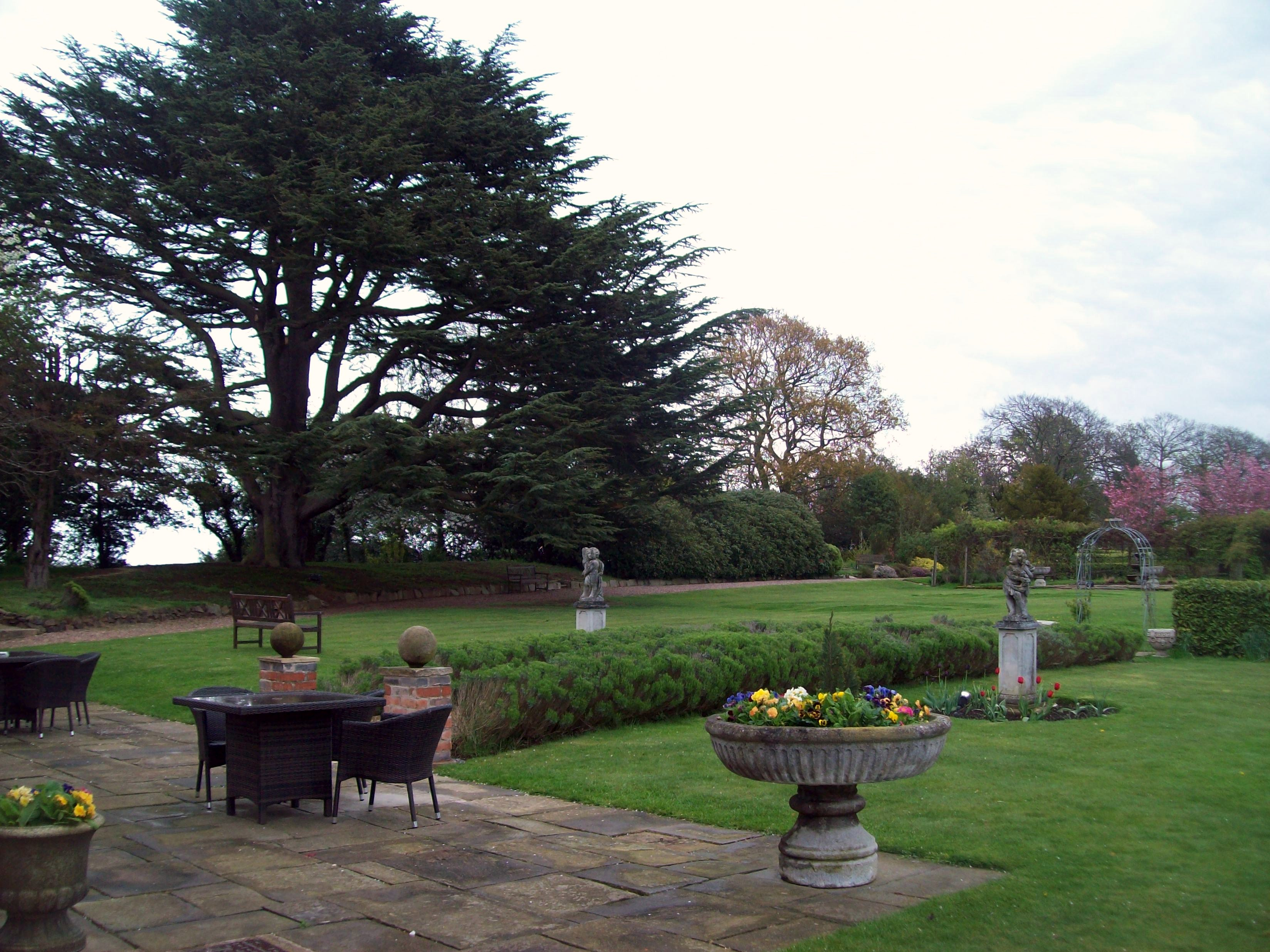
Terrace and gardens

The house was built in the 1790s on a 40-acre site at Dove Cliff, by the side of the River Dove, for Thomas Thornewill, a forge-owner from Stretton. It was inherited by his son Edward, whose widow lived there until her death in 1880. The following year Edward's son sold the estate, together with the Stretton iron-works, to William Joseph Smith of Alvaston, Derbyshire. Smith's widow sold the estate in 1897 to Hugh Spencer Charrington, a Burton-on-Trent brewer, who was already the tenant.

The house passed into the Bass family when Caroline, the daughter of Lord Bass, another well-known Burton brewer, married into the Charrington family at the same time that the Bass and Charrington breweries merged. Hugh Charrington died in 1921 and thereafter the house was either empty, tenanted or functioning as a hotel until it was purchased as a private house by a Colonel Sharpe in 1936.

In 1987 it was again converted to a hotel. Now known as the Dovecliff Hall Hotel, the property is owned by the family business of Abbot Grange Ltd, headed by Tony Sachdev and Gogi Singh.

== The Thornewill family ==
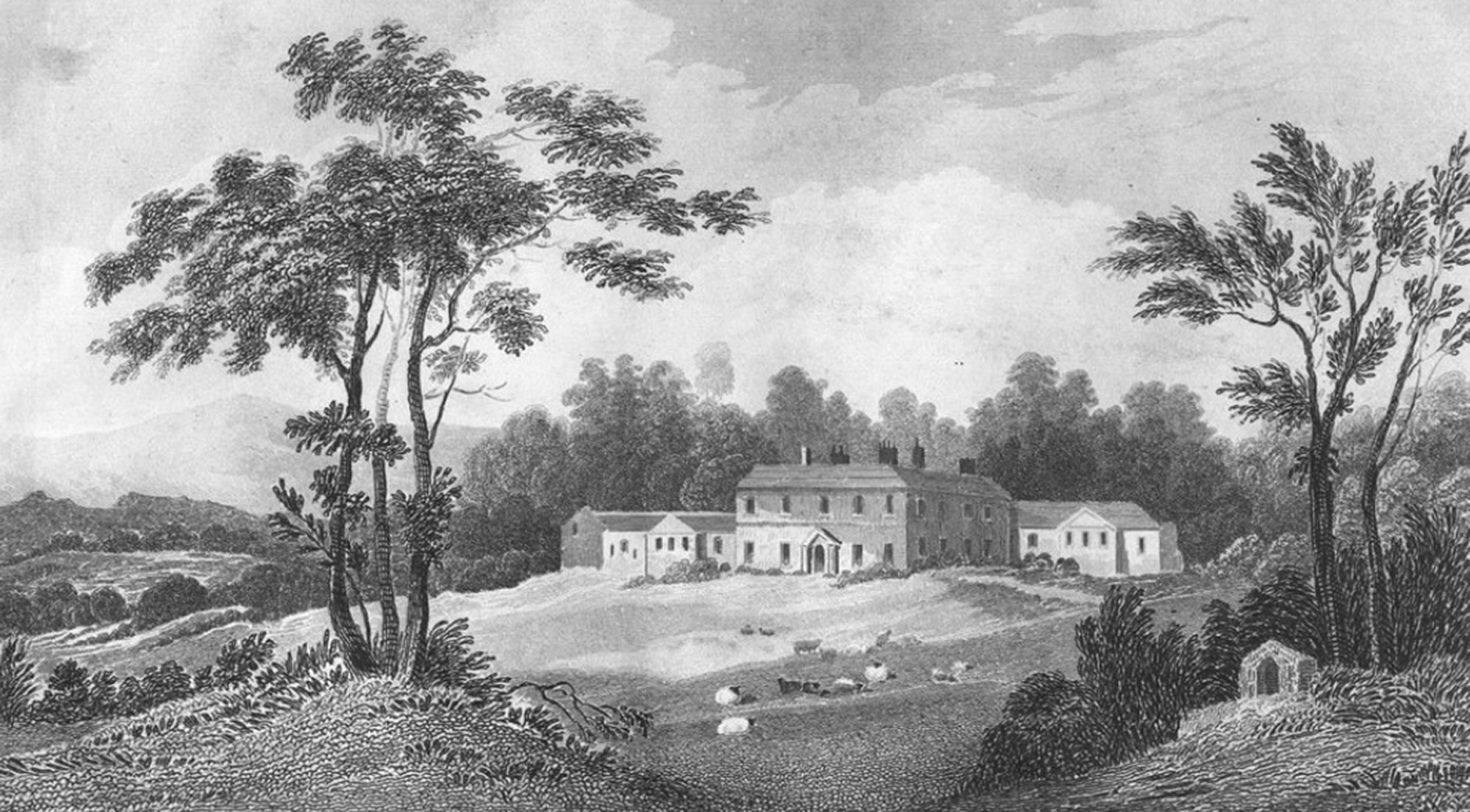
Engraving of Dovecliff, 1830

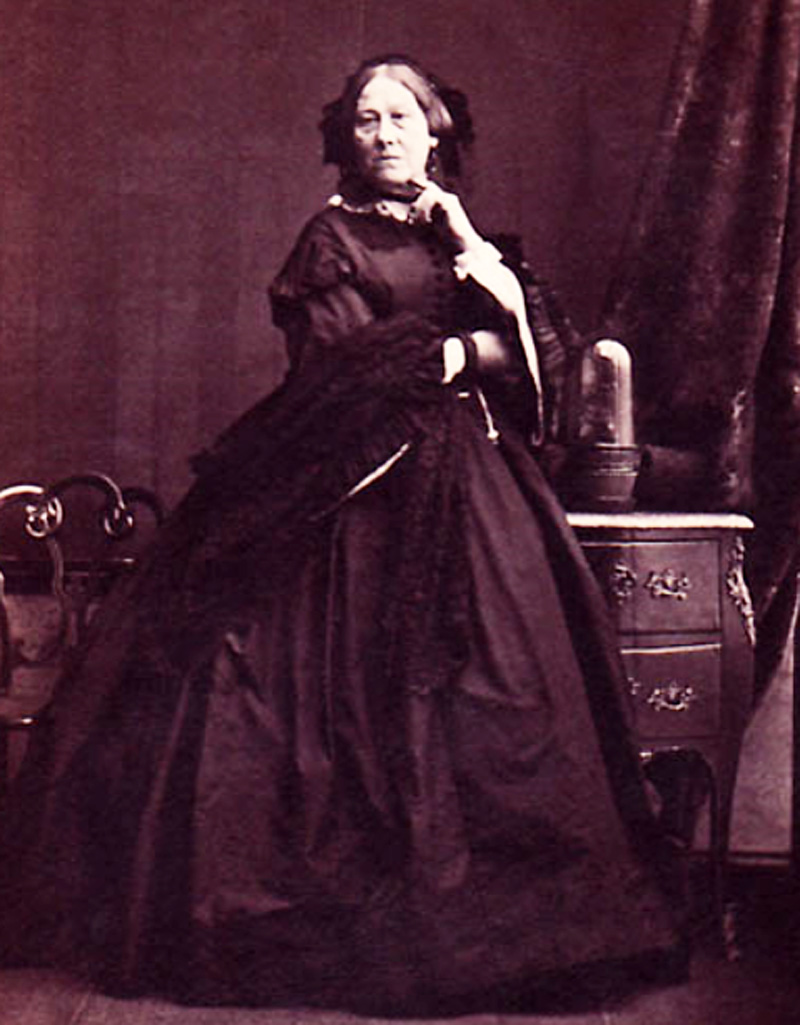
Mary Thornewill (née Preston), wife of Edward Thornewill

Thomas Thornewill (1760-1843) built Dovecliff Hall in about 1790 shortly after he was married. Thomas was the son of Thomas Thornewill (1719-1786) who owned a spade factory in Burton upon Trent and had converted a ruined corn mill near Stretton into a forge for hammering and plating iron. Thomas inherited this business in 1786 when his father died. Two years later in 1788 he married Mary Harvey in Birmingham.

Thomas expanded the business further and became a company called Thornewill and Co., iron masters. His wife Mary died in 1805. In 1830 he commissioned an engraver to draw a picture of Dovecliff which is shown. Thomas died in 1843 and his son Edward inherited Dovecliff and the family iron company, which became Thornewill and Warham in 1849.

Edward Thornewill (1801-1866) was born in 1801 at Dovecliff. In 1829 he married Mary Pearson (1801-1880) who was the daughter of clergyman Rev John Batteridge Pearson. The couple had nine children and two of their daughters were friends of King Edward VII. Harriet Georgina married Michael Arthur Bass and subsequently became Lord and Lady Burton. The King visited the Bass Brewery and the family on their estate at Rangemore in 1902, thus beginning the brewing of the now famous King’s Ale. One of their other daughters Jane Thornewill was a very good bridge player and was the King’s partner in numerous games of bridge. She was also a member of the King’s special group of friends called “the Marlborough House Set”. Edward died in 1866 and his wife Mary continued to live in the house until her death in 1880. After this the house was sold and was bought by William Joseph Smith.

== Later residents ==
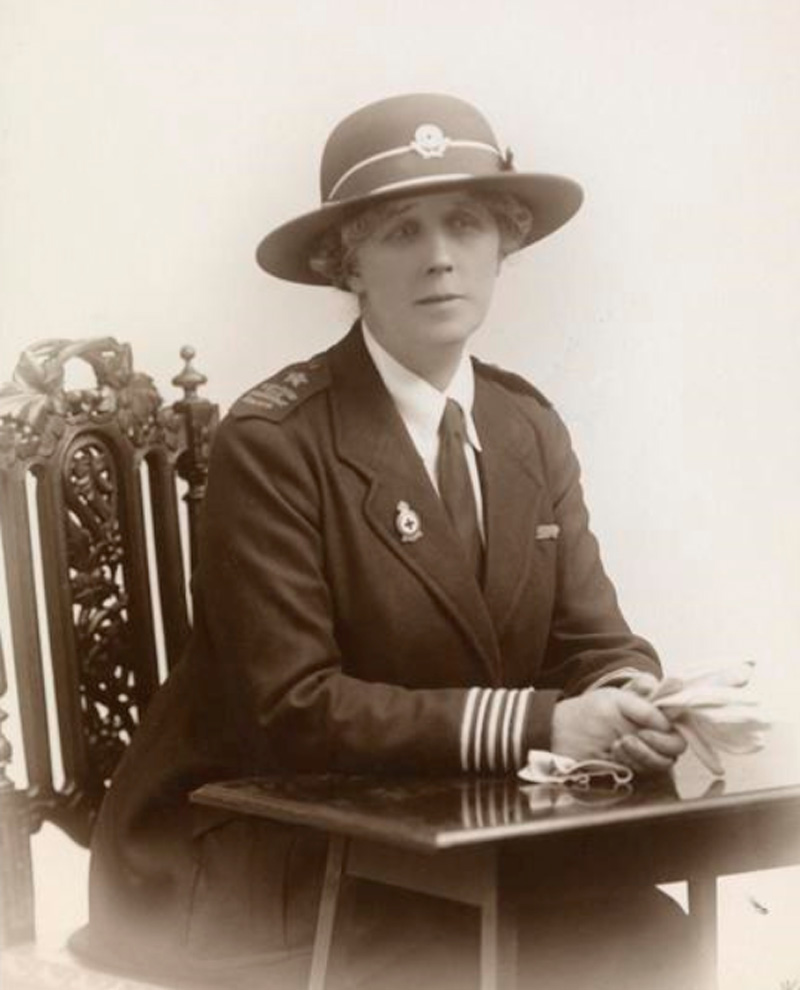
Elinor Mary Charrington in her Red Cross uniform

William Joseph Smith (1828-1891) was born in 1828 in Camberwell, Surrey. He was a member of the firm Boden and Co., lace manufacturers. In 1861 he married his cousin Frances Anne Boden who was the daughter of Henry Boden an owner of the lace company. In 1871 he became a Councillor of the Derby Town Council and in 1878 was elected as mayor. He died in 1891 and in 1897 his widow Frances sold the house to Hugh Spencer Charrington.

Hugh Spencer Charrington (1859-1952) was born in 1859 in Leyton, Essex. He was the son of Edward Charrington who was an owner of the long established brewing firm Charrington and Co. In 1880 he joined the family firm and became manager of the Burton Upon Trent brewery. In 1886, he married Elinor Mary Baggalley who was the daughter of Sir Richard Baggalley, Lord Justice of Appeal. The couple had three children.

His wife Elinor Mary Charrington became Vice President of the Burton Division of the British Red Cross and in 1918 received an Order of the British Empire (O.B.E.) for her services. Her photo in her Red Cross uniform is shown.

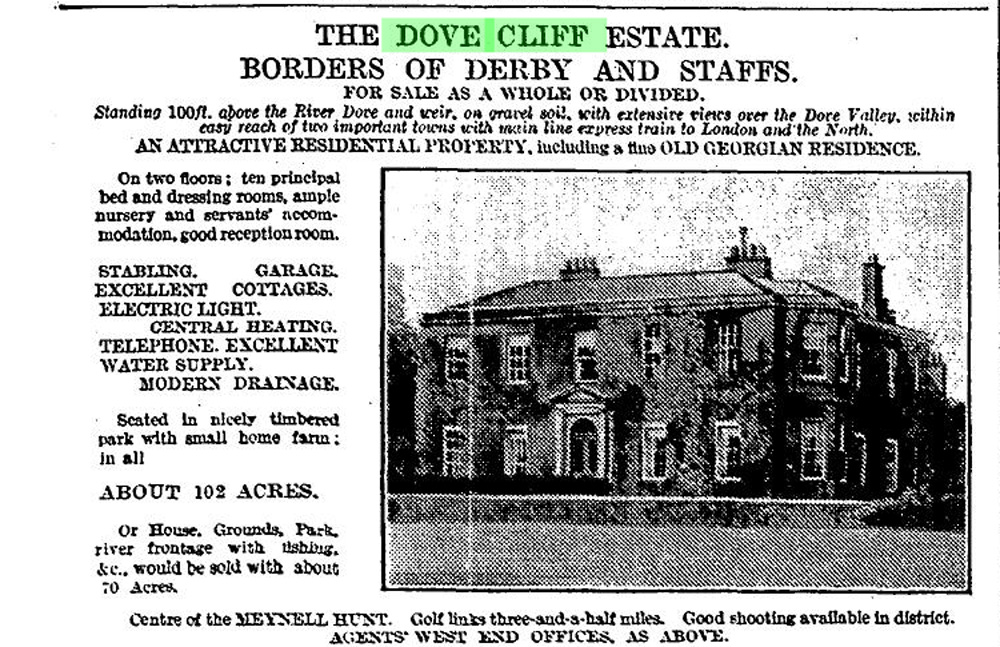
Sale notice for Dovecliff in 1924

The house was advertised for sale in 1924 and eventually it was bought in 1936 by Colonel Sydney Raymond Sharp. Colonel Sharp was born in 1891 in Burton Upon Trent. His father was John Thomas Sharp, a successful timber merchant who owned a company in Burton called Sharp Brothers and Knight.

During the First World War he won the Military Medal with two bars. In 1922 he married Dorothy Maude Lovewell. Sydney went into the timber business and established his own firm A. Sharp and Co. and eventually became the Director of his father’s firm and his own company.

In about 1960 the property was sold to Captain Anthony Walsham Neville Lake He lived here with his wife Penelope and children until the 1980s when it was sold and converted to a hotel.
