= Grade II* listed buildings in Chesterfield =

There are over 20,000 Grade II* listed buildings in England. This page is a list of these buildings in the district of Chesterfield in Derbyshire.

== Listed buildings ==
Name	Location	Type	Completed (Note: The date given is the date used by Historic England as significant for the initial building or that of an important part in the structure's description.)	Date designated	Grid ref. (Note: Sometimes known as OSGB36, the grid reference is based on the British national grid reference system used by the Ordnance Survey.) Geo-coordinates	Entry number (Note: The "List Entry Number" is a unique number assigned to each listed building and scheduled monument by Historic England.)	Image
Tapton Grove	Tapton, Brimington	House	c.1800	26 September 1977	SK4013672436; 53°14′51″N 1°24′00″W	1068875	Upload Photo
Church of St John the Baptist	Staveley	Church	13th century and later medieval	25 February 1966	SK4335474869; 53°16′09″N 1°21′05″W	1334670	Church of St John the Baptist More images
The Hagge	Nether Handley, Staveley	Country house	1630	25 February 1966	SK4119476542; 53°17′03″N 1°23′01″W	1205056	Upload Photo
Bank Close (now care home)	Chesterfield	House	Earlier 19th century	26 September 1977	SK3880270207; 53°13′39″N 1°25′13″W	1088274	Upload Photo
Gazebo at Brampton Manor	Brampton	Gazebo	Early 18th century	13 March 1968	SK3632071119; 53°14′09″N 1°27′26″W	1088267	Upload Photo
Mill buildings at Walton Works	Chesterfield	Mill	Late 18th century	27 September 2004	SK3677170735; 53°13′57″N 1°27′02″W	1391084	Mill buildings at Walton Works More images
Pagets Insurances Ltd and area railings	Chesterfield	Terrace	Late 18th century	15 July 1971	SK3818671326; 53°14′15″N 1°25′46″W	1088238	Pagets Insurances Ltd and area railings
Revolution House	Whittington	House	17th century	13 March 1968	SK3838774957; 53°16′13″N 1°25′33″W	1088283	Revolution House More images
Roman Catholic Eyre Chapel (behind Newbold Road)	Chesterfield	Chapel	Medieval	13 March 1968	SK3687472868; 53°15′06″N 1°26′56″W	1374497	Roman Catholic Eyre Chapel (behind Newbold Road)
Tapton House	Tapton	House	Late 18th century	13 March 1968	SK3921372156; 53°14′42″N 1°24′50″W	1088335	Tapton House More images
The Gazebo at Somersall Hall	Somersall	Gazebo	Early 17th century	13 March 1968	SK3525469967; 53°13′32″N 1°28′24″W	1203393	Upload Photo
The Royal Oak Inn	Chesterfield	Public house	16th century	15 July 1971	SK3829471080; 53°14′07″N 1°25′40″W	1334732	The Royal Oak Inn More images
The Town Pump	Chesterfield	Water pump	Early/mid-19th century	9 August 1976	SK3821771100; 53°14′08″N 1°25′44″W	1088256	The Town Pump More images
Unitarian Chapel	Chesterfield	Chapel	1694	15 July 1971	SK3832571245; 53°14′13″N 1°25′38″W	1088233	Unitarian Chapel More images
2 St Mary's Gate	Chesterfield	House	Early 17th century	13 March 1968	SK3856071205; 53°14′11″N 1°25′25″W	1025866	2 St Mary's Gate More images
9 Beetwell Street	Chesterfield	House	Late 16th or early 17th century	9 August 1976	SK3835270933; 53°14′03″N 1°25′37″W	1075161	9 Beetwell Street More images
42 St Mary's Gate	Chesterfield	House	Mid-18th century	4 September 1972	SK3853271016; 53°14′05″N 1°25′27″W	1088231	42 St Mary's Gate More images

== See also ==
- Grade I listed buildings in Derbyshire
- Grade II* listed buildings in Derbyshire
  - Grade II* listed buildings in Amber Valley
  - Grade II* listed buildings in Bolsover (district)
  - Grade II* listed buildings in Derby
  - Grade II* listed buildings in Derbyshire Dales
  - Grade II* listed buildings in Erewash
  - Grade II* listed buildings in High Peak
  - Grade II* listed buildings in North East Derbyshire
  - Grade II* listed buildings in South Derbyshire
