= Grade II* listed buildings in Derby =

There are over 20,000 Grade II* listed buildings in England. This page is a list of these buildings in the City of Derby in Derbyshire.

== List of buildings ==
Name	Location	Type	Completed (Note: The date given is the date used by Historic England as significant for the initial building or that of an important part in the structure's description.)	Date designated	Grid ref. (Note: Sometimes known as OSGB36, the grid reference is based on the British national grid reference system used by the Ordnance Survey.) Geo-coordinates	Entry number (Note: The "List Entry Number" is a unique number assigned to each listed building and scheduled monument by Historic England.)	Image
Allestree Hall	Derby	House	1802	13 February 1967	SK3464440714; 52°57′46″N 1°29′08″W	1215234	Allestree Hall More images
Church of All Saints	Mickleover	Church	14th century	19 January 1967	SK3052534203; 52°54′16″N 1°32′51″W	1216184	Church of All Saints More images
Church of St Anne	Derby	Church	1871	3 July 1998	SK3442736941; 52°55′44″N 1°29′22″W	1334930	Church of St Anne More images
Church of St Edmund	Allestree	Church	12th–13th century	13 February 1967	SK3479339714; 52°57′13″N 1°29′01″W	1228939	Church of St Edmund More images
Church of St John the Evangelist	Derby	Church	1828	20 June 1952	SK3451836612; 52°55′33″N 1°29′17″W	1215810	Church of St John the Evangelist More images
Church of St Luke	Derby	Church	Late 19th century	24 February 1977	SK3432135626; 52°55′01″N 1°29′28″W	1279315	Church of St Luke More images
Church of St Mary	Boulton	Church	12th century	10 November 1967	SK3844033038; 52°53′36″N 1°25′48″W	1287987	Church of St Mary More images
Church of St Peter	Chellaston	Church	15th century	10 November 1967	SK3811730378; 52°52′10″N 1°26′07″W	1227902	Church of St Peter More images
Church of St Peter and attached boundary walls	Derby	Church	Mid-/late 19th century	20 June 1952	SK3530836015; 52°55′13″N 1°28′35″W	1229224	Church of St Peter and attached boundary walls More images
Church of St Werburgh	Derby	Church	18th century	20 June 1952	SK3497936323; 52°55′23″N 1°28′52″W	1287685	Church of St Werburgh More images
College of Art Annexe	Derby	Art school	1876	24 February 1977	SK3519835846; 52°55′08″N 1°28′41″W	1227834	College of Art Annexe More images
Darley Abbey Mills (north complex) North Mill and engine house and boiler house	Darley Abbey	Mill buildings	c. 1825	13 February 1967	SK3540138634; 52°56′38″N 1°28′29″W	1067808	Darley Abbey Mills (north complex) North Mill and engine house and boiler house More images
Darley Abbey Mills (north complex) preparation building and cottage and workshop and cart sheds to north of site	Derby	Mill buildings	1790s	13 February 1967	SK3537238676; 52°56′40″N 1°28′30″W	1067809	Darley Abbey Mills (north complex) preparation building and cottage and workshop and cart sheds to north of site More images
Former carriage shop at Derby Railway Works	Derby	Railway works	1840	21 February 1994	SK3637935646; 52°55′01″N 1°27′38″W	1278575	Upload Photo
Former engine shed (remains of the original Midland Region Railway Station)	Derby	Railway engineering workshop	c.1830	24 February 1977	SK3636935593; 52°55′00″N 1°27′38″W	1228933	Former engine shed (remains of the original Midland Region Railway Station)
Former railway workshop at Derby Railway Works	Derby	Turning shop	19th century	24 February 1977	SK3633335699; 52°55′03″N 1°27′40″W	1230740	Former railway workshop at Derby Railway Works More images
Friary Hotel	Derby	Hotel	Mid-18th century	20 June 1952	SK3480336333; 52°55′24″N 1°29′02″W	1227747	Friary Hotel More images
Green Man Inn	Derby	Public house	17th century	20 June 1952	SK3531335984; 52°55′12″N 1°28′34″W	1229456	Green Man Inn More images
Midland Railway War Memorial	Derby	War memorial	1921	24 February 1977	SK3608635478; 52°54′56″N 1°27′53″W	1228742	Midland Railway War Memorial More images
Old Abbey Building	Darley Abbey	Augustinian monastery	15th century	13 February 1967	SK3525738411; 52°56′31″N 1°28′36″W	1287744	Old Abbey Building More images
Old Grammar School	Derby	Former school	16th century	20 June 1952	SK3528136002; 52°55′13″N 1°28′36″W	1279098	Old Grammar School More images
Old Hall	Mickleover	Timber-framed house	1649	2 September 1952	SK3052834024; 52°54′10″N 1°32′51″W	1279400	Old Hall
Pair of gateways leading to Spondon School (Upper House) and Adult Centre	Spondon	Gate	18th century	10 November 1967	SK3962936096; 52°55′15″N 1°24′43″W	1279402	Pair of gateways leading to Spondon School (Upper House) and Adult Centre More images
Roman Catholic Church of St Mary	Derby	Church	1838	20 June 1952	SK3511836792; 52°55′39″N 1°28′45″W	1215808	Roman Catholic Church of St Mary More images
Rykneld Mill	Derby	Mill buildings	c. 1808	24 February 1977	SK3474836699; 52°55′36″N 1°29′04″W	1215910	Rykneld Mill
Stone House Prebend	Derby	Farmhouse	Late 16th century	20 June 1952	SK3524937485; 52°56′01″N 1°28′37″W	1228772	Upload Photo
St Mary's Bridge	Derby	Bridge	18th century	20 June 1952	SK3538436766; 52°55′38″N 1°28′30″W	1215897	St Mary's Bridge More images
Wardwick Tavern Public House	Derby	Public house	Early 18th century	20 June 1952	SK3508936205; 52°55′20″N 1°28′46″W	1229898	Wardwick Tavern Public House More images
27 Friar Gate	Derby	House	Mid-18th century	20 June 1952	SK3474336396; 52°55′26″N 1°29′05″W	1216457	27 Friar Gate More images
42 Friar Gate	Derby	House	Mid-18th century	20 June 1952	SK3464336464; 52°55′28″N 1°29′10″W	1216463	42 Friar Gate More images
43–44 Friar Gate	Derby	House	Mid-18th century	20 June 1952	SK3462836458; 52°55′28″N 1°29′11″W	1216527	43–44 Friar Gate More images
47–51 Friar Gate	Derby	Building	Late 18th century	20 June 1952	SK3459236480; 52°55′29″N 1°29′13″W	1287582	47–51 Friar Gate More images
99 Friar Gate	Derby	House	Mid-18th century	20 June 1952	SK3470636374; 52°55′25″N 1°29′07″W	1216586	99 Friar Gate More images
35–36 St Mary's Gate	Derby	Building	Early/mid-18th century	20 June 1952	SK3510436459; 52°55′28″N 1°28′45″W	1279144	35–36 St Mary's Gate More images
1 and 2 Brick Row	Darley Abbey	Former school	1826	13 February 1967	SK3509338443; 52°56′32″N 1°28′45″W	1287988	1 and 2 Brick Row More images
3–16 Brick Row	Darley Abbey	Workers' cottage	Late 18th or early 19th century	24 February 1977	SK3512038489; 52°56′34″N 1°28′44″W	1287923	3–16 Brick Row More images
33 Wardwick	Derby	House	17th century	20 June 1952	SK3504936229; 52°55′20″N 1°28′48″W	1278869	33 Wardwick More images
48 Sadler Gate	Derby	Town house	1675	20 June 1952	SK3515936314; 52°55′23″N 1°28′43″W	1279059	48 Sadler Gate More images

== See also ==
- Grade I listed buildings in Derbyshire
- Grade II* listed buildings in Derbyshire
  - Grade II* listed buildings in Amber Valley
  - Grade II* listed buildings in Bolsover (district)
  - Grade II* listed buildings in Chesterfield
  - Grade II* listed buildings in Derbyshire Dales
  - Grade II* listed buildings in Erewash
  - Grade II* listed buildings in High Peak
  - Grade II* listed buildings in North East Derbyshire
  - Grade II* listed buildings in South Derbyshire
