= Allenton, Derby =

Suburb of Derby, England

Coordinates: 52.884°N 1.446°W

Allenton
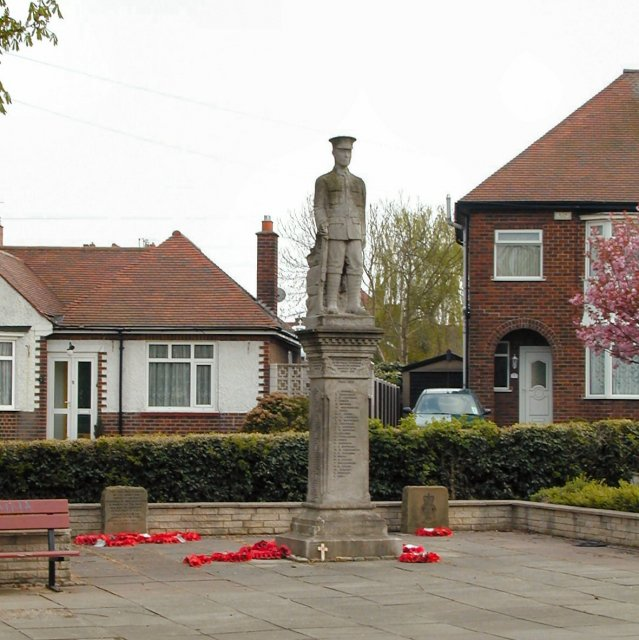
- Allenton war memorial

- Location within Derbyshire
- Population: 5,000 (Approx 2011 Census)
- OS grid reference: SK3732
- Unitary authority: Derby
- Ceremonial county: Derbyshire
- Region: East Midlands
- Country: England
- Sovereign state: United Kingdom
- Post town: DERBY
- Postcode district: DE24
- Dialling code: 01332
- Police: Derbyshire
- Fire: Derbyshire
- Ambulance: East Midlands
- UK Parliament: Derby South

Allenton is a small suburb of the city of Derby, England, situated about three miles south of the city centre. It is located between the suburbs of Osmaston, Boulton, Alvaston and Shelton Lock, and is within the Alvaston South ward. Allenton has a high footfall, with a variety of modern shops, stores and other facilities, including free parking. The suburb has its own busy market every Friday and Saturday located on Osmaston Road.

== History ==
Allenton (formerly Allentown) was named after Isaac Allen who built the first houses there in 1878. One hundred and twenty thousand years ago, during a warmer part of the Ice Age, the whole area was a riverside swamp, and skeletons of a hippopotamus, elephant, brown bear, hyena and bison have been found there. The Allenton hippopotamus was found in 1895 underneath the Crown Hotel (established in 1891) and its well-preserved skeleton is displayed at the Derby Museum and Art Gallery.

== Landmarks ==
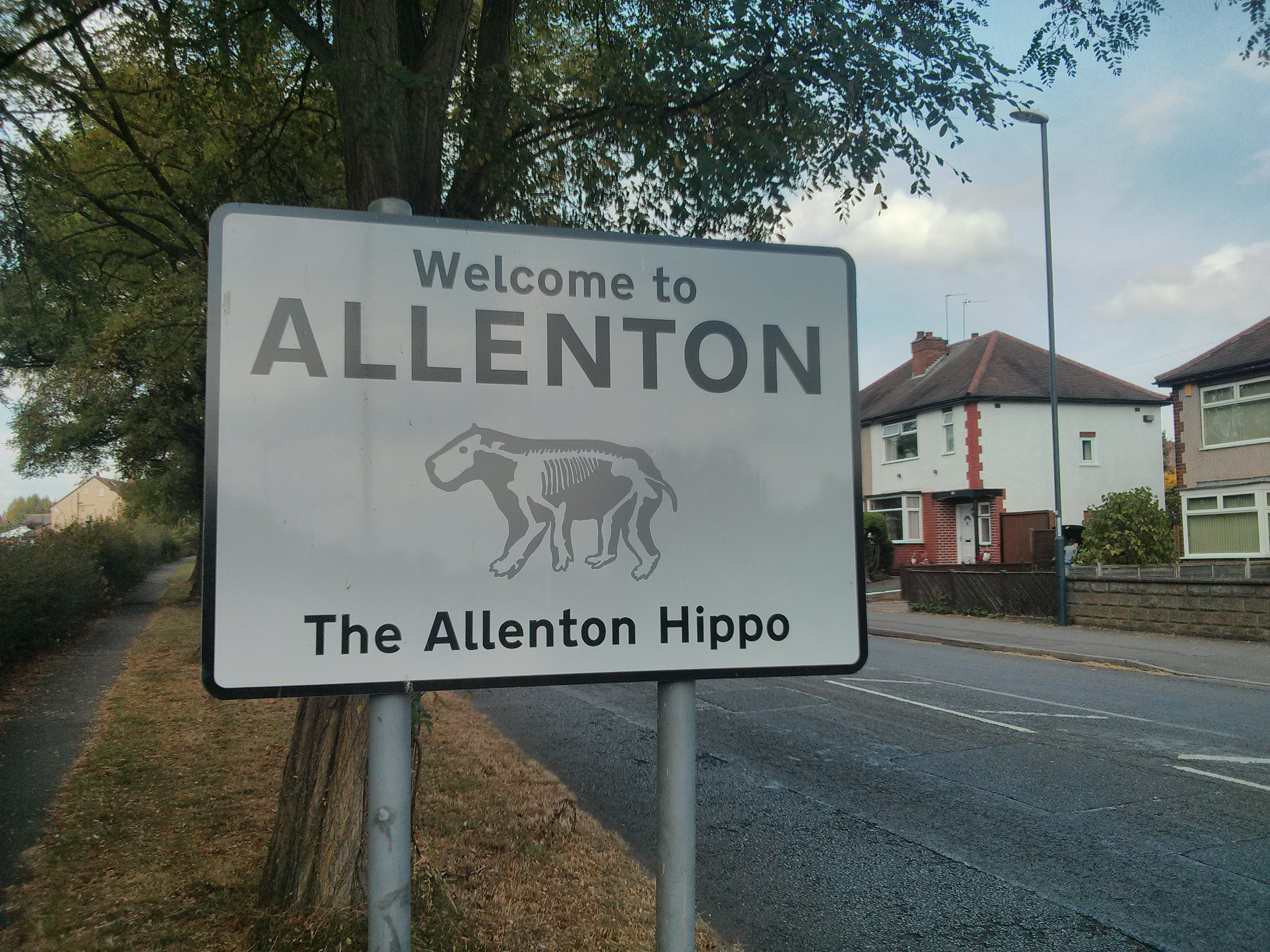
Branding with the Allenton hippo

Allenton gives its name to a geological feature known as the Allenton Terrace, which is the fluvial terrace of sand and gravel in the lower valley of the River Derwent that it and the surrounding settlements are built on.

Allenton has a cosmopolitan outdoor market, although this has been in decline. The suburban shopping centre is among the largest in Derby although there are few high street chains except for Boots, Poundstretcher and Greggs. A functional sculpture by Michael Dan Archer was installed in the shopping centre in 2007. Commissioned by Derby City Council, it forms a circular seating area on which are laser-scanned copies and models of some of the key bones of the Allenton Hippo skeleton at the Derby Museum and Art Gallery.

An easily recognisable feature of the local streetscape is a pedestrian footbridge over the Mitre Island roundabout, erected in July 1971. This footbridge is popularly known as "the Spider Bridge" and gains that popular appellation because it has eight 'legs' in four directions. Each direction has a set of steep steps and a stepped ramp (for easier wheelchair access). The footbridge has been painted various colours over the years and is currently painted white.

== Culture ==
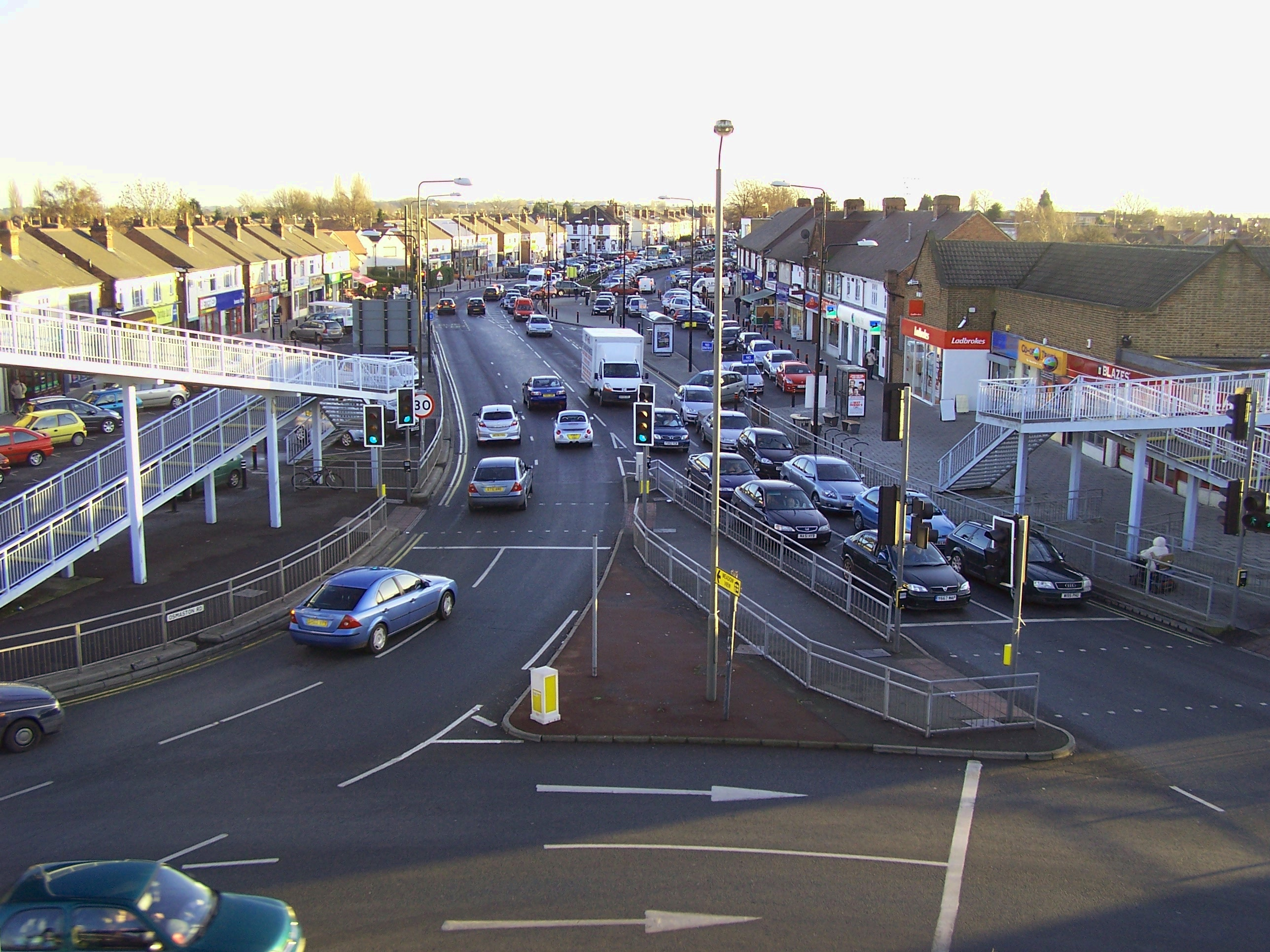
Looking south along Chellaston Road from the Spider Bridge

Allenton has a large number of employees in the aero-engine industry as Rolls-Royce plc has its jet engine production facility adjacent to Allenton.

The former Alvaston & Boulton Board School, built in 1890, on Allen Street, houses the community library.

Brexit negotiator David Frost took the title "Baron Frost of Allenton in the County of Derbyshire" in 2020, in recognition of Allenton being his birthplace, although he was educated in Nottingham.

The old Derby Canal has long been transformed into a bicycle track with tarmac surface; this track, which runs through the recreational ground, offers access by bicycle from Allenton into Derby city centre – it is part of the National Cycle Network.

Adjacent to the shopping area is a public house: The Crown Inn (see Crown Hotel above), a Victorian roadside inn dating to 1891 and built by Issac Allen, the original developer of Allenton. Another public house, in a Stockbroker's Tudor design, by the name of The Mitre, was opened in 1930 for Zachary Smith's brewery when Harvey Road was built, and was demolished in 2020.

There is a school, a dentist, a playing field and a sizeable public recreational ground, beauty salons, hairdressers, several charity shops, several hot food outlets and a flower shop. Just beyond the edges of Allenton can be found a secondary school and several medical practices. The local fire station, in Osmaston, is just a few hundred yards from the shops in Allenton.

== Facilities ==
The Moorways sports centre £42 million redevelopment is scheduled to be completed by March 2022 with a competition-standard, 50-metre competition swimming pool having moveable booms and two leisure pools with flumes. The location has further infrastructure of sauna, dance studio and gym to complement the existing running track, with the whole being named Moorways Sports Village.
