= Grade II* listed buildings in Derbyshire =

Derbyshire shown within England

The county of Derbyshire is divided into nine districts. The districts of Derbyshire are High Peak, Derbyshire Dales, South Derbyshire, Erewash, Amber Valley, North East Derbyshire, Chesterfield, Bolsover, and Derby.

As there are 460 Grade II* listed buildings in the county they have been split into separate lists for each district.

- Grade II* listed buildings in Amber Valley
- Grade II* listed buildings in Bolsover (district)
- Grade II* listed buildings in Chesterfield
- Grade II* listed buildings in Derby
- Grade II* listed buildings in Derbyshire Dales
- Grade II* listed buildings in Erewash
- Grade II* listed buildings in High Peak
- Grade II* listed buildings in North East Derbyshire
- Grade II* listed buildings in South Derbyshire

== See also ==
- Grade I listed buildings in Derbyshire

== See also ==
- Category:Grade II* listed buildings in Derbyshire
