= Boulton St Mary's Church =

Boulton St Mary’s Church
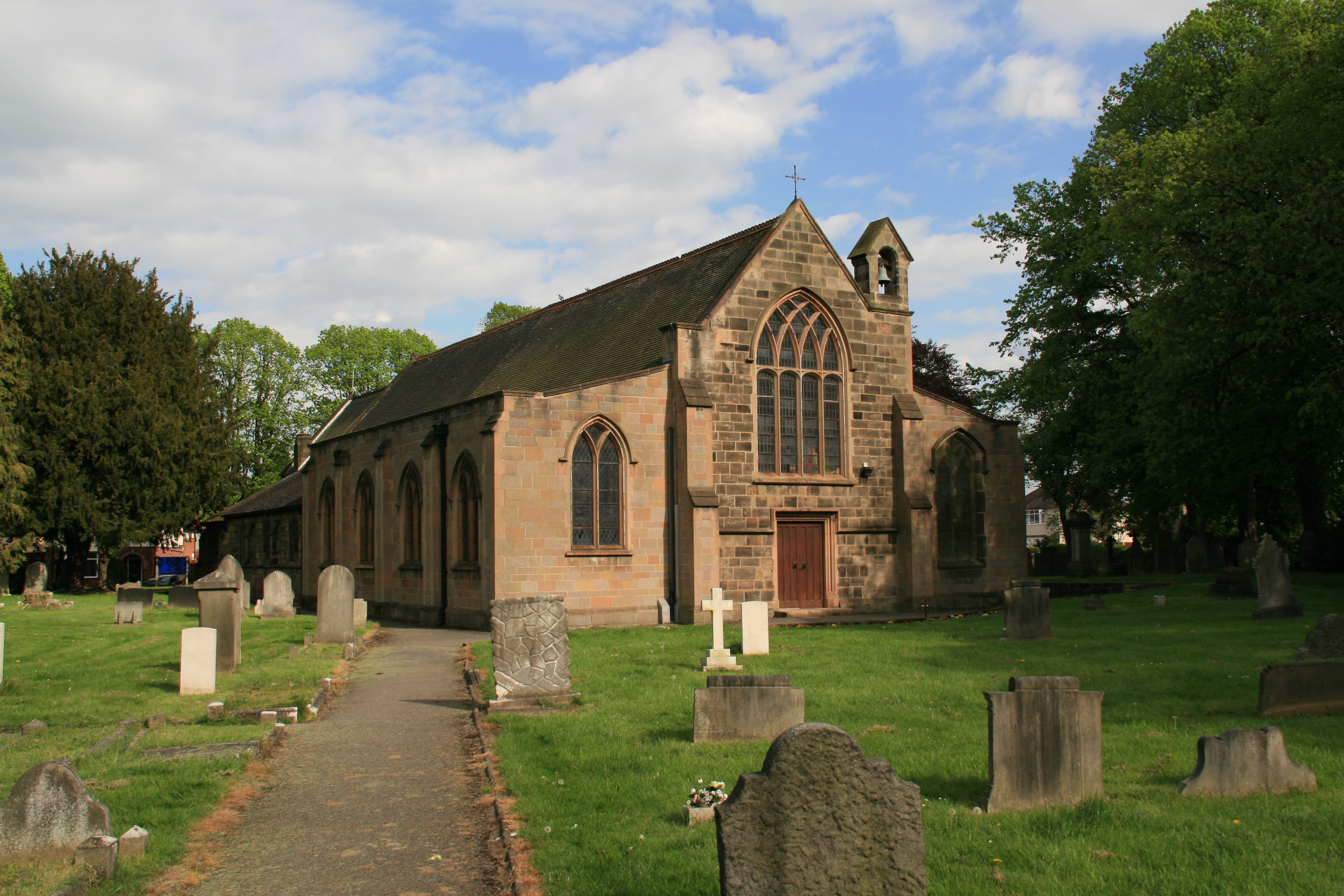
- Boulton St Mary’s Church
- Boulton St Mary’s Church
- 53°53′36.3″N 1°25′48.4″W
- OS grid reference: SK 38440 33038
- Location: Boulton, Derby
- Country: England
- Denomination: Church of England
- Churchmanship: Broad Church
- Website: Boulton St Mary’s webpage

History
- Dedication: St Mary the Virgin

Architecture
- Heritage designation: Grade II* listed

Administration
- Province: Canterbury
- Diocese: Derby
- Archdeaconry: Chesterfield
- Deanery: Melbourne
- Parish: Boulton

Clergy
- Abbot: Paul Baxter
- Vicar: Rev'd Phillipa Taylor

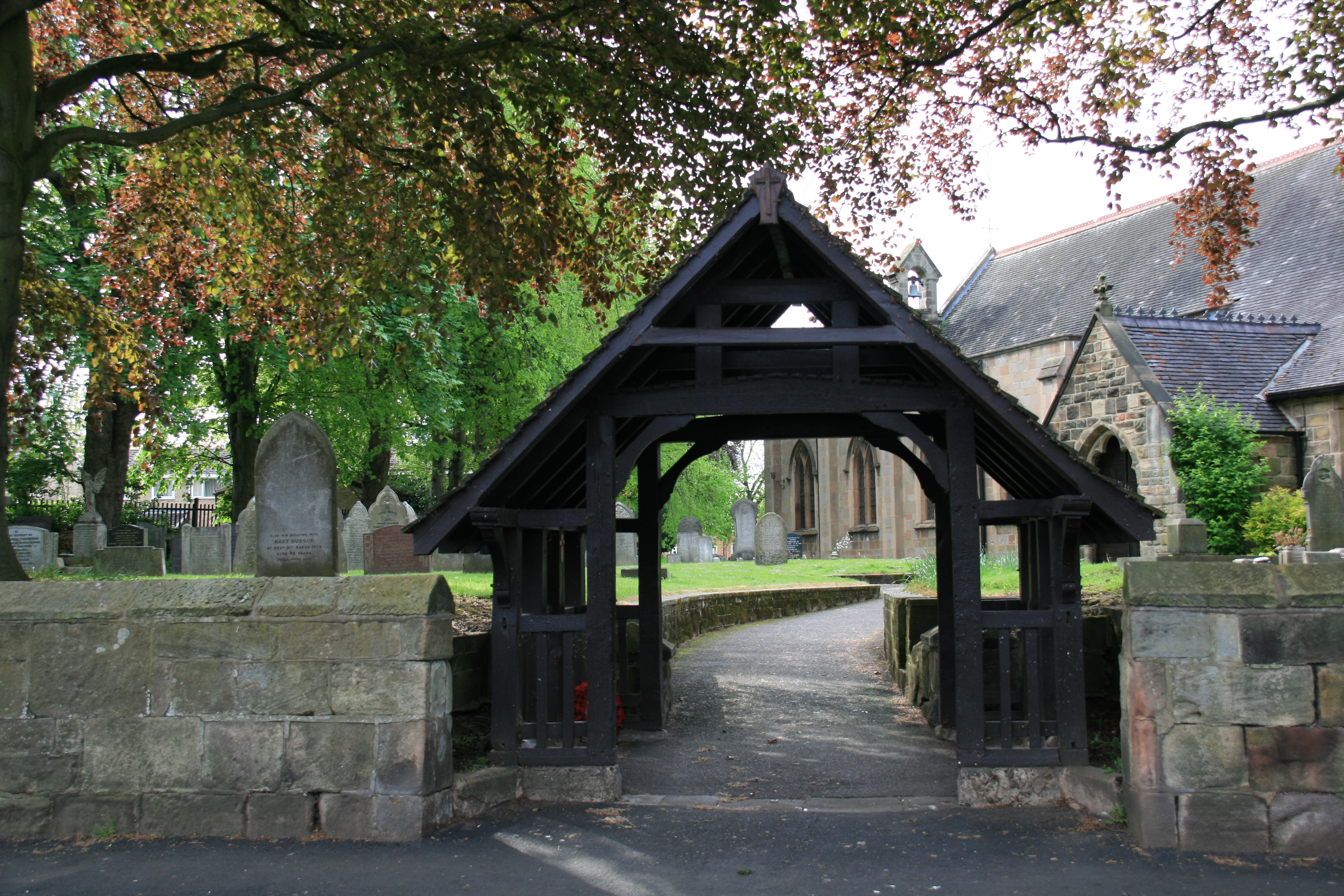
Lych-gate at Boulton St Mary's Church

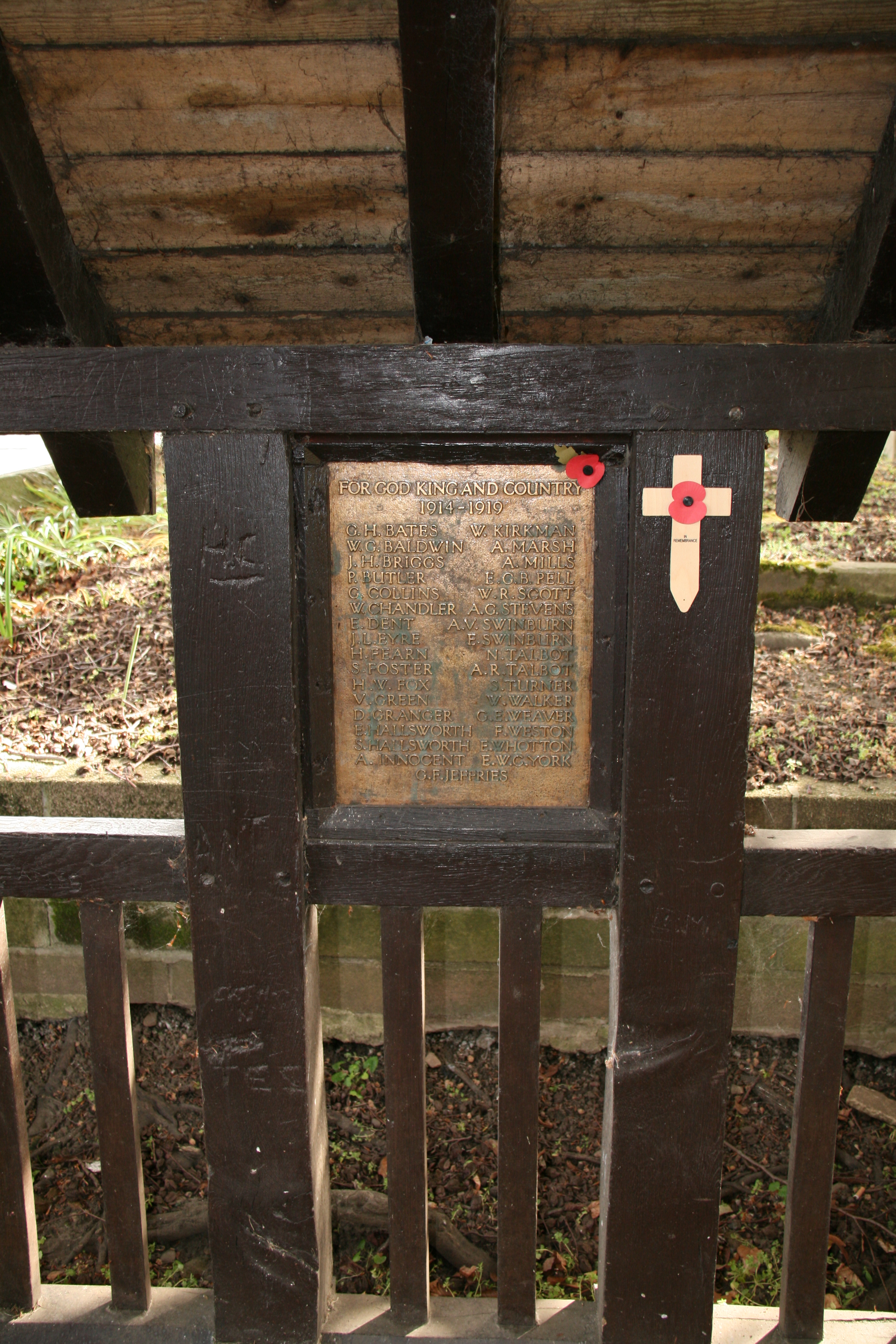
Great War Memorial on the Lych-gate At Boulton St Mary's

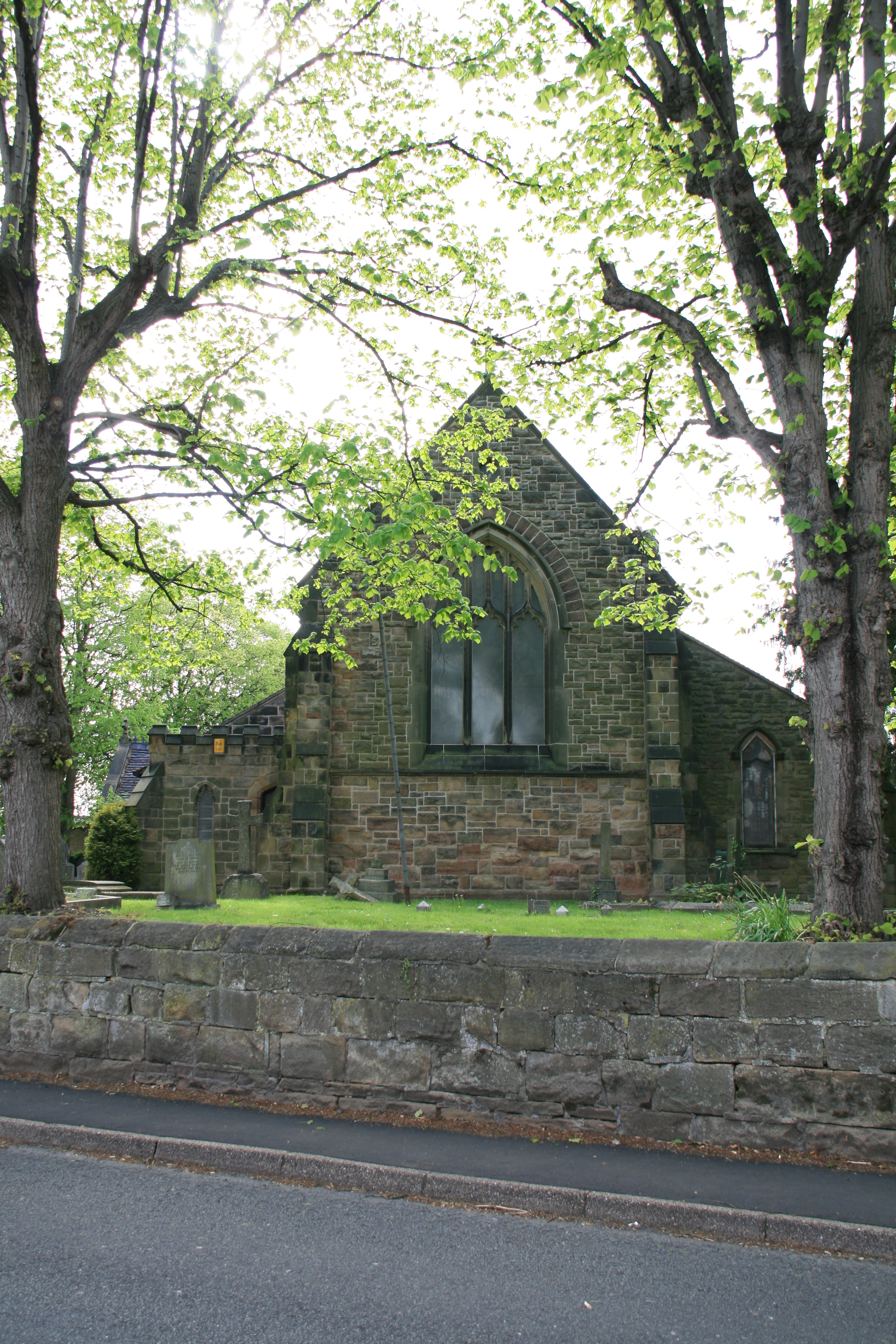
Boulton St Mary's Church as viewed from Boulton Lane

Boulton St Mary's is the Church of England parish church for the Boulton ward of Derby. It is located on Boulton Lane, Alvaston, Derby, Derbyshire, England. It is part of the Diocese of Derby. The church is dedicated to Saint Mary. The church is believed to date back to Norman times and is still in regular ecclesiastical use today.

== History Of The Church ==
The history of Boulton St. Mary's church is believed to date back to around 1150. The founder of the church is Robert Sacheverell of Hopwell (Sawley), a local Lord of the Manor of that time. In 1271, the church becomes the focus of a dispute between the Abbot of Darley and the Sacheverell family who wish to keep the church for the Manor of Boulton. A Court of Enquiry is convened to resolve this matter but it finds against the family and the church is designated as a chapel of St. Peter's Church in Derby. It continues to be a chapelry of St. Peter's church until 1865 when it was made into a parish church in its own right.

Boulton St. Mary's church is mentioned again in the Chantry Roll of 1547, where the founding of the church by Robert Sacheverell was mentioned.

The church is constructed of block sandstone, with a slate roof. In 1841, there was a major extension which increased the size of the west end nave by 12 feet, a vestry was added to the North side along with other alterations. In 1907, there was a further modification to the west end of the church, which included the construction of a twin bell turret.

In 1961, a further major extension to the church was undertaken. The foundation stone of the new extension was laid on 7 January 1961 by Miss Grace Robotham. As part of this extension and alterations a single bell turret was added over the west wall replacing the 1907 twin turret.

== The Lych-gate At The Church ==
The wooden Lych-gate, which now forms the main entrance to the church from Boulton Lane was constructed just after the first World War as a memorial to the local servicemen of Great War. The structure was built by Joseph Thomas Fisher, a local carpenter and joiner who also served in the Great War.

== The Church Today ==
Regular services are on Sunday mornings with Said Communion Service at 9am, and Morning Worship at 10:30am. There is also a Messy Church service held for families at 4pm on the second Sunday of each month, and a Prayze service with contemporary style worship at 7pm on the first Sunday of every month.

== See also ==
- Grade II* listed buildings in Derby
- Listed buildings in Boulton, Derby
