= Listed buildings in Boulton, Derby =

Boulton is an electoral ward in the city of Derby, England. The ward contains four listed buildings that are recorded in the National Heritage List for England. Of these, one is listed at Grade II*, the middle of the three grades, and the others are at Grade II, the lowest grade. The ward is a suburb of Derby to the southeast of its centre, and is largely residential. The listed buildings consist of a church, two houses, and stables and outbuildings.

== Key ==
| Grade | Criteria< |
|---|---|
| II* | Particularly important buildings of more than special interest. |
| II | Buildings of national importance and special interest. |

== Buildings ==
| Name and location | Photograph | Date | Notes | Grade |
|---|---|---|---|---|
| St Mary's Church; 52.89346°N 1.43010°W | | 12th century | The church has been altered and extended through the centuries, particularly in 1840, in 1870–71 and in about 1960. It is built in gritstone with tile roofs, and consists of a nave, north and south aisles, a south porch, a chancel with a northeast chapel and a southeast vestry, and a gabled bellcote at the west end. The porch has a cinquefoiled entrance arch, and the inner doorway is Norman; it has one order of colonnettes with scalloped capitals, chevrons, and cable moulding. The chancel has angle buttresses and a three-light Perpendicular window. | II* |
| Alvaston Fields; 52.89029°N 1.43176°W | — | 18th century | A farmhouse, later a private house, in red brick, partly stuccoed, with a moulded eaves cornice and a slate roof. There are three storeys and a front of three bays. On the south front are two square bay windows, and the west front contains a round-arched doorway and a large round-arched window to the right. The windows in the upper floors are sashes, those in the middle floor with channelled wedge lintels and keystones. | II |
| Stables and outbuildings, Alvaston Fields; 52.89058°N 1.43229°W | — | Late 18th century | The stables and outbuildings, later used for other purposes, are in red brick on a rendered plinth, with a cogged eaves cornice and tile roofs, hipped to the south. There are two storeys and an L-shaped plan, with two ranges at right angles. The west wing has six bays, it contains doorways and sash windows with cambered heads, and an arched doorway with double doors. In the south wing is a large arched carriage way. | II |
| Nunsfield House; 52.89407°N 1.42796°W | | 1828 | The house, later used for other purposes, is in stone, with a channelled sill band, plain eaves, and a hipped slate roof. There are two storeys and three bays. On the front is a porch with unfluted Doric columns, a triglyph frieze, a cornice, and a doorway with a rectangular fanlight. The windows are sashes. | II |
