= Port Marine, Portishead =

Neighbourhood of Portishead, England

Coordinates: 51.488°N 2.757°W

Port Marine
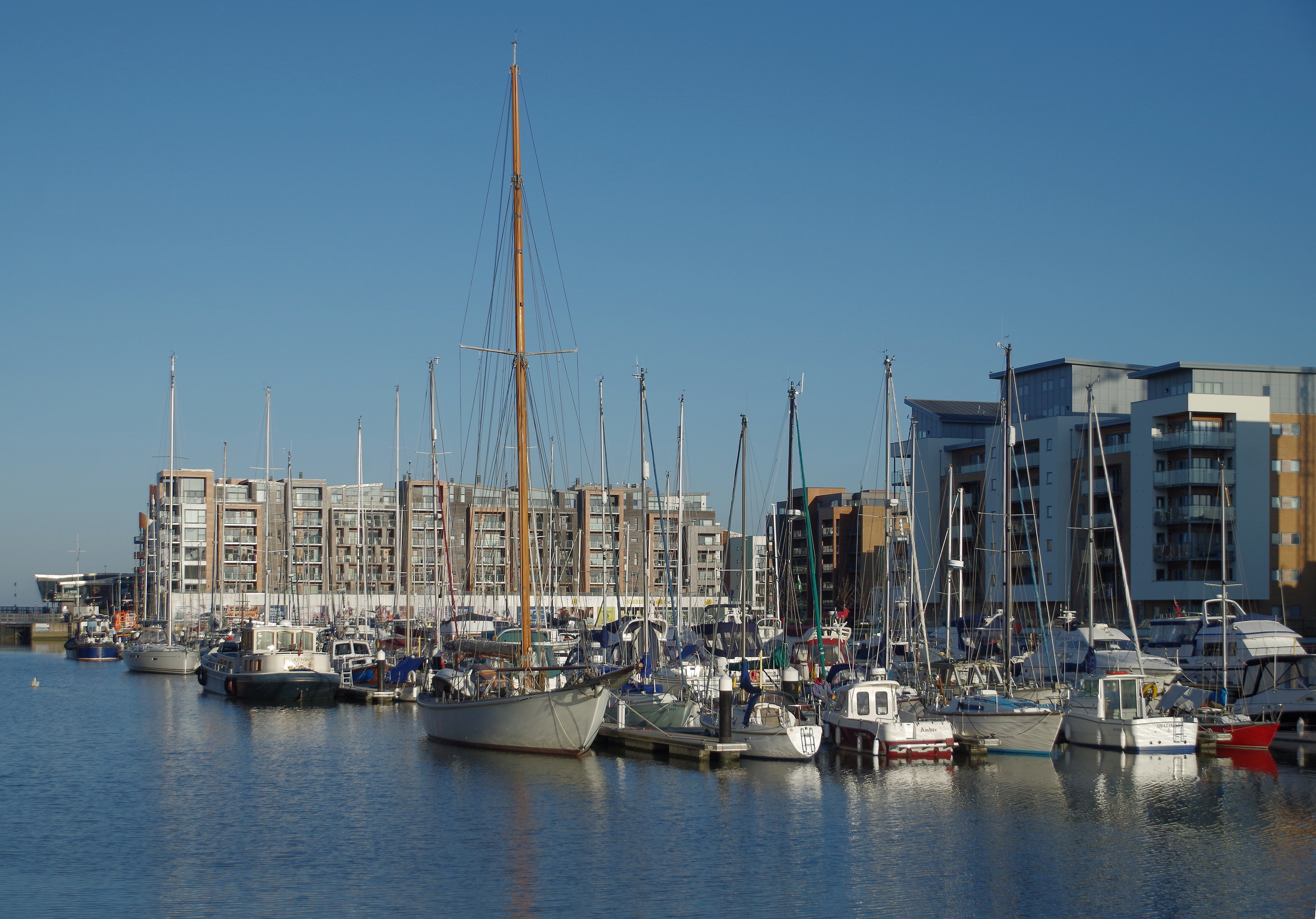
- A view of Portishead Quays Marina and adjacent residential buildings belonging to the Port Marine development.

- Location within Somerset
- Civil parish: Portishead
- Unitary authority: North Somerset
- Ceremonial county: Somerset
- Region: South West
- Country: England
- Sovereign state: United Kingdom
- Post town: BRISTOL
- Postcode district: BS20
- Dialling code: 01275
- Police: Avon and Somerset
- Fire: Avon
- Ambulance: South Western
- UK Parliament: North Somerset

Port Marine (sometimes branded Portishead Quays) is a mixed-use, waterfront neighbourhood in the town of Portishead in North Somerset and an exurb of Bristol. Masterplanned during the late 1990s on the docklands and power station brownfield beside the Severn Estuary, the area now contains 3420 dwellings, a 133-berth marina, commercial and retail space, a nature reserve, and a sculpture trail. Port Marine has been cited as an exemplar of brownfield suburban regeneration and received a CABE Building for Life Gold award in 2004. It was one of several high-density developments in Portishead to significantly expand the town's urban area and push its population past 27,000.

== History ==
=== Industrial origins ===
A deep-water dock was excavated on the site in the 1830s to handle ocean-going cargo vessels, catalysing local ship-breaking, brick-making and fishing trades. Two coal-fired power stations ("A" 1929; "B" 1955) and the Albright & Wilson phosphorus works dominated the waterfront during the 20th century until economic decline led to sequential closures; the last turbines were demolished and the dock formally closed in 1992.

=== Redevelopment (1990s–present) ===
Outline consent for a comprehensive redevelopment, marketed as Port Marine, was granted in 1997; Crest Nicholson and Persimmon Homes led a consortium with North Somerset Council and Bristol City Council to prepare the detailed masterplan approved in 2002 (revised 2005). Construction gathered pace after 2000, the £100 million first phase opening the marina basin, residential quays and a Waitrose food store. By 2010 more than 2,000 homes, public squares and quayside cafes had been occupied, while subsequent infill produced high-rise apartment blocks such as Ninety4 on the Estuary.

== Planning and design ==
The scheme covers 221 hectares and is arranged as a sequence of terraces, crescents and quaysides with a hierarchy of public, semi-private and private open spaces. Different architectural practices were commissioned for individual areas, ranging from a Dutch-inspired streetscape to a contemporary fishing village of narrow, colour-washed streets.

Approximately 3,420 dwellings were constructed at an average net density of 45 dwellings per hectare, including around 300 affordable units; EcoHomes "Good" or better is standard in the area, with an additional 30 dwellings reaching "Excellent". Non-residential elements comprise 69,680 m² of employment space, 60,390 m² of retail and leisure uses, Portishead Library, Trinity Anglican-Methodist Primary School, and a health centre.

== Amenities and environment ==
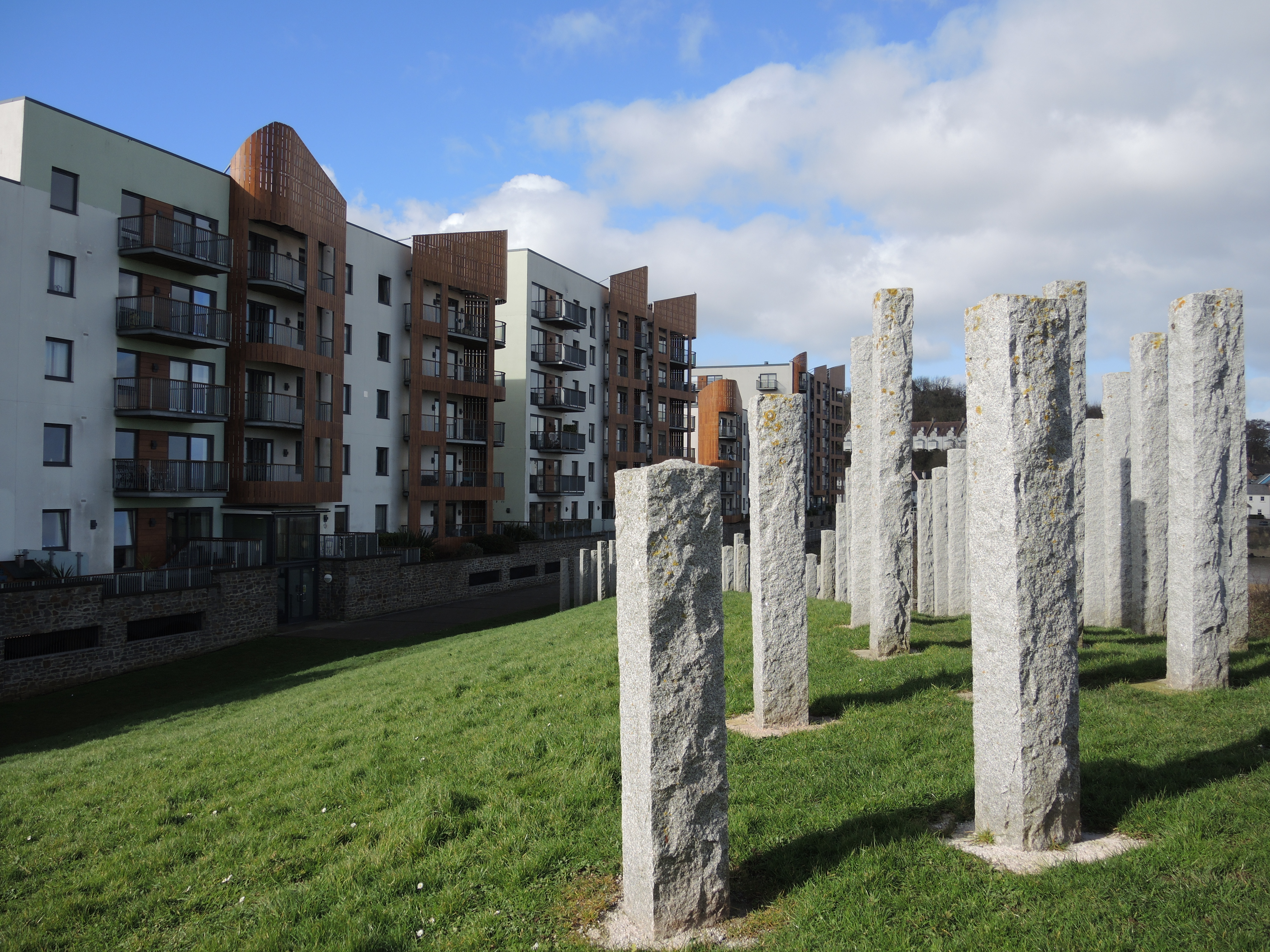
An example of public art and high-rise residential buildings in the area. The artwork pictured is Full Fathom Five by Michael Dan Archer.

The 5.7-hectare marina, now branded as Portishead Quays Marina, accommodates yachts and cabin cruisers and is ringed by restaurants and cafés. Public art was also introduced as part of the development, with more than 25 commissioned sculptures and installations forming the Port Marine art Trail from Battery Point to the nature reserve. The Portbury Wharf Nature Reserve itself lies next to the southwest of the housing and encompasses a 47-hectare area, created as ecological mitigation for the development and funded through a residents’ levy; species recorded include otter, water vole and great-crested newt.

== Infrastructure and transport ==
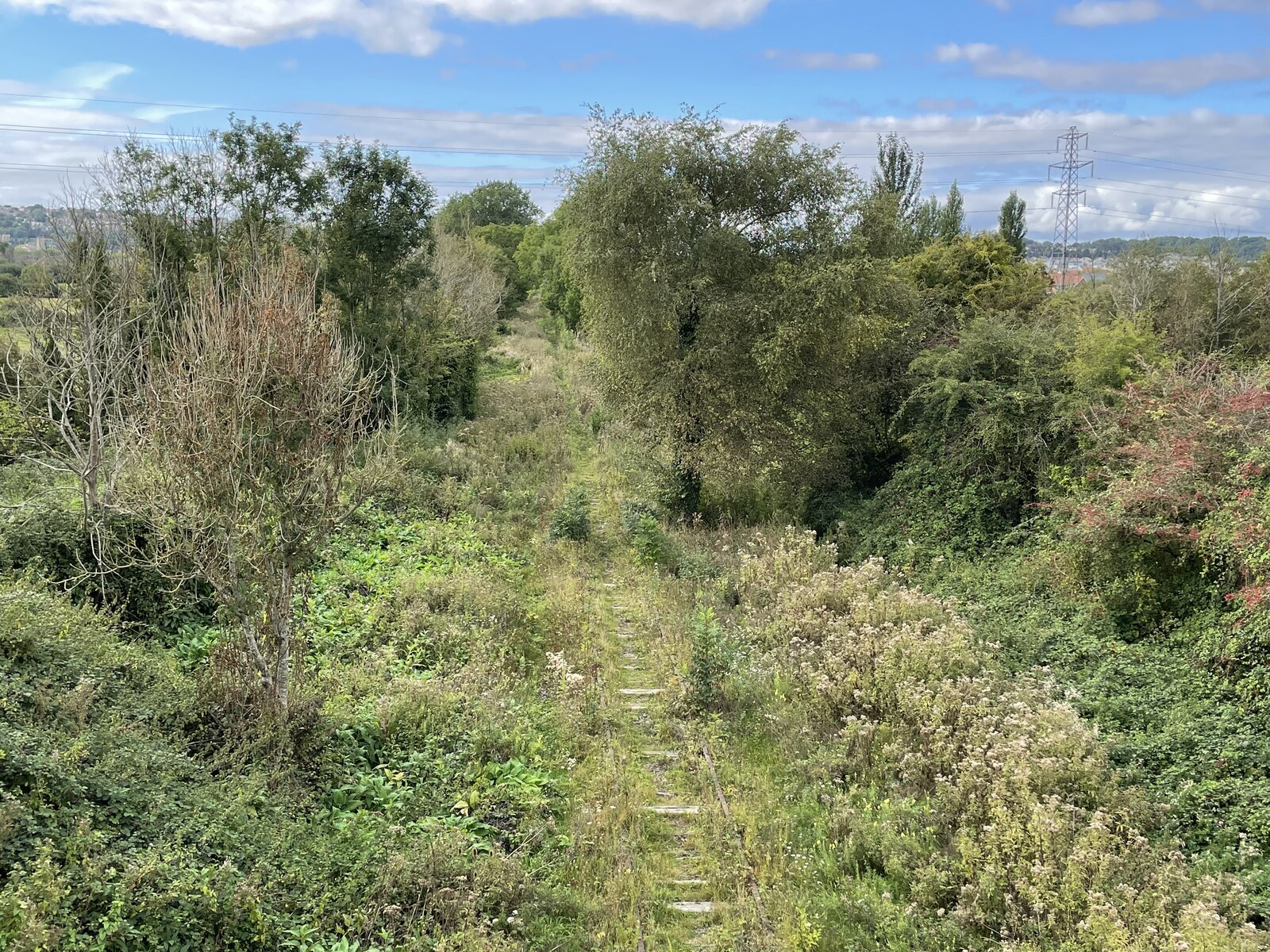
Remnant of an embankment for the Portishead railway near Sheepway that proposals aim to reinstate.

Port Marine is 5 km from the M5 motorway, linked by the a369 Wyndham Way and commuter bus services to Bristol city centre and Bristol Temple Meads. Waterfront promenades connect the marina and surrounding housing to Portishead's High Street; several vehicular bridges also span the dock entrance, two of which—Schweich Bridge and Den Dungen Bridge—are named after Portishead's twin towns, Schweich and Den Dungen respectively.

The 2022 Community Character Statement published by North Somerset Council notes that unclear signage around Wyndham Way and the former railway crossing often leaves visitors unable to find Port Marine’s marina and car parks without detours via Harbour Road or Newfoundland Way, highlighting the need for improved directions and signage for the waterfront.

Reopening the former Portishead railway to serve the town and estate has been proposed. Under a 2002 planning agreement, Crest Nicholson committed £1 million to fund a feasibility study on reinstating the Portishead branch line. The addition of several thousand homes at Port Marine helped push the town’s population beyond 27,000, which the MetroWest project saw as warranting the reinstatement of the railway.

== Governance and issues ==
In 2004, at a time when Port Marine and adjacent developments were just beginning to have residents move in, a Home Office proposal to interview asylum seekers at an office adjacent to the neighbouring Vale estate provoked local protests that were criticised as racist in the national press.

Service charges for the small pockets of private estate land retained by managing agent FirstPort rose sharply during the 2010s, prompting the formation of the Port Marine Management Charge Action Group and an adjournment debate led in 2024 by Liam Fox in Parliament that described the arrangement as "fleecehold". Fire-safety defects (combustible balconies and missing cavity barriers) identified in several post-2010 apartment blocks led to waking watch costs and remediation claims against developers and warranty providers.
