= Edward Thornewill =

English cricketer and racehorse owner

Personal information
- Full name: Edward John Thornewill
- Born: 3 April 1836; Newton, Derbyshire, England
- Died: 22 March 1901 (aged 64); Algiers, French Algeria
- Batting: Unknown

Domestic team information
- Years: Team
- 1856: Cambridge University

Career statistics
Competition	First-class
Matches	1
Runs scored	1
Batting average	0.50
100s/50s	–/–
Top score	1
Catches/stumpings	–/–
- Source: Cricinfo, 26 January 2023

Edward John Thornewill (3 April 1836 – 22 March 1901) was an English racehorse owner and, in his youth, a cricketer who played in one first-class cricket match for Cambridge University in 1856. His birthplace is disputed: in one source, he was born at "Newton, Derbyshire", which may also mean Newton Solney; in another, he was born at the family home, Dovecliff Hall, at Stretton, Staffordshire. He died at Algiers, Algeria.

Thornewill was the son of another Edward Thornewill and the grandson of the Staffordshire ironmaster Thomas Thornewill; he was educated at Harrow School and at Trinity College, Cambridge. There is no record that he played cricket at Harrow, and his one game for Cambridge University was the 1856 University Match against Oxford University, when he batted at No 11 in the first Cambridge innings, scoring 1, and then opened the batting in the second innings and was out without scoring. He did, however, play in minor matches after leaving Cambridge University as a middle-order batsman, though he did not play any further first-class cricket.

Thornewill graduated from Cambridge University in 1858 with a Bachelor of Arts degree. He went into business as a corn merchant in Liverpool and became well known as a racehorse owner. He was the owner of Gamecock, the horse that won the 1887 Grand National, although contemporary reports ascribed the ownership to a "Mr E. Jay".
