= Alvaston =

Village in Derbyshire, England

Coordinates: 52.89754°N 1.42319°W

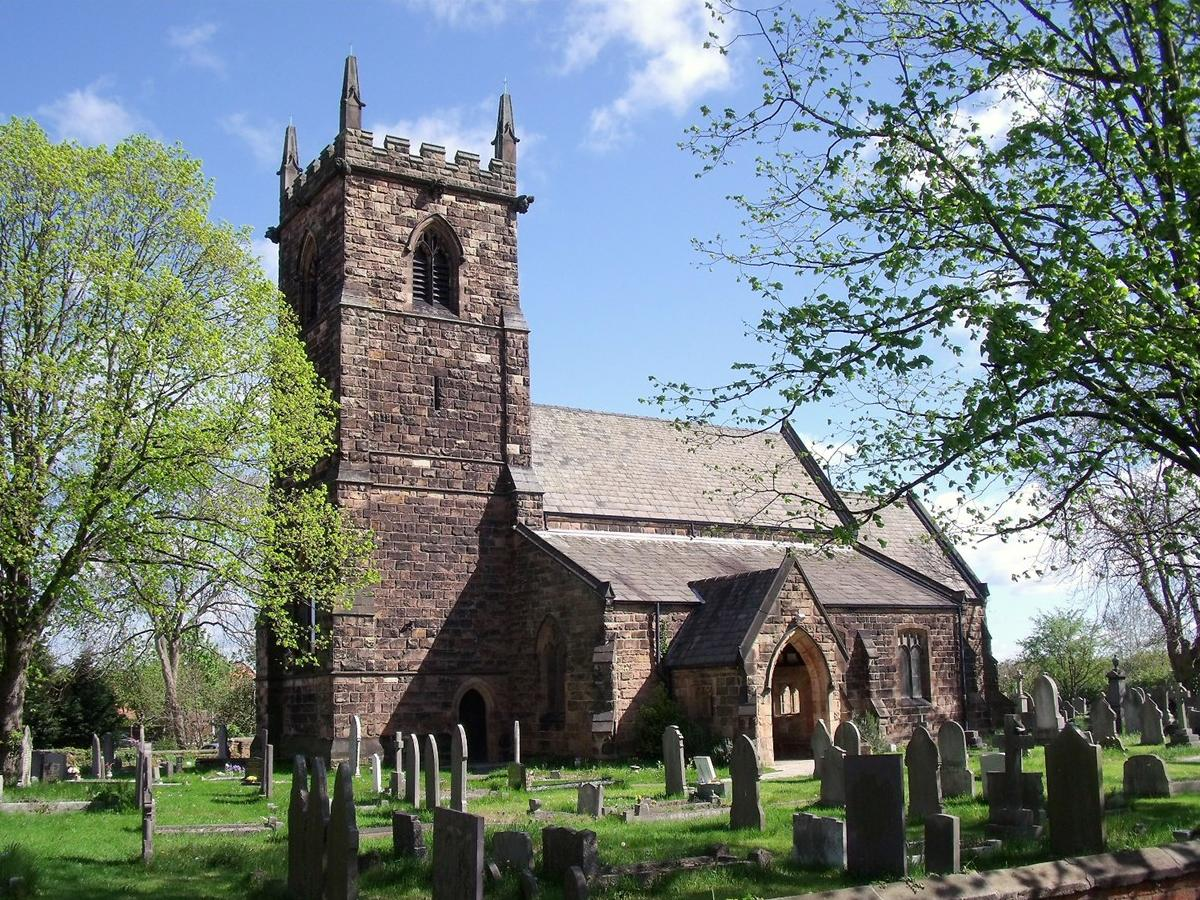
- St Michael and All Angels' Church

- Location within Derbyshire
- Population: 16,255 (2011 Census)
- OS grid reference: SK345395
- Unitary authority: Derby
- Ceremonial county: Derbyshire
- Region: East Midlands
- Country: England
- Sovereign state: United Kingdom
- Post town: DERBY
- Postcode district: DE24
- Dialling code: 01332
- Police: Derbyshire
- Fire: Derbyshire
- Ambulance: East Midlands
- UK Parliament: Derby South

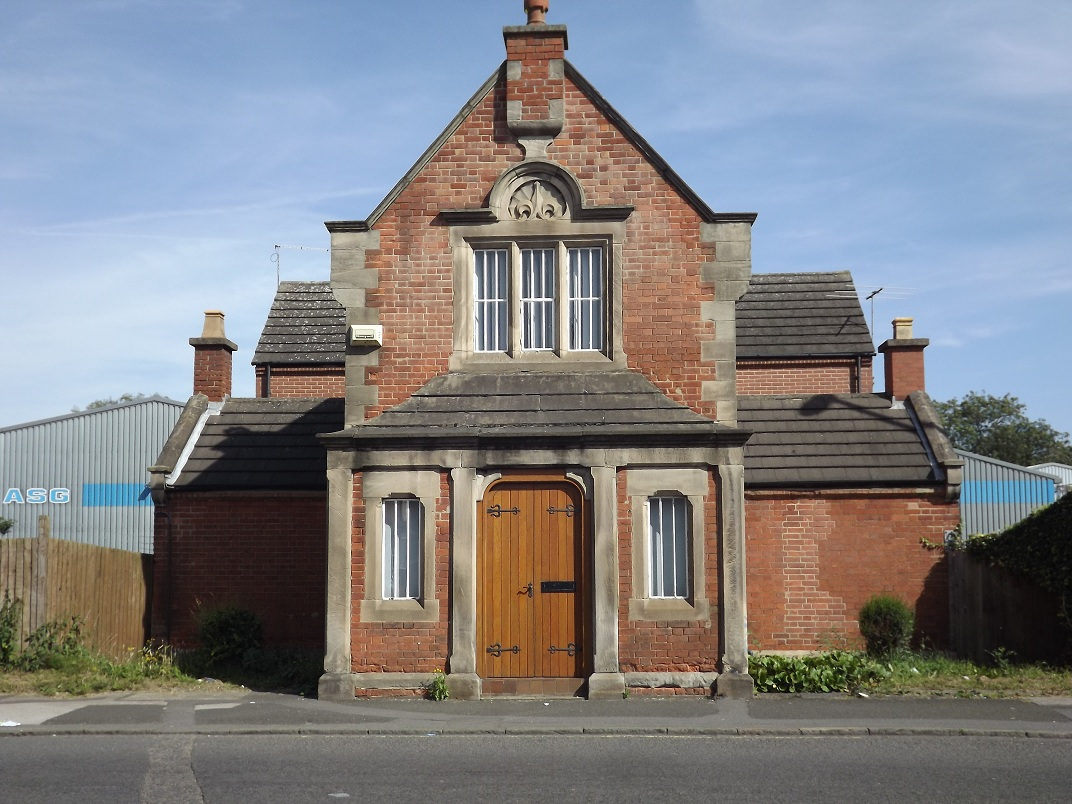
Former Road Toll House on London Road

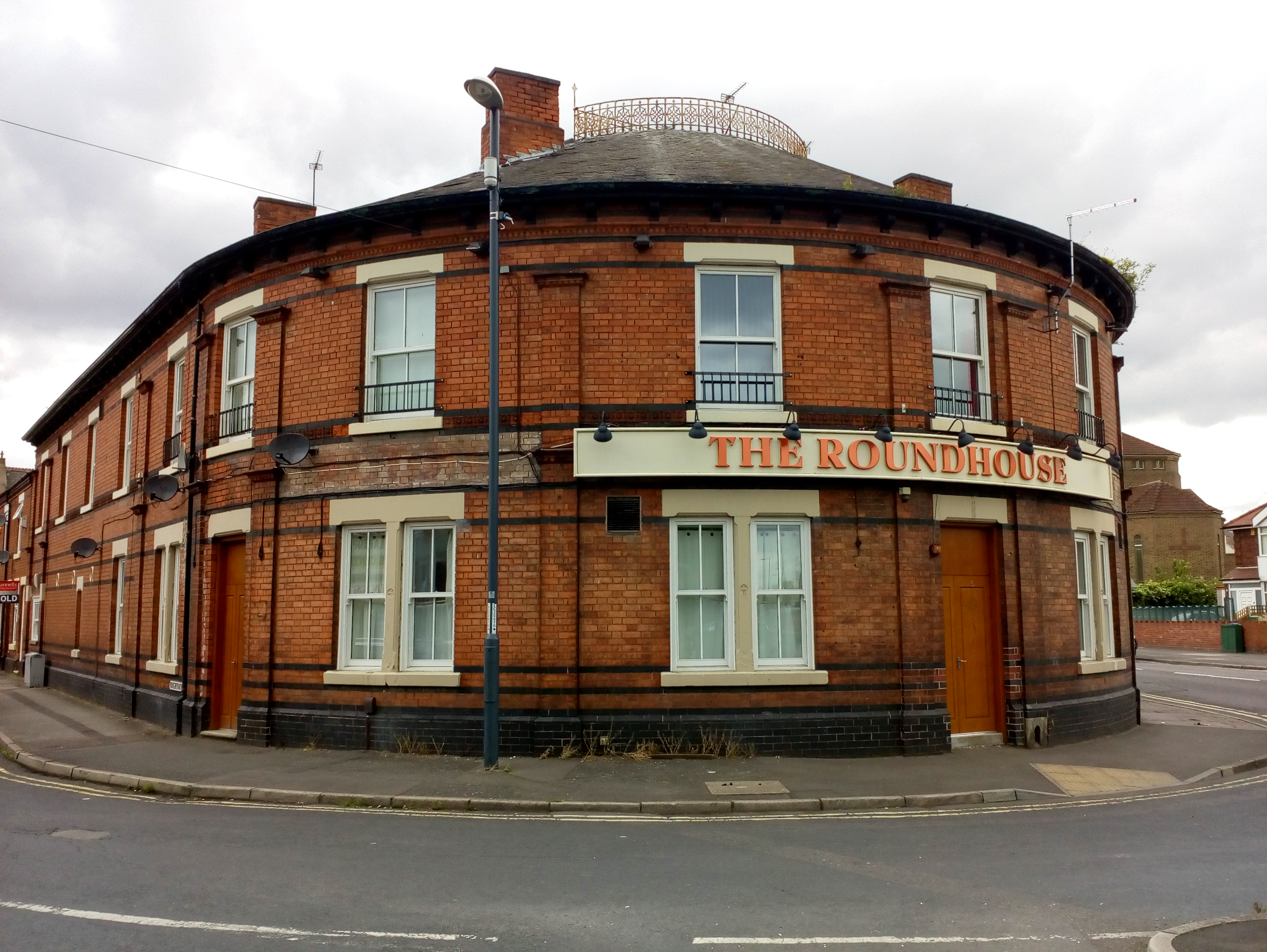
The Roundhouse (was a pub)

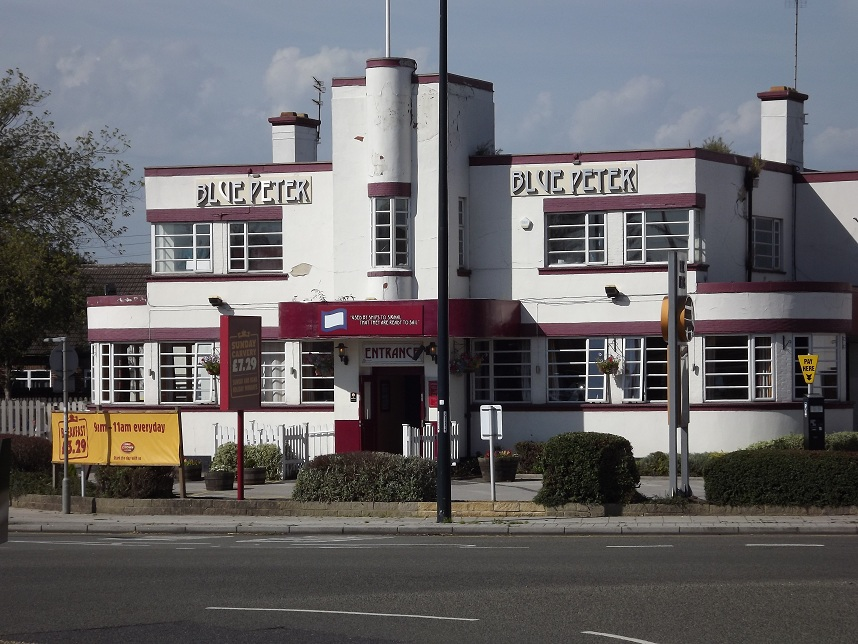
Blue Peter pub

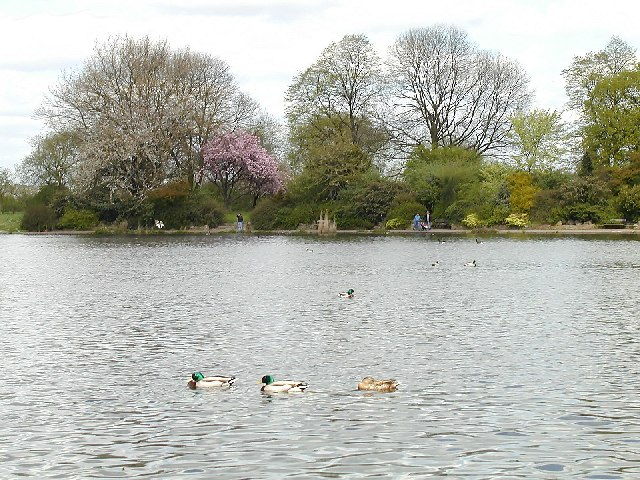
Alvaston Lake

Alvaston (/ˈɒlvəstən/ or /ˈælvəstən/) (Note: Ellis's On Early English Pronunciation p.36 gave the contemporary local pronunciation in the village in 1869 as /ˈɔːvəstən/ with the /l/ elided.) is a village and ward of Derby, in the ceremonial county of Derbyshire, England. Alvaston is on the A6 three miles south-east of Derby city centre and probably owes its name to an individual called Ælfwald.

The village of Alvaston has existed since at least the 11th century. Rapid expansion came in the second half of the 19th century and in 1904 the electric tram replaced the horse-drawn omnibus service and, with the advent of the motor car, London Road became the A6. It became part of Derby in the late 20th century.

The smaller, neighbouring village of Boulton has been swallowed up by Alvaston, and Boulton is rarely referred to by name.

== History ==
The village is recorded in the Domesday Book of 1086. It expanded rapidly with the coming of improved public transport to Derby, and the arrival of the railways and associated employment in the mid-19th century. Alvaston was the terminus of a tram route, and later a trolleybus route, which ran along London Road.

Few of the buildings in Alvaston date from before this era. There are several parallel streets of terraced Victorian housing in the Crewton district, large Edwardian detached villas stringing out away from the village centre, 1930s semi-detached homes, and a large expanse of post-Second World War council housing.

== Governance ==
Alvaston is part of the Derby South constituency for Westminster elections.

In the 2023 Derby City Council election, all 6 of Alvaston's members of Derby City Council were from Reform UK.

In 1881 the civil parish had a population of 1302. On 25 March 1884 the parish was abolished to form Alvaston and Boulton, part also went to Elvaston. It is now in the unparished area of Derby, in the Derby district.

== Geography ==
Alvaston lies to the southeast of Derby city centre, bounded to the east by the A6 dual carriageway, and to the north by the River Derwent. It is bordered to the north by the wards of Chaddesden East, Chaddesden West and Spondon; to the west by the city centre, Sinfin and Osmaston; to the south by Chellaston and Shelton Lock; and to the east by the district of South Derbyshire.

Two miles to the west lies the site of the Derby Canal, the 19th-century township of Allenton, and the Osmaston Park Industrial Estate. To the north-west on the A6 towards Derby, a small settlement of Victorian terraced homes forms Wilmorton. The Pride Park development, which includes the Derby County football stadium, is a short walk away. To the north, the River Derwent flows from Derby towards its confluence with the River Trent. The long-established chemical works of Celenese(formally Accordis and Courtaulds) are the northern bank, towards Spondon. To the east lies the open countryside of South Derbyshire and Elvaston Castle Country Park, a favourite place for picnics and lakeside walks. To the south, Boulton Moor stretches towards Chellaston and Aston-on-Trent. Perched on the edge of the settlement, on Stocker Flat and overlooking Boulton Moor may be found a maze of 1970s–1980s-built culs-de-sac and footpaths, leading to council and privately built homes.

== Demography ==
At the 2011 census the population of Alvaston was 16,255 and is made up of approximately 50% females and 50% males. The average age of people in Alvaston is 37 (2011 Census). 87.5% of people living in Alvaston were born in England. Other top answers for country of birth were 1.1% Scotland, 0.9% India, 0.8% Ireland, 0.6% Jamaica, 0.5% Pakistan, 0.5% Philippines, 0.5% Northern Ireland, 0.5% Wales, 0.4% Zimbabwe. (2011 Census) 93.6% of people living in Alvaston speak English. The other top languages spoken are 1.6% Polish, 0.4% Panjabi, 0.4% Urdu, 0.4% Tagalog/Filipino, 0.3% Russian, 0.3% Czech, 0.2% Kurdish, 0.2% Latvian, 0.2% Italian. (2011 Census) The religious make up of Alvaston is 53.6% Christian, 34.0% No religion, 2.5% Muslim, 1.2% Sikh, 0.4% Hindu, 0.3% Buddhist, 0.1% Jewish. (2011 Census)

== Economy ==
Alvaston is mainly residential. The main shopping centre of Alvaston can be found at the junction of the A6 London Road and the A5111 Derby Ring Road. Alvaston shopping centre holds a small number of chain and independent shops, including a men's barbers, and two card shops In recent years, a lot of independent shops have closed down and have been replaced with many takeaways.

== Culture and community ==
The main parks are Alvaston Park, Keldholme Lane Park and Kiwi Park.

Alvaston Park is a picturesque, riverside park covering 85 acres. As well as the sports facilities mentioned below, it has a lake with fishing and a model boat club, a science garden, play area and a new café. The park opened to the public in 1913 after William Curzon of Breedon Hall made some of his land available. It was landscaped by William Barron and Son of Borrowash – a firm founded by the young Scotsman who laid out the park at Elvaston Castle for Lord Harrington in 1830. A five-acre lake was added in 1923 but in 1934 it was found to be badly polluted and the town council had to urgently clear Cotton Brook to restore the water purity of the lake in time for the carnival. During the Second World War the park was used as a prisoner of war camp, part of which was for Germans and the other for Italians. The Italians worked in the fields of local farmers and the Germans worked at the ordnance depot on Sinfin Lane. A further 61.8 acres was added after the Second World War for use as playing fields.

== Landmarks ==
Aside from the church, listed buildings in the village include Church Farm and its associated cottages on Church Street, which date to the early 16th or early 17th century. There is another Grade-II-listed farmhouse dating from the 18th century on Boulton Lane. The Poplars, in Ellastone Gardens, is a Grade-II Georgian building with an iron shield of arms on the side elevation.

== Transport ==
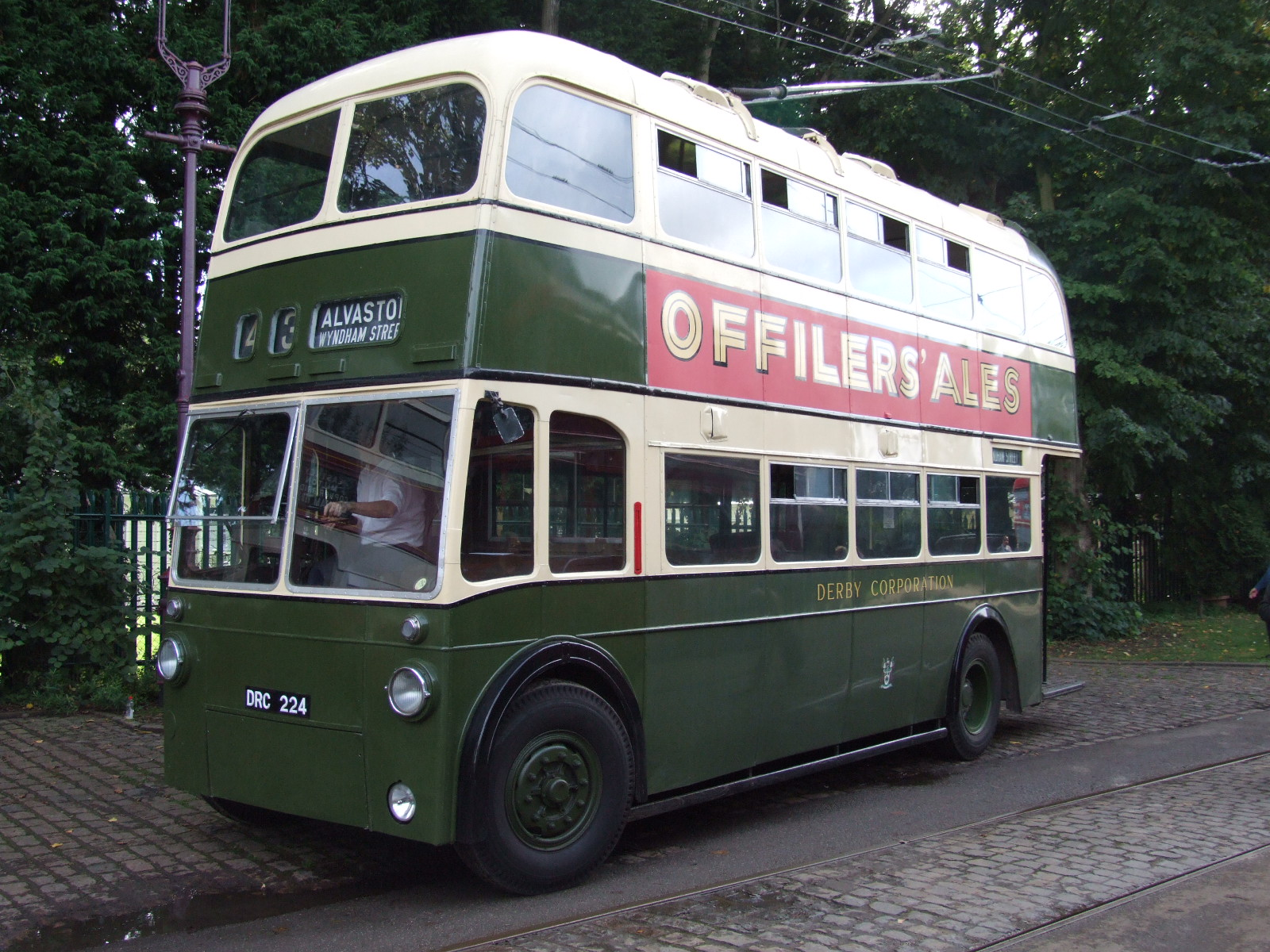
A preserved trolleybus showing Alvaston as its destination

=== Bus routes ===
- ARRIVA DERBY – 1A, 1C, 1B – Derby > Alvaston Circular (1C, 1A) / Pride Park > Alvaston > Boulton Moor > Chellaston > Holbrook Park (1B)
- ARRIVA DERBY – 4 – Derby > Allenton > Alvaston Blue Peter > Derby Commercial Park
- KINCHBUS – Skylink – Derby > Alvaston > Shardlow > Castle Donington > East Midlands Airport > East Midlands Gateway > Kegworth > Hathern > Loughborough > Birstall > Leicester
- DIAMOND BUS EAST MIDLANDS - 70, 70A - Derby > Allenton > Shelton Lock > Chellaston > Barrow upon Trent > Weston-on-Trent > Aston-on-Trent > Alvaston > Derby (70; 70A runs in opposite direction)

== Education ==
Alvaston has two secondary schools: Noel-Baker Academy and Alvaston Moor Academy. The suburb has several primary schools, Wyndham Primary Academy, notably Alvaston Junior Community School (AJCS), St John Fisher and Oakwood infant and junior school.

== Religious sites ==
There are several churches, of Anglican, Baptist, Methodist, United Reformed and Roman Catholic denominations.

There are two Anglican churches: St Michael and All Angels' Church is at the heart of the old village of Alvaston, serving the ecclesiastical parish of Alvaston, which includes Boulton Moor; and Boulton St. Mary's Church which is thought to be of Norman origin.

Alvaston Baptist Church	Alvaston Methodist Church	Alvaston Parish Church	Boulton St Mary's Church	English Martyrs Roman Catholic Church

== Sport and recreation ==
There are recreation grounds on Field Lane and Elvaston Lane.

Alvaston & Boulton Cricket Club (est. 1857) is an English amateur cricket club that is based on the Raygar Ground, on the Raynesway bypass. Alvaston & Boulton have 4 Saturday senior XI teams that compete in the Derbyshire County Cricket League, and they became Premier league champions in 2000. The club have a mixed Development Team which takes part in the Derbyshire Cricket Foundation Competitions which are run by the club and a Women's team. Their junior section play competitive cricket in the Derby and District Youth League.

Charlie Keetley scored 80 goals for the football club in the 1926–27 season, before going on to play for Leeds and Bradford. Alvaston Park has a National Standard BMX track, which has hosted regional and national race meetings, as well as pitches and a skateboard park and adiZone outdoor gym. On 7 December 2009 the deputy mayor of Derby Councillor Fareed Hussain opened an outdoor gymnasium called the AdiZone and new changing rooms were opened on 2 May 2011.

Since 25 May 2019 Alvaston Park has hosted a weekly 5 km Parkrun.

== Climate ==
Climate data for Alvaston
Month	Jan	Feb	Mar	Apr	May	Jun	Jul	Aug	Sep	Oct	Nov	Dec	Year
Mean daily maximum °C (°F)	7 (45)	7 (45)	9 (48)	12 (54)	15 (59)	18 (64)	21 (70)	21 (70)	18 (64)	14 (57)	10 (50)	7 (45)	13 (55)
Mean daily minimum °C (°F)	1 (34)	1 (34)	2 (36)	4 (39)	6 (43)	9 (48)	11 (52)	11 (52)	9 (48)	7 (45)	4 (39)	2 (36)	6 (43)
Average precipitation mm (inches)	84 (3.3)	60 (2.4)	67 (2.6)	57 (2.2)	48 (1.9)	55 (2.2)	50 (2.0)	55 (2.2)	60 (2.4)	60 (2.4)	70 (2.8)	80 (3.1)	746 (29.4)
Source: Met Office

== Notable people ==
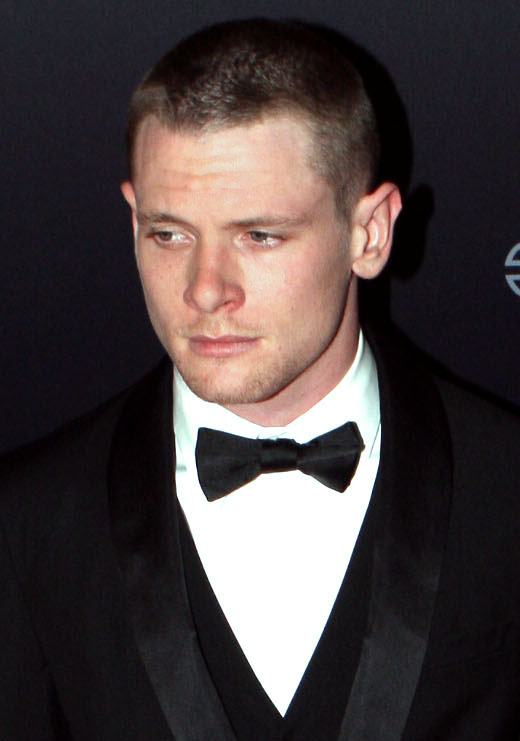
Jack O'Connell, 2014

- The Allestry family, William Allestry (1588–1655), Roger Allestry, (ca. 1620 – 1665) & William Allestry (ca. 1642 – ca. 1700) were all MP's for Derby
- William Raynes (1871–1966), local politician, MP for Derby, alderman and Mayor of Derby.
- Dame Glenda Bailey (born 1958), editor-in-chief of Harper’s Bazaar, from 2001 to 2020.
- Christopher Jackson (born 1977), a geoscientist and science communicator.
- Jack O'Connell (born 1990), actor who has appeared in This Is England (2006), Skins (2009–10), and Unbroken (2014)

=== Sport ===
- Tony Hateley (1941–2014), footballer who played 451 games, was Chelsea's record signing in 1966, father of Mark Hateley
- Mark Hateley (born 1961), footballer who played 500 games and 32 for England
- Craig Ramage (born 1970), footballer who played 222 games, beginning at Derby County
- Steve Elliott (born 1978), footballer who played 492 games beginning with Derby County
- Jordon Mutch (born 1991), footballer who played over 230 games including for Crystal Palace
