= Michael Dan Archer =

British sculptor

Michael Dan Archer FRSS (born 1955) is a Scottish sculptor and teacher. His sculptures, some on a large scale, stand in many locations in Britain and abroad.

== Life ==
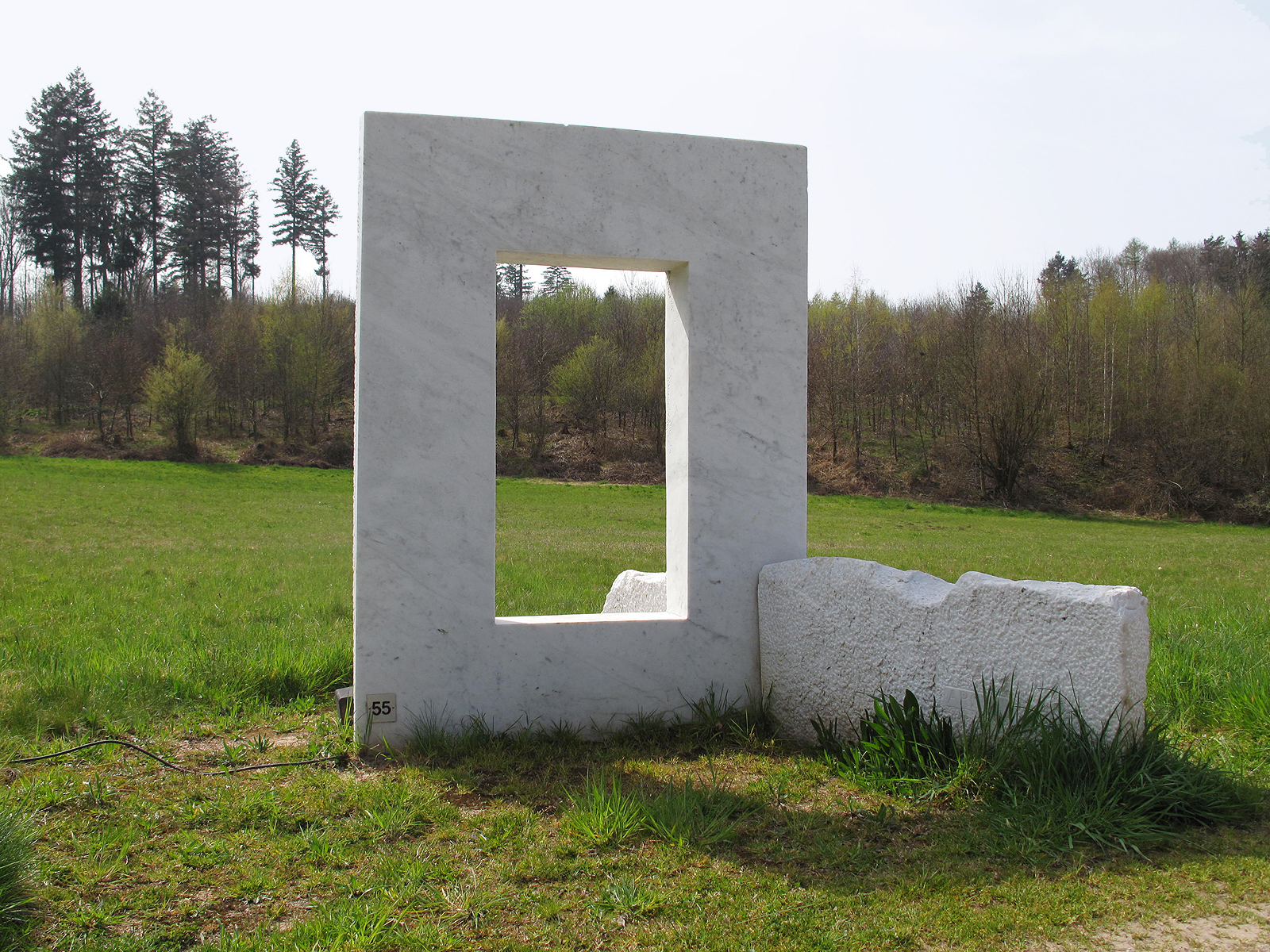
"Silent", in Skulpturenpark Durbach, Germany

Archer was born in Glasgow, and studied at the Coventry School of Art and Design from 1975 to 1979. For several years he taught English in Japan and Spain. He has exhibited in Britain and in many other countries. He has had visiting lectureships at Coventry College of Art and Derby College of Art and Technology; he was an academic at Loughborough University School of Art and Design, retiring from his post there as Senior Lecturer in Fine Art after 30 years. He is a Fellow of the Royal Society of Sculptors.

== Works ==
Archer's works include the following:

"Gateway" is a sculpture in Woodmere Drive, Chesterfield, Derbyshire, commissioned by Chesterfield Borough Council and unveiled in 2002. There is a granite doorway or portal, and two cast iron crucibles, the portal representing transition and the crucibles representing transformation.

"Transpose", of 2002, is a sculpture in Sutton, London, in Langley Park Road. It was commissioned by Chartwell Land, B&Q and Sutton London Borough Council. It is a stainless steel obelisk, height 7 metres (23 ft), in the shape of a thin sail, with a separate granite panel.

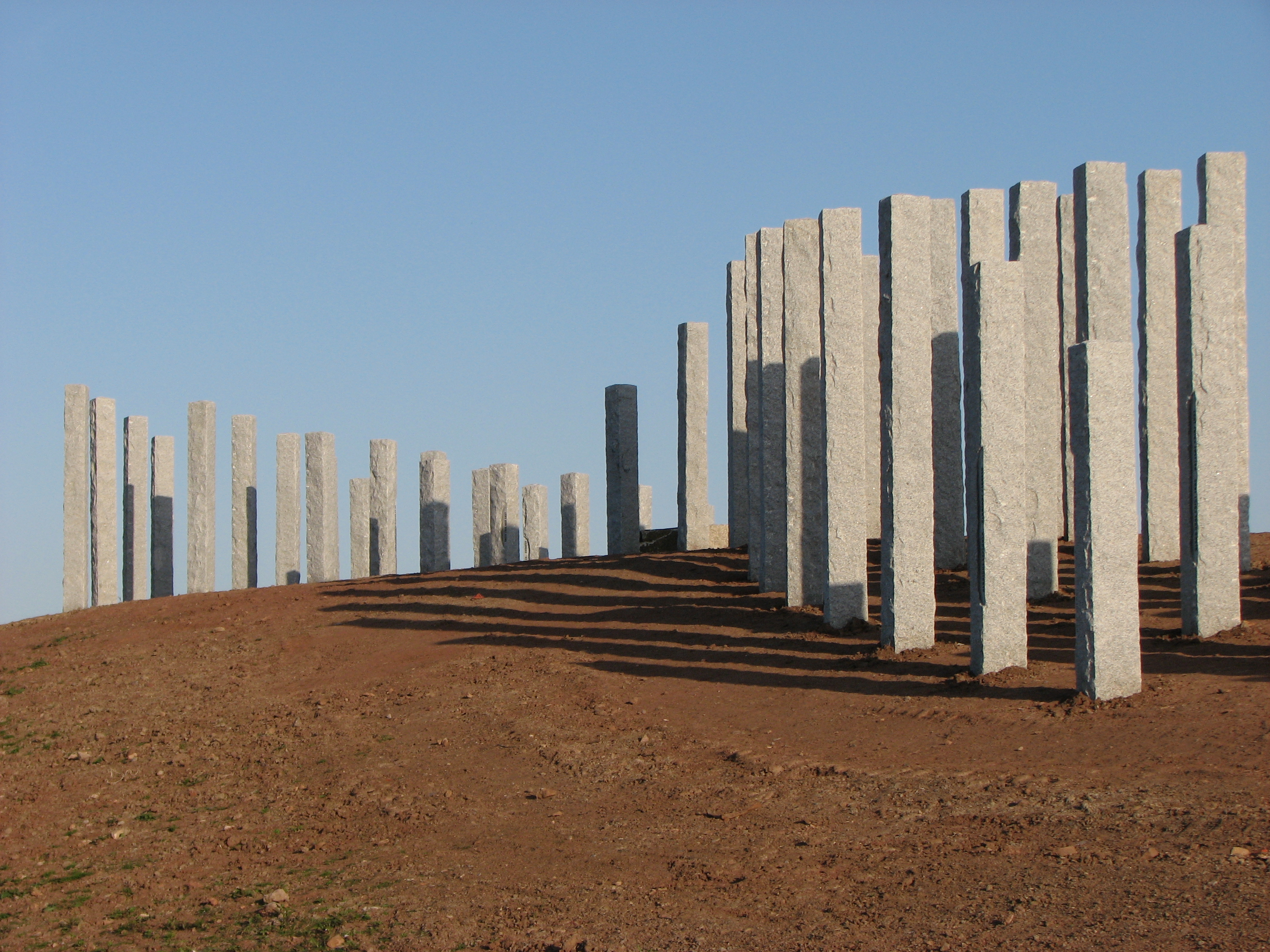
"Full Fathom Five", in Portishead, Somerset

The "Allenton Hippo" was unveiled in 2007 in Osmaston Road in Derby. It celebrates the Allenton hippopotamus, fossilised bones of a hippopotamus living around 125,000 years ago, discovered nearby in 1895, and now in Derby Museum and Art Gallery. Iron casts of the bones are on a black granite bench, the bench forming a broken ring.

"Full Fathom Five", of 2008, is in Pennant Place in Portishead, Somerset, on the edge of the Bristol Channel. It was commissioned and funded by Crest Nicholson and Persimmon Homes as part of the Port Marine development. There are 108 granite columns, of height up to 3 metres (9.8 ft), in an area 84 by 48 metres (276 by 157 ft) on a large earthwork. 37 of the columns bear vertically incised inscriptions about seafaring: there are names and descriptions of ships, quotes from folk songs, and parts of a poem. The columns together form the shape of a wave, and are arranged in curved aisles so that visitors can walk among them and read the inscriptions.

Sculptures outside the UK include "Deep in the Sheltering Forest" (2009) in Skulpturenweg Schweinstal and "Silent" in Skulpturenpark Durbach, both in Germany.
