= Nether Handley =

Hamlet in Derbyshire, England

Coordinates: 53.290°N 1.390°W

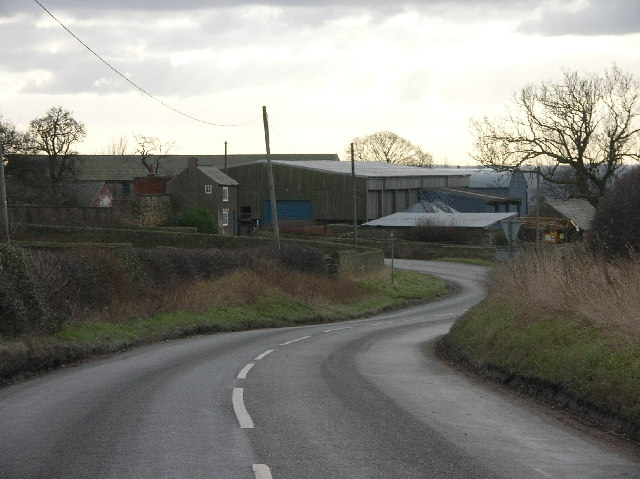

- Location within Derbyshire
- District: North East Derbyshire
- Shire county: Derbyshire
- Region: East Midlands
- Country: England
- Sovereign state: United Kingdom
- Post town: SHEFFIELD
- Postcode district: S21
- Police: Derbyshire
- Fire: Derbyshire
- Ambulance: East Midlands

Nether Handley is a hamlet in North East Derbyshire in the county of Derbyshire in England.

== Location ==
Nether Handley lies just south of the village of Marsh Lane, south-west of Eckington, and around 4 miles south of the village of Ridgeway, and north of New Whittington. In 1895 it was part of the parish of Staveley.

== History ==
Nether Handley has historically been a small, agricultural hamlet. The Hagge, a c. 1630 mansion, is Grade II* listed.
