= Boulton, Derby =

Suburb of Derby, England

Coordinates: 52.889435°N 1.431656°W

Boulton
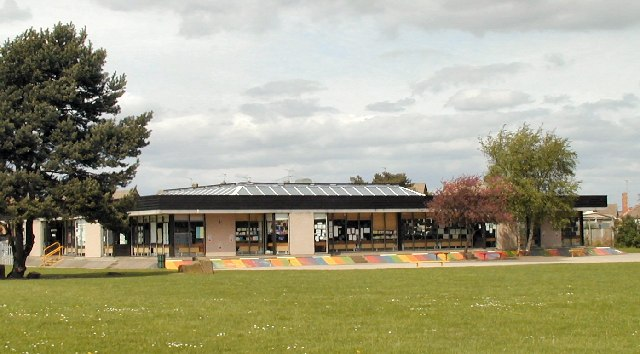
- Oakwood Infant School

- Location within Derbyshire
- Unitary authority: Derby
- Ceremonial county: Derbyshire
- Region: East Midlands
- Country: England
- Sovereign state: United Kingdom
- Post town: DERBY
- Postcode district: DE24
- Dialling code: 01332
- Police: Derbyshire
- Fire: Derbyshire
- Ambulance: East Midlands
- UK Parliament: Derby South

Boulton is a suburb and former local government ward of the city of Derby, in the ceremonial county of Derbyshire, England, and is located about four miles to the south-east of Derby city centre. It is closely associated with Alvaston and comes under the "Alvaston" postal dependent locality and code sector (DE24 0), and the Alvaston South ward. Alvaston South is represented on Derby City Council by three councillors.

The land at Boulton is recorded as belonging to Ralph fitzHubert in 1086. It has an Anglican church dedicated to St. Mary the Virgin, a Baptist church and a Grade II listed building called Nunsfield House.

== History ==
Hundreds of years ago, most of the area consisted of fields and farmland area.

In 1881 the civil parish had a population of 204. On 25 March 1884 the parish was abolished to form Alvaston and Boulton, part also went to Elvaston. It is now in the unparished area of Derby, in the Derby district.

Bus routes that serve the area include:

- Arriva Derby 1A - Derby > Alvaston circular anti-clockwise
- Arriva Derby 1C - Derby > Alvaston circular clockwise

== The Anglican Church ==
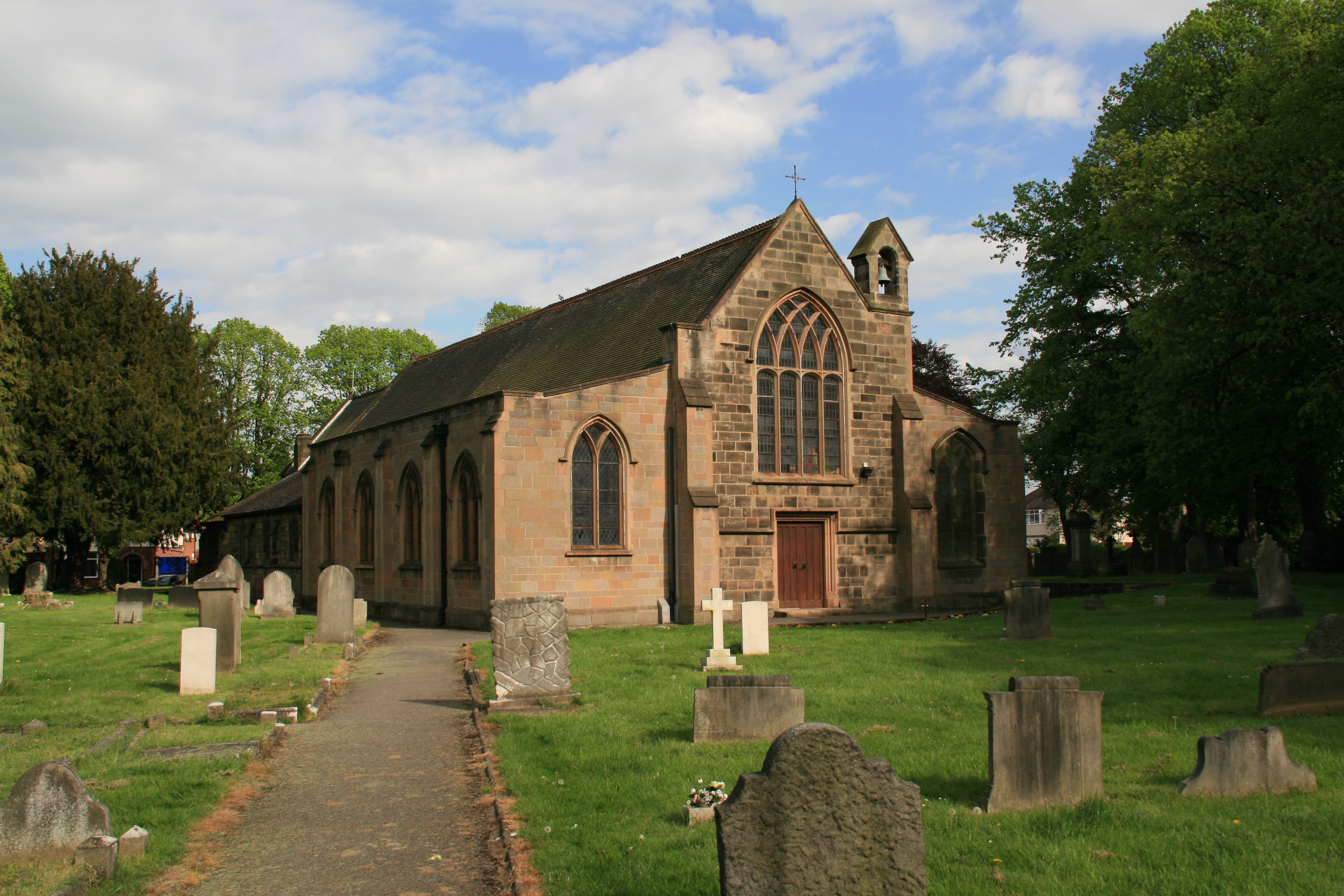
Boulton St. Mary's Church

The Anglican church, more usually called Boulton St. Mary's, was built about the year 1150 by the Sacheverell family who were owners of the Manor of Boulton at that time. Following a long period of dispute the church became a chapel of ease in 1281 to St. Peter's in Derby, this being brought about by the ambitions of the all-powerful abbot of Darley Abbey. The church is now within the Diocese of Derby. The lychgate which forms the main entrance to the churchyard on Boulton Lane is a war memorial to those of the parish who gave their lives in the Great War of 1914 to 1919. The church has been altered and extended during its long history but still retains some of the original Norman fabric.

== Nunsfield House ==
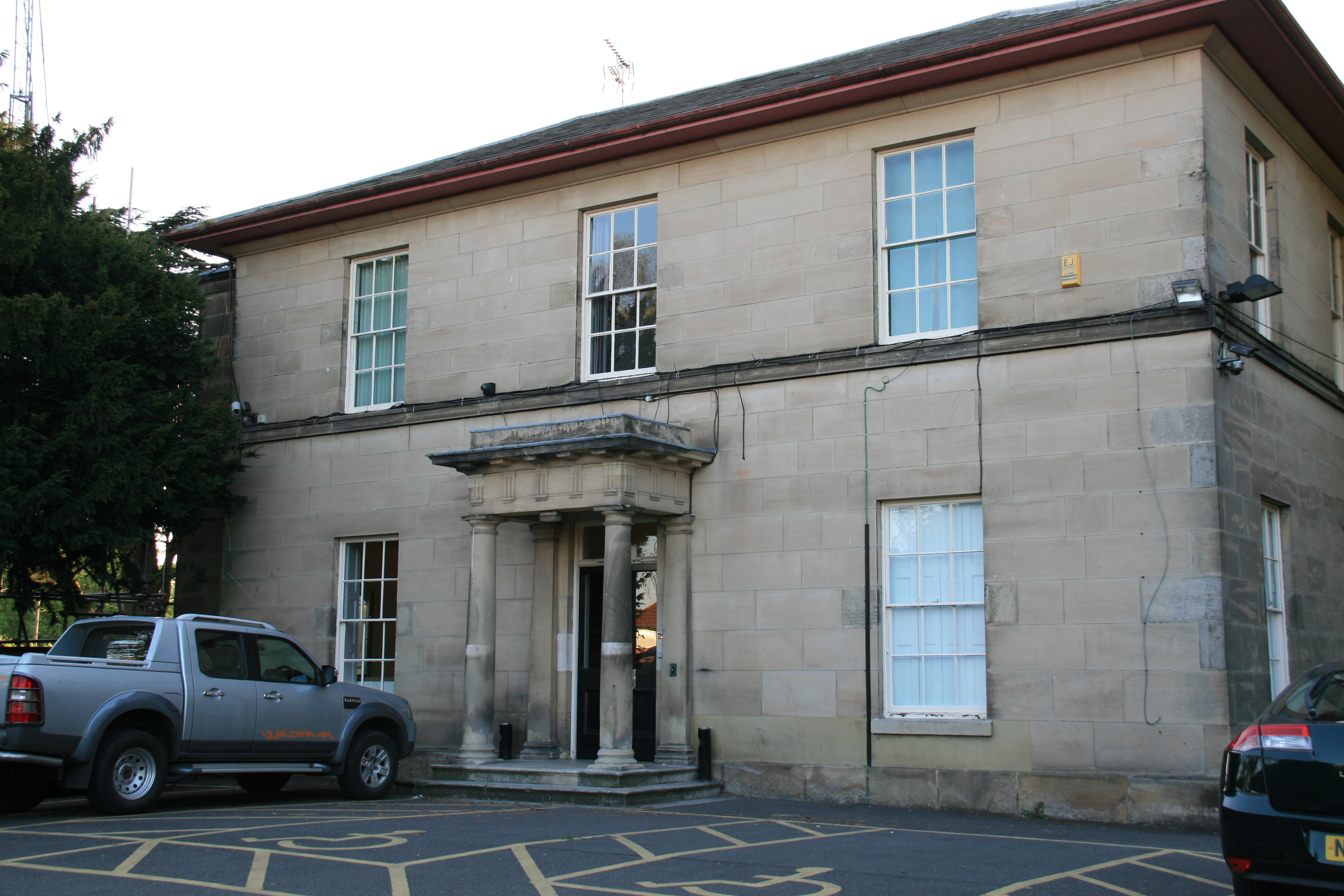
Nunsfield House

Nunsfield House, also on Boulton Lane, was built in 1828 by Mr Charles Holbrook and after subsequent owners and tenants it passed into the hands of Derbyshire County Council and later still (1996) to Derby City Council. The house is used for community purposes and in 1935 a community hall called the Jubilee Room was added. A small and cramped outbuilding was used as the local library for about 50 years and despite the difficult accommodation, the library was extremely popular. A modern library with computer terminals and Internet access is now available and located in the main Alvaston shopping centre.

== Boulton Moor ==
Boulton Moor is an area of scrubland and agricultural fields on the edge of Boulton situated between Allenton, Chellaston, Thulston and Aston on Trent. A new housing estate has been built on Boulton Moor, which is now a distinct postal Dependent Locality. Part of this area is outside the city boundary and is in the civil parish of Elvaston in South Derbyshire.

A Site of Special Scientific Interest known as Boulton Moor SSSI is situated in the agricultural land which borders the residential area of Boulton.

== See also ==
- Listed buildings in Boulton, Derby
