= Vicar Lane =

Vicar Lane may refer to:

- Vicar Lane, Leeds, a street in Leeds, West Yorkshire
- Vicar Lane Shopping Centre, a street and shopping centre in Chesterfield, Derbyshire
