= Low Pavement =

Low Pavement may refer to:

- Low Pavement, Chesterfield, a street in Chesterfield, Derbyshire
- Low Pavement, Nottingham, a street in Nottingham, Nottinghamshire
