= Somersall =

Somersall may refer to:

- Somersall Hall, historic house in Derbyshire, England
- Raheem Somersall (born 1997), Kittitian professional footballer
