= The Shambles, Chesterfield =

Street in Chesterfield, South Yorkshire, England

Coordinates: 53°14′08″N 1°25′40″W

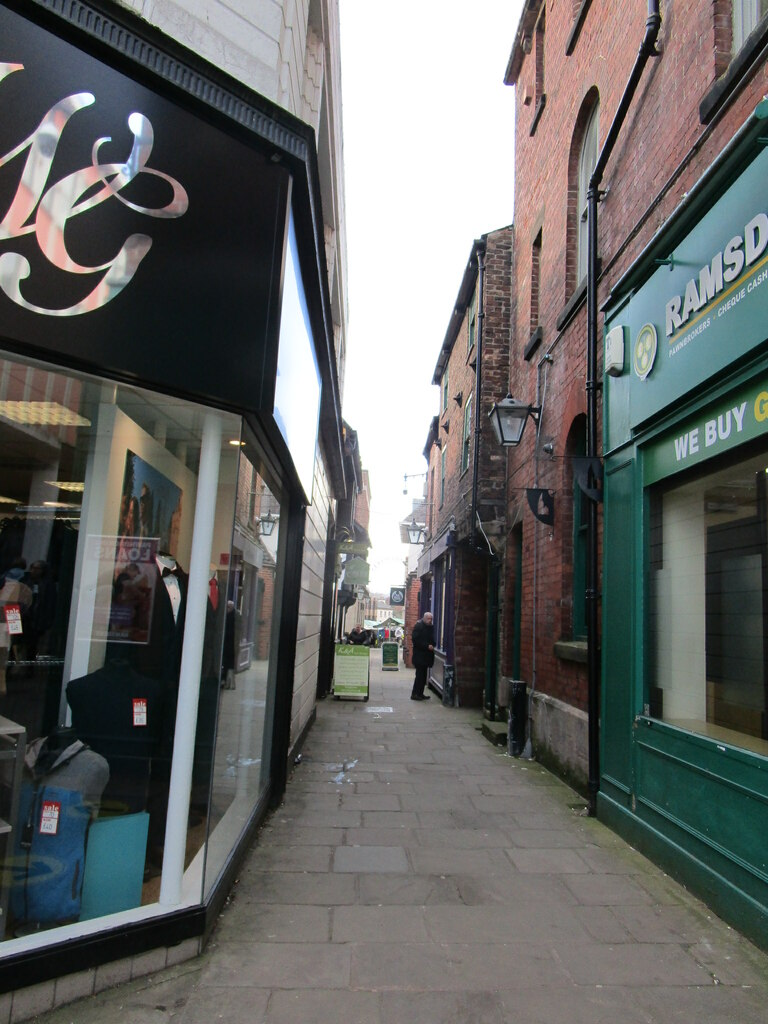
The Shambles (2023)

The Shambles is a street in Chesterfield, Derbyshire, England.

The name "Shambles" is an obsolete term, referring to slaughterhouses and associated butchers' shops. The Shambles in Chesterfield is adjacent to Chesterfield Market, which dates back to at least 1165. There are a number of notable buildings, including The Royal Oak, the town's oldest inn.

== Notable buildings ==
- Royal Oak, grade II* listed inn, dating back to the 16th-century.
- 12 and 13 The Shambles, grade II listed, dating back to the 18th-century.

== See also ==
- Listed buildings in Chesterfield, Derbyshire
