= Park Hall, Chesterfield =

Historic hall in Derbyshire, England

Coordinates: 53°13′17″N 1°28′08″W

Park Hall is a Grade II listed building located in the Walton area of Chesterfield, Derbyshire, England.

== History ==
The building dates to the 17th century, with evidence of earlier 16th-century features.

The hall was Grade II listed on 13 March 1968. The gardens are open to the public on certain dates. The current owner of the property is Adrian “Kim” M. C. Staniforth, former High Sheriff of South Yorkshire.

The adjoining barn and cottage were separately Grade II listed on 26 September 1977.

== See also ==
- Listed buildings in Chesterfield, Derbyshire
