= Listed buildings in Chesterfield, Derbyshire =

Chesterfield is a town and an unparished area in the Borough of Chesterfield, Derbyshire, England. The town and surrounding area contain 208 listed buildings that are recorded in the National Heritage List for England. Of these, one is listed at Grade I, the highest of the three grades, 14 are at Grade II*, the middle grade, and the others are at Grade II, the lowest grade. Most of the listed buildings are houses, cottages and associated structures, shops, banks and offices, public buildings, farmhouses and farm buildings. The other listed buildings include churches, chapels and items in churchyards, public houses, former mills, a lock on the Chesterfield Canal and a bridge crossing it, lamp posts and lamp standards, a town pump, a former workhouse, former schools, a market hall, cemetery buildings, a memorial hall later used as a museum, statues, four war memorials, a cinema and ballroom, and a bandstand and a conservatory in Queen's Park.

== Key ==
Grade	Criteria
I	Buildings of exceptional interest, sometimes considered to be internationally important
II*	Particularly important buildings of more than special interest
II	Buildings of national importance and special interest

== Buildings ==
Name and location	Photograph	Date	Notes	Grade
Church of St Mary and All Saints; 53.23623°N 1.42447°W		Medieval	The church is in stone, and has been extended and altered through the centuries. The north transept was rebuilt in 1769, and the church was restored in 1843 by George Gilbert Scott. It has a cruciform plan, consisting of a nave with a clerestory, a south porch, north and south aisles, north and south transepts, a chancel with four chapels, and a steeple at the crossing that is 228 feet (69 m) high. The steeple has a tower surmounted by a spire clad with lead plates, that is crooked due to warping of its timber. The church is the largest in the county, measuring 173 feet (53 m) by 110 feet (34 m).	I
191 Old Road; 53.23640°N 1.46490°W	—	Medieval (probable)	The building has a cruck frame, it is encased in stone with brick dressings, and has a stone slate roof. There is a single storey and five bays. Inside are full height crucks, resting on stylobates.	II
Brampton Barn; 53.23621°N 1.45631°W	—	Medieval	The barn, later used for other purposes, is in stone with a slate roof. There are three bays, it is supported on three crucks, and contains garage doors.	II
Dobbin Clough Farmhouse and barn 53.23841°N 1.40620°W		Medieval (possible)	The farmhouse, which is rendered on the west front, has a hipped stone slate roof, three storeys and two bays. The windows are casements irregularly placed, and stone steps lead up to the doorway in the middle floor. The barn to the south is in red brick with a pantile roof and about five bays. Inside the barn is a partition with exposed wattle.	II
Dunston Farm buildings 53.26652°N 1.45369°W	—	Medieval	The buildings have a timber framed core, later encased in stone, with quoins, and roofs of stone slate and corrugated asbestos with coped gables and kneelers. There are two storeys, the openings include a segmental arch with a keystone, windows, vents, and pitching eyes, and there is an external wooden staircase. Part of the building is cruck framed.	II
Buildings west of Dunston Hall; 53.26673°N 1.45394°W	—	Medieval	The buildings have a timber framed core, later encased in red brick, and a slate roof. The north end projects to the east to form a two-storey cottage. The range to the south contains stables and other buildings with lofts above, and the windows are casements. Inside, there are two pairs of massive crucks.	II
Eyre Chapel; 53.25156°N 1.44882°W		Medieval	The former chapel, which was converted for community use in 1987–89, is in stone with a stone slate roof. There are plain pinnacles on the four corners, and a crocketed pinnacle on the west gable. On the south front are two doorways, one with a Tudor arch, the other with a tympanum containing Norman carving in relief, and with traces of moulding on the jambs, and two Perpendicular windows.	II*
Former Falcon Inn; 53.23501°N 1.42735°W		Medieval	The building, at one time an inn, has a timber framed core, and is plastered on the exterior. There are three storeys and an attic, all jettied, and two gabled bays, the gables with bargeboards. The first floor is carried on three large Tuscan columns, behind which is a shop front with panelled pilasters, and a passage entry on the right. The upper floors contain canted oriel windows, between which is an original pilaster.	II
The Manor House, The Green; 53.21623°N 1.41125°W	—	16th Century	The house, which was later extended, and then refronted in the 19th century, is roughcast with a stone slate roof. There are two storeys, and on the front are three gables with applied timber framing. On the front are French windows and sash windows, and at the rear are mullioned windows and cross windows.	II
2 St Mary's Gate; 53.23649°N 1.42377°W		Late 15th century	A house later used for other purposes, it has a timber framed core, and was encased in stone in the early 17th century. It is in painted roughcast with a stone slab roof. There are two storeys, three bays, and a cross-wing. The windows are three-light sashes, those in the ground floor with cornices. The doorway to the right has a wide Tudor arch, a moulded architrave, a panel with plaster decoration and a broken pediment. At the rear is a wide segmental arch with pilasters, and an inserted door.	II*
The Peacock Inn; 53.23527°N 1.43025°W		c. 1500	The public house is timber framed on a stone plinth, with coved eaves and a slate roof. There are two storeys and cellars, the upper floor is jettied, and two bays. In the ground floor is a public house front with an entablature and panelled pilasters, and the upper floor contains two oriel windows.	II
The Royal Oak Inn; 53.23540°N 1.42772°W		16th century	The public house is timber framed with close studding, additions in brick, and a roof of tile and slate. The earlier part has two storeys, the upper storey jettied, and the later part has three storeys. On the north front are two oriel windows on curved brackets with embattled sills, containing mullioned windows, the lights with pointed heads. There is another oriel window on the west wall, and a blocked doorway with a Tudor arch. The east front is roughcast, and contains sash and casement windows.	II*
9 Beetwell Street; 53.23413°N 1.42685°W		Late 16th or early 17th century	A roughcast house with a tile roof, two storeys and a cellar, four bays, and a rear wing. In the left bay is a carriageway arch with timber framing visible within. To its right is a shop front with panelled pilasters and reeded consoles, and a doorway with an architrave and a fanlight, and the windows are sashes.	II*
Manor House, Whittington Hill; 53.26564°N 1.42798°W	—	16th or 17th century	The house, which was later extended, is in stone and has two storeys and an attic, and two later cross-wings. On the front is a large mullioned window, with five lights over six, and a gabled dormer.	II
The Close; 53.27237°N 1.42381°W	—	16th or 17th century	The house, which was later altered and extended, is in stone with a slate roof. There are two storeys and four bays. On the front is a two-storey porch and a doorway with a hood mould. In the ground floor are modern bay windows, and elsewhere are sash windows and a three-light mullioned window. The house has an arched cellar with brick vaults.	II
Barn, Loundsley Green Farm; 53.24035°N 1.46582°W	—	Early 17th century (or earlier)	The barn is timber framed, later encased in stone, and with a stone slate roof. There are three bays, and a half bay later added to the south. Inside, there is a variety of truss types.	II
Gazebo, Somersall Hall; 53.22563°N 1.47339°W	—	Early 17th century	The gazebo in the grounds of the house is in stone, and is rebuilt in brick at the rear. It has a coped gable on each side, a parapet with a ball finial at each corner, and one on the apex of the roof. There is a square plan, and two storeys. On each front, in the upper floor, is a three-light mullioned window with a continuous hood mould.	II*
Birdholme House; 53.21574°N 1.42684°W	—	17th century	The house, which was later extended and divided, is in stone with a string course, and it has a hipped roof in stone slate at the front and pantile on the side. There are three storeys, and four bays. On the front is a two-storey 17th-century porch with a coped gable. Some mullioned windows remain, and the others are a mix of sashes and casements.	II
Dunston Grange Farmhouse; 53.26373°N 1.45356°W	—	17th century	The farmhouse, which was refronted in the 19th century, is in stone with quoins and a slate roof with a coped gable and kneelers. There are two storeys and three bays. On the front is a double door with a fanlight, and sash windows. At the rear are cellars, two doorways, one with a fanlight, and casement windows.	II
Dunston Hall; 53.26678°N 1.45354°W	—	17th century	The house, which has been extended, is in stone, and has a slate roof with coped gables. The northern part has three storeys and two bays, and the southern part has two storeys and three bays. The roofs are of similar height, and there are four gables. The windows have Tudor arches and hood moulds, and there is a canted bay window. The porch has a four-centred arch, piers, and an embattled parapet.	II
Fields Farmhouse; 53.25554°N 1.46913°W	—	17th century	The farmhouse is in stone with quoins and a stone slate roof. There are two storeys and attics, and three bays. On the front, two bays are gabled, and there is a brick porch. At the rear is an external staircase, the windows are casements or replacements, and in the gable end is a loft door and a pitching eye.	II
Former Holywell Cross Post Office; 53.23798°N 1.42590°W		17th century or earlier	The former post office, which probably has a timber framed core, is plastered on the exterior, and has a brick eaves cornice and a slate roof. There are two storeys, three bays, and a lower two-storey cross-wing at the rear. In the angle on the corner is a doorway, and on the front is a shop window that has an entablature with a cornice, an architrave, and pilasters with a motif. To its right is another doorway, and the upper floor contains casement windows. On the cross-wing is a similar shop window, and a doorway with pilasters and a cornice.	II
Manor House, Brampton; 53.23602°N 1.45635°W		17th century (probable)	A house that has been altered, refronted in the 19th century, and later converted for other uses. It is mainly rendered, with pebbledashing at the rear, and a stone slate roof. There are two storeys and attics, and the building consists of three gabled ranges, and a recessed wing at right angles. On the front is a porch in the form of a conservatory. Most of the windows are sashes, and there are mullioned windows in the wing and at the rear.	II
Park Hall; 53.22150°N 1.46893°W	—	17th century	The house, which contains earlier features, is in stone, with quoins, and a stone slate roof with a coped gable. The main range has two storeys, to the east is a projecting three-storey wing, and there is an outshut containing the entrance, over which is a reset dated plaque. The windows are mullioned, some with hood moulds, and there is a dormer.	II
Revolution House; 53.27026°N 1.42587°W		17th century (probable)	The remaining part of the Old Cock and Pynot Inn is in stone, and has a thatched roof with coped gables and kneelers. There is a single storey and an attic, and it contains two mullioned windows and a dormer. On the gable end is a plaque with an inscription stating that a meeting took place in the inn in 1688 that led to the Glorious Revolution.	II*
Somersall Hall; 53.22580°N 1.47277°W	—	17th century	The main part of the house is dated 1763, with the remainder of the old hall forming the rear wing, and the house was extended in the 19th century. It is in stone and has a stone slate roof with coped gables. The main range has three storeys and three bays, to the north is a two-storey extension, and the rear wing has one storey and an attic. In the centre is a porch with clustered columns, an ornamental entablature, an embattled parapet and a doorway with an ornamental fanlight. Most of the windows are sashes, there is a canted bay window, and in the rear wing are two three-light mullioned windows.	II
Stables, Somersall Farm; 53.22615°N 1.47226°W	—	17th century	The stable building is in stone with a stone slate roof and two storeys. In the centre is a doorway with a rusticated surround, a cambered head, and a hood mould. The windows are mullioned with hood moulds, at one gable end is an external staircase, and in the other gable end are pigeon holes.	II
Stud Farm Cottages; 53.22362°N 1.43383°W	—	17th century	A pair of cottages in stone with quoins, and roofs with Welsh slate at the front and stone slate elsewhere. There are two storeys and an L-shaped plan. On the front are mullioned windows, and two former carriage entrances infilled with windows, and between them is a round-arched door.	II
Tapton Manor; 53.24565°N 1.39939°W	—	17th century	A stone house with a stone slate roof, two storeys and attics, an L-shaped plan, and a garden front of two bays. In the centre is a modern glazed porch, and the windows are mullioned.	II
The Old Mansion House; 53.27039°N 1.42660°W	—	17th century or earlier	The house, which has been altered and extended, has been divided into three dwellings. It is in stone on a coped plinth and has a slate roof. There are two storeys, and the east front has three bays and a small central gable. The central doorway has an architrave, and the windows are sashes with stuccoed voussoirs.	II
Farm buildings north of The Manor House; 53.21650°N 1.41106°W	—	17th century (probable)	The farm buildings are in stone with a stone slate roof. The southern range has four bays and coped gables. To the north are cowsheds with a small central gable.	II
The Old House; 53.25166°N 1.45299°W		1678	The house, later extended and used for other purposes, is in stone and has a tile roof with coped gables. There are two storeys and an L-shaped plan, with a range of four bays, and a single storey wing. The windows are mullioned.	II
Unitarian Chapel; 53.23690°N 1.42728°W		1693	The chapel is in stone, partly roughcast, with quoins, and a hipped stone slab roof. There are two storeys, and the east front has two bays. The south front has six bays, the second to fourth bays projecting under a pediment, with an oculus, a frieze and a cornice. The central doorway has a segmental head and a pediment, over which are two panels. The windows are mullioned and transomed in architraves.	II*
Crewe Cottage; 53.24556°N 1.39969°W	—	17th to early 18th century	The cottage is in stone with a stone slate roof. There are two storeys and four bays, and the windows are mullioned with two lights.	II
Barn and cottage, Park Hall Farm; 53.22159°N 1.46927°W	—	17th to early 18th century	The south end of the barn was later converted into a cottage. It is in stone with quoins and a stone slate roof with coped gables. The barn contains doorways with massive quoined surrounds, and there is a former wagon entrance.	II
Former threshing barn, Plover Hill Farm; 53.23949°N 1.39469°W	—	17th to early 18th century	The former barn has a corrugated iron roof, and coped gables with kneelers. There are five bays, and the barn contains massive timber trusses.	II
Two barns, Somersall Farm; 53.22629°N 1.47255°W	—	17th to early 18th century	The barns are in stone with stone slate roofs, the east barn with quoins, and the west barn with a gable end in brick. The barns contain doors, windows with hood moulds, and vents, some vertical and some triangular. There is a single-story extension with a hipped roof, and a timber framed wagon entrance infilled with brick.	II
Barn, Dunston Farm; 53.26363°N 1.44442°W	—	1716	The barn is in stone with quoins, and a stone slate roof with coped gables and kneelers. It contains double doors and stable doors, a pitching eye, and vents. Above the doorway is a datestone with a monogram.	II
Gazebo, Manor House; 53.23591°N 1.45729°W	—	Early 18th century	The gazebo is in stone with quoins, a coved eaves cornice, and an ogee roof in stone fish scale-shaped slabs with a ball finial on a pedestal. There is a tall single storey on a basement, and the entrance is approached by external steps lined by walls containing an alcove seat with a curved back and coved cornice. The windows are sashes.	II*
Spital Barn; 53.22947°N 1.41557°W		Early 18th century	Originally a coach house and stable block, it was converted for residential use in the 20th century, and is in stone with quoins and a stone slate roof. On the front are two segmental-arched openings, stable doors, a loft door, and mullioned windows.	II
48 and 50 Church Street North; 53.27256°N 1.42635°W	—	18th century	A pair of houses in stone that have a slate roof with coping and kneelers at the rear. There are two storeys and two bays. The doorways are in the centre, and the windows are sashes.	II
5 and 7 Low Pavement; 53.23503°N 1.42774°W		18th century	A pair of shops in red brick with a moulded cornice, a parapet, and a slate roof with coped gables. At the rear is a plinth and quoins. There are three storeys and three bays, the middle bay projecting slightly. In the top floor are lunette windows, and the middle floor contains Venetian windows. In the ground floor are two shop fronts, with an entablature, a moulded cornice, a frieze, and an architrave. The interior of the right shop contains glazed tiles, and the left shop front is curved on the right.	II
41 Low Pavement; 53.23512°N 1.42878°W		18th century	The building forms a vaulted entrance to shops behind. It is in painted brick and has rusticated quoins, bands, and a parapet. In the ground floor are three round arches on columns with keystones. There are three storeys and an attic, and three bays. In the upper floors are sash windows with wedge lintels.	II
43 Low Pavement; 53.23512°N 1.42892°W		18th century	A stone shop with a moulded cornice and blocking course. There are three storeys, three bays flanked by rusticated pilasters, and a further bay on the left. In the ground floor is a 19th-century shop front flanked by rusticated pilasters, over which is a dentilled cornice and end pedimented consoles. The upper floors contain sash windows in architraves with keystones.	II
45 Low Pavement; 53.23513°N 1.42906°W		18th century	A brick shop with a sill band, a modillion eaves cornice, a blocking course with moulded coping, ramped at the centre and the ends, and a roof with coped gables. There are three storeys, three bays and a rear wing. In the ground floor is a modern shop front, and to its left is a former carriage arch with a rusticated surround, now infilled. The windows are sashes, the central windows with moulded architraves and keystones, and that in the middle floor also with a pulvinated frieze.	II
77 Low Pavement; 53.23529°N 1.43070°W	—	18th century	A shop on a corner site in painted brick with bands, a moulded eaves band, and a stone slate roof. There are three storeys, one bay on the front, and a rear wing. The ground floor contains shop fronts, in the middle floor is a display window with a cornice, and in the top floor is a sash window with an engraved lintel and a keystone.	II
1 Sheffield Road; 53.23910°N 1.42687°W		18th century	The building is in red brick on a plinth, with quoins, bands, bracketed eaves, and a slate roof. There are two storeys and five bays. The central doorway has a stuccoed moulded architrave and a cornice. The windows are sashes with stuccoed keystones.	II
5 and 7 South Street; 53.23472°N 1.42723°W		18th century	The building, which contains earlier features, is in red brick and has a slate roof with coped gables. There are three storeys and three bays. In the ground floor is a 19th-century shop front with a cornice, an architrave, and consoles with floral decoration. The window in the centre of the middle floor is blind, and has a segmental arch and a keystone. The windows in the outer bays are sashes, those in the middle floor with wedge lintels.	II
42 St Mary's Gate; 53.23485°N 1.42425°W		Mid 18th century	A red brick house in Georgian style, with quoins, stone floor bands, a moulded eaves cornice, and a stone slab roof. There are three storeys and five bays. The central doorway has a moulded architrave, a rectangular fanlight, a frieze and a cornice. The windows are sashes with keystones.	II*
Brampton House; 53.23873°N 1.45115°W	—	Mid 18th century (possible)	A red brick house, which was later altered, with a slate roof. The main front facing Welwyn Grove has two storeys, two gables with an eaves band, and two dated plaques. The doorway has engaged columns and an open pediment, and sash windows. The front facing Old Hall Road has three storeys and two bays, and a pierced and scalloped bargeboard.	II
Elm Lodge; 53.23272°N 1.46675°W	—	18th century	The house, with possibly an earlier core, was extended in the 19th century. It has a rendered front, a stone slate roof, and five bays. On the front is a porch, and the windows are sashes. To the right is a later cross-wing with a slate roof.	II
Long Cottage; 53.27054°N 1.42513°W	—	18th century	A stone house that has a pantile roof with coped gables and kneelers. There are two storeys and four bays, and the windows are sliding casements.	II
Former Post Office; 53.23580°N 1.42984°W		18th century	A house, used as the post office from 1886, and later converted for other uses. It is in red brick, the ground floor in rusticated stone, with pilasters, an eaves cornice, and a coped parapet. There are three storeys and a symmetrical front of five bays, the middle three bays projecting under a pediment with an oeil-de-boeuf in the tympanum. The doorways in the outer bays have rectangular fanlights and keystones, and hoods on consoles, and above them is a cornice on decorated consoles. The upper floors contain sash windows with keystones.	II
Gate piers, Somersall Hall; 53.22595°N 1.47269°W	—	18th century	The gate piers near the front of the house are in rusticated stone. They are square, and have moulded caps and ball finials.	II
The Court House and adjoining buildings 53.24227°N 1.41797°W		18th century	The house is in red brick, and has a slate roof with stone slate verges. There are two storeys and three bays. The windows are a mix of sashes and sliding casements. Adjoining at the north end, and forming an L-shaped plan, is a range of red brick buildings.	II
Cannon Mill and mill wheel 53.23337°N 1.43972°W		1775	The former mill is in red brick, and has a pantile roof with slate verges and a coped gable with ornamental cresting. There are two storeys and three bays. In each bay on the east front is a blank Gothic arch. On the mill is an oval cast iron plaque depicting a cannon with cannonballs, and dated 1816. The mill contains a large overshot iron water wheel.	II
54 and 56 Church Street North; 53.27268°N 1.42632°W		Late 18th century	A pair of stone houses with a stone slate roof, two storeys and two bays. The doorways are in the centre, and the windows are sliding casements.	II
87 New Square; 53.23581°N 1.43087°W		Late 18th century	A red brick house with sill bands, a modillion eaves cornice and a coped blocking course. There are three storeys and four bays. Steps lead up to the doorway in the third bay that has pilasters, a semicircular fanlight, a triglyph frieze, and a pediment. The flanking bays are full height canted bay windows. All the windows are sashes, those in the lower two storeys with wedge lintels. The windows above the doorway have an architrave and a triple keystone, and the window in the middle floor also has a pediment.	II
1 Somersall Lane; 53.23094°N 1.47087°W		Late 18th century	A former lodge to Somersall Hall, it is stuccoed with wide eaves and a hipped stone slate roof. There is a single storey, and the corners are canted. The doorways have four-centred arches, and the windows are casements with pointed heads and architraves.	II
2 Somersall Lane; 53.23088°N 1.47061°W		Late 18th century	A former lodge to Somersall Hall, it is stuccoed with wide eaves and a hipped stone slate roof. There is a single storey, and the corners are canted. The doorways have four-centred arches, and the windows are casements with pointed heads and architraves.	II
Somersall Farmhouse; 53.22600°N 1.47317°W	—	Late 18th century	Originally the coach house to Somersall Hall, it is in stone with quoins. There are two storeys and five bays. Over the middle bay is a pediment containing a round panel in the tympanum over arched pigeon holes. In the centre is a segmental arch that is infilled, containing a three-light sash window, and a single-light sash above with a hood mould. The other windows are Gothic casements with Gothic glazing.	II
Walton Hall; 53.22212°N 1.45368°W	—	Late 18th century	A house in gritstone, with a sill bands, a moulded eaves cornice, and a stone slate roof with coped gables and moulded kneelers. There is an L-shaped plan, with a main range of two storeys and attics and three bays, and a two-storey rear wing. The doorway has a moulded head, a rectangular fanlight, and a cornice hood. In the ground floor the windows are sashes, there are cross windows in the middle floor, and casements in the attic.	II
Mill buildings, Walton Works; 53.23243°N 1.45057°W		Late 18th century	A former cotton mill and associated buildings, built in stone and red brick with roofs of slate, stone slate, and pantile. They are mainly in three storeys, with parts in two and four storeys, and there is an irregular plan, including a water tower.	II*
Tapton Mill Bridge; 53.24704°N 1.41958°W		c. 1777	The bridge carries a path over the Chesterfield Canal. It is in red brick with a stone coped parapet, and has a curved plan. It consists of a single low arch, and is flanked by brick pilasters.	II
Tapton Lock; 53.25190°N 1.42128°W		c. 1777	The lock on the Chesterfield Canal is in stone with a brick band and stone coping. At the entrance is stone coped brickwork.	II
11 Beetwell Street; 53.23412°N 1.42669°W		1780	A shop in red brick with a slate roof, three storeys, two bays, and a long rear wing. In the right bay is a carriageway arch, and the left bay contains a shop front with a cornice on consoles with a floral design. In the upper floors are sash windows, those in the middle floor with stuccoed lintels.	II
Tapton House; 53.24501°N 1.41383°W		1782–94	A country house in red brick with bands, a modillion cornice, and a hipped slate roof. There are three storeys, and the entrance front has eight bays. The fifth bay projects under a pediment, and contains a doorway with columns, side lights, and a pediment, above which are three-light windows. The other bays contain sash windows. The right return has five bays, and at the rear are eight bays and a doorway with a pediment.	II*
Hasland Hall School; 53.21794°N 1.40661°W	—	c. 1800	A house, later part of a school, it is in stone with a band, a cornice and blocking course, and a hipped slate roof. There are two storeys and five bays. In the centre is a semicircular porch with Doric columns, a panelled frieze, a cornice with mutules, and a blocking course, containing a round-arched doorway with a fanlight and side lights. The windows are sashes, the window above the porch with an ornamental surround and a cornice on brackets.	II
Holywell House; 53.23895°N 1.42665°W		c. 1800	The house, which has since been used for other purposes, is in stone, the front facing the street is in brick, and it has an eaves band, a hipped slate roof, and two storeys, The southeast front has three bays, and a central semicircular porch with four Tuscan columns, and a panelled frieze. The doorway has a round-arched head, flanking windows, and a segmental hood, and the window above it has an architrave and a cornice on brackets. The left bay contains sash windows, and in the right bay are blind windows. The middle two bays of the northeastern front project under a pediment.	II
Boiler House behind 9 Beetwell Street; 53.23400°N 1.42679°W	—	Late 18th to early 19th century	A small brick building with a corrugated iron roof and a single storey. It contains a bow window with a dentilled cornice and corbels.	II
13 and 15 Beetwell Street; 53.23412°N 1.42659°W		Late 18th to early 19th century	A shop in red brick with a slate roof, three storeys and two bays. In the ground floor is a 19th-century shop front with a cornice on decorated consoles, and a fascia board. In the upper floors are sash windows, those in the middle floor with stuccoed lintels.	II
Buildings to rear of 13 Beetwell Street; 53.23398°N 1.42661°W	—	Late 18th to early 19th century	Originally a blacksmith's shop, the range of buildings is in red brick and has one storey.	II
4 Central Pavement; 53.23523°N 1.42787°W	—	Late 18th to early 19th century	A shop in red brick with a moulded wooden eaves cornice and a slate roof. There are three storeys and three bays. In the ground floor is a shop front dating from the late 19th or early 20th century with a cornice and end consoles, and a modern fascia board. The upper floors contain sash windows, those in the middle floor with stuccoed lintels.	II
402–406 Chatsworth Road; 53.23192°N 1.45476°W	—	Late 18th to early 19th century	A terrace of three houses on a plinth, in red brick on the front and stone at the rear, and with a stone slate roof. There are two storeys, and each house has one bay. The doorways have architraves, and the windows are sashes. The ground floor windows and the doorways have painted wedge lintels.	II
8–14 Church Street North; 53.27098°N 1.42638°W	—	Late 18th to early 19th century	A terrace of four stone houses with a stone slate roof. There are two storeys and eight bays. Most of the windows are sashes, and most of the doors are replacements.	II
16 and 18 Church Street North; 53.27098°N 1.42658°W	—	Late 18th to early 19th century	A pair of houses at right angles to the road, in stone with a stone slate roof. There are three storeys, three bays, and a single-storey outshut on the left. The round-arched doorways have impost bands, fanlights, archivolts, and keystones, and the windows are sashes with architraves.	II
Garden wall, 1 Durrant Road; 53.23806°N 1.42579°W	—	18th to 19th century	The garden wall to the northeast of the house is about 6 feet (1.8 m) high, and is plastered.	II
10 High Street; 53.23590°N 1.42789°W	—	Late 18th to early 19th century	A shop in red brick, with a moulded eaves cornice, three storeys and three bays. In the ground floor is a late 19th-century shop front with Corinthian pilasters, and an elaborate entablature with a modillion cornice and a frieze. To its left is a round-arched doorway with a semicircular fanlight, and to its right is a segmental-arched carriageway. The upper floors contain sash windows with stuccoed wedge lintels.	II
87 High Street; 53.27058°N 1.42411°W	—	Late 18th to early 19th century	A house in red brick with three storeys and three bays. The central doorway is round-headed with a semicircular fanlight, impost bands, and a stuccoed archivolt. The windows are sashes with stuccoed wedge lintels.	II
39 and 41 Holywell Street; 53.23791°N 1.42577°W		Late 18th to early 19th century	A pair of red brick houses with a moulded eaves cornice and a hipped slate roof. There are three storeys and two bays. The round-arched doorways have stuccoed reveals, semicircular fanlights, and moulded impost bands. The windows are sashes with stuccoed wedge lintels.	II
1 and 1A Low Pavement; 53.23504°N 1.42800°W		Late 18th to early 19th century	A pair of shops in painted brick with a moulded eaves cornice and a slate roof. There are three storeys and two bays. In the ground floor are shop fronts with a cornice and consoles, and the upper floors contain sash windows with stuccoed lintels.	II
3 Low Pavement; 53.23504°N 1.42789°W		Late 18th to early 19th century	A shop in painted brick with a moulded eaves cornice and a slate roof. There are three storeys and two bays. In the ground floor is a modern shop front and a segmental arched carriageway entrance on the right. The upper floors contain sash windows with stuccoed lintels.	II
9 Low Pavement; 53.23503°N 1.42759°W		Late 18th to early 19th century	A shop in red brick with a slate roof and two bays. The right bay has four storeys, and contains a segmental carriageway, and in the upper floors are sash windows. The left bay is the same height, with three storeys. In the ground floor is a 19th-century shop front with panelled pilasters and fluted consoles. The upper floors contain sash windows, the window in the middle floor with an engraved lintel and a keystone.	II
35 Low Pavement; 53.23508°N 1.42841°W		Late 18th to early 19th century	A shop on a corner site in painted brick with a moulded parapet. There are three storeys, two bays on the front and one on the left return. In the ground floor is a modern shop front, and the upper floors contain sash windows.	II
39 Low Pavement; 53.23510°N 1.42865°W	—	Late 18th to early 19th century	A pair of shops in painted brick with a moulded parapet. There are three storeys and three bays. In the ground floor are two shop fronts with pilasters and pedimented consoles. The upper floors contain sash windows with shallow segmental heads.	II
61, 61A, 61B 63 and 63C Low Pavement; 53.23524°N 1.42995°W		Late 18th to early 19th century	Two shops in painted brick, with an eaves cornice and a tile roof. There are three storeys, five bays, and a two-storey rear wing. In the second bay is a segmental-arched carriageway entrance, now infilled with a doorway. To its left is a modern shop front, to the right is a larger shop front, and the upper floors contain sash windows.	II
69 and 71 Low Pavement; 53.23528°N 1.43041°W	—	Late 18th to early 19th century	A red brick shop with a moulded wooden eaves cornice and a hipped slate roof. There are three storeys and three bays. In the ground floor is a shop front dating from the later 19th or early 20th century, and the upper floors contain sash windows with engraved stuccoed lintels.	II
73 and 75 Low Pavement; 53.23529°N 1.43059°W		Late 18th to early 19th century	A shop in painted brick with a moulded wooden eaves cornice and a tile roof. There are three storeys and three bays. In the ground floor, the right bay contains a segmental carriage archway, now infilled with a doorway, and to its left are shop fronts dating from the later 19th or early 20th century. The upper floors contain sash windows with stuccoed lintels.	II
21 Market Place; 53.23572°N 1.42820°W	—	Late 18th to early 19th century	Two houses, later shops, on a corner site, in painted brick with a moulded eaves cornice, and a hipped slate roof. There are three storeys, three bays on High Street and four on Market Place. In the ground floor are modern shop fronts, and the upper floors contain mainly sash windows, with some casements.	II
21 and 23 Newbold Road; 53.23953°N 1.42801°W	—	Late 18th to early 19th century	A pair of houses, later combined, in red brick with a stone slate roof. There are three storeys and four bays. In the centre is a double trellised porch with arched entrances, and doorways with moulded architraves. The windows in the middle bays in the upper floors are blind, in the top floor are casement windows, elsewhere the windows are sashes with moulded surrounds, and all the windows have stuccoed wedge lintels.	II
39 Newbold Road; 53.25202°N 1.44842°W	—	Late 18th to early 19th century	A pair of cottages, later combined, in stone with a slate roof. There are two storeys and two bays. The doorway has a moulded architrave, and the windows are sliding casements.	II
57 and 59 Saltergate; 53.23754°N 1.42869°W		Late 18th to early 19th century	A pair of red brick houses on a rendered plinth, with a moulded eaves cornice. There are three storeys and five bays. The two doorways have rectangular fanlights with radial glazing, and the windows are sashes. The doorways and the windows in the lower two floors have stuccoed wedge lintels.	II
63 Saltergate; 53.23755°N 1.42904°W		Late 18th to early 19th century	A house in red brick, with an eaves cornice, three storeys, and one bay. On the front is a doorway, and sash windows with moulded surrounds and engraved wedge lintels, and at the rear is a casement window.	II
12 and 13 The Shambles; 53.23555°N 1.42762°W		Late 18th to early 19th century	A shop on a corner site, possibly with a timber framed core. It is in red brick, and has three storeys and fronts of two bays. In the ground floor is a shop front with panelled pilasters, double cornices, a frieze, and a cornice, and the windows are sashes.	II
19 and 21 West Bars; 53.23543°N 1.43212°W		Late 18th to early 19th century	A group of rendered shops with a moulded cornice, a coped parapet, and a pantile roof with coped gables. There are three storeys and three bays. In the ground floor are shop fronts, and the upper floors contain sash windows.	II
Boundary wall 53.27196°N 1.42493°W	—	18th to 19th century	The wall is in stone, coped, and 8 feet (2.4 m) high. It is on the eastern side of a footpath extending from No. 65 High Street to the churchyard of St Bartholomew's Church.	II
Dryhurst; 53.23496°N 1.39871°W	—	18th to early 19th century	The house is colourwashed, and has quoins, a sill band, and a hipped slate roof. There are two storeys and three bays. The central doorway has a pediment, and the windows are sashes.	II
Highfield Hall School; 53.24936°N 1.43899°W	—	18th to 19th century	The school is in stone with an eaves cornice and slate roofs, the sides pedimented. There are two storeys and five bays. On the front is a canted bay window, and the windows are casements. The porch has four columns, a round-arched doorway with a fanlight, and a segmental hood.	II
Holme Hall Farmhouse; 53.24758°N 1.47135°W	—	18th to early 19th century	The farmhouse, later used for other purposes, is in stone with sill bands and a stone slab roof. There are two storeys and four bays. On the front is a gabled porch, and the windows are sashes with cambered heads, quoined surrounds, and lintels cut to shallow arches.	II
Cowsheds north of Holme Hall Farmhouse; 53.24798°N 1.47140°W	—	18th to early 19th century	The cowsheds have roofs of slate and stone slate. The central bay has two storeys, and contains a segmental arch with a keystone, and the flanking bays have a single storey.	II
Plover Hill Farmhouse; 53.23931°N 1.39481°W	—	18th to early 19th century	The farmhouse, which has an earlier core, is in red brick with a stone slate roof. There are two storeys, three bays, and a later rear wing. Some windows are 19th-century casements, and the others are modern.	II
Raised pavement, Church Street North; 53.27277°N 1.42662°W	—	18th or 19th century	The raised pavement runs along the north side of the junction between Church Street North and the approach to the church. It consists of a stone embankment wall with coping, a central flight of stone steps, and later railings.	II
Gate piers, Tapton House; 53.24463°N 1.41480°W	—	Late 18th to early 19th century	The gate piers at the entrance to the drive are in stone, and each has a fluted frieze and a pediment.	II
Mounting block, Tapton House; 53.24456°N 1.41496°W	—	Late 18th to early 19th century	The mounting block near the entrance to the drive is in stone, and consists of five steps.	II
The Market Hotel; 53.23580°N 1.43026°W		Late 18th to early 19th century	The public house is in red brick, mostly rendered, on a plinth, with a moulded eaves cornice and a slate roof. There are three storeys and three bays. In the left bay is a shop front, and the other bays have bow windows, between which is a doorway. In the upper floors, most windows are sashes with engraved lintels.	II
The Spread Eagle Public House; 53.23413°N 1.42697°W		Late 18th to early 19th century	The public house, which probably has an earlier core, has a front in painted brick with a sill band, and a roof in slate at the front, in pantile at the rear, and with coped gables. The front has three storeys and two bays. In the right bay is an arched carriageway, and the windows are sashes, in the ground floor with three lights. The doorway is in the passageway, and has pilasters, medallions, and a cornice. The rear has two storeys and three bays, and contains casement windows.	II
Entrance Lodge, Whittington Grange; 53.27311°N 1.41848°W	—	18th to early 19th century	The lodge is in stone and has a slate roof and a large chimney. There are two storeys and three bays. On the front is a stone porch, and the windows are casements with leaded lights.	II
United Reformed Church; 53.23656°N 1.43030°W		1822	The church is in sandstone with a band, and a parapet with piers, panels, capping, and finials. There are two storeys and a front of three bays. In the centre is a doorway with Doric columns, an entablature, a semicircular fanlight, an archivolt, and impost bands, over which is an inscribed and dated plaque. The windows are casements with mullions and engraved lintels. On the right return are six bays, two gabled and containing round-arched windows with keystones, and a doorway in a moulded architrave with floral medallions and a cornice.	II
Lamp post, Church of St Mary and All Saints; 53.23593°N 1.42462°W	—	1824	The first gas lamp post in the town, it was later moved from Market Square to its present site in the churchyard. It is in cast iron, and has a chamfered plinth, a fluted column that has a bulbous base with leaf decoration, and a lamp with a finial.	II
4–16 Abercrombie Street; 53.24096°N 1.43050°W		Early 19th century	A terrace of seven stone houses with wide eaves and a hipped slate roof. There are two storeys, and each house has one bay. The windows, most of which are sashes, and the doorways, have engraved lintels with keystones.	II
Wall and gate piers, 9 Abercrombie Street; 53.24105°N 1.42866°W	—	Early 19th century	The high garden wall running along the street is in stone with stone coping, and is ramped. It contains stone gate piers.	II
2 Central Pavement; 53.23527°N 1.42811°W		Early 19th century	A red brick building on a corner site, with a bracketed eaves cornice, and a slate roof, hipped at the south. There are three storeys, three bays on Market Place and one on Central Pavement. In the ground floor are modern shop fronts, and the upper floors contain sash windows with stuccoed lintels.	II
39A Holywell Street; 53.23786°N 1.42570°W	—	Early 19th century	A red brick house, later an office, on a corner site, with moulded eaves and a hipped slate roof. There are three storeys, and one bay on each front. In the right return is a modern doorway and small shop window. The other windows are sashes with stuccoed wedge lintels.	II
27 Newbold Road; 53.23959°N 1.42818°W	—	Early 19th century	The house is roughcast with a pantile roof, two storeys and two bays. In the right bay of the ground floor is a sash window with Gothic glazing bars, and the other windows are three-light sliding casements.	II
2 and 4 Marsden Street; 53.23783°N 1.43056°W		Early 19th century	A pair of red brick houses on a corner site. No. 2 has three storeys, and No. 4 has two storeys and an attic. The doorways, including a passage doorway, have stuccoed wedge lintels. No. 2 has a round-headed window, and a window with a segmental head, and the other windows in both houses have flat heads, most with stuccoed wedge lintels.	II
69–79 Saltergate and railings 53.23766°N 1.42955°W		Early 19th century	A terrace of six red brick houses with sill bands and a moulded eaves cornice. There are three storeys and basements, and a symmetrical front of twelve bays, the middle four bays projecting under a pediment containing an oval plaque in the tympanum. Steps lead up to the round-arched doorways that have recessed fluted Roman Doric columns, an entablature, and an ornamental fanlight. The windows are sashes, and the basement areas are enclosed by iron railings.	II*
81 Saltergate; 53.23765°N 1.42992°W		Early 19th century	A stone house with a sill band, an eaves cornice, and a hipped slate roof. There are two storeys and four bays. The round-arched doorway has a fanlight, an engraved archivolt, impost bands, and a keystone. In the right bay is a segmental-arched carriage entrance. The windows are sashes with engraved wedge lintels, and in the roof are three dormers.	II
91–97 Saltergate; 53.23776°N 1.43077°W		Early 19th century	A terrace of four red brick houses on a stuccoed plinth, with moulded eaves, and a slate roof with coped gables and kneelers. There are three storeys and seven bays. The doorways have elliptical arches, impost bands, fanlights and keystones, and in the centre is a narrow arched entrance. The windows are sashes, those in the lower two floors with wedge lintels.	II
123 Saltergate; 53.23833°N 1.43552°W	—	Early 19th century	A stone house on a plinth, with quoins, and a moulded eaves cornice. There are two storeys, a double depth plan, and three bays. The central doorway has pilasters, an architrave shaped as a pediment, a fanlight, a moulded cornice, a keystone and a decorative frieze. The windows are sashes with plain architraves.	II
Bank Close; 53.22754°N 1.42021°W	—	Early 19th century	A house, later used for other purposes, it is in stone with a floor band, a corbelled eaves cornice and blocking course, and a hipped slate roof. There are two storeys and fronts of three and five bays. In the centre of the entrance front is a portico with columns, a frieze and a flat hood. In the centre of the southwest front is a doorway with engaged Ionic columns, a Greek key frieze, and a modillion cornice. The windows are sashes, those in the ground floor with panelled lintels and decorative keystones. The window above the portico has an architrave, pilasters, a frieze cornice on reeded brackets, and a panelled apron.	II*
Former coach house and stables, Bank Close; 53.22741°N 1.42005°W	—	Early 19th century	The buildings are connected to the house by walls containing gate piers, and they form a courtyard. They are in stone with quoins, a string course, and a slate roof, and are mainly in two storeys. They contain two arches with keystones, round-arched windows, and a door with an architrave and a radial fanlight.	II
Gatepiers, Bank Close Drive; 53.22860°N 1.41915°W	—	Early 19th century	The gate piers at the entrance to the drive are in stone, and are octagonal. Each pier has a cornice and a cap.	II
Former Coach House and wall 53.23862°N 1.45155°W	—	Early 19th century	The former coach house is in red brick with a hipped stone slate roof. There are two storeys and a gable containing a loft door, and two bays. The ground floor contains two large arches, and in the upper floor are sash windows. Attached to the coach house is a high wall containing a blocked carriageway arch with a keystone.	II
Former College of Art building 53.22409°N 1.41413°W	—	Early 19th century	The building, later used for other purposes, is in stone, on a plinth, with a moulded eaves cornice, and a hipped stone slate roof. There are two storeys and an entrance front of three bays. In the centre is a porch with Doric columns, a flat hood, and a round-arched doorway with a fanlight. To the right is a square bay window, and the other windows are sashes. At the rear are two round-headed windows.	II
Dorset House; 53.23787°N 1.42564°W	—	Early 19th century	A red brick house with a moulded eaves cornice and a hipped slate roof. There are three storeys and two bays. The doorway in the left bay has an architrave and a rectangular fanlight, the windows are sashes, and all the openings have stuccoed wedge lintels.	II
Entrance gates and railings, Dunston Hall; 53.26743°N 1.45248°W	—	Early 19th century	The entrance to the drive is flanked by stone piers with panels, and between them are decorative cast iron gates. Flanking the piers are low quadrant walls with railings, ending in similar piers.	II
Entrance block, Elder Yard Unitarian Chapel; 53.23725°N 1.42698°W		Early 19th century	The entrance block was originally a school that was enlarged in 1845–46. The front is in stone on a plinth, with a sill band, and a hipped pantile roof. There are two storeys and three bays. In the centre is a segmental arch with a keystone, and the windows are sashes. The rear was rebuilt in brick in 1900, and has five bays, a stone pediment, an eaves cornice, and a balustrade.	II
Elmwood; 53.27336°N 1.41774°W	—	Early 19th century	A stone house with a hipped tile roof, two storeys and three bays. On the ground floor are casement windows with square heads, the upper floor contains sash windows with chambered heads, and all have gothic glazing.	II
Hady House; 53.23315°N 1.41084°W	—	Early 19th century	A red brick house with a hipped slate roof, two storeys, three bays, and a rear wing. The central doorway has a moulded stone archivolt and a round-arched fanlight, and the windows are sashes with engraved lintels.	II
Holly House; 53.27319°N 1.42840°W	—	Early 19th century	A house later used for other purposes, it is in stone with quoins, a floor band, and a hipped slate roof. There are two storeys and three bays. In the centre is a doorway with Doric columns, engaged pilasters, mutules, a fanlight, and an open pediment. On the west front is a square bay window, the north front contains a canted bay window, most of the other windows are sashes, and there is a segmental-headed window with Gothic glazing.	II
Netherleigh; 53.23755°N 1.46259°W	—	Early 19th century	A stone house with a floor band, an eaves band, a blocking course, and a slate roof, hipped on the east side, and gabled on the north and south sides. There is a T-shaped plan, the north wing with a single storey, and the rest with two storeys. Most of the windows are sashes, and the doorway has a rectangular fanlight.	II
Newbold Fields; 53.26209°N 1.46896°W	—	Early 19th century	A stone house with a sill band and a hipped slate roof. There are two storeys and three bays. In the centre is a portico with a pedimented stone hood, and the windows are sashes.	II
Red House; 53.23353°N 1.45300°W	—	Early 19th century	The house is in red brick with an eaves cornice, two storeys and three bays. The doorway has fluted pilasters, a panelled frieze, and a trellis surround with palmate decoration. The windows are sashes.	II
Rose Cottage; 53.23165°N 1.45815°W	—	Early 19th century	A stone house with an eaves cornice and a hipped slate roof. There are two storeys and three bays. The doorway has panelled pilasters, a rectangular fanlight, and a cornice, and the windows are sashes.	II
The Nags Head Public House; 53.25192°N 1.44833°W		Early 19th century	The public house is in grooved stucco with a stone slate roof. There are two storeys, a main range, and a taller cross-wing on the right with a hipped gable. The doorway on the right has a moulded architrave and a hood on scrolled brackets, and the windows are casements with Gothic glazing.	II
Former Whittington Hall Hospital; 53.27655°N 1.41386°W	—	Early 19th century	A house, at one time used as a hospital, and later converted into flats. It is in stone with bands, an eaves cornice and blocking course, and a hipped slate roof. There are two storeys, and fronts of four and five bays. On the northwest front is a two-storey bay window, and at the southeast is a porch with a large segmental hood. All the windows are sashes.	II
Lodge, Whittington Hall Hospital; 53.27461°N 1.41297°W	—	Early 19th century	The lodge is in stone with a hipped slate roof and a tall chimney. There is a single storey and two bays. Above the doorway on the southwest front is a cornice.	II
Yew Tree House; 53.23705°N 1.45225°W	—	Early 19th century	The house is in stone with a red brick front and a hipped slate roof. There are two storeys and three bays. The central doorway has engaged columns, a radial fanlight with tracery, and a pediment, and the windows are sashes.	II
23 West Bars; 53.23562°N 1.43222°W		c. 1830	A red brick house with a sill band, moulded stone eaves, and a hipped 'slate roof. There are two storeys and three bays. Steps lead up to the central round-headed doorway that has a moulded architrave with fluted pilasters, and a semicircular fanlight. The windows are sashes with engraved lintels.	II
Gate piers, 23 West Bars; 53.23541°N 1.43231°W	—	c. 1830	The gate piers at the entrance to the drive are in stone. They have a square section, reeded panels, and stone caps.	II
St Thomas' Church, Brampton; 53.23175°N 1.45908°W		1830–32	A Commissioners' Church, the chancel was added in 1888, and the church was restored in 1903. The church is built in gritstone with freestone dressings and a slate roof. It consists of a nave, a chancel, a south vestry, a north organ chamber, and a west tower. The tower has three stages, angle buttresses, a west doorway with a window above, a clock face on the south side, and a roundel on the west side. The bell openings are paired and have a transom formed by a quatrefoil frieze, and at the top is an embattled parapet with eight pinnacles. There are pinnacles on the nave, and the east window has five lights.	II
St Thomas' Rectory; 53.23173°N 1.45523°W	—	Early to mid 19th century	The rectory is in brick with stone dressings and a slate roof. There are two storeys, three bays, and an additional bay on the left. The middle bay is gabled and contains a canted bay window, and there is a similar window in the added bay. The other windows are mullioned, and in the lower floor they are also transomed.	II
Town pump 53.23559°N 1.42889°W		Early to mid 19th century	The pump and bowl are in cast iron on a stone plinth that may be older. The plinth is octagonal, and has four steps on the north side, and is curved on the south. The pump has a square section, panelled sides, and a pyramidal cap with a finial. The bowl has an octagonal plinth and a ribbed stem, and a wide shallow bowl with a moulded base and edging.	II*
Former engineer's offices, Goods Yard; 53.23793°N 1.42115°W		1837	The office was built by the North Midland Railway, and has since been used for other purposes. It is in stone on a plinth, with quoins and a tile roof. There is a single storey at the front, two storeys at the rear, and three bays. In the centre is a pediment containing the coat of arms of the North Midland Railway in the tympanum. Below this is a doorway with a rectangular fanlight, and it is flanked by sash windows.	II
Former workhouse 53.23987°N 1.43056°W		1837–39	The workhouse, designed by Scott and Moffatt, was later used as a hospital, and subsequently partly demolished, and the remainder converted into flats. It is in red brick with stone dressings, bands, and a slate roof with a cupola. The middle section has four storeys and seven bays, the middle bay containing a doorway with a rusticated surround. The outer bays form full-height canted bay windows with a cornice and a pediment. The flanking wings have three storeys and three bays, and the windows are sashes.	II
Holy Trinity Church; 53.24022°N 1.42867°W		1838	The church was altered in 1888–89 by Samuel Rollinson, and the west choir vestry was added in 1938. The church is built in gritstone with freestone dressings and a slate roof. It consists of a nave, a chancel with a south organ chamber, a northeast vestry, a west choir vestry, and a west tower with flanking porches. The tower has four stages, angle buttresses with gabled tops, a west lancet window over which is a clock face, double lancet bell openings, and an arcaded parapet with triangular merlons and large corner pinnacles. Along the nave are lancet windows, and the east window is a three-light stepped lancet.	II
1, 3 and 3A Abercrombie Street; 53.24079°N 1.43012°W		c. 1840	A row of houses in stone with a floor band, and a hipped slate roof. There are two storeys, four bays, and a single-story outshut on the east side. The doorway on the front has a rectangular fanlight, and the windows are sashes. On the west side is a two-storey bay window with a pediment.	II
5 and 7 Abercrombie Street; 53.24088°N 1.42961°W		c. 1840	A pair of stone houses with a band, a moulded eaves cornice, and a hipped slate roof. There are two storeys and a west front of three bays. The houses contain French windows, and most of the other windows are sashes.	II
Garden wall and piers, 28 Abercrombie Street; 53.24115°N 1.42750°W		c. 1840	The coped stone wall encloses the garden along two roads. At the corner is a massive rounded stone corner post with a plinth and a pyramidal cap. Flanking the gates are gate piers.	II
Ashton Lodge; 53.24133°N 1.42762°W	—	c. 1840	A stone house with quoins, a floor band, wide eaves, and a hipped slate roof. There are two storeys and two bays. In the left return is a round-headed doorway with a fanlight, and on the front is a two-storey canted bay window.	II
Hurst House; 53.24104°N 1.42814°W		c. 1840	The house, later used for other purposes, is in stone with sill bands, sash windows, and a slate roof. The south front has three storeys and a pedimented gable. In the ground floor is a doorway with a stuccoed surround and a moulded cornice, and round-arched windows. The north front has two storeys and three bays. There is a former doorway with a stuccoed portico, a cornice and a blocking course, with an inserted window.	II
West Lawn; 53.24058°N 1.43026°W		c. 1840	The house has a stone front and red brick elsewhere, with quoins, bracketed eaves, and a hipped slate roof. There are two storeys and a front of three bays. In the centre is a trellis porch, and the windows are sashes.	II
Former grammar school 53.24077°N 1.42681°W		1846	The grammar school moved to another site in 1967, and the building has since been used for other purposes. It is in stone with quoins, a moulded floor band, and a tile roof with coped gables, kneelers and finials. The northern part has three storeys, three gables, and three bays, the upper floors with mullioned windows, and the ground floor windows also with transoms. The centre part has two gables, and a tower in the angle between them, and the southern part is recessed, with two storeys, a gable, and three bays.	II
Well at rear of 11 Beetwell Street; 53.23398°N 1.42671°W	—	19th century	The well head in the courtyard at the rear of the house is in brick, and has a handle, a beam and a roof.	II
52 Sheffield Road; 53.24181°N 1.42782°W	—	Mid 19th century	A red brick house in Gothic style with a slate roof. There are three storeys and a symmetrical front of three bays, the outer bays gabled with finials. The central doorway is round-headed with columns, above it is a Gothic-arched window with a balustrade, and at the top is a balustraded parapet. In the ground floor, the left bay has a square bay window, and in the right bay is a four-light window, the middle two lights angled outwards. The middle floor contains three-light windows with cusped heads, and in the top floor are two-light windows.	II
Building formerly occupied by the Sheepbridge Engineering Company; 53.26618°N 1.44245°W		Mid 19th century (probable)	The building is in red brick with stuccoed dressings, and a hipped slate roof. There are two storeys and ten bays, the middle two bays projecting under a pediment. On the front is a gabled porch containing a round-arched doorway with a fanlight, some of the windows are sashes, and others are replacements. On the roof is a cupola with a clock face, a domed top and a weathervane.	II
Churchyard walls and piers, Church of St Mary and All Saints; 53.23673°N 1.42401°W		19th century (probable)	The churchyard is enclosed by low stepped stone walls. These contain polygonal piers with pseudo-battlemented caps and shields.	II
Gatepiers, gates and wall, Hurst House; 53.24108°N 1.42757°W		19th century	The coped stone wall runs along the road, and is ramped up towards the house. It contains a doorway with a massive surround, a cornice on scrolled brackets and a blocking course. The iron gates, which have spear-shaped finials, are flanked by stone piers with moulded bands under the caps.	II
Former National Westminster Bank; 53.23580°N 1.43064°W	—	Mid 19th century	The building is in stone, with a floor band, and a slate roof with coped gables. There are two storeys and three gabled bays, with roundels in the gables. In the ground floor are two round-arched doorways with semicircular fanlights and keystones. The windows are mullioned and transomed in architraves.	II
Southern garden wall, Stud Farm Cottages; 53.22343°N 1.43360°W	—	19th century	The garden wall is in stone with wide coping. In the northeastern part of the wall are six brick Gothic arches.	II
The Vicarage; 53.25730°N 1.44453°W	—	Mid 19th century	The vicarage is in rusticated stone, with a floor band, and a roof with coped gables. There are two storeys, a double depth plan, and two bays. On the front are two gables, and the right bay contains a porch and a doorway with a Gothic arch. The windows are sashes, in the ground floor with flat heads, and in the upper floor with Gothic arches.	II
Former coachhouse stable, west of The Vicarage; 53.25736°N 1.44482°W	—	Mid 19th century	The building is in stone, and has a slate roof with coped gables. It contains two windows and garage doors.	II
Walls and gate piers, The Vicarage; 53.25713°N 1.44489°W	—	Mid 19th century	On the west side of the garden is a high stone stepped wall containing a doorway to the former school yard. Along the south boundary is a low wall, and stone gate piers with pyramidal caps.	II
Annunciation Church; 53.23956°N 1.43214°W		1854	The church, which was designed by Joseph Hansom, was extended at the west end in 1874. It is in stone, and consists of a nave with a clerestory, north and south aisles, the south aisle with a gabled Lady chapel, a north porch, and a chancel. At the west end is a broad tower-like structure with a large window flanked by buttresses, and a corner turret with a short spire.	II
Church of St John the Evangelist; 53.25731°N 1.44377°W		1857	The aisles were added to the church in 1957. It is built in gritstone with a slate roof, and consists of a nave, north and south aisles, a south porch, and a chancel with a south organ chamber and a north vestry. At the west end is a full-height buttress carrying an octagonal arcaded bellcote with a spirelet.	II
Market Hall; 53.23551°N 1.42950°W		1857	The market hall is in red brick with stone dressings, quoins, sill bands, corbelled eaves, and a slate roof. There are three storeys and a hollow rectangular plan. The ground floor is arcaded with rusticated pilasters and archivolts. In the centre of the east front is a tower with a clock face and an ogee-domed cupola.	II
Church and Chapel, Spital Cemetery; 53.23222°N 1.41618°W		1857	The church and chapel are joined, and are in Decorated style. They are in stone, and have tile roofs and two coped gables. Features include a short obelisk-type spire, and a steeple that has a broach spire with lucarnes.	II
Entrance wall, arch and gate piers, Spital Cemetery; 53.23337°N 1.41787°W	—	1857	The entrance to the cemetery is flanked by large gabled gate piers. On each side are stone walls which, on the left side, contain a gabled pointed arch.	II
Lodge, Spital Cemetery; 53.23331°N 1.41761°W		1857	The lodge is in stone with quoins and an L-shaped plan. The main part is gabled with two storeys and one bay, containing a bay window, and paired windows above with Gothic arches. To the left is a single-storey wing, and to the right is a truncated three-storey tower with a lancet window in each floor.	II
Physiotherapy Department; 53.23885°N 1.42420°W		1862	A Baptist chapel, later used for other purposes, it is in red brick with stone dressings and a slate roof. At the front are three bays, the middle bay convex under a moulded cornice and pediment, both with paired corbels. The bay contains a large round-arched window with a moulded arch and a corbelled impost band. Each outer bay has a projecting porch containing a round-arched window with impost blocks and a keystone, and on the inner face is a round-arched doorway with a fanlight. Above each porch is a blind panel, and on the left return are two storeys. In the upper floor are three large round-headed windows, and in the lower floor are five windows.	II
The Eagle Club; 53.25718°N 1.44522°W		1862–63	A school and master's house that was later extended, and then used for other purposes. The school is in rusticated stone on a plinth with a slate roof. There is a single storey, and on the front are two gables, with two gabled dormers between. The windows are mullioned and transomed. The house to the right has a half-hipped roof, two storeys and two bays. There is a round-arched porch, and the windows are sashes with Gothic arches.	II
Gate piers and walls, Church of St John the Evangelist; 53.25711°N 1.44369°W	—	Mid to late 19th century	The churchyard is enclosed on the west, east and south sides by coped stone walls, and the entrance is flanked by stone piers.	II
Wall, former school yard 53.25700°N 1.44519°W	—	Mid to late 19th century	The stone wall runs along the south side of the yard of the former school.	II
Central Methodist Church; 53.23725°N 1.42829°W		1869–70	The church is in stone on the front and red brick elsewhere, and is in Renaissance style. It has a plinth, bands, a cornice frieze and a modillion cornice. There are two storeys, five bays on the front and seven along the sides. On the front is a giant portico with two Ionic columns, square outer pilasters, and a pediment with a modillion cornice and a palmette finial. Behind it are three doorways with moulded architraves, broken pediments, and hanging lamps. In the upper floor are round-arched windows with moulded archivolts separated by pilasters.	II
Former Methodist Church; 53.23820°N 1.43056°W		1869–70	The former church is in red brick, with dressings in polychromatic brick and stone, eaves on stone brackets, and a slate roof. There are two storeys, a front of seven bays, turrets on three corners, and bowing at the rear. The doorway and windows have round-arched polychromatic heads, and Coade stone impost bands. The turrets have truncated pyramidal roofs, and crowns of iron balustrading.	II
37 Low Pavement; 53.23509°N 1.42853°W		Late 19th century	The shop, which has an earlier core, has a façade in red brick with stone dressings, a moulded cornice on consoles, and a parapet with ball finials. There are three storeys and three bays flanked by pilasters, with a pediment over the middle bay. The ground floor is rusticated and contains three round-headed arches, over which is a dentilled cornice and pedimented end consoles. The windows are sashes in architraves with aprons, and, in the middle floor, with ornamental friezes and pediments.	II
57 Low Pavement; 53.23519°N 1.42964°W	—	Late 19th century	The shop, which has an earlier core, has a façade in red brick with stone dressings, sill bands, and a stepped and corbelled brick eaves cornice, above which is a stone cornice and a brick blocking course. There are three storeys, and in the ground floor is a 19th-century shop front with pilasters and a cornice, over which is a fascia board. The upper floors contain sash windows, four in the middle floor and five in the top floor, all divided by pilasters.	II
Gates, piers and railings, Queen's Park; 53.23171°N 1.43492°W		Late 19th century	The gates, the piers flanking the pedestrian and carriageway entrances, and the railings are in cast iron. The gates have wrought iron scrolls, and central medallions with the arms of the town. The railings have spear head finials.	II
Stephenson Memorial Hall; 53.23660°N 1.42336°W		1879	The hall was extended in 1898, and later the original part has been used as a museum, and the extension as a theatre. The building is in red brick with stone dressings and a slate roof, and is in Gothic style. It is mainly in two storeys, and has an irregular style with a tower in the northwest angle. The tower has a short spire and a corbelled parapet that is gabled on each front.	II
47 and 47A Low Pavement; 53.23515°N 1.42920°W		1885	A shop in red brick, with dressings in stone and terracotta, flanking pilasters surmounted by ball finials, a moulded eaves cornice, and a panelled blocking course. In the centre is an ornate, shaped pediment containing a date plaque, and with a ball finial. There are three storeys and three bays. In the ground floor is a modern shop front. The upper floors contain sash windows, paired in the central bay of the upper floor, and below them is an oriel window in a wide segmental arch.	II
38 Glumangate; 53.23709°N 1.42941°W		1887	A red brick building with a stuccoed sill band and a dentilled eaves cornice. There are two storeys and a symmetrical front of five bays. The doorway has a fanlight and a keystone, the windows are sashes, and all have segmental heads.	II
Former National Union of Miners Offices; 53.23782°N 1.43418°W		1893	The office building, later used for other purposes, is in red brick with sandstone dressings, and a Welsh slate roof with coped gables. There are two storeys and an L-shaped plan, with a front of seven bays, the right five bays symmetrical. The middle of these bays has a crow-stepped gable, and contains a round-arched doorway with pilasters. To the left is a gabled bay containing a two-storey canted bay window, and the left bay contains a doorway. The ground floor windows have segmental heads, and those in the upper floor have flat heads and are set in semicircular arches.	II
Social Services Department building 53.23957°N 1.42895°W		1895	The building is in red brick with stone dressings, a string course, an eaves band, a cornice, and a slate roof with coped gables. There are two storeys, and a symmetrical front with a central block of five bays, and pedimented outer wings. The central doorway has a massive elaborate surround with a round-arched entrance, an ornamental entablature, and ball finials. All the ground floor windows have segmental heads and keystones, and those in the upper floor of the central block have round-arched heads, moulded archivolts, and an impost band. The outer wings are flanked by rusticated pilasters. In the upper floor are three windows, the middle light with a round arch, and a circular window above the outer lights. There is also a circular window in each tympanum.	II
St Bartholomew's Church; 53.27300°N 1.42496°W		1896	The church, which replaced an earlier church on the site, is in gritstone with freestone dressings and a slate roof, and is in Decorated style. It consists of a nave with a clerestory, north and south aisles, a chancel with a south organ chamber and a northeast steeple. The steeple has a tower with three stages, buttresses, a south doorway, and a broach spire.	II
Lamp post outside 35 Low Pavement; 53.23510°N 1.42834°W	—	Between 1896 and 1902	The lamp post is in cast iron, and has a circular base with an inset medallion and a fluted plinth. On this is a foliate bulb and a tall, slender column with a decorative collar and a ladder rest. It has a tulip-design baluster top, and a half-circle bracket decorated with scrolls and a cast flower. On the top is s replacement lantern.	II
Outbuilding at rear of 11 Beetwell Street; 53.23385°N 1.42672°W	—	Late 19th to early 20th century	The building, which encloses a courtyard, is in red brick with a slate roof. There are two storeys and an external staircase. The building contains a central carriageway arch and sash windows.	II
Lamp standard outside 2 Central Pavement; 53.23523°N 1.42815°W		Late 19th to early 20th century	The lamp standard is in cast iron. It has a round fluted plinth with a medallion, on which is a tall round shaft that has a bulbous foot with foliate moulding. At the top is a scrolled swan neck lamp bracket.	II
Lamp standard outside 63 Low Pavement; 53.23528°N 1.43000°W		Late 19th to early 20th century	he lamp standard is in cast iron. It has a round fluted plinth with a medallion, on which is a tall round shaft that has a bulbous foot with foliate moulding. At the top is a scrolled swan neck lamp bracket.	II
The Homestead; 53.23986°N 1.46304°W	—	1903	The house was designed by Raymond Unwin, and is in rusticated gritstone, with full height corner buttresses, wide bracketed eaves at the sides and rear, and a hipped tile roof. There are two storeys with attics, and two full height bow windows. The other windows are mullioned with small panes, and there is a four-light dormer window. The doorways have hood moulds.	II
Former Offices of the Markham Company; 53.23390°N 1.41971°W		c. 1906	The building is in red brick with stone dressings, on a plinth, with quoins, sill bands, an eaves band, a modillion cornice, and a slate roof with coped gables. There are two storeys and seven bays, and over the middle three bays is a pediment with a rosette in the tympanum, under which is a frieze with the name of the company. In the centre is a doorway with pilasters, a round-headed fanlight, a modillion cornice on consoles and a frieze. The windows are sashes, the window over the doorway has a segmental pediment, and is flanked by round windows. The other windows in the upper floor have architraves, cornices, and friezes, and in the ground floor they have architraves, and cornices on consoles.	II
Former Williams and Glyn's Bank; 53.23640°N 1.42564°W		1907	The bank, on a curved corner site, is in stone with a high basement, on a plinth, with a frieze, a modillion cornice, and a parapet with an open balustrade. The curved part has eleven bays, between which are giant engaged Ionic columns. The further three bays at the rear of both sides are rusticated. The windows have moulded architraves, those in the ground floor with triple keystones. The doorway has a round-arched fanlight and a segmental pediment on consoles, and above it is a plaque containing arms and flanked by eagles.	II
Saint Helena School; 53.23981°N 1.42652°W		1911	The school was designed by George H. Widdows and has since become part of the University of Derby. It is in red brick with stone dressings and a tile roof. The school has a central polygonal block with a cupola, with wings radiating from the corners, giving an X-shaped plan, and an additional wing stretches towards the road. This wing has two storeys and an attic, and five bays, the three inner bays projecting and gabled. In the centre is a canted stone porch, over which is a canted bay window with a parapet. The radial wings have two storeys, a double modillion cornice and hipped roofs.	II
Statue of Willam Edwin Harvey; 53.23785°N 1.43404°W	—	1915	The statue, by Joseph Whitehead, depicts William Edwin Harvey, a Member of parliament and one of the founders of the Derbyshire Miners' Association. It is in white stone on a rough hewn plinth, and also includes a Davy lamp, a pick, and leaves. On the plinth is an inscription.	II
Statue of James Haslam; 53.23789°N 1.43424°W	—	1915	The statue, by Joseph Whitehead, depicts James Haslam, a Member of parliament and one of the founders of the Derbyshire Miners' Association. It is in white stone on a rough hewn plinth, and also includes a Davy lamp, a pick, and leaves. On the plinth is an inscription.	II
Whittington War Memorial; 53.27011°N 1.42595°W		c. 1920	The war memorial stands in a trianglular area at a road junction. It is in stone, and consists of a square shaft with wreaths, on a vermiculated plinth on a stepped base. On the top is a cap, and a finial with a plain stone cross on each face.	II
Bandstand, Queen's Park; 53.23237°N 1.43511°W		1922	The bandstand has an octagonal plan, a rusticated stone plinth, and slim cast iron columns. These have foliate moulding, and composite capitals. They carry a pagoda roof with a finial and wide eaves. There is a cast iron balustrade with round arches and ball finials.	II
Hasland War Memorial; 53.22156°N 1.40843°W		1922	The war memorial stands at the entrance to Eastwood Park. It is in white marble, and consists of a statue depicting an infantryman with a rifle, wearing a cap. This stands on a square pedestal with a two-stage moulded cap, on a sandstone base of two steps. On the pedestal is an inscription and the names of those lost in the First World War. A marble stone on the upper step of the base has an inscription and the names of those lost in the Second World War.	II
War memorial, Church of St Mary and All Saints; 53.23658°N 1.42426°W		Early 20th century	The war memorial in the churchyard is in white stone, and consists of a crucifix on a tapering shaft. This stands on an octagonal plinth on four octagonal steps. There is lettering on the bottom step, and carving on the plinth.	II
Winding Wheel; 53.23721°N 1.42436°W		1922–23	The first part was built as a cinema, and a ballroom block was added to the left in about 1930. They are steel-framed, and have external applied timber framing and render. The right block has two storeys and nine bays, with gables over the middle three bays. The middle three bays contain an entrance with an acanthus cornice, and is flanked by shop fronts. In the upper floor the windows are mullioned and transomed, and in the middle is an oriel window. The left block has five bays, with an entrance in each outer bay and a shop front between in Art Deco style. Above are mullioned and transomed windows, and an oriel window in the left bay.	II
Conservatory, Queen's Park; 53.23193°N 1.43384°W		1930	The conservatory has a base of red brick on a plinth, with moulded window frames, and a cruciform plan. There is a dentilled cornice, a hipped roof with ball finials, and a central domed cupola with a finial. The entrance on the north side has double doors, and a pediment with a finial.	II
War memorial and steps 53.23632°N 1.43247°W		1933–38	The steps are in front of Chesterfield Town Hall, the war memorial was added in 1954, and they are in Portland stone. The steps rise to a terrace with a semicircular front and a balustrade. The steps also have a balustrade, ending in piers with planting urns. The war memorial consists of a chest tomb on the top balustrade with bronze flaming torches.	II
Chesterfield Town Hall; 53.23682°N 1.43234°W		1937–38	The town hall is in orange brick with Portland stone dressings, a moulded eaves cornice, a brick parapet with sections of stone balustrading, and hipped tile roofs. There are two storeys, a rusticated basement and a sub-basement, and a front of 23 bays. In the centre is a portico with six giant Corinthian columns, and a pediment with an oval window. In the other bays are sash windows, the windows in the lower floor of the end bays surrounded by columns and curved pediments. The sides have seven bays, the middle three bays recessed behind giant Corinthian columns, and at the rear is a central projecting bow.	II
Curved Reclining Form (Rosewall); 53.23472°N 1.43300°W		1960–62	A statue by Barbara Hepworth, it is in hard limestone on a rectangular plinth in a shallow tiled pool alongside Future Walk. It is in the form of two interlocking curved forms, with twin apertures, roughly oval in shape.	II
Chesterfield Courthouse; 53.23611°N 1.43363°W		1963–65	The magistrates' court house, which has been converted for other purposes, is in reinforced concrete, with decorative stone cladding, and timber roofs clad with copper sheeting. There are three storeys, and the plan is of a double fan. Many of the bays are gabled.	II
Gate piers, Tapton Manor, Grange and Grove; 53.24791°N 1.40516°W		Undated	The gate piers at the entrance to the drive are in stone, they are rusticated, and have pyramidal caps.	II
