= Royal Oak, Chesterfield =

Historic pub in Derbyshire, England

Royal Oak
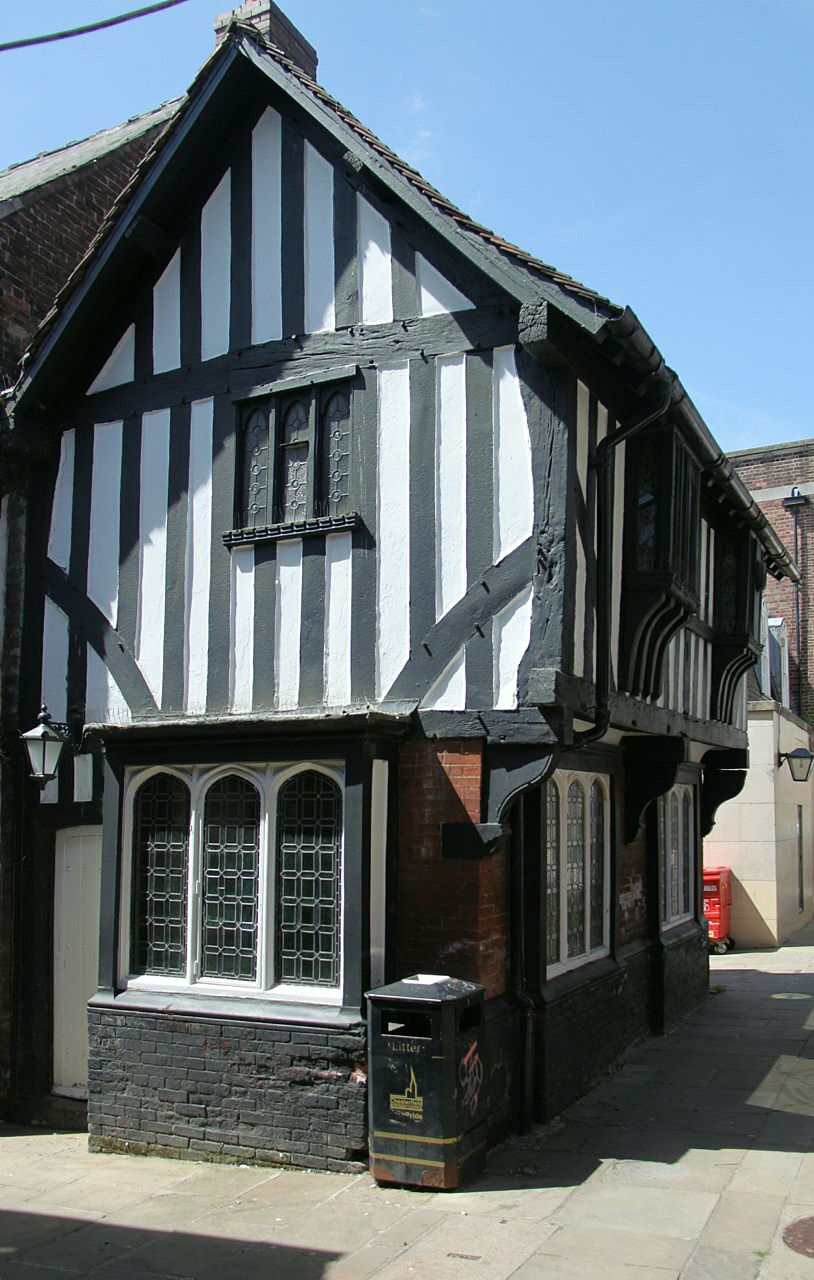
- Royal Oak, Chesterfield in 2021

- Location within Derbyshire

General information
- Location: The Shambles, Chesterfield, Derbyshire, England
- Coordinates: 53.235448°N 1.427724°W
- Year built: 16th century
- Renovated: 18th century (added); Late 19th century (restored)

Listed Building – Grade II*
- Official name: Ye Royal Oak
- Designated: 15 July 1971
- Reference no.: 1334732

The Royal Oak Inn is a Grade II* listed public house, located on The Shambles in Chesterfield, Derbyshire, England.

== History ==
The building dates back to the 16th century, and features a timber frame with close studding. A plaque on the exterior claims that The Royal Oak was built in the 12th century, and that it was a rest-house for the Knights Templar.

On 15 July 1971, it was designated a Grade II* listed building.

The pub was sold in August 2021, and eventually reopened under the name Ye Royal Oak.

== See also ==
- Grade II* listed buildings in Chesterfield
- Listed buildings in Chesterfield, Derbyshire
