= Tapton House =

Country house in Derbyshire, England

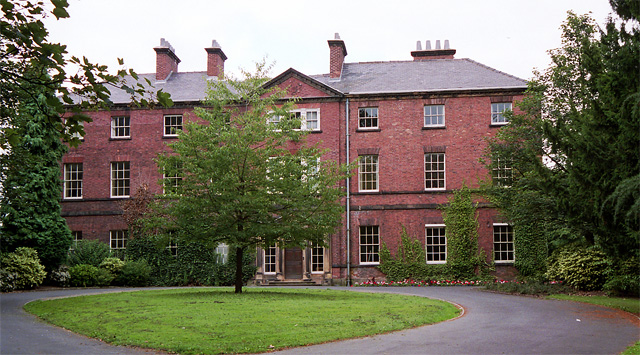

- Location within Derbyshire

General information
- Location: Tapton, England
- Coordinates: 53°14′42.000″N 1°24′49.788″W
- Ordnance Survey: SK3921372156
- Year built: Late 18th century

Design and construction
- Designations

Listed Building – Grade II*
- Official name: Tapton House
- Designated: 13 March 1968
- Reference no.: 1088335

Tapton House, in Tapton, Derbyshire, England, was once the home of engineer George Stephenson, who built the first public railway line in the world to use steam locomotives. Tapton has been a gentleman's residence, a ladies' boarding school and a co-educational school.

Tapton House grounds are now open for free use by the general public of Chesterfield to walk around and visit the Tapton Gardens. The grounds are also shared with the Tapton Park Innovation Centre. The House itself is now rented out as offices by Chesterfield Borough Council, and is a Grade II* listed building.

== History ==
Tapton House was constructed in the late 18th century by the Wilkinson family of bankers, who also helped fund the construction of the Chesterfield Canal. English mechanical engineer George Stephenson, builder of the first public railway line in the world to use steam locomotives, leased the house from the family from 1832 until his death in 1848.

The house then was bought by Charles Paxton Markham, Director of Staveley Coal and Iron Company and three times mayor of the town, in 1871 and became the family home until 1925, when he gave the 200 acres (0.81 km^{2}) of parkland to the Borough of Chesterfield. The borough turned the house into a school and in 1931, the first pupils passed through its doors as Tapton House Central Selective School. After the Second World War under the Education Act 1944 it became a co-educational secondary school, Tapton House School. The school continued to teach students until 1993 when it closed. After refurbishment in September 1994 it became a college of further and higher education for the people of Chesterfield and the surrounding area, known as The Tapton House Campus of Chesterfield College. The College returned the building to the borough council in 2018. It is currently rented out as office space.

=== George Stephenson (1781–1848) ===
George Stephenson, born in 1781, had already become a nationally known figure before he came to Chesterfield in the 1830s to construct the North Midland Railway which stretches 72 miles (116 km) from Derby to Leeds. His son Robert designed the historically important steam locomotive named Rocket for the Rainhill Trials at Liverpool in 1829.

He became so attached to Chesterfield that he spent the rest of his life in the area. Tapton House was his home for the last ten years of his life, until his death in August 1848 at the age of 67. Stephenson was buried in the Holy Trinity Church on Newbold Road, Chesterfield.

== Tapton Park Innovation Centre ==
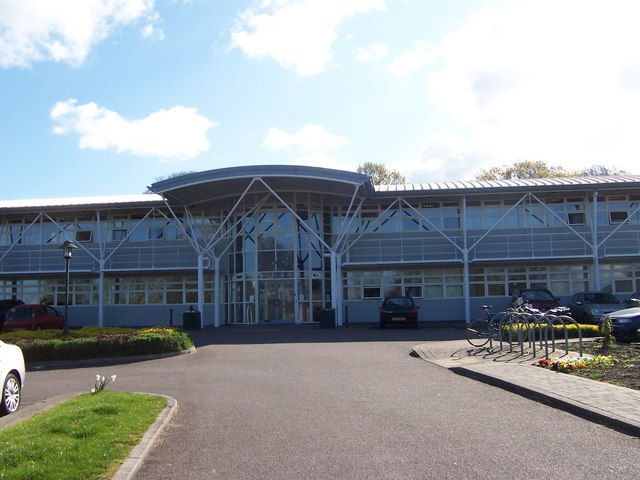
Tapton Park Innovation Centre

The centre developed out of a partnership between Chesterfield Borough Council, North Derbyshire Chamber of Commerce and North Derbyshire Training and Enterprise Council. As well as funding from the partners the scheme was supported by the Single Regeneration Budget and European Union.

The futuristic building reflects the forwards thinking of George Stephenson. It is designed to provide modern accommodation to stimulate innovation and nurture growth amongst technology- and knowledge-based business. The centre has 39 rooms, 10 "rent-a-desks" and, following its opening in spring 1997, accommodates more than 40 companies.

== Peace Gardens ==
Opened in August 1947 by Mayor, Councillor Miss Florence Robinson, the gardens were constructed by the Parks Department Under the supervision of Mr J. E. Tindale, Park Superintendent.

== Castle Hill ==
This is an earth mound believed to be the site of a motte-and-bailey castle. The earth mound or motte would have been the site of the shell keep, being several buildings surrounded by heavy wooden palisade. Around 600 castles of this type are recorded and were built between 1000 and 1200 AD. The castle was incorporated within the grounds of Tapton House in the late 17th century.

== See also ==
- Grade II* listed buildings in Chesterfield
- Listed buildings in Chesterfield, Derbyshire
