= Peacock Inn, Chesterfield =

Inn in Chesterfield, Derbyshire, England

Coordinates: 53.2353°N 1.4300°W

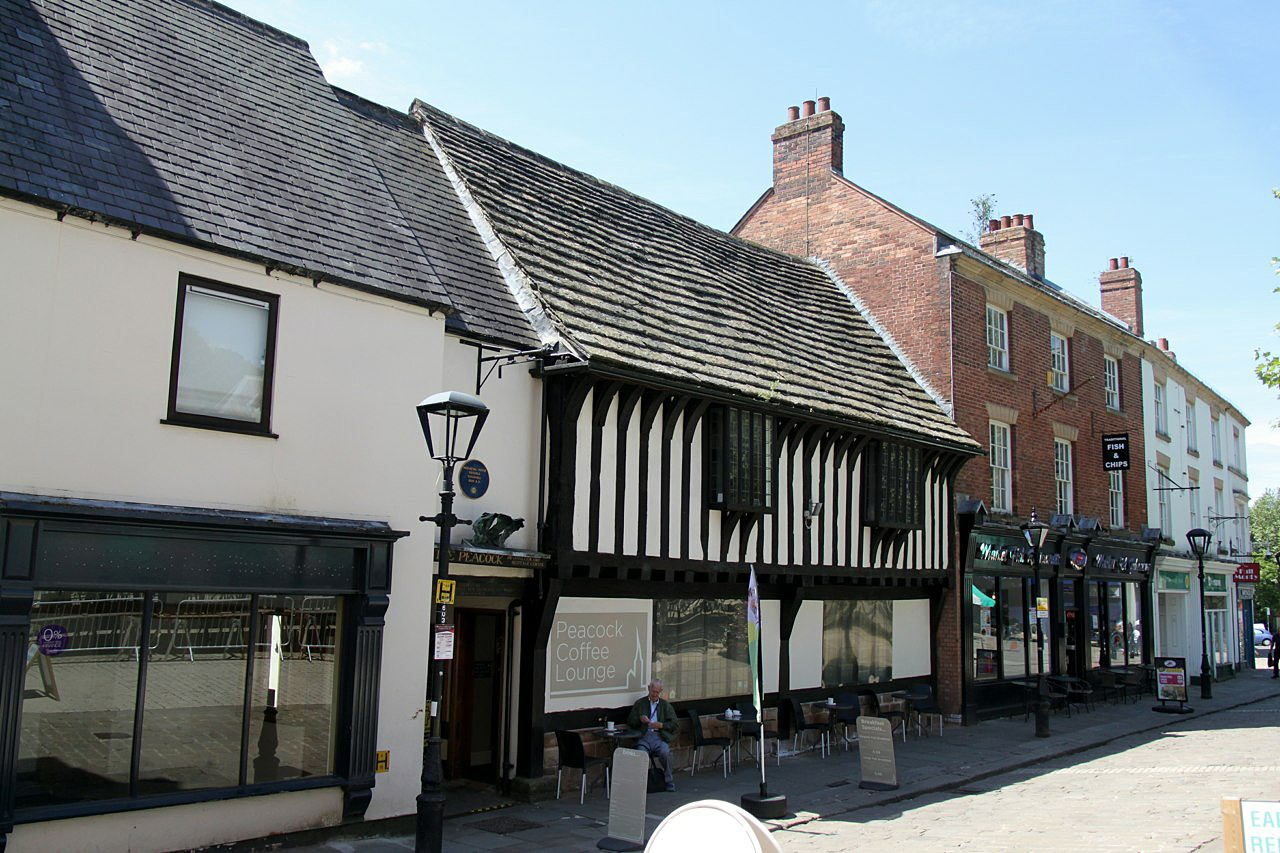
The Peacock

The Peacock Inn is a grade-II listed building located on Low Pavement in Chesterfield, Derbyshire.

== History ==
The former Public House dates back to the 16th century, and features a timber frame on a stone plinth. The building is thought to have been a Guildhall, or a residence for the Revells of Carnfield Hall.

== See also ==
- Listed buildings in Chesterfield, Derbyshire

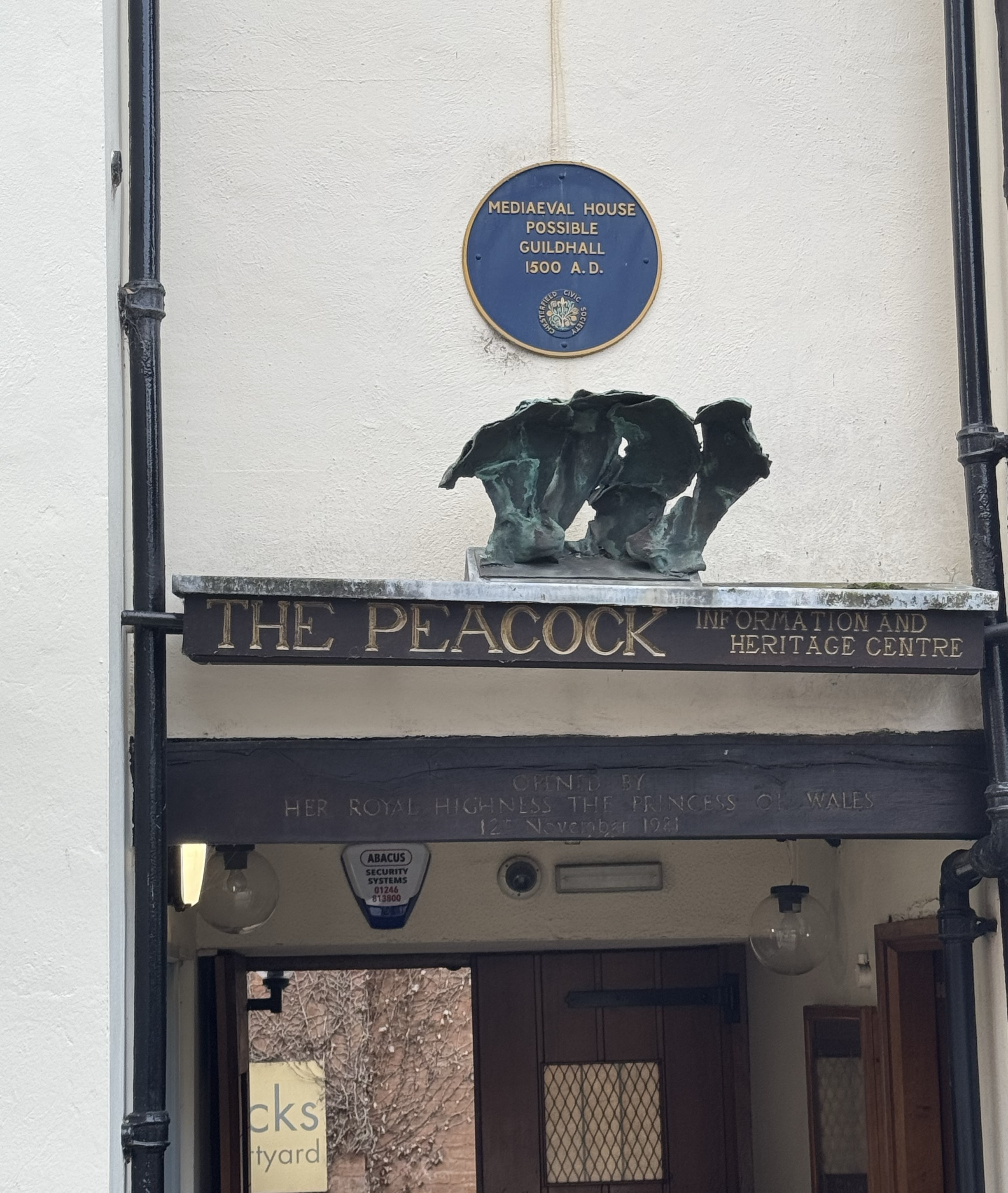
