= Low Pavement, Chesterfield =

Street in Chesterfield, England

Coordinates: 53.2352°N 1.4292°W

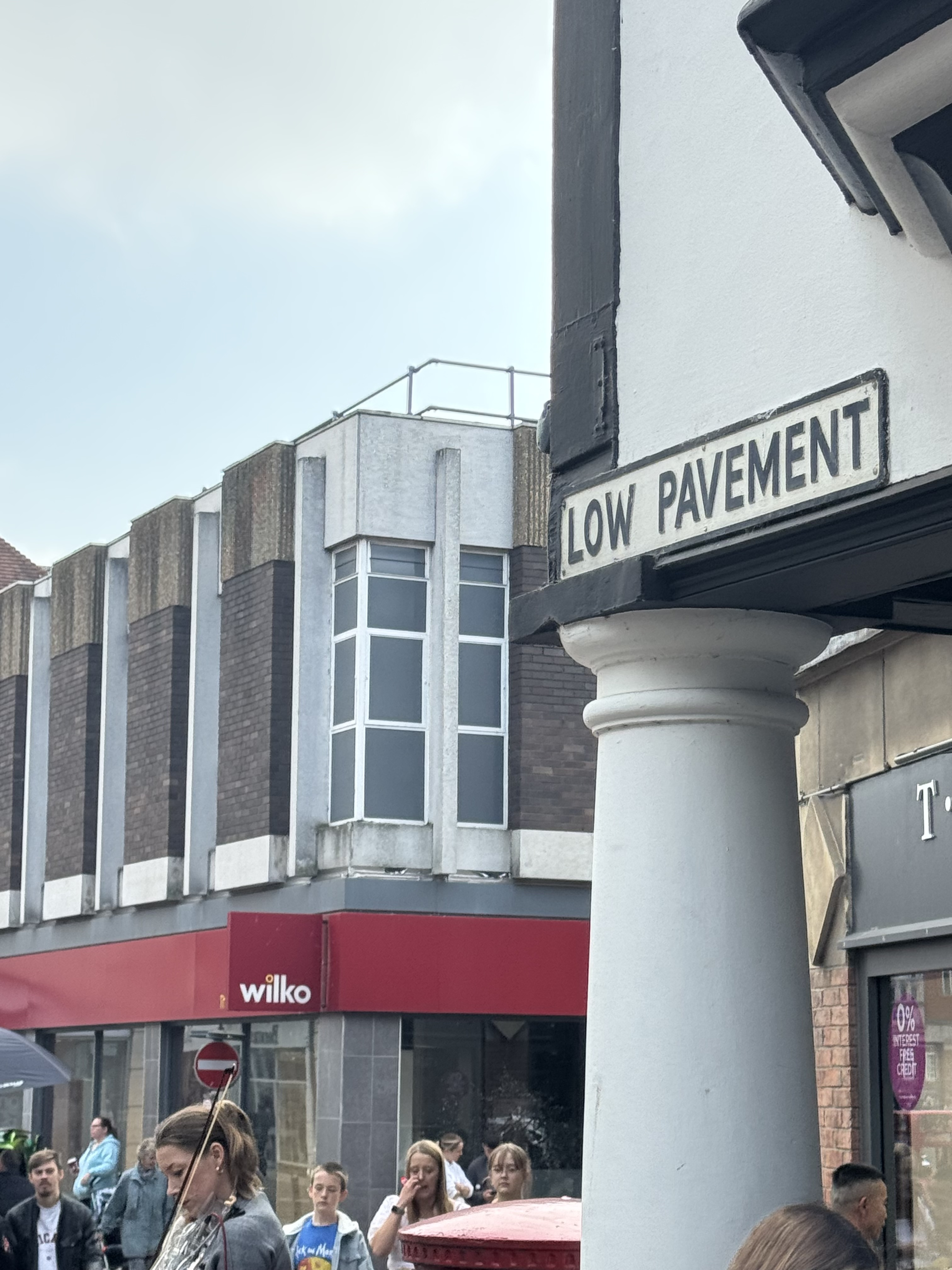
Low Pavement

Low Pavement is a short street located in Chesterfield, Derbyshire, England. It connects West Bars to Vicar Lane. The street is a shopping district.

Low Pavement, as well as the adjoining roads and the market square, is part of Chesterfield Town Centre Conservation Area. The road was also included in the Revitalisation that was awarded a European Heritage medal in 1981.

A shorter road, Central Pavement, connects the road to the east to Vicar Lane.

== History ==
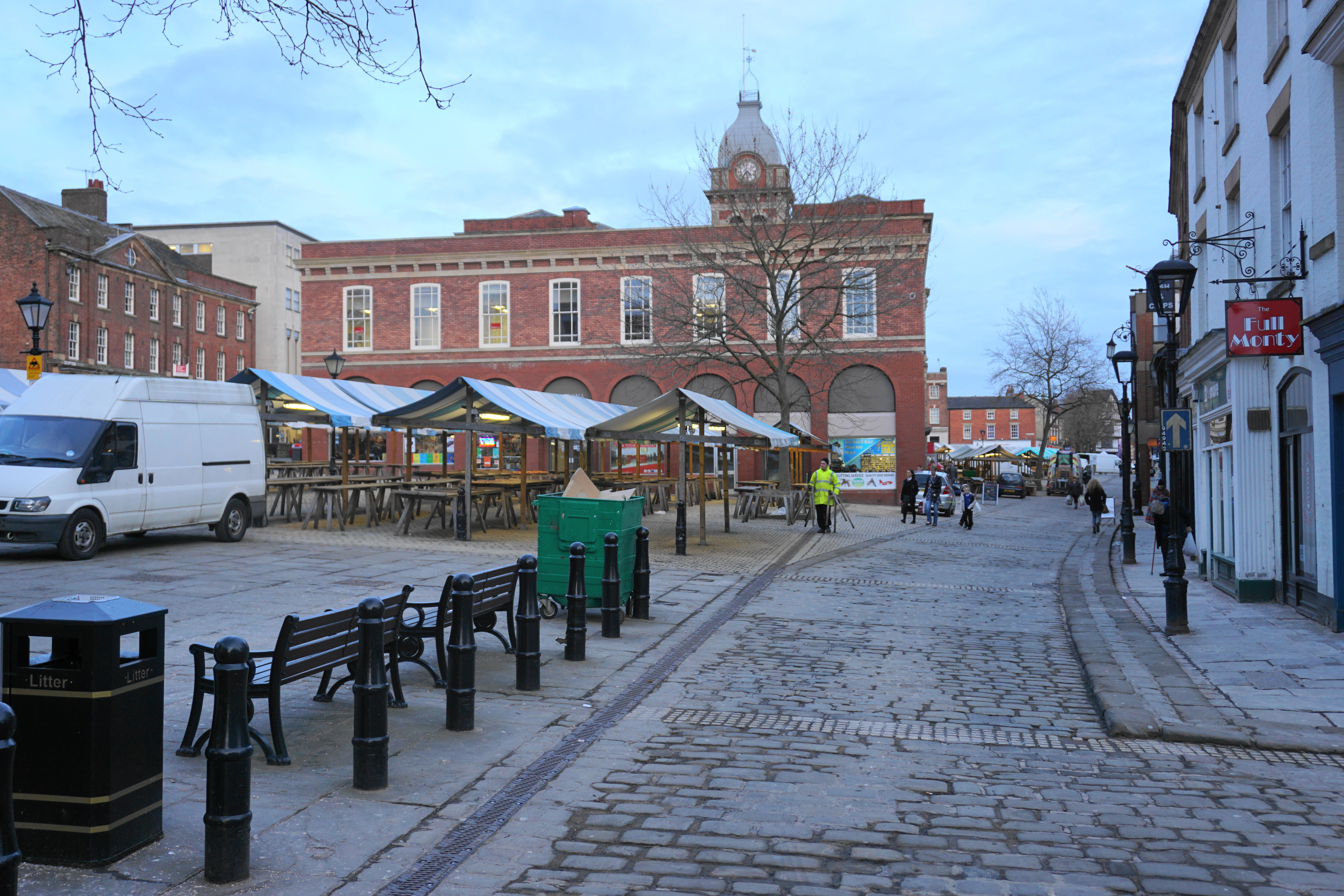
Chesterfield Market at Low Pavement.

Chesterfield Market, one of the largest open air markets in the country, dating back to at least 1165 stands on the street. In the Medieval period the properties in Low Pavement were built on the northern edge of burgage plots that extended southwards beyond Beetwell Street to the River Hipper. The plots were long and narrow and subsequently built on so that a warren of alleyways developed behind them. It is known that the route of Low Pavement existed during the Mediaeval period, but it does not appear by name in any contemporary charters. W. E. Godfrey hypothesises that it may have been named "Cowgate" at the time, a name which does appear but which is of uncertain location.

From 1882 until 1927, the street was a terminus of the Chesterfield tramway. In 1889, the Derbyshire Miners' Association moved its headquarters to the former Falcon Temperance Cafe, on the street, and remained there until 1893, when its purpose-built headquarters were opened.

During the 1970s, the town council considered demolishing a large portion of the buildings on the street to construct The Pavements Shopping Centre, the buildings together were considered to be of 'township merit' and many became listed during this period giving them legal protection from unauthorised development or demolition. In early 1982, The Illustrated London News in a feature on Derbyshire noted the shops on Low Pavement had been in "a sad state of dilapidation", but were being "beautifully restored". The facades of many were left.

In November 1981, The Pavements Shopping Centre was officially opened by the then Prince Charles and Diana, Princess of Wales. In July 2021 it was reported that Chesterfield Borough Council, who already owned the freehold, had acquired the leasehold of the shopping centre.

== Listed buildings ==
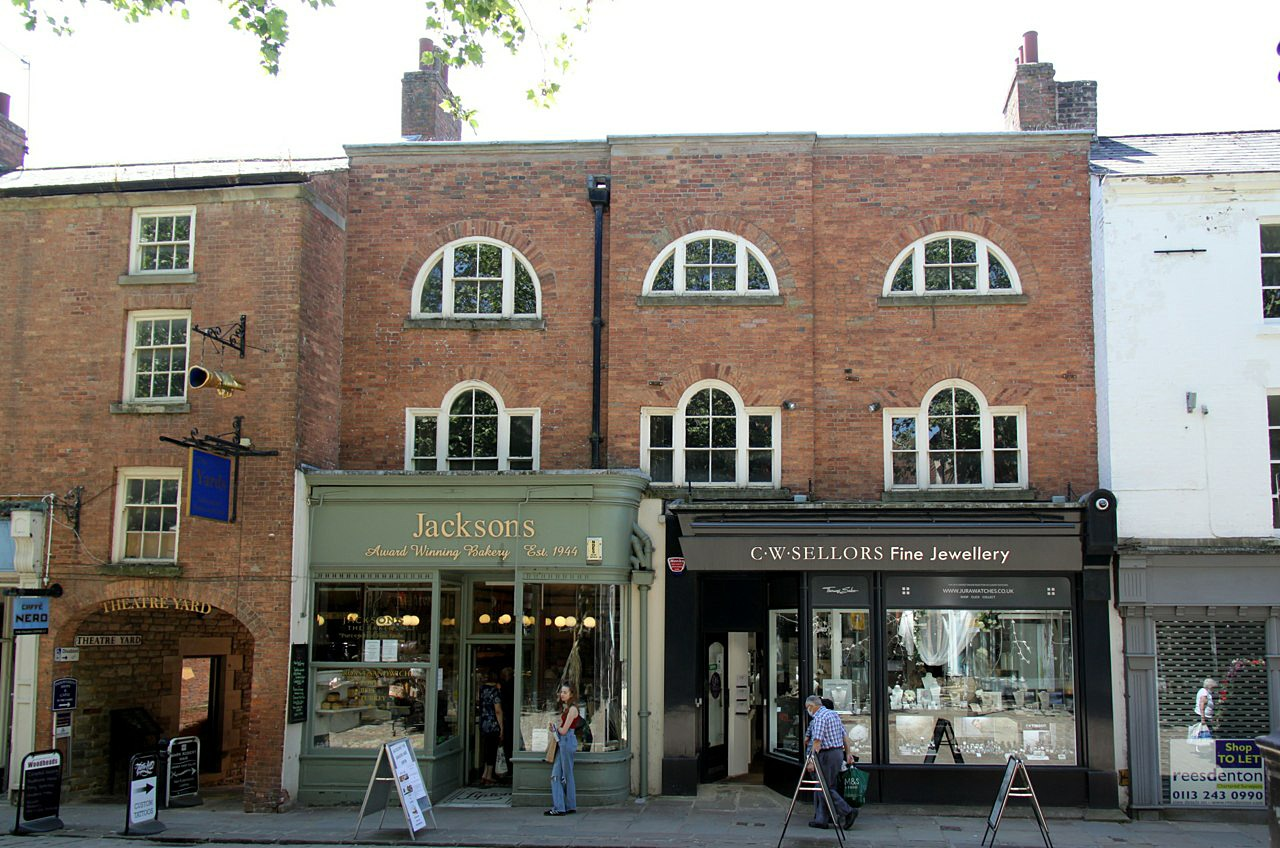
5 and 7 Low Pavement

- 1 and 1A Low Pavement (Grade II listed)
- 3 Low Pavement (Grade II listed)
- 5 and 7 Low Pavement (Grade II listed)
- 9 Low Pavement (Grade II listed)
- 35 Low Pavement (Grade II listed)
- 39 Low Pavement (Grade II listed)
- 41 Low Pavement (Grade II listed)
- 43 Low Pavement (Grade II listed)
- 45 Low Pavement (Grade II listed)
- 61, 61A, 61B 63 and 63C Low Pavement (Grade II listed)
- 67 Low Pavement (The Peacock) (Grade II listed)
- 69 and 71 Low Pavement (Grade II listed)
- 73 and 75 Low Pavement (Grade II listed)
- 77 Low Pavement (Grade II listed)

In addition, the Lamp standard outside 63 Low Pavement is Grade II listed, as is the Lamp post outside no. 35.
