= Chesterfield Market =

Open-air market in Chesterfield, England

Coordinates: 53.2354°N 1.4290°W

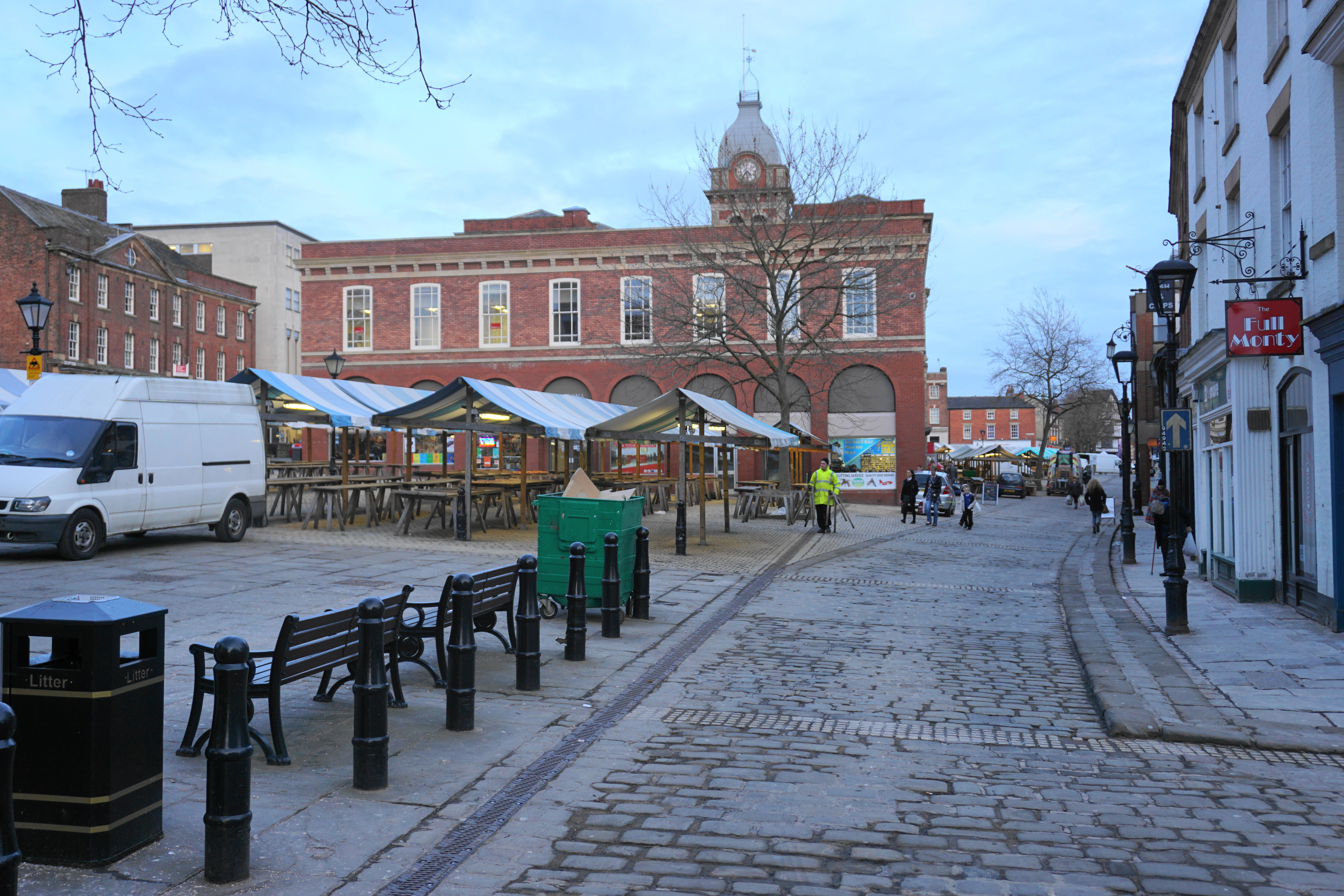
Chesterfield Market

Chesterfield Market is an open-air market in the town of Chesterfield, Derbyshire, England. It consists of a large market square, with extensive stalls outside, selling fruit, flowers, clothing, hardware and groceries. The Market square stands between the streets of Low Pavement and High Street.

The market is one of the largest open air markets in the country, and dates back to at least 1165. The original market square stood further north, close to the Church of St Mary and All Saints.

== History ==
The market has been held in Chesterfield since at least 1165, and a market charter was granted to the town in 1204. The market moved to its current location in the early 13th century.

== See also ==
- Chesterfield Market Place railway station
- The Shambles, Chesterfield
