= Vicar Lane Shopping Centre =

Outdoor shopping centre in Chesterfield, Derbyshire, England

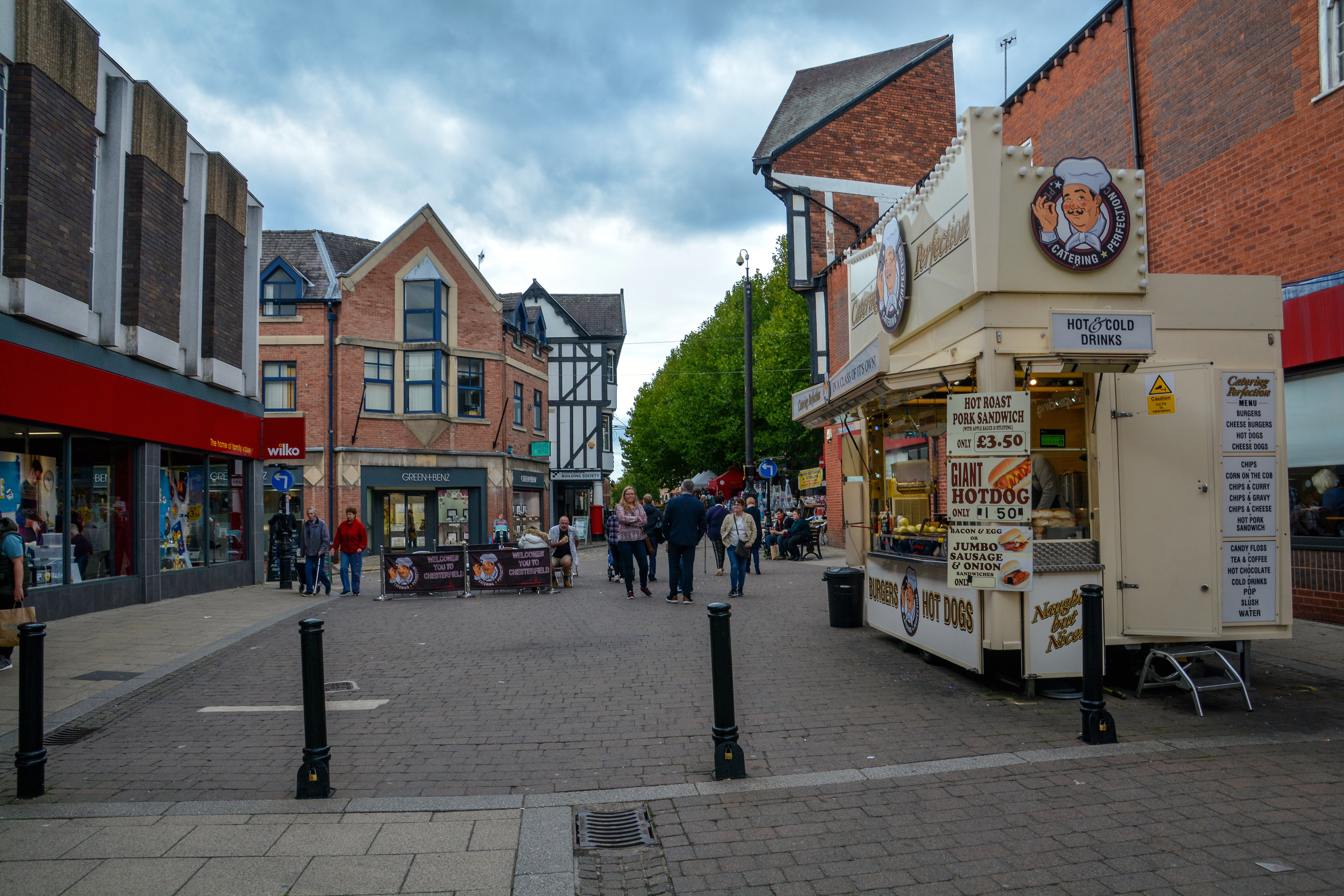
- Vicar Lane, Chesterfield
- Location: Chesterfield, Derbyshire, England
- Coordinates: 53.234859°N 1.428153°W
- Opened: 2000
- Num. of stores: 29
- Floors: 1
- Parking: 400 spaces
- Public transit: Chesterfield Coach Station
- Website: www.vicarlaneshoppingcentre.co.uk

Vicar Lane Shopping Centre is an outdoor shopping centre in Chesterfield, Derbyshire, England. It lies in the town centre, close to the main Chesterfield Market.

The centre was opened in 2000, and it contains a number of chain stores, as well as a number of independent stores.

== History ==
The lane was historically a residential street, with directories from the 19th century noting a number of residents.

An indenture dated June 11, 1783, related to the local churches charities notes a number of dwellings and tenements on Vicar Lane, located near Market Place.

During the 20th century, the Joe Davis' Billiards Saloon was located on the lane, notably being the venue of the 1933 World Snooker Championship.
