= Church of St Mary and All Saints, Chesterfield =

Chesterfield Parish Church
- The Parish Church of St Mary and All Saints, Chesterfield
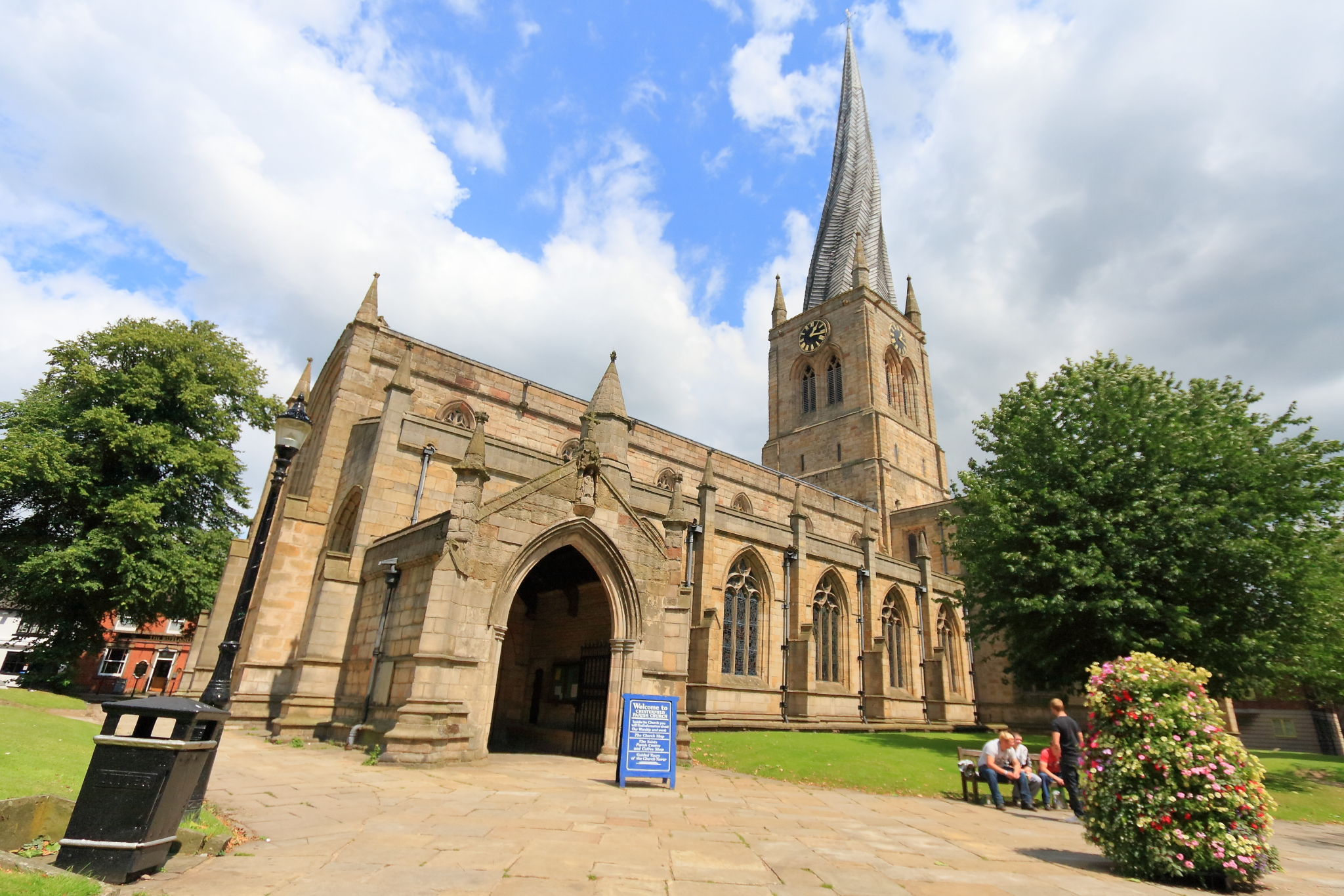
- Chesterfield Parish Church
- 53.2361°N 1.4241°W
- Location: Chesterfield, Derbyshire
- Country: England
- Denomination: Church of England
- Website: Official Website

History
- Status: Parish Church
- Dedication: St Mary and All Saints

Architecture
- Functional status: Active
- Architectural type: Gothic
- Completed: 14th century

Listed Building – Grade I
- Official name: Parish Church of St Mary and All Saints
- Designated: 15 July 1971
- Reference no.: 1334708

Specifications
- Materials: Lead

Administration
- Province: Canterbury
- Diocese: Derby
- Archdeaconry: Chesterfield
- Deanery: North East Derbyshire
- Parish: Chesterfield

Clergy
- Vicar: Canon Patrick Coleman

Chesterfield Parish Church is an Anglican church dedicated to Saint Mary and All Saints, in Chesterfield, Derbyshire, England. Building of the church began in 1234 AD, though the present church dates predominantly from the 14th century. Designated a Grade I listed building in 1971, St Mary's is best known for its twisted and leaning spire (known as the Crooked Spire). It is the largest parish church in the Diocese of Derby and forms part of the Archdeaconry of Chesterfield. In 1994, it also became the UK's only representative in the Association of the Twisted Spires of Europe; of the 72 member churches, it is deemed to have the greatest lean and twist.

== History ==
Evidence of a Christian church on the site dates to the Anglo-Saxon era; a font thought to date from 890 to 1050 AD can be seen in the south transept of the current church. There is mention of the 'Church in Chesterfield' during the 11th-century reign of Edward the Confessor, and historians believe there was also a Norman church. Construction on the present church started in 1234 AD. It was continued and expanded throughout the medieval period, particularly in the 14th century. The church is largely medieval, with Early English, Decorated Gothic and Perpendicular Gothic features built of ashlar. It is laid out in a classic cruciform and comprises a nave, aisles, north and south transepts and the chancel which is surrounded by four guild chapels.

During the Reformation in the 1500s, the church lost much of its medieval decor. It was rebuilt in the 1700s, including of the north transept in 1769, and restored and embellished by Neo-Gothic architect George Gilbert Scott in the 1840s. A new ceiling was installed and new east window inserted with stained glass by William Wailes of Newcastle. A new font was donated by Samuel Johnson of Somersal Hall. After a nine-month closure, the church reopened on 9 May 1843.

In 1810, a peal of 10 bells was installed in the steeple underneath the spire, which could be heard up to four miles away, in a quieter age. In 1817, an inspection concluded that loose and rotting timber inside the spire, and the structure being pushed southward from inner support beams, meant the structure was in imminent danger of collapse, and it was recommended that the entire spire be dismantled for safety. However, it was decided the spire could instead be repaired.

On 11 March 1861, the church spire was struck by lightning, damaging gas lighting pipes in the steeple and igniting a beam next to the wooden roof of the chancel. The fire smouldered for three and a half hours until it was discovered by the sexton on his nightly round to ring the midnight bell.

A further restoration was begun in 1896 by Temple Lushington Moore. Moore designed the High Altar reredos, installed in 1898.

In 1911, it was reported that a "Prentice bell" – an old Angelus bell, used but once a year – was still rung from the Crooked Spire every Shrove Tuesday at a quarter to eleven as a pancake bell.

A further fire erupted on 22 December 1961, this time engulfing the north of the church. A clerk at the town library noticed smoke from the north transept window and raised the alarm, enabling firefighters to save much of the historic church, including the south transept screen from c. 1500, the Norman font and a Jacobean pulpit – but the flames melted the glass in the north window and destroyed the roof, the choir room, and the majority of a rare 1756 John Snetzler pipe organ. In 1963, a replacement organ was installed, a 1905 T.C. Lewis organ sourced from Glasgow City Hall, incorporating what remained of the 18th-century Snetzler with a couple of tonal additions since.

In 1984, to mark the church's 750th anniversary, new stained-glass windows depicting the town's history from the 11th century onward were installed in the south aisle, a gift from the people of Chesterfield. Preservation and restoration work on the older stained glass was carried out from 2007 to 2012.

In 2000, scientists were asked to evaluate the spire's movement which, although not considered a threat to the structure, had apparently accelerated during the previous two decades.

In 2020, the Church was awarded a 'lifeline grant' from the Culture Recovery Fund to help ensure its continued role as a place of worship, and as a tourist attraction for the area, during the COVID-19 pandemic in the United Kingdom.

In August 2022, a man was murdered in the churchyard.

== Crooked spire ==
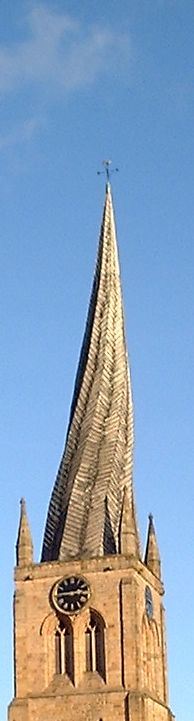
The spire

The spire was added in about 1362; its top is 228 feet (69 m) above the ground. It is both twisted and leaning: the 45-degree twist causes the tip to lean 9 ft 6 in (2.9 m) off centre. The reason is uncertain and still debated: suggestions include lack of skilled workers because of the Black Death, which occurred as much of the church was being built; the use of insufficient cross bracing and 'green timber' – unseasoned timber; and also the 17th-century addition of 33 tons of lead sheeting covering the spire, resting on 14th-century bracing not designed to carry such weight. Another theory is sunlight heating the south side of the tower and causing the lead there to expand at a greater rate than the north side, resulting in an unequal expansion. It is possible that the spire's twist is due to a combination of these factors.

The golden cockerel weather vane atop the spire is inscribed with the names of the past vicars of St Mary's.

The Church's twisted spire gave the town's football club Chesterfield F.C. their nickname, The Spireites. A depiction of the spire also features on the club's crest. It has also been used by local companies to advertise their wares, including Scarsdale Brewery of Chesterfield, who used the spire in their logo, from 1866 until a takeover by Whitbread in 1958.

There are local folk legends as to why the spire is twisted, mostly involving the Devil. In one, a Bolsover blacksmith mis-shod a hoof of the devil, who leapt over the spire in pain and angrily kicked it out of shape. Another states that the devil was resting on the spire when the smell of incense wafting up from inside the church made the devil sneeze, so violently that it caused the spire to warp. A similar story has the devil flying from Nottingham to Sheffield and stopping for rest atop the church, its tail wrapped around the spire, but the ringing of the church bells startled the devil and on leaping away its lashing tail twisted the spire. A simpler version has the devil merely sitting spitefully atop the church weather vane, its bulk causing the twisted spire and inadvertently creating a new tourist attraction. Another myth suggests that the spire, so captivated by the beauty of a bride, leant down for a closer view but became locked in a twisted position, while the more mocking version has the church being so surprised to see a virgin being married, whether groom or bride, that its spire turned to look at the betrothed, becoming stuck – but that should another virgin ever marry in the church, the spire will return to true again.

== Bells ==
The steeple below the spire contains 10 bells, in the key of D. There is also an eleventh 'Shriving' or 'Curfew Bell'. During the early 1800s, Chesterfield was a base for the holding of Napoleonic soldiers on parole; they were allowed a two-mile (three-kilometre) radius to roam on condition they return to barracks at the ringing of the curfew bell. The present set of bells was cast in 1947 by the Whitechapel Bell Foundry in London, the heaviest weighing 1,270 kg (25 cwt). The place in which the bells are now housed once held a builders' windlass, which survives as one of the few examples of a medieval crane in existence, and the only one from a parish church. It is on display at Chesterfield Museum and Art Gallery.

== Clock ==
By 1836 the clock in the tower had failed and in February the ratepayers of Chesterfield at the quarterly meeting of the new and reformed Town Council decided to attempt the establishment of a new clock in the church. It was agreed to defray the expenses of a new clock by an assessment on all property liable to a church-rate of 4½d in the £. The total cost was £352 (equivalent to £34,800 in 2025) including arrangements for the illumination of the west dial, and in October 1836 the clock was completed by Mr Payne of Bloomsbury, London. Each dial was 9 feet (2.7 m) in diameter, the minute hand 4 feet 10 inches (1.47 m) long and the hour hand 2 feet 6 inches (0.76 m) long. The hammer for striking the hours weighed 50 pounds (23 kg). The pendulum ball weighing 150 pounds (68 kg) sat at the end of the 14 feet (4.3 m) pendulum.

In 1929 a new clock by Potts of Leeds was installed at a cost of £488 (equivalent to £26,800 in 2025). New dials of copper painted block with gilt numerals were provided. The clock contained five bells chiming the Cambridge Quarters and striking the hour.

== Tours ==
The spire is open to the public, via organised tours and can be climbed partway up. The views from the top of the tower on a clear day stretch for miles. The spire, which is used as a symbol of Chesterfield, can be seen from the surrounding hills jutting from a sea of mist, on a winter morning.

== Vicars ==
- Martin Lane 1558–1573
- Cuthbert Hutchinson 1573–1609
- Matthew Waddington 1616–?
- William Edwards 1638–?
- John Billingsley 1662–1663
- John Coope 1663–?
- John Lobley ?–1694
- William Blakeman 1694–1699
- Henry Audsley 1699–1705
- John Peck 1705–1707
- William Higgs 1707–1716
- Thomas Hinckesman 1716–1739
- William Wheeler 1739–1765
- John Wood 1765–1781
- George Bossley 1781–1822
- Thomas Hill 1822–1851 (Archdeacon of Derby)
- George Butt 1851–1888
- Hon. Reginald Edmund Adderley 1888–1892
- Hon. Cecil James Littleton 1893–1898
- Egbert Hacking 1899–1905
- Edmond Francis Crosse 1905–1918 (Archdeacon of Chesterfield)
- Francis Longsdon Shaw 1918–1924
- Geoffrey Hare Clayton 1924–1934 (Archdeacon of Chesterfield)
- Talbot Dilworth-Harrison 1934–1963 (Archdeacon of Chesterfield)
- Thomas Wood Ingram Cleasby 1963–1970 (Archdeacon of Chesterfield)
- Thomas Ewart Roberts 1971–1975
- Henry Alexander Puntis 1975–1982
- Brian Hamilton Cooper 1982–1991
- Martyn William Jarrett 1991–1994
- Michael Richard Knight 1994–2013
- Patrick Francis Coleman 2014–present

== Organ ==
The vast majority of the original John Snetzler organ (1756) was destroyed by fire in 1961. It was replaced in 1963 by a redundant T. C. Lewis organ from Glasgow. This is a large four-manual pipe organ with 65 stops. A specification of the organ can be found on the National Pipe Organ Register.

=== List of organists ===
- Thomas Layland 1756–c. 1772
- Samuel Bower c. 1772–1808 joint with Sarah Bower (daughter) from c. 1787
- Sarah Bower (becomes Mrs Dutton in 1807) c. 1787–1847
- Thomas Tallis Trimnell 1847–1874
- Henry John Vaughan 1874−1875 (formerly assistant organist of Gloucester Cathedral)
- Henry Norman Biggin 1875–1910
- J. Frederic Staton 1910–1938 (formerly organist of All Saints' Church, Ashover)
- Reginald Cooper 1938–1947
- Charles Alan Bryars 1947–1970
- Michael Baker 1970–2005
- Ian Brackenbury 2006–2019
- Dr Paul Nash 2019–2022
- Peter Shepherd 2023–

== See also ==
- Grade I listed churches in Derbyshire
- Listed buildings in Chesterfield, Derbyshire

== Gallery ==
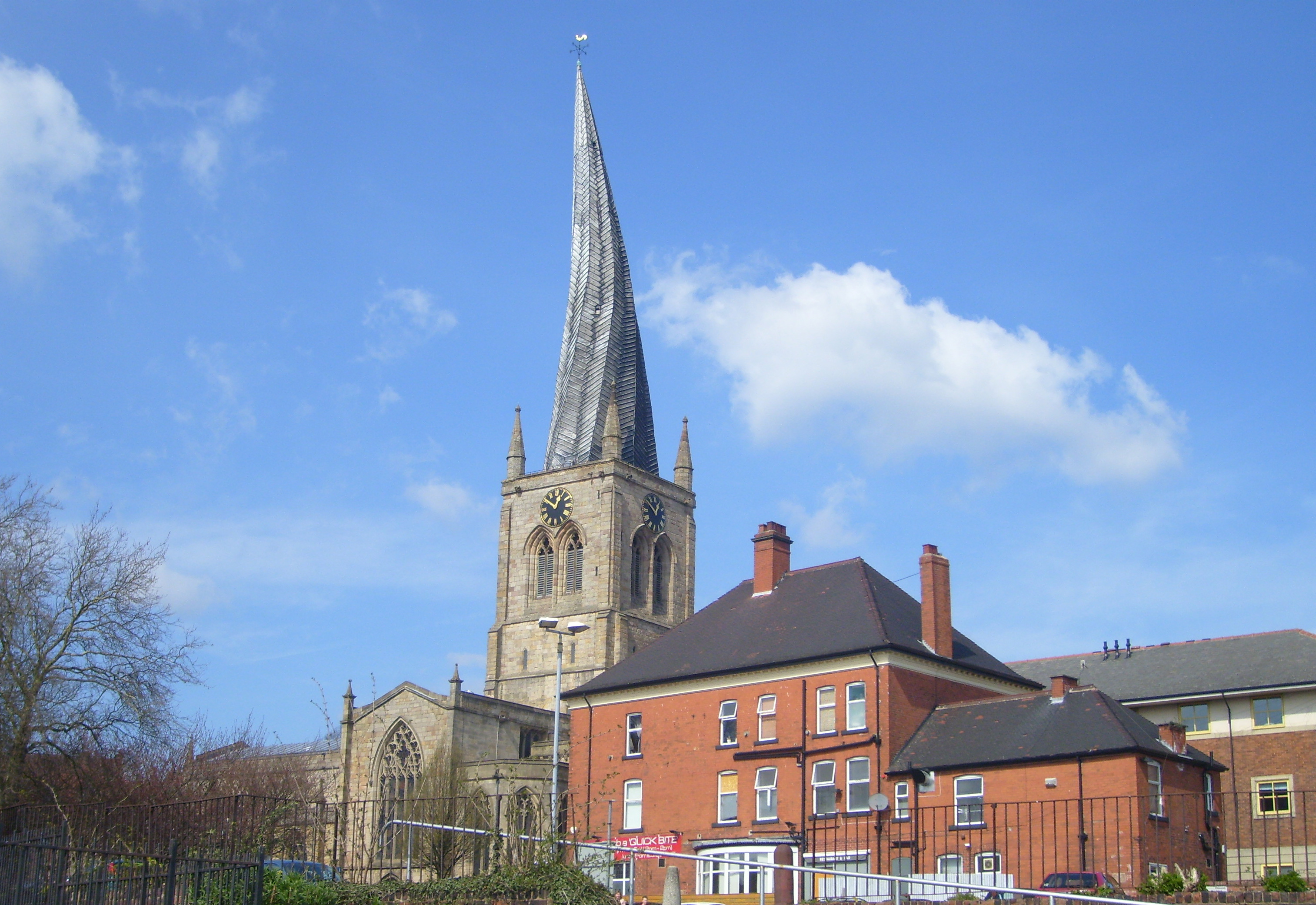
View of the church and spire

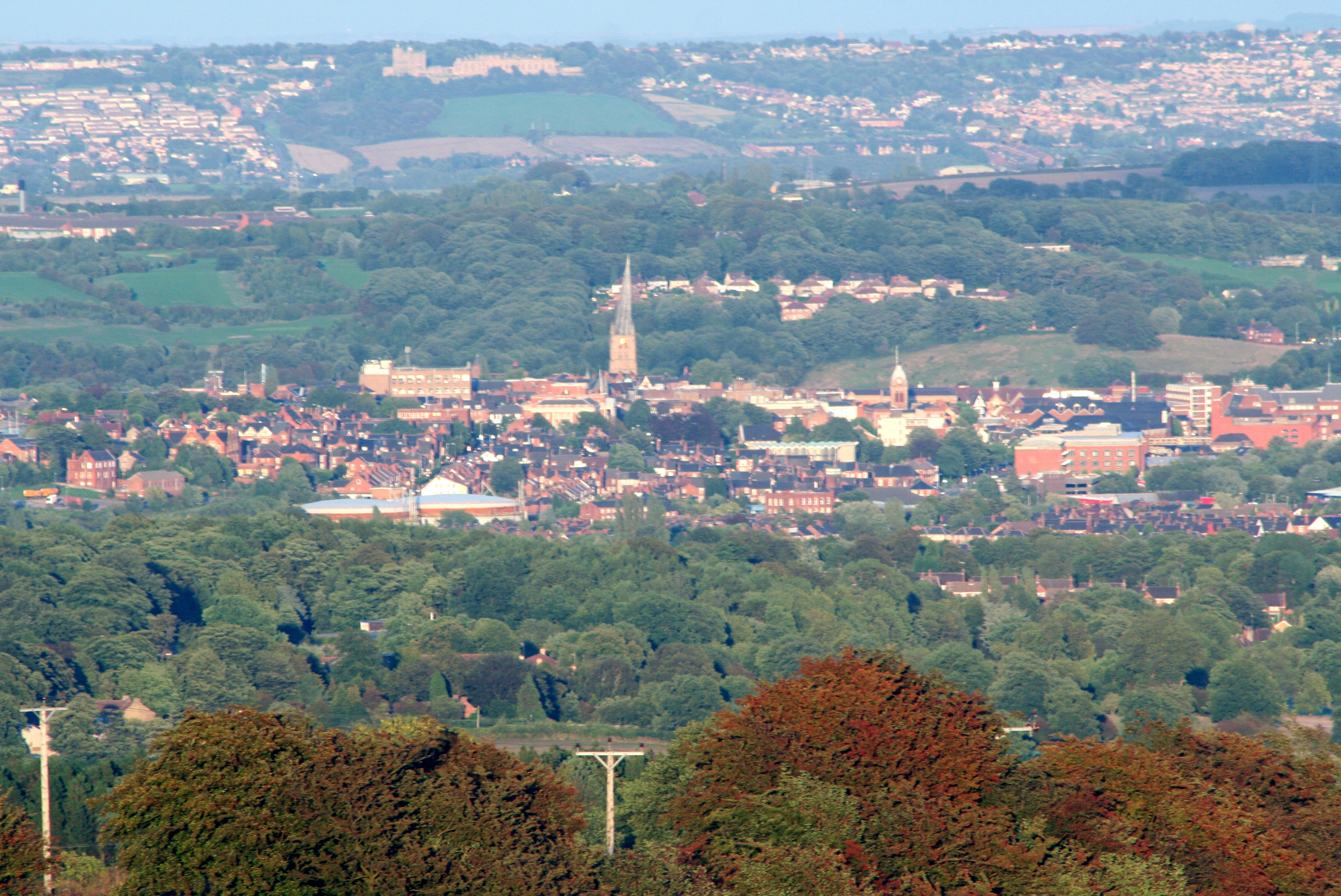
General view of Chesterfield from a distance, including the spire

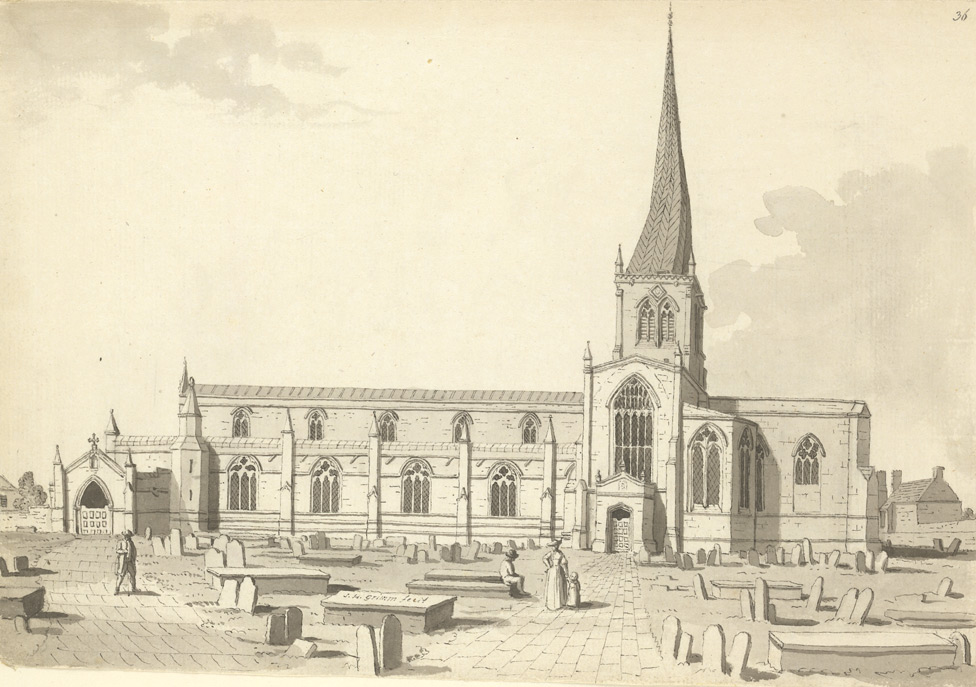
The church in the 18th century as sketched by Samuel Hieronymus Grimm

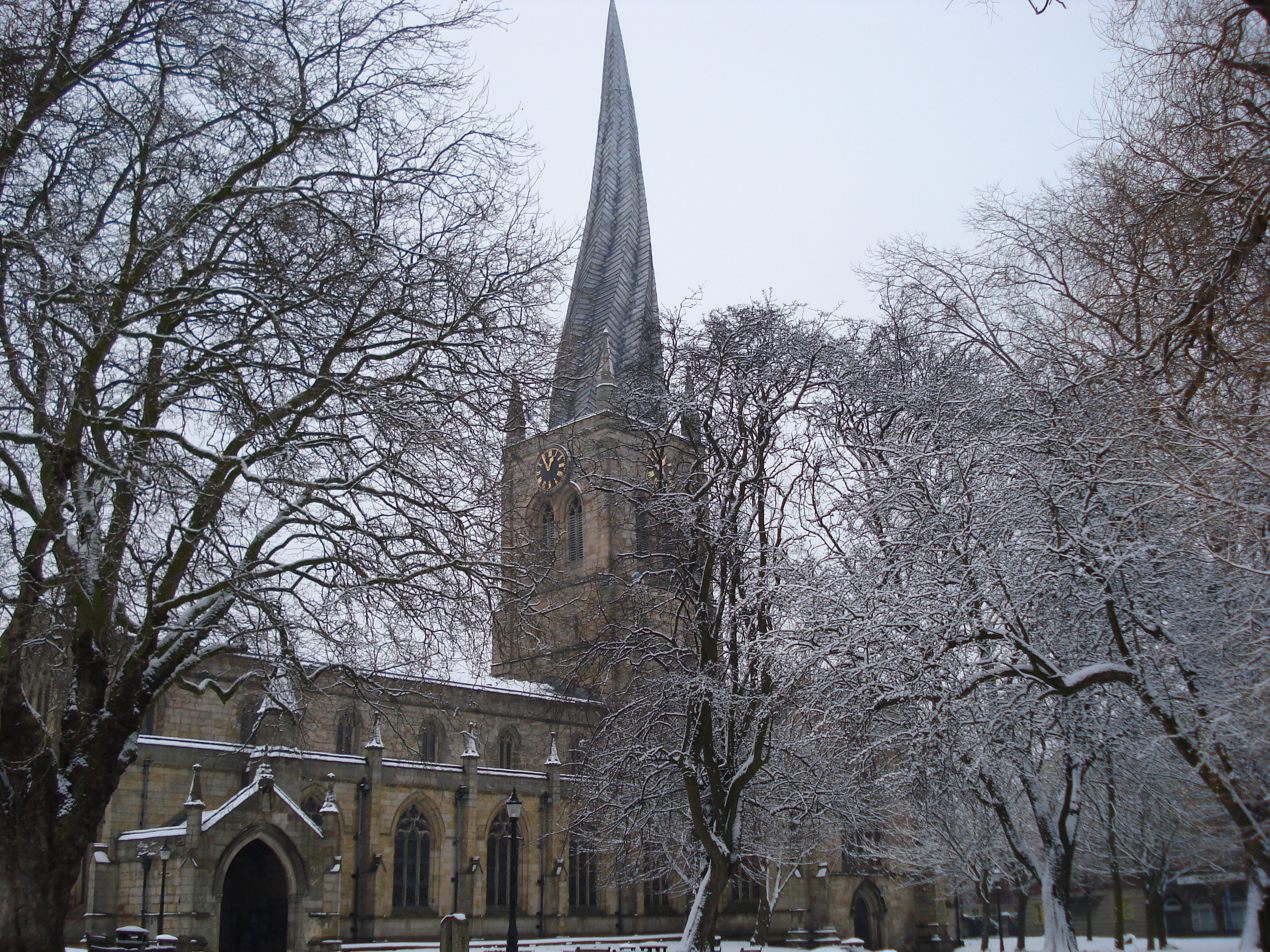
The church in the snow, February 2009

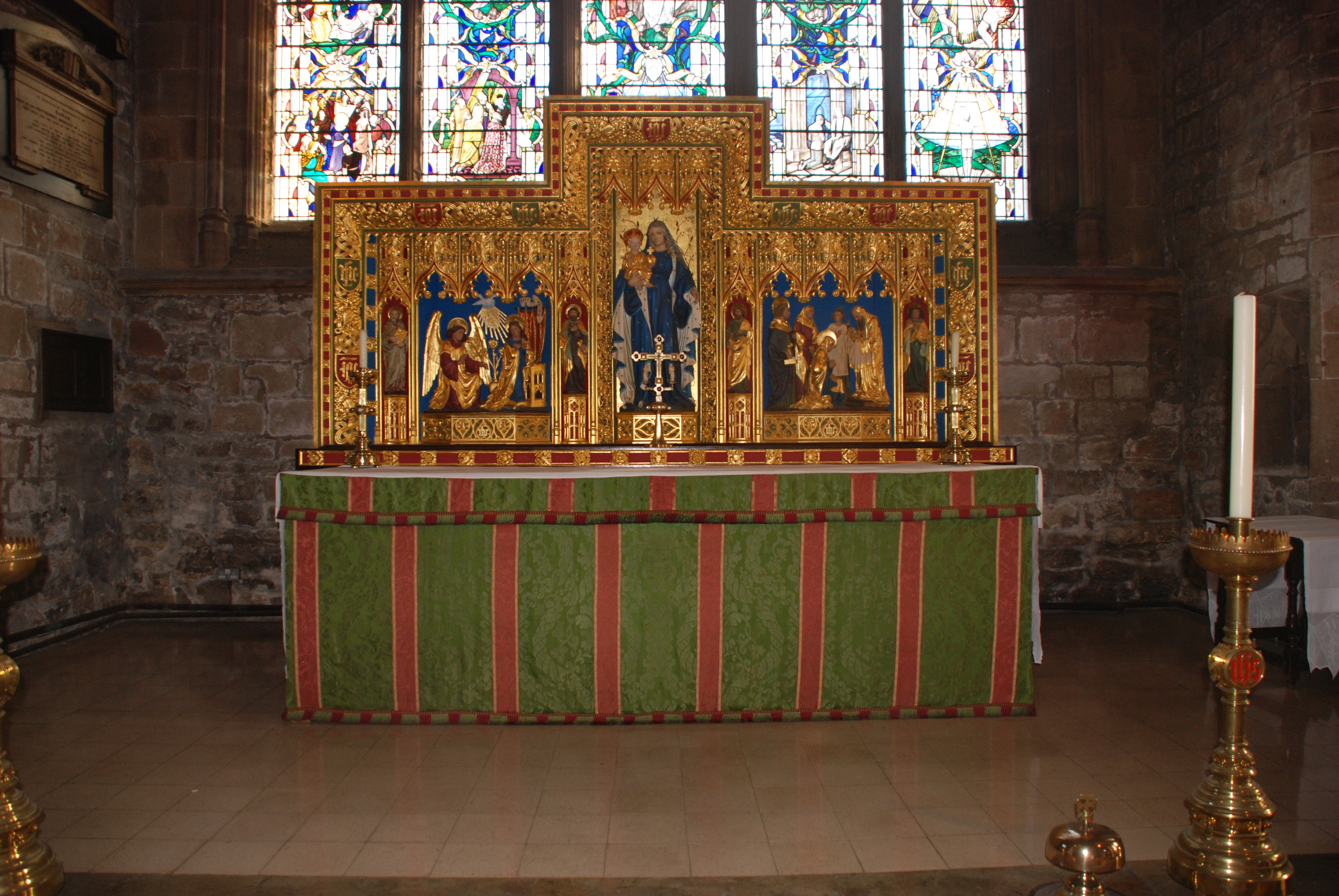
The high altar

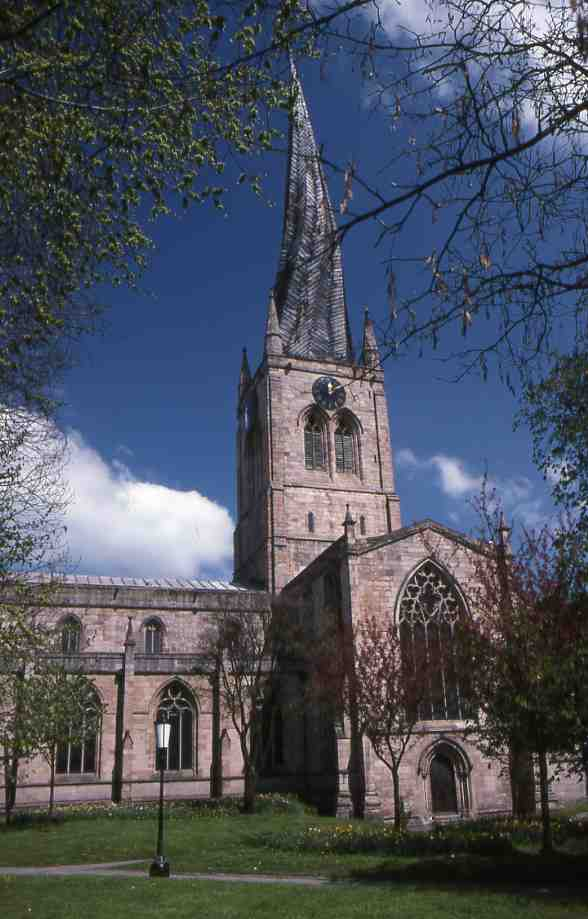
Church of St Mary and All Saints – "The Crooked Spire"
