= Somersall Hall =

Country house in Derbyshire, England

- Location within Derbyshire

General information
- Status: Grade II listed
- Type: Country house
- Location: Near Brampton, Chesterfield, Derbyshire, England
- Coordinates: 53.2257°N 1.4728°W
- Opened: 1763

Listed Building – Grade II
- Official name: Somersall Hall
- Designated: 13 March 1968
- Reference no.: 1088244

Somersall Hall is a small country house near Brampton, Chesterfield, Derbyshire. It is a Grade II listed building.

The Clarke family owned the estate in the 16th century. Godfrey Clarke and his son Sir Gilbert Clarke served as High Sheriff of Derbyshire in 1652 and 1676 respectively. Sir Gilbert bought an additional estate at Chilcote Hall in 1672. His son Godfrey Clarke was Member of Parliament for Derbyshire. He left the estate to his nephew, also Godfrey Clarke, who lived at Chilcote, was High Sheriff in 1740, bought Sutton Scarsdale Hall and built a new house at Somersall.

The new house was built in 1763 on the site of an earlier 17th-century house and incorporates some of the early features. The new work created a three-storey three-bayed house with an east-facing entrance front. In the 19th century a two-storey wing was added to the north of the frontage. A gazebo (possibly originally part of the house) is Grade II* listed and the gatepiers in front of the house are listed at Grade II.

Sutton became the family seat and Somersall was let out as a farmhouse. Godfrey Bagnall Clarke died without issue and his estates passed to his sister and then to her daughter who married Walter Butler, 18th Earl of Ormonde. On the Earls death in 1824 the estates were broken up.

The house was rented for about 30 years in the early to middle part of the 20th century to John and Rosemary Milward and their family, John being a Milward's Needles heir and the surgeon at Chesterfield Hospital. They later bought the ancient Barlow Woodseats Hall in Barlow, Derbyshire and restored it.

== See also ==
- Listed buildings in Chesterfield, Derbyshire
