= East Midlands (strategic authority area) =

Strategic authority area in England

- Strategic authority area
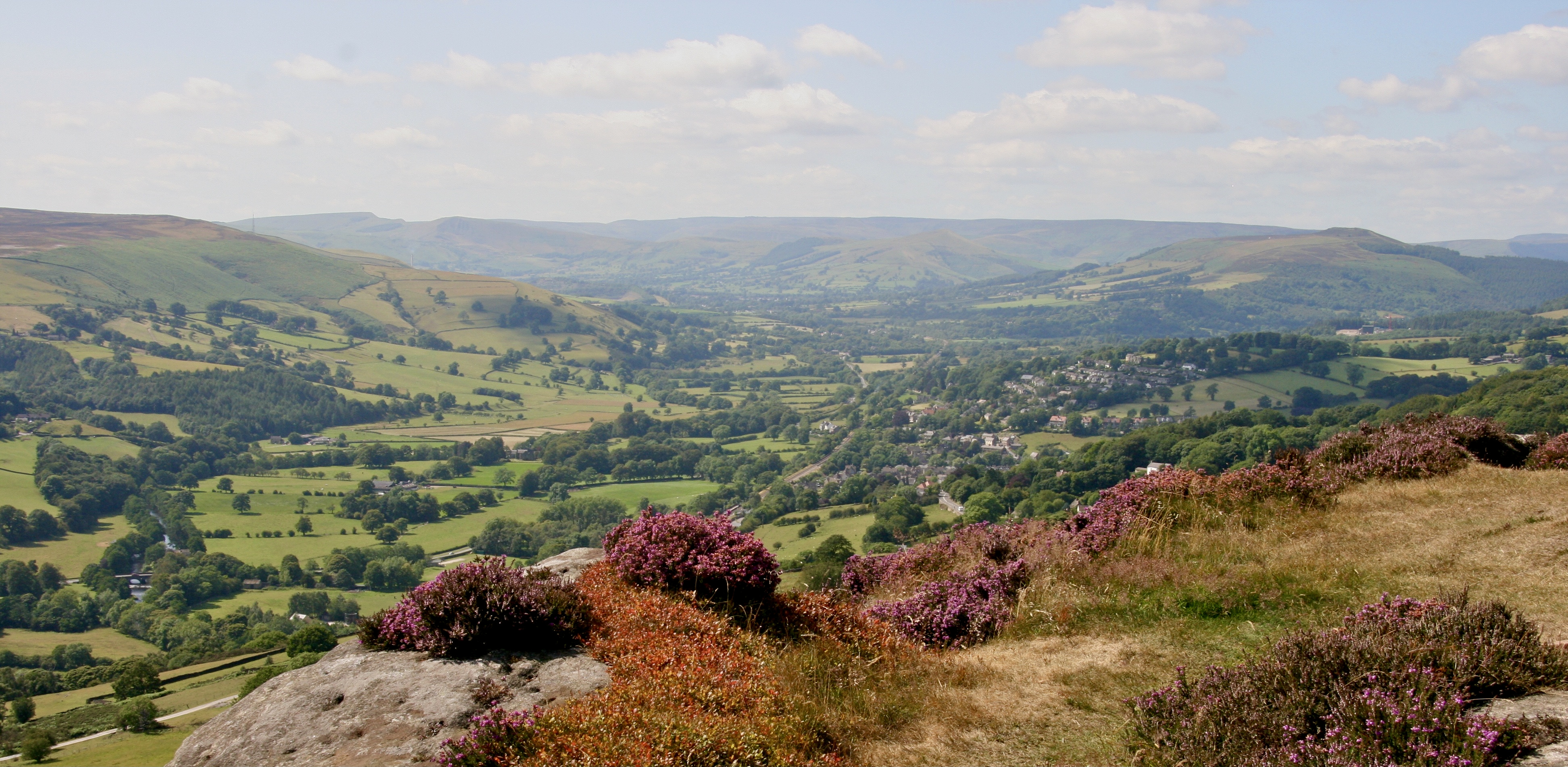
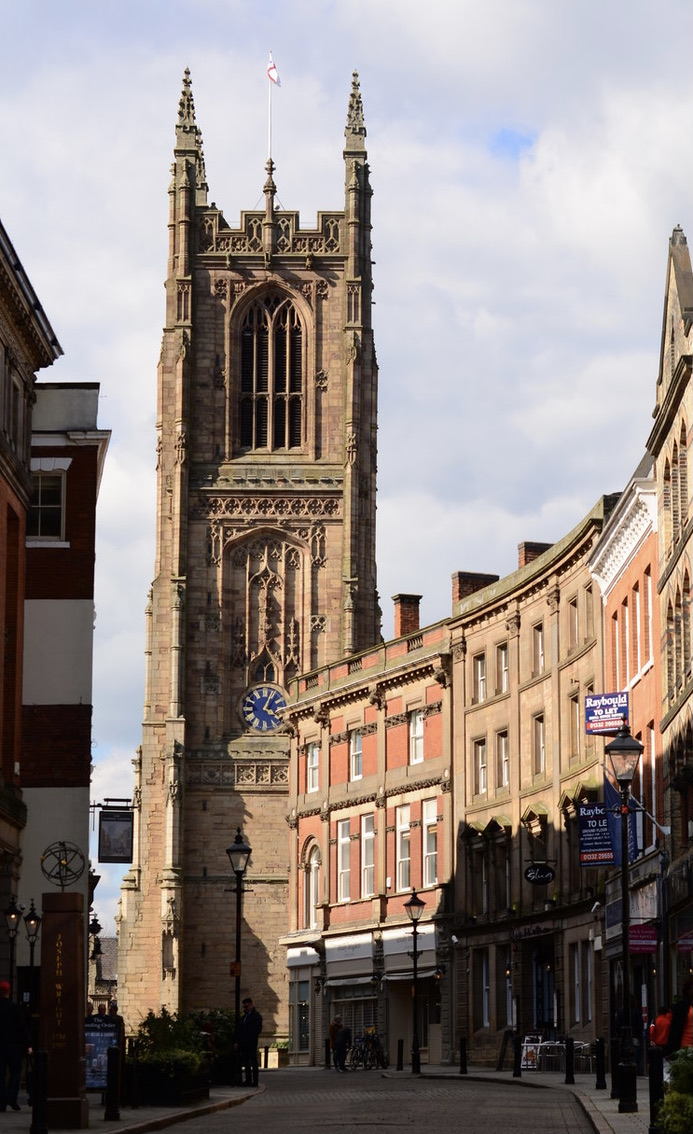
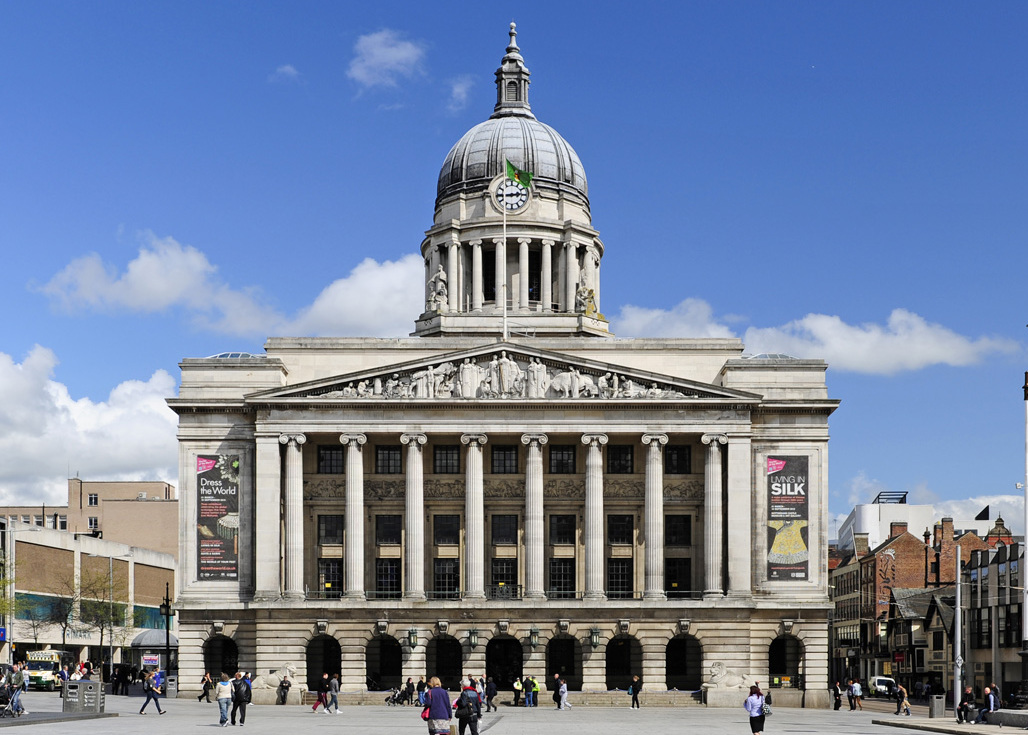
- The Peak District near Hathersage; Derby Cathedral; and the Council House in Nottingham

- East Midlands shown within England
- Coordinates: 53.140°N 1.341°W
- Sovereign state: United Kingdom
- Country: England
- Established: 27 February 2024
- Administrative HQ: Council House, Corporation Street, Derby
- Local authorities: List: Derby; Derbyshire; Nottingham; Nottinghamshire

Government
  - Type: Strategic authority
  - Body: East Midlands Combined County Authority
  - Mayor: Claire Ward (Labour)

Area
  - Land: 1,847 sq mi (4,784 km^{2})

Population (2025)
  - Total: 2,290,652
  - Rank: 5th
  - Density: 1,240/sq mi (479/km^{2})
- Time zone: UTC+0 (GMT)
  - Summer (DST): UTC+1 (BST)
- Postcode areas: DE; LE; NG; S; SK
- Dialling codes: 0114; 01246; 01283; 01298; 01332; 01335; 01433; 01457; 01632; 01636; 01663; 01773; 01777; 01909
- GSS code: E47000013
- Website: www.eastmidlands-cca.gov.uk

East Midlands is a strategic authority area in England. It has four council areas: the non-metropolitan counties of Nottinghamshire and Derbyshire and the unitary authorities of Nottingham and Derby. It had a population of 2,290,652 in 2025. Its largest settlement is Nottingham and administrative HQ is Derby.

The Mayor of the East Midlands and East Midlands Combined County Authority (EMCCA) have a devolution deal which was established on 27 February 2024.

== History ==
The Levelling-up and Regeneration Act 2023 provided the basis of the creation of combined county authorities, a form of strategic authority.

A North Midlands combined authority was proposed by Derbyshire and Nottinghamshire in 2016. South Derbyshire District Council, High Peak Borough Council, Amber Valley Borough Council and Erewash Borough Council all voted to reject the proposal, and Chesterfield Borough Council decided to join the South Yorkshire Combined Authority instead. In July 2016, it was reported that the North Midlands devolution deal had collapsed. There has been support from several council leaders for an East Midlands combined authority (in response to the West Midlands) with discussions to follow on whether a directly elected mayor would be implemented, and on the future of the existing boroughs. The scope of the devolution deal has involved the counties of Derbyshire, Leicestershire, Lincolnshire and Nottinghamshire, as well as their cities. The leaders of seven Leicestershire councils wrote in 2020 to the Secretary of State for Housing, Communities and Local Government, who gave support.

In 2022, leaders of Nottinghamshire and Derbyshire county councils, and Nottingham and Derby city councils, stated that discussions had taken place for a deal, and that they were open to a mayoral deal. A proposal was made by Government and signed by the four councils on 30 August 2022, to form the first Mayoral Combined County Authority.

The deal was criticised for side-lining neighbouring Leicestershire and some politicians in Leicestershire expressed regret at being left out of the devolution deal, which had been opposed by Leicester City Council. The Centre for Cities said that even combining Derbyshire and Nottinghamshire was "a mistake" as "they are two different counties with distinct local economic needs" and "There is very little commuting between Nottinghamshire and Derbyshire". This is despite the same organisation including the Derbyshire district of Erewash in their definition of Nottingham.

The combined authority was formally established by the East Midlands Combined County Authority Regulations 2024 which were made on 27 February 2024.

The Mayor of East Midlands became a member of the Mayoral Council for England and the Council of the Nations and Regions when those bodies were established in October 2024.

In October 2026, the authority established Visit East Midlands, combining the various tourism bodies in the area, including "Visit Nottingham", "Visit Derby" and "Visit Derbyshire and the Peak District".

== Governance ==
=== Combined county authority ===
As of June 2025, the board of the East Midlands Combined County Authority comprises:

Name	Membership	Position within nominating authority	Nominating authority
Claire Ward	Constituent	Mayor of the East Midlands	Direct election
Alan Graves	Constituent	Leader of the Council	Derbyshire County Council
Nadine Peatfield	Constituent	Leader of the Council	Derby City Council
Mick Barton	Constituent	Leader of the Council	Nottinghamshire County Council
Neghat Khan	Constituent	Leader of the Council	Nottingham City Council
Rob Reaney	Constituent	Deputy Leader of the Council	Derbyshire County Council
Paul Hezelgrave	Constituent	Deputy Leader of the Council	Derby City Council
John Doddy	Constituent	Deputy Leader of the Council	Nottinghamshire County Council
Ethan Radford	Constituent	Deputy Leader of the Council	Nottingham City Council
Tricia Gilby	Non-constituent		D2 Strategic Leadership Board
Anthony McKeown	Non-constituent		D2 Strategic Leadership Board
Julie Leigh	Non-constituent		N2 Economic Prosperity Committee
Paul Peacock	Non-constituent		N2 Economic Prosperity Committee

=== Mayor of the East Midlands ===
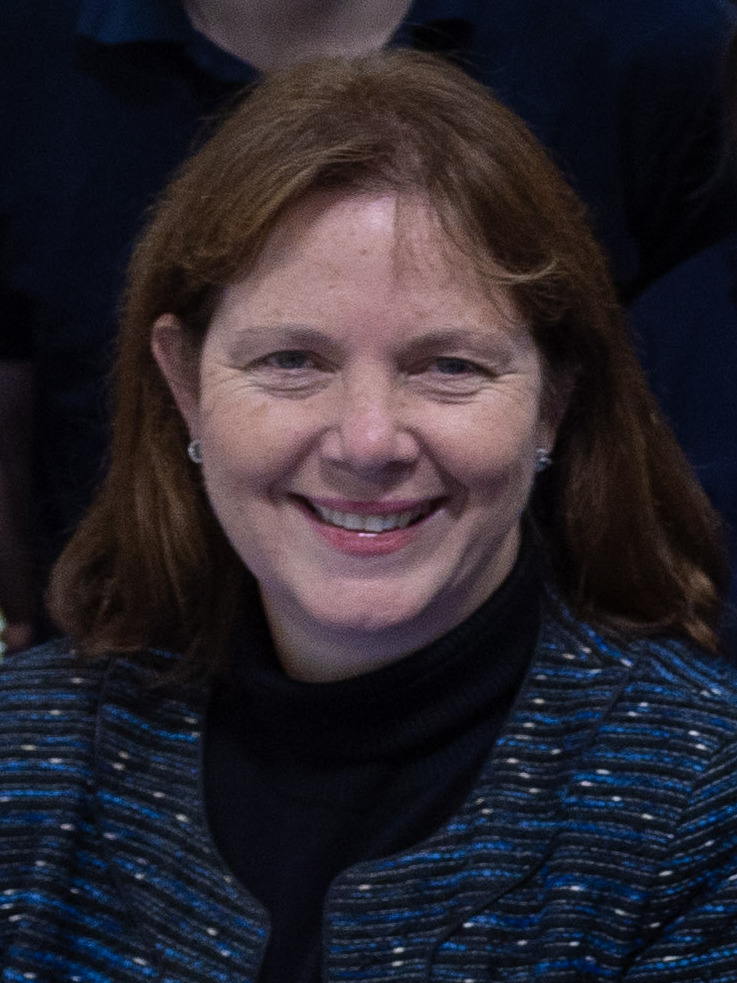
Mayor of the East Midlands Claire Ward (Labour)

in 2016 the Cities and Local Government Devolution Act 2016 provided the provisions for combined authorities to establish directly elected mayors to lead their respective regions.

The local authorities in Derbyshire and Nottinghamshire voted to proceed with devolution plans, including the establishment of a directly elected mayor of the East Midlands, in March 2023. The first mayor, Claire Ward, was elected on 2 May 2024 in the 2024 East Midlands mayoral election.

=== Members of Parliament ===
Constituency	Local authority	Member of Parliament	Political party
Amber Valley	Derbyshire	Linsey Farnsworth	Labour Party
Ashfield	Nottinghamshire	Lee Anderson	Reform UK
Bassetlaw	Nottinghamshire	Jo White	Labour Party
Broxtowe	Nottinghamshire	Juliet Campbell	Labour Party
Bolsover	Derbyshire	Natalie Fleet	Labour Party
Chesterfield	Derbyshire	Toby Perkins	Labour Party
Derby North	Derby	Catherine Atkinson	Labour Party
Derby South	Derby	Baggy Shanker	Labour Party
Derbyshire Dales	Derbyshire	John Whitby	Labour Party
Erewash	Derbyshire	Adam Thompson	Labour Party
Gedling	Nottinghamshire	Michael Payne	Labour Party
High Peak	Derbyshire	Jon Pearce	Labour Party
Mansfield	Nottinghamshire	Steve Yemm	Labour Party
Mid Derbyshire	Derby, Derbyshire	Jonathan Davies	Labour Party
Newark	Nottinghamshire	Robert Jenrick	Reform UK
North East Derbyshire	Derbyshire	Louise Sandher-Jones	Labour Party
Nottingham East	Nottingham	Nadia Whittome	Labour Party
Nottingham North and Kimberley	Nottingham, Nottinghamshire	Alex Norris	Labour Party
Nottingham South	Nottingham	Lilian Greenwood	Labour Party
Rushcliffe	Nottinghamshire	James Naish	Labour Party
Sherwood Forest	Nottinghamshire	Michelle Welsh	Labour Party
South Derbyshire	Derbyshire	Samantha Niblett	Labour Party

== Demography ==
=== Population ===
The area had a population of 2,290,652 in 2025.

== See also ==
- 2024 East Midlands mayoral election
