= John Hess =

John Hess may refer to:

- John Hess (journalist) (born 1955), British journalist for BBC East Midlands
- John L. Hess (1917–2005), American journalist
- John George Hess (1838–1915), Ontario businessman and political figure
- John B. Hess (born 1954), chairman and CEO of Hess Corporation
- John R. Hess, American physician

== See also ==
- Jon Hess (disambiguation)
