= Subdivisions of England =

Administrative division or non-administrative ceremonial area of England

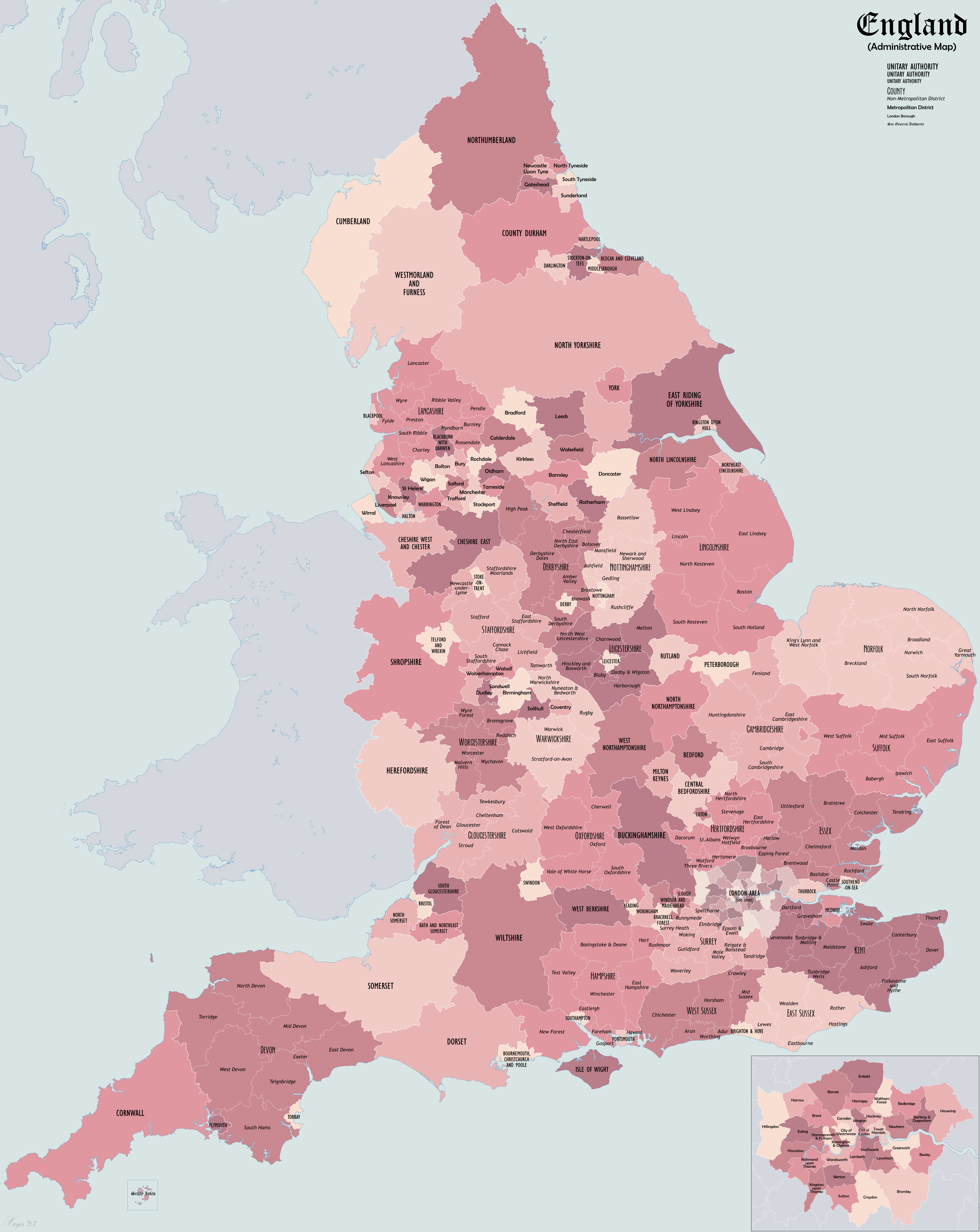
- Subdivisions of England (as of 1 April 2023) that have a principal local authority: unitary authorities, and two-tier non-metropolitan counties and their non-metropolitan districts
- Location: England
Subdivisions
- - Type: Number
  - Strategic authority area: 20
  - Unitary authority district: 130
  - Two-tier non-metropolitan county: 21
  - Two-tier non-metropolitan district: 164
  - Civil parish: 10,449
  - Sui generis: 2

The subdivisions of England constitute a hierarchy of administrative divisions and other non-administrative areas.

For local government, the country is divided into strategic authority areas, counties, districts and parishes. In some areas, counties and districts form a two-tier administrative structure, while in others they are combined under a unitary authority. Strategic authorities and parishes cover only part of England. The current system for local government is the result of incremental reform based on legislation that was implemented in 1965 and 1974. Exceptionally, the City of London and the Isles of Scilly are sui generis subdivisions that predate these reforms.

England is also divided into nine regions, now used primarily for statistical purposes. It is divided into 48 ceremonial counties, that are appointed a Lord-lieutenant, the representative of the monarch in those area.

metropolitan county two-tier non-metropolitan county unitary authority (non-metropolitan county and district) non-metropolitan county with multiple unitary authorities (which are not counties) Greater London sui generis areas (City of London and Isles of Scilly) regional boundary ceremonial county boundary non-metropolitan county boundary

== History ==
The 1974 reform of local government established a two-tier structure of counties and districts in England outside Greater London. In non-metropolitan counties it was the county council that provided the majority of services, including education and social services while the district-tier councils have a more limited role. Since 1996 the two-tier areas have been replaced with unitary authorities. New local administrative subdivisions in England have generally evolved through path dependence, with new units often created by merging smaller, lower-tier areas.

=== Counties ===
Counties have been a subdivision of England since they were established in the period between the 7th and 11th centuries. Counties have served an administrative role since then; Parr (2020) describes them as the 'most noticeable example' of path dependence in England's local government geography. Between 1889 and 1974, an area with a county council was termed an administrative county.

=== County boroughs ===
County boroughs were wholly independent urban centres that existed between 1888 and 1974. County boroughs were independent of the administrative county.

=== Districts ===
The districts of England originate in the 1834 Poor Law reforms, which amalgamated multiple parishes to form Poor Law unions. These areas were later used as the basis for census registration districts and sanitary districts. 1984 reforms to sub-county government created urban districts and rural districts as a standard lower-tier layer of local government beneath administrative counties.

The 1970s local government reforms replaced the administrative counties and county boroughs with non-metropolitan counties and metropolitan counties, covering the whole of England outside of London. The lower tier of government below the non-metropolitan counties were non-metropolitan districts.

Since 1992, many local authorities have been made unitary authorities, or new unitary authorities have been established to replace the previous two-tier local authorities in a particular area. This has led to either the local government district or county being, in effect, abolished.

== Sub-regional and local government areas ==
=== Strategic authority areas ===
The primary administrative bodies above the upper-tier or unitary local authority are the Greater London Authority, the combined authorities and the combined county authorities. They are collectively known as strategic authorities. They do not cover all of England. Each strategic authority covers an area made up of the territory of a group of constituent councils. The term "strategic authority" was applied retrospectively. The first strategic authority was the Greater London Authority, established in 2000, and the second was the Greater Manchester Combined Authority, established in 2010, covering Greater Manchester. They have devolved powers from central government that are not available to local councils. Some strategic authority areas have the same borders as metropolitan counties which formerly had county councils, such as Greater Manchester. In others areas a metropolitan county has been combined with other local government areas, such as the Liverpool City Region which consists of Merseyside and the Borough of Halton. (Note: In metropolitan counties the borough councils are required to form integrated transport authorities under the Local Government Act 1985 (as amended). Where unitary authorities are added to the combined authority area, they continue to be transport authorities.)

=== Two-tier areas ===
The Local Government Act 1972 divided English local government into a two system of metropolitan and non-metropolitan counties and districts, with local council functions split between the two levels. Over time, the two-tier system has been replaced by a unitary system in most of England; the metropolitan counties ceased to be a unit of government in 1986.

=== Unitary authority areas ===
In most of England, council functions are carried out by a single unitary authority, as the two-tier system of local government introduced in 1974 has been abolished over time. They are categorised differently based on the method in which they were created, but all have the powers previously held separately by county councils and district councils. 56 unitary authority areas are legally simultaneously non-metropolitan counties and non-metropolitan districts, reflecting that they perform the functions of both. In Berkshire, the districts became unitary authorities in 1998 but the non-metropolitan county remained in legal existence (without a county council) to keep the title of royal county.

=== London boroughs and metropolitan boroughs ===
The Greater London administrative area was created in 1965 with 32 boroughs, and the City of London. In 1986, the Greater London Council and the metropolitan county councils were abolished, leading the London boroughs and metropolitan boroughs to become unitary. Unlike unitary authorities created later, they are not areas for public transport authorities, although they are highways authority areas.

=== Sui generis ===
The Isles of Scilly are governed by a sui generis local authority called the Council of the Isles of Scilly. The authority was established in 1890 as the Isles of Scilly Rural District Council. It was renamed but otherwise unreformed by the changes in local government that occurred in 1974 in the rest of England outside Greater London. Although effectively a unitary authority, for example it is an education authority, the Isles of Scilly are part of the Cornwall ceremonial county and combine with Cornwall Council for services such as health and economic development.

The ancient City of London is the only part of Greater London not within a London borough; it is governed by the City of London Corporation, a sui generis authority unlike any other in England that has largely avoided any of the reforms of local government in the 19th and 20th centuries.

=== Civil parishes ===
The civil parish is the most local unit of government in England. A parish is governed by a parish council or parish meeting, which exercises a limited number of functions that would otherwise be delivered by the local authority. There is one civil parish in Greater London (Queen's Park, in the City of Westminster), and not all of the rest of England is parished. The number of parishes and total area parished is growing.

== Other divisions ==
=== Regions ===
The largest subnational divisions are the nine regions. All of England is divided into regions that are each made up of a number of local government areas. These "government office regions" were created in 1994. They vary greatly in their areas covered, populations and contributions to the national economy. All have the same status, except London which has substantive devolved powers. They were the regions used for the European Social Fund and European Regional Development Fund. The governance of the regions was regional assemblies until 1 April 2010 when they were replaced by local authority leaders' boards. The regional development agencies were abolished in 2012. These regions were also used for European Parliament constituencies and the Boundary Commission considered them when drawing up United Kingdom Parliament constituencies. These regions continue to be used for regional employers organisations. Prior to the government office regions established in 1994, England was divided into eight economic planning regions. These originated in the civil defence regions established during the Second World War.

Regions since 1994
Ceremonial counties since 1998

=== Ceremonial counties ===
England is wholly divided into 48 ceremonial counties. They are the areas used for appointing lords-lieutenant who are the representatives of the Crown in those areas. Ceremonial county is a modern term. Between 1974 and 1997 no special terminology was required because the areas for lieutenancy were the same as the areas used for local government. They became defined separately due to reform of local government, and are now defined in reference to local government areas. The ceremonial counties have been static since they were defined in 1997. As the local government structure of England has become more complex and fragmented, the ceremonial counties provide a more stable and common frame of reference. (Note: For example this government list of primary destination organised by ceremonial counties.)

=== Metropolitan counties ===
Metropolitan counties were established in 1974, covering large conurbations of cities outside Greater London. Each had a county council, responsible for strategic planning, public transport, fire, civil defence, police and waste management. These services continue to be provided in these counties by joint boards and arrangements.

=== Spatial development strategy areas ===
Areas for producing spatial development strategies are being introduced in 2026. Unlike strategic authorities, they will cover all of England. The areas for strategies will include those of strategic authorities where they exist. Outside of these areas strategic planning boards covering multiple authorities will be created to make the plan, or the government can direct an existing local authority to produce one.

== List of subdivisions ==
Region	Ceremonial county	Local government areas		
Region	Ceremonial county	Strategic authority areas (Note: All except the Greater London Authority are combined authorities and combined county authorities)	Principal authority areas	
Region	Ceremonial county	Strategic authority areas	Single-tier district (Note: Districts may also hold borough and/or city status)	Two-tier counties and districts (Note: Districts may also hold borough and/or city status)
East of England	Essex	—N/a	1. Thurrock	—N/a
East of England	Essex	—N/a	2. Southend-on-Sea	—N/a
East of England	Essex	—N/a	—N/a	3. Essex; a) Harlow, b) Epping Forest, c) Brentwood, d) Basildon, e) Castle Point, f) Rochford, g) Maldon, h) Chelmsford, i) Uttlesford, j) Braintree, k) Colchester, l) Tendring
East of England	Hertfordshire	—N/a	—N/a	4. Hertfordshire; a) Three Rivers, b) Watford, c) Hertsmere, d) Welwyn Hatfield, e) Broxbourne, f) East Hertfordshire, g) Stevenage, h) North Hertfordshire, i) St Albans, j) Dacorum
East of England	Bedfordshire	—N/a	5. Luton	—N/a
East of England	Bedfordshire	—N/a	6. Bedford	—N/a
East of England	Bedfordshire	—N/a	7. Central Bedfordshire	—N/a
East of England	Cambridgeshire	Cambridgeshire and Peterborough	—N/a	8. Cambridgeshire; a) Cambridge, b) South Cambridgeshire, c) Huntingdonshire, d) Fenland, e) East Cambridgeshire
East of England	Cambridgeshire	Cambridgeshire and Peterborough	9. Peterborough	—N/a
East of England	Norfolk	—N/a	—N/a	10. Norfolk; a) Norwich, b) South Norfolk, c) Great Yarmouth, d) Broadland, e) North Norfolk, f) Breckland, g) King's Lynn and West Norfolk
East of England	Suffolk	—N/a	—N/a	11. Suffolk; a) Ipswich, b) East Suffolk, c) Babergh, d) Mid Suffolk, e) West Suffolk
London	1. Greater London	Greater London	a) City of Westminster, b) Kensington and Chelsea, c) Hammersmith and Fulham, d) Wandsworth, e) Lambeth, f) Southwark, g) Tower Hamlets, h) Hackney, i) Islington, j) Camden, k) Brent, l) Ealing, m) Hounslow, n) Richmond, o) Kingston upon Thames, p) Merton, q) Sutton, r) Croydon, s) Bromley, t) Lewisham, u) Greenwich, v) Bexley, w) Havering, x) Barking and Dagenham, y) Redbridge, z) Newham, aa) Waltham Forest, ab) Haringey, ac) Enfield, ad) Barnet, ae) Harrow, af) Hillingdon	—N/a
London	City of London	Greater London	2. City of London	—N/a
North East	Northumberland	North East	1. Northumberland	—N/a
North East	2. Tyne and Wear (Note: Also a metropolitan county (no county council))	North East	a) Newcastle upon Tyne, b) Gateshead, c) North Tyneside, d) South Tyneside, e) Sunderland	—N/a
North East	Durham	North East	3. County Durham	—N/a
North East	Durham	Tees Valley	4. Darlington	—N/a
North East	Durham	Tees Valley	5. Hartlepool	—N/a
North East	Durham	Tees Valley	6. Stockton-on-Tees	—N/a
North East	North Yorkshire	Tees Valley	6. Stockton-on-Tees	
North East	North Yorkshire	Tees Valley	7. Redcar and Cleveland	—N/a
North East	North Yorkshire	Tees Valley	8. Middlesbrough	—N/a
Yorkshire and the Humber	North Yorkshire	York and North Yorkshire	3. North Yorkshire	—N/a
Yorkshire and the Humber	North Yorkshire	York and North Yorkshire	4. York	—N/a
Yorkshire and the Humber	1. South Yorkshire		a) Sheffield, b) Rotherham, c) Barnsley, d) Doncaster	—N/a
Yorkshire and the Humber	2. West Yorkshire		a) Wakefield, b) Kirklees, c) Calderdale, d) Bradford, e) Leeds	—N/a
Yorkshire and the Humber	East Riding of Yorkshire	Hull and East Yorkshire	5. East Riding of Yorkshire	—N/a
Yorkshire and the Humber	East Riding of Yorkshire	Hull and East Yorkshire	6. Kingston upon Hull	—N/a
Yorkshire and the Humber	Lincolnshire	Greater Lincolnshire	7. North Lincolnshire	—N/a
Yorkshire and the Humber	Lincolnshire	Greater Lincolnshire	8. North East Lincolnshire	—N/a
East Midlands	Lincolnshire	Greater Lincolnshire	—N/a	5. Lincolnshire; a) Lincoln, b) North Kesteven, c) South Kesteven, d) South Holland, e) Boston, f) East Lindsey, g) West Lindsey
East Midlands	Derbyshire	East Midlands	—N/a	1. Derbyshire; a) High Peak, b) Derbyshire Dales, c) South Derbyshire, d) Erewash, e) Amber Valley, f) North East Derbyshire, g) Chesterfield, h) Bolsover
East Midlands	Derbyshire	East Midlands	2. Derby	—N/a
East Midlands	Nottinghamshire	East Midlands	—N/a	3. Nottinghamshire; a) Rushcliffe, b) Broxtowe, c) Ashfield, d) Gedling, e) Newark and Sherwood, f) Mansfield, g) Bassetlaw
East Midlands	Nottinghamshire	East Midlands	4. Nottingham	—N/a
East Midlands	Leicestershire	—N/a	—N/a	6. Leicestershire; a) Charnwood, b) Melton, c) Harborough, d) Oadby and Wigston, e) Blaby, f) Hinckley and Bosworth, g) North West Leicestershire
East Midlands	Leicestershire	—N/a	7. Leicester	—N/a
East Midlands	Rutland	—N/a	8. Rutland	—N/a
East Midlands	Northamptonshire	—N/a	9. West Northamptonshire	—N/a
East Midlands	Northamptonshire	—N/a	10. North Northamptonshire	—N/a
North West
North West	Cumbria		1. Cumberland	—N/a
North West	Cumbria		2. Westmorland and Furness	—N/a
North West	Lancashire		—N/a	3. Lancashire; a) West Lancashire, b) Chorley, c) South Ribble, d) Fylde, e) Preston, f) Wyre, g) Lancaster, h) Ribble Valley, i) Pendle, j) Burnley, k) Rossendale, l) Hyndburn
North West	Lancashire		4. Blackpool	—N/a
North West	Lancashire		5. Blackburn with Darwen	—N/a
North West	6. Greater Manchester		a) Bolton, b) Bury, c) Manchester, d) Oldham, e) Rochdale, f) Salford, g) Stockport, h) Tameside, i) Trafford, j) Wigan	—N/a
North West	7. Merseyside	Liverpool City Region	a) Knowsley, b) Liverpool, c) St. Helens, d) Sefton, e) Wirral	—N/a
North West	Cheshire	Liverpool City Region	8. Halton	—N/a
North West	Cheshire	Cheshire and Warrington	9. Warrington	—N/a
North West	Cheshire	Cheshire and Warrington	10. Cheshire West and Chester	—N/a
North West	Cheshire	Cheshire and Warrington	11. Cheshire East	—N/a
South East	1. Berkshire (Note: Also a royal county and non-metropolitan county (no county council))	—N/a	a) West Berkshire, b) Reading, c) Wokingham, d) Bracknell Forest, e) Windsor and Maidenhead, f) Slough	—N/a
South East	Buckinghamshire	—N/a	2. Buckinghamshire	—N/a
South East	Buckinghamshire	—N/a	3. Milton Keynes	—N/a
South East	East Sussex	Sussex and Brighton	—N/a	4. East Sussex; a) Hastings, b) Rother, c) Wealden, d) Eastbourne, e) Lewes
South East	East Sussex	Sussex and Brighton	5. Brighton and Hove	—N/a
South East	West Sussex	Sussex and Brighton	—N/a	10. West Sussex; a) Worthing, b) Arun, c) Chichester, d) Horsham, e) Crawley, f) Mid Sussex, g) Adur
South East	Kent	—N/a	—N/a	6. Kent; a) Dartford, b) Gravesham, c) Sevenoaks, d) Tonbridge and Malling, e) Tunbridge Wells, f) Maidstone, g) Swale, h) Ashford, i) Folkestone and Hythe, j) Canterbury, k) Dover, l) Thanet
South East	Kent	—N/a	7. Medway	—N/a
South East	Oxfordshire	—N/a	—N/a	8. Oxfordshire; a) Oxford, b) Cherwell, c) South Oxfordshire, d) Vale of White Horse, e) West Oxfordshire
South East	Surrey	—N/a	—N/a	9. Surrey; a) Spelthorne, b) Runnymede, c) Surrey Heath, d) Woking, e) Elmbridge, f) Guildford, g) Waverley, h) Mole Valley, i) Epsom and Ewell, j) Reigate and Banstead, k) Tandridge
South East	Hampshire	Hampshire and the Solent	—N/a	11. Hampshire; a) Fareham, b) Gosport, c) Winchester, d) Havant, e) East Hampshire, f) Hart, g) Rushmoor, h) Basingstoke and Deane, i) Test Valley, j) Eastleigh, k) New Forest
South East	Hampshire	Hampshire and the Solent	12. Southampton	—N/a
South East	Hampshire	Hampshire and the Solent	13. Portsmouth	—N/a
South East	Isle of Wight	Hampshire and the Solent	14. Isle of Wight	—N/a
South West	Dorset	—N/a	1. Bournemouth, Christchurch and Poole	—N/a
South West	Dorset	—N/a	2. Dorset	—N/a
South West	Somerset	—N/a	3. North Somerset	—N/a
South West	Somerset	—N/a	4. Somerset	—N/a
South West	Somerset	West of England	5. Bath and North East Somerset	—N/a
South West	Bristol	West of England	6. Bristol	—N/a
South West	Gloucestershire	West of England	7. South Gloucestershire	—N/a
South West	Gloucestershire	—N/a	—N/a	8. Gloucestershire; a) Gloucester, b) Tewkesbury, c) Cheltenham, d) Cotswold, e) Stroud, f) Forest of Dean
South West	Wiltshire	—N/a	9. Swindon	—N/a
South West	Wiltshire	—N/a	10. Wiltshire	—N/a
South West	Devon	Devon and Torbay	—N/a	11. Devon; a) Exeter, b) East Devon, c) Mid Devon, d) North Devon, e) Torridge, f) West Devon, g) South Hams, h) Teignbridge
South West	Devon	Devon and Torbay	12. Torbay	—N/a
South West	Devon	—N/a	13. Plymouth	—N/a
South West	Cornwall	—N/a	14. Isles of Scilly	—N/a
South West	Cornwall	—N/a	15. Cornwall	—N/a
West Midlands	Herefordshire	—N/a	1. Herefordshire	—N/a
West Midlands	Shropshire	—N/a	2. Shropshire	—N/a
West Midlands	Shropshire	—N/a	3. Telford and Wrekin	—N/a
West Midlands	Staffordshire	—N/a	—N/a	4. Staffordshire; a) Cannock Chase, b) East Staffordshire, c) Lichfield, d) Newcastle-under-Lyme, e) South Staffordshire, f) Stafford, g) Staffordshire Moorlands, h) Tamworth
West Midlands	Staffordshire	—N/a	5. Stoke-on-Trent	—N/a
West Midlands	Warwickshire	—N/a	—N/a	6. Warwickshire; a) North Warwickshire, b) Nuneaton and Bedworth, c) Rugby, d) Stratford-on-Avon, e) Warwick
West Midlands	7. West Midlands		a) Birmingham, b) Coventry, c) Dudley, d) Sandwell, e) Solihull, f) Walsall, g) Wolverhampton	—N/a
West Midlands	Worcestershire	—N/a	—N/a	8. Worcestershire; a) Bromsgrove, b) Malvern Hills, c) Redditch, d) Worcester, e) Wychavon, f) Wyre Forest

== See also ==
- Administrative geography of the United Kingdom
- Local government in England
