= East Midlands (disambiguation) =

The East Midlands is a region in central England.

East Midlands may also refer to several other things in, or associated with, the English region:

== Transport ==
- East Midlands Airport
- East Midlands Railway, a train operating company
- East Midlands Parkway railway station, a "park and ride" station on the Midlands Main Line
- East Midlands Hub railway station, a planned station between Nottingham and Derby on the HS2 line

== Other ==
- East Midlands (strategic authority area)
- East Midlands Combined Authority
- East Midlands (European Parliament constituency)
- East Midlands English, a traditional dialect
- East Midlands Oil Province, a geological area of oilfields
- East Midlands Counties Football League, a minor football league
- BBC East Midlands, a regional broadcaster
