= East Midlands Combined County Authority =

Strategic authority and combined county authority in England

Type
- Type: Combined county authority
- Houses: Unicameral
- Term limits: None

History
- Founded: 27 February 2024

Leadership
- Mayor: Claire Ward, Labour since 7 May 2024

Structure
- Graph of the party split among 9 seats.
- Political groups: All parties (9) Labour (5) Reform (4)

Elections
- Voting system: Directly elected mayor
- Last election: 2 May 2024
- Next election: 4 May 2028

Meeting place
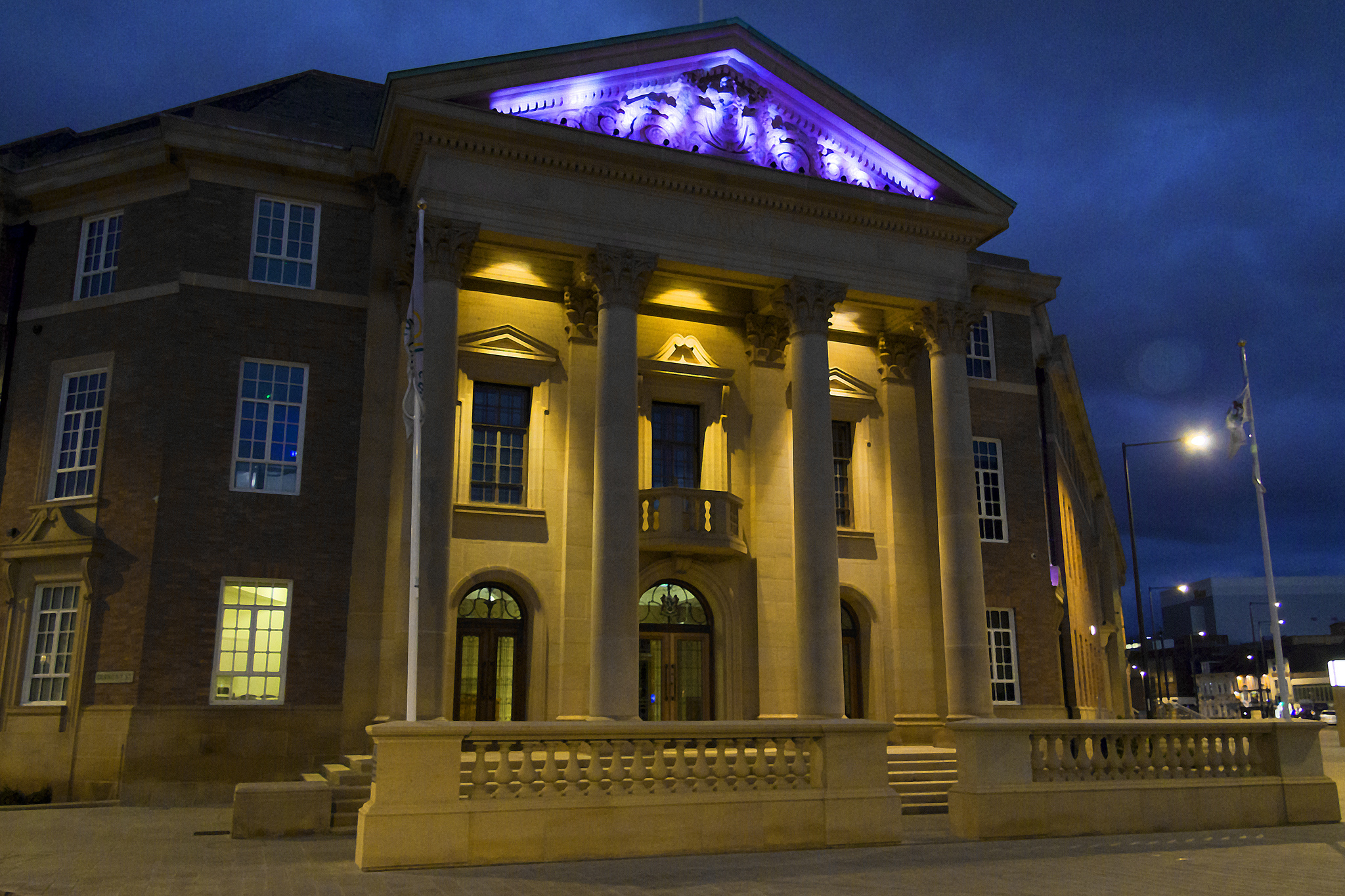
- Council House, Corporation Street, Derby

Website
- www.eastmidlands-cca.gov.uk

Constitution
- www.eastmidlands-cca.gov.uk/content/uploads/2024/11/EMCCA-Constitution-1.pdf

The East Midlands Combined County Authority (EMCCA) is a combined county authority for the East Midlands strategic authority area of England. It comprises the mayor of the East Midlands and the area's four upper-tier local authorities: Derbyshire County Council, Nottinghamshire County Council, Derby City Council, and Nottingham City Council. It does not cover the rest of the larger East Midlands region.

== History ==
A North Midlands combined authority was proposed by Derbyshire and Nottinghamshire in 2016. South Derbyshire District Council, High Peak Borough Council, Amber Valley Borough Council and Erewash Borough Council all voted to reject the proposal, and Chesterfield Borough Council decided to join the South Yorkshire Combined Authority instead. In July 2016, it was reported that the North Midlands devolution deal had collapsed. There has been support from several council leaders for an East Midlands combined authority (in response to the West Midlands) with discussions to follow on whether a directly elected mayor would be implemented, and on the future of the existing boroughs. The scope of the devolution deal has involved the counties of Derbyshire, Leicestershire, Lincolnshire and Nottinghamshire, as well as their cities. The leaders of seven Leicestershire councils wrote in 2020 to the Secretary of State for Housing, Communities and Local Government, who gave support.

In 2022, leaders of Nottinghamshire and Derbyshire county councils, and Nottingham and Derby city councils, stated that discussions had taken place for a deal, and that they were open to a mayoral deal. A proposal was made by Government and signed by the four councils on 30 August 2022, to form the first Mayoral Combined County Authority.

The deal was criticised for side-lining neighbouring Leicestershire and some politicians in Leicestershire expressed regret at being left out of the devolution deal, which had been opposed by Leicester City Council. The Centre for Cities said that even combining Derbyshire and Nottinghamshire was "a mistake" as "they are two different counties with distinct local economic needs" and "There is very little commuting between Nottinghamshire and Derbyshire". This is despite the same organisation including the Derbyshire district of Erewash in their definition of Nottingham.

The combined authority was formally established by the East Midlands Combined County Authority Regulations 2024 which were made on 27 February 2024.

The Mayor of East Midlands became a member of the Mayoral Council for England and the Council of the Nations and Regions when those bodies were established in October 2024.

In October 2026, the authority established Visit East Midlands, combining the various tourism bodies in the area, including "Visit Nottingham", "Visit Derby" and "Visit Derbyshire and the Peak District".

== Territorial extent ==
The area covered by the combined authority corresponds with the territory that makes up the constituent councils i.e. Derby, Derbyshire, Nottingham and Nottinghamshire and covers around 5,000 square kilometres (1,900 sq mi) with over 2 million residents. It includes the districts of Amber Valley, Ashfield, Bassetlaw, Bolsover, Broxtowe, Chesterfield, Derbyshire Dales, Erewash, Gedling, High Peak, Mansfield, Newark and Sherwood, North East Derbyshire, Rushcliffe and South Derbyshire.

Ceremonial county	Authorities	
Ceremonial county	Constituent members	Non-constituent members
Derbyshire	Derby City Council	
Derbyshire	Derbyshire County Council	Amber Valley
Derbyshire	Derbyshire County Council	Bolsover
Derbyshire	Derbyshire County Council	Chesterfield
Derbyshire	Derbyshire County Council	Derbyshire Dales
Derbyshire	Derbyshire County Council	Erewash
Derbyshire	Derbyshire County Council	High Peak
Derbyshire	Derbyshire County Council	North East Derbyshire
Derbyshire	Derbyshire County Council	South Derbyshire
Nottinghamshire	Nottingham City Council	
Nottinghamshire	Nottinghamshire County Council	Ashfield
Nottinghamshire	Nottinghamshire County Council	Bassetlaw
Nottinghamshire	Nottinghamshire County Council	Broxtowe
Nottinghamshire	Nottinghamshire County Council	Gedling
Nottinghamshire	Nottinghamshire County Council	Mansfield
Nottinghamshire	Nottinghamshire County Council	Newark and Sherwood
Nottinghamshire	Nottinghamshire County Council	Rushcliffe

== Governance and Advisory Structure ==
EMCCA is governed and guided by several statutory and advisory boards, committees, and panels in accordance with the Ministry of Housing, Communities & Local Government's (MHCLG) statutory guidance for combined authorities. The first meeting of the combined authority took place on 20 March 2023 at Chesterfield Town Hall and was chaired by Barry Lewis, the Leader of Derbyshire County Council.

On 13 October 2025 the EMCCA board agreed to seek the status of Established Mayoral Strategic Authority from MHCLG which would allow for an integrated settlement enabling greater spending freedoms.On 10 November 2025 the Mayor formally wrote to MHCLG to seek this status.

The EMCCA Board is made up of the Mayor of the East Midlands and the leaders and deputy leaders of Derbyshire County Council, Derby City Council, Nottinghamshire County Council and Nottingham City Council.

=== Board ===
At June 2026, the authority's board comprised the following:

Name	Membership	Position within nominating authority	Nominating authority
Claire Ward	Constituent	Mayor of the East Midlands	Direct election
Nadine Peatfield	Constituent	Leader of the Council	Derby City Council
Shiraz Khan	Constituent	Deputy Leader of the Council	Derby City Council
Alan Graves	Constituent	Leader of the Council	Derbyshire County Council
Stephen Reed	Constituent	Deputy Leader of the Council	Derbyshire County Council
Neghat Khan	Constituent	Leader of the Council	Nottingham City Council
Ethan Radford	Constituent	Deputy Leader of the Council	Nottingham City Council
Mick Barton	Constituent	Leader of the Council	Nottinghamshire County Council
Dawn Justice	Constituent	Deputy Leader of the Council	Nottinghamshire County Council
Tricia Gilby	Non-constituent		D2 Strategic Leadership Board (Derbyshire district / borough representatives)
Anthony McKeown	Non-constituent		D2 Strategic Leadership Board (Derbyshire district / borough representatives)
Julie Leigh	Non-constituent		N2 Economic Prosperity Committee (Nottinghamshire district / borough representatives)
Paul Peacock	Non-constituent		N2 Economic Prosperity Committee (Nottinghamshire district / borough representatives)

== See also ==
- The Derby, Derbyshire, Nottingham and Nottinghamshire Local Enterprise Partnership
