= Primary urban area =

Definition used for comparing English cities

A primary urban area (PUA) is an area defined by the Department for Communities and Local Government in the United Kingdom as a statistical tool for analysing the major cities of England, originating as part of their State of the English Cities report and database. The concept of a primary urban area has also been redefined by the Centre for Cities with the University of Newcastle.

== Original purpose and definition ==
The concept of a primary urban area was created in an attempt to enable economic and social comparisons between cities using definitions less arbitrary than the administrative boundaries of local authorities, but avoiding one problem of using the urban areas defined by the Office for National Statistics - that sprawling conurbations such as the West Yorkshire Urban Area, containing multiple distinct settlements with large degrees of physical and social independence, but that happen to touch, end up being treated as if they were a single city.

To enable this, primary urban areas are defined as being based on areas of continuous built-up land containing urban structures that are within 50 metres of each other, while urban areas only require that urban land uses should be less than 200 metres apart.

In addition, to qualify as a primary urban area a built-up area must have a population in excess of 125,000. On this basis England had 56 primary urban areas in 2007.

As primary urban areas were created to allow statistical comparisons, and the majority of statistics are produced based on administrative or electoral geographies, primary urban areas are approximated to local authority and ward level, or to an additional measure called a tract – similar in size to a ward but designed to be subject to fewer revisions over time. It is for these approximate areas that statistics are available. Wards and tracts, being smaller, allow a greater degree of precision in comparing PUAs, but using local authority-based definitions allow PUA comparisons to be made using the wider range of statistics available at this level.

Primary urban areas are designed purely as a tool of statistical analysis and aren't intended to form definitive measures of cities for policy purposes. They are named after the largest settlement within them.

== Issues with primary urban areas ==
The primary urban area model may be somewhat as flawed in the case of contiguous urban areas that contain multiple distinct settlements that have agglomerated, because it treats them as a single city. A good example of this is the Birmingham PUA, which includes Wolverhampton as well as Birmingham. Wolverhampton is regarded by some measures as independent of Birmingham and a city-region of its own. Whilst Birmingham dominates the south and east of the West Midlands urban area, and Wolverhampton dominates the north and west, the area of conurbation between the two cities (the Black Country) displays a complex pattern of interdependence both within the area and to the two cities, making statistical separation of the area rather difficult. The PUA model and its Eurostat equivalent differ in their treatment of Wolverhampton: the former aggregates it with Birmingham, whereas the latter gives it its own larger urban zone.

When primary urban areas are approximated to local authority areas rather than wards they can also contain rural areas or have parts of the urban area excluded from the relevant PUA. The Leeds PUA is an example of the former, where the City of Leeds local authority area that is contained within the PUA includes a wide rural area in addition to the urban cores; whilst the Manchester PUA does not contain Wilmslow which is a part of the Greater Manchester Urban Area but outside the local authorities that make up the approximated PUA.

Another issue with the PUA model is what constitutes a contiguous urban area. The original Greater Manchester PUA for example did not include the contiguous urban boroughs of Wigan, Bolton and Rochdale, all of which are linked strongly with the core city region – for example by transport (via Transport for Greater Manchester), shopping/leisure e.g. Trafford Centre, various sporting events, administrative history (Greater Manchester County Council and nightlife.

Liverpool's PUA is far smaller than the City Region and Metropolitan Area, because of the River Mersey cutting through the middle of the city. This is controversial as Birkenhead (also a part of Merseyside) is categorised as a separate primary urban area from Liverpool despite its proximity and connections to Liverpool on the opposite side of the river. This differs from the Liverpool Metropolitan Area, which includes Wirral and extends into Cheshire.

== List of original primary urban areas ==
These were the PUAs identified by the study:

Aldershot	Coventry	Luton	Reading
Barnsley	Crawley	Manchester	Rochdale
Birkenhead	Derby	Mansfield	Sheffield
Birmingham	Doncaster	Middlesbrough	Southampton
Blackburn	Gloucester	Milton Keynes	Southend
Blackpool	Grimsby	Newcastle	Stoke
Bolton	Hastings	Northampton	Sunderland
Bournemouth	Huddersfield	Norwich	Swindon
Bradford	Hull	Nottingham	Telford
Brighton	Ipswich	Oxford	Wakefield
Bristol	Leeds	Peterborough	Warrington
Burnley	Leicester	Plymouth	Wigan
Cambridge	Liverpool	Portsmouth	Worthing
Chatham	London	Preston	York

== List of updated primary urban areas ==
In late 2015, the Centre for Cities, supported by the University of Newcastle's Centre for Urban and Regional Development Studies (who formulated the original definition), updated the list of PUAs. The major changes were to (a) use the day-time population of the city as a better indicator of its significance than the number of its residents – the City of London is an extreme example of this phenomenon; (b) raise the threshold for inclusion to 135,000; (c) reduce the weighting of "travel to work area". They added Basildon, Exeter and Slough to the list and removed Grimsby and Hastings. Bolton and Rochdale were absorbed into Manchester. They also included British cities outside England including the Scottish cities of Aberdeen, Dundee, Edinburgh and Glasgow, the Welsh cities of Swansea, Cardiff and Newport and the Northern Irish city of Belfast. The following PUAs were defined by the study:

Aldershot	Coventry	Mansfield	Slough
Barnsley	Crawley	Middlesbrough	Southampton
Basildon	Derby	Milton Keynes	Southend
Birkenhead	Doncaster	Newcastle	Stoke
Birmingham	Exeter	Northampton	Sunderland
Blackburn	Gloucester	Norwich	Swindon
Blackpool	Huddersfield	Nottingham	Telford
Bournemouth	Hull	Oxford	Wakefield
Bradford	Ipswich	Peterborough	Warrington
Brighton	Leeds	Plymouth	Wigan
Bristol	Leicester	Portsmouth	Worthing
Burnley	Liverpool	Preston	York
Cambridge	Luton	Reading	
Chatham	Manchester	Sheffield	

== See also ==
- Travel to work area
