= Borough of Chesterfield =

Borough and non-metropolitan local government district Derbyshire, England

- Non-metropolitan district and borough
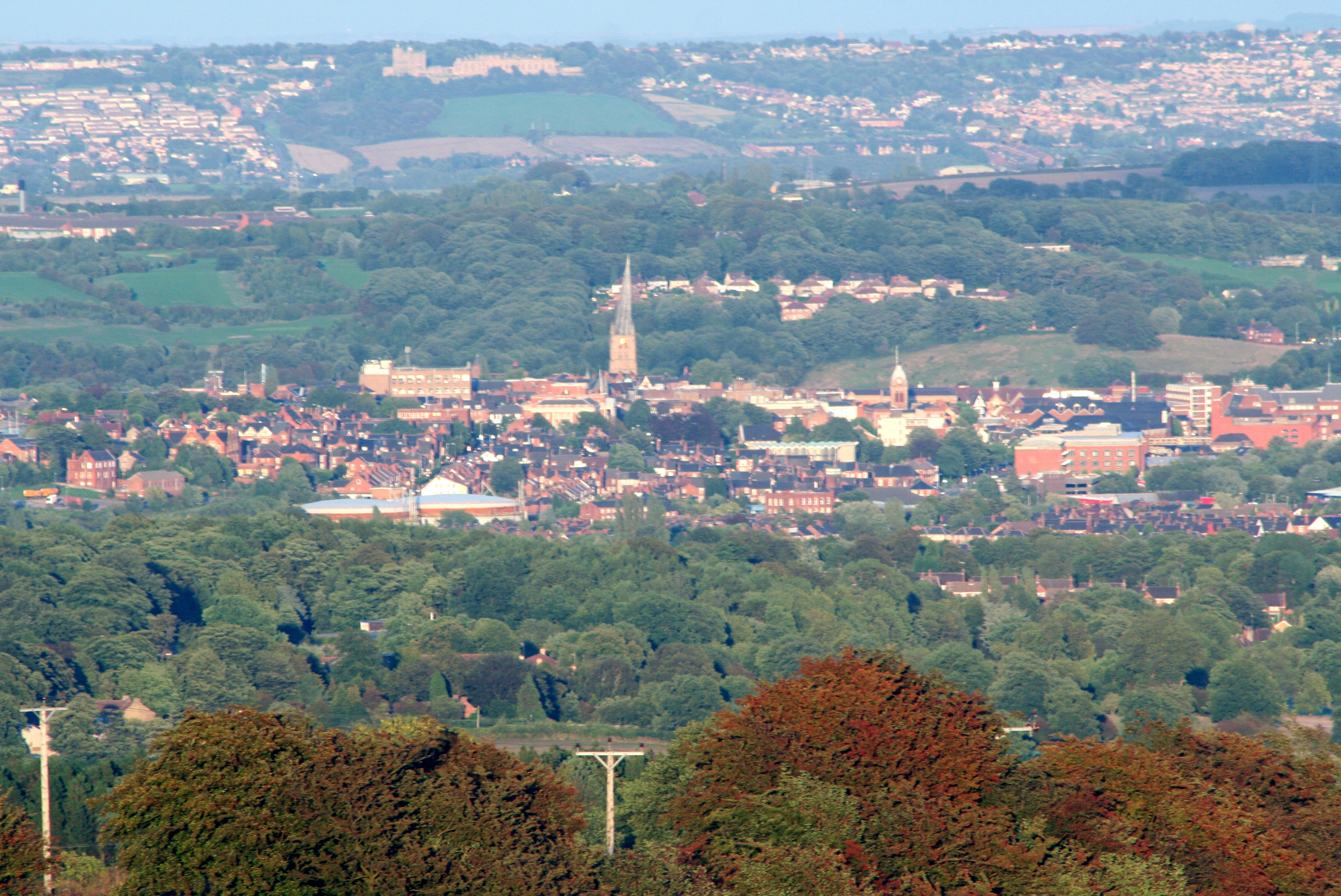
- Chesterfield skyline and the Crooked Spire of Chesterfield Parish Church.

- Shown within Derbyshire

- Location within England Location within the United Kingdom Location in Europe
- Coordinates: 53°14′N 1°25′W
- Sovereign state: United Kingdom
- Country: England
- Region: East Midlands
- County: Derbyshire

Government
  - Type: Non-metropolitan district
  - Local Authority: Chesterfield Borough Council
  - MPs: Toby Perkins (L); Louise Jones (L)

Area
  - Land: 25.50 sq mi (66.04 km^{2})

Population (2024)
  - Total: 106,045 (Ranked 232nd)
  - Density: 415.9/sq mi (160.58/km^{2})

Ethnicity (2021)
  - Ethnic groups: List: 95.5% White; 1.9% Asian; 1.4% Mixed; 0.8% Black; 0.4% other

Religion (2021)
  - Religion: List: 50.5% Christianity; 47.1% no religion; 1.4% other; 1% Islam
- Time zone: UTC+0 (Greenwich Mean Time)
- Postcode: S40, S41
- Post town: chesterfield
- Dialling code: 01246
- ISO 3166-2: GB-DBY
- ONS code: 17UD (ONS); E07000034 (GSS)
- OS grid reference: SK382711
- Demonym: Cestrefeldian

The Borough of Chesterfield is a non-metropolitan district with borough status in Derbyshire, England. It is named after the town of Chesterfield, its largest town, and also contains the town of Staveley and the villages of Barrow Hill, Brimington, Duckmanton, Hollingwood, New Whittington, Netherthorpe, Old Whittington and Tapton. In 2022 it had a population of 104,110.

The borough borders the North East Derbyshire district to the north, west and south, and the Bolsover district to the east.

== History ==
The town of Chesterfield had been an ancient borough. It was reformed to become a municipal borough in 1836 under the Municipal Corporations Act 1835, governed by a corporate body called "the mayor, aldermen and burgesses of the borough of Chesterfield", generally known as the corporation or town council. The modern district was formed on 1 April 1974 under the Local Government Act 1972 as one of nine non-metropolitan districts within Derbyshire. The new district covered the area of two former districts and a single parish from a third, which were all abolished at the same time:

- Brimington parish from Chesterfield Rural District
- Chesterfield Municipal Borough
- Staveley Urban District

The new district was named Chesterfield after its largest town. The new Chesterfield district was granted borough status from its creation, allowing the chair of the council to take the title of mayor, continuing Chesterfield's series of mayors dating back to 1598.

Under current local government restructuring plans it is planned that the district will be abolished in 2028, with its area forming part of a new Derbyshire North unitary authority.

== Governance ==
Chesterfield Borough Council

Type
- Type: Non-metropolitan district

Leadership
- Mayor: Shirley Niblock, Liberal Democrat since 13 May 2026
- Leader: Tricia Gilby, Labour since 10 May 2017
- Chief Executive: Christine Durrant since 4 May 2026

Structure
- Seats: 40 councillors
- Graph of the party split among 40 seats.
- Political groups: Administration (27) Labour (27) Other parties (13) Liberal Democrats (11) Reform (2)

Elections
- Last election: 4 May 2023
- Next election: 6 May 2027

Meeting place
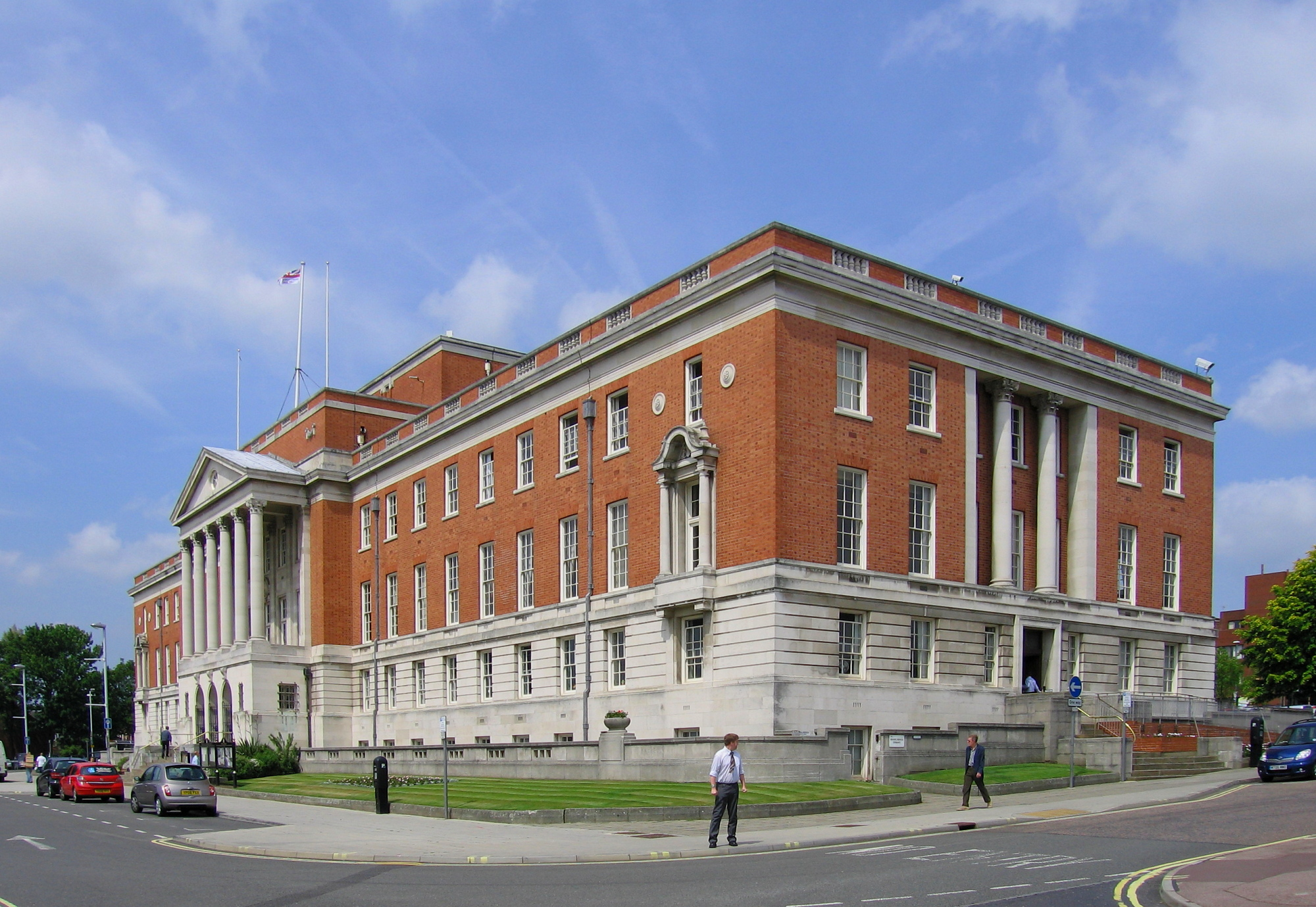
- Town Hall, Rose Hill, Chesterfield, S40 1LP

Website
- www.chesterfield.gov.uk

Chesterfield Borough Council provides district-level services. County-level services are provided by Derbyshire County Council. The Staveley and Brimington parts of the borough are also covered by civil parishes, which form a third tier of local government.

Since 2014 the borough has been a non-constituent member of the South Yorkshire Mayoral Authority (formerly known as the Sheffield City Region); the council sends representatives to meetings of the combined authority, but the electorate of Chesterfield do not vote in elections for the Mayor of South Yorkshire.. However, the relationship with South Yorkshire is indirect; it is more a partnership as a non-constituent member, unlike (i.e) the full membership held by the City of Sheffield.

Simultaneously, broader scale, Chesterfield is a direct part of the East Midlands Combined County Authority, which held its inaugural mayoral election in 2024. Residents in Chesterfield are eligible to vote for the Mayor of East Midlands, alongside voters in the rest of Derbyshire and Nottinghamshire (expanding around 5,000 square kilometres).

=== Political control ===
The council has been under Labour majority control since 2011.

The first election to the borough council as reformed under the Local Government Act 1972 was held in 1973, initially operating as a shadow authority alongside the outgoing authorities until the new arrangements came into effect on 1 April 1974. Political control of the council since 1974 has been as follows:

| Party in control | Years |
|---|---|
| Labour | 1974–2003 |
| Liberal Democrats | 2003–2011 |
| Labour | 2011–present |

=== Leadership ===
The role of mayor is largely ceremonial in Chesterfield. Political leadership is instead provided by the leader of the council. The leaders since 1975 have been:

| Councillor | Party | From | To |
|---|---|---|---|
| Bill Flanagan | Labour | 1975 | 2001 |
| John Burrows | Labour | 2001 | 2003 |
| Ray Russell | Liberal Democrats | 2003 | 2011 |
| John Burrows | Labour | 18 May 2011 | May 2017 |
| Tricia Gilby | Labour | 10 May 2017 | |

=== Composition ===
Following the 2023 election, and subsequent by-elections up to May 2026, the composition of the council was:

| Party | Councillors |
|---|---|
| Labour | 27 |
| Liberal Democrats | 11 |
| Reform | 2 |
| Total | 40 |

The next election is due in 2027.

=== Elections ===
Since the last boundary changes in 2023, the council has comprised 40 councillors representing 16 wards, with each ward electing two or three councillors. Elections are held every four years.

=== Premises ===
The council is based at Chesterfield Town Hall on Rose Hill, which was purpose-built for the council in 1938.

== Geography ==
The borough is situated around the town of Chesterfield and includes the villages of Old Whittington, Brimington (which also has a parish council), Sheepbridge and New Whittington, and the town of Staveley which maintains a town council. The borough's main two towns are Chesterfield and Staveley. With its geographical position, the borough offers convenient commuter links to the cities of Sheffield, Nottingham, Derby, Bradford, Wakefield, Manchester, Salford, Leeds and Lincoln, and via its mainline railway station at Chesterfield and the connections to the M1 motorway.

=== Travel to work areas ===
Chesterfield and its surrounding borough are situated around multiple travel to work areas which span from the counties of Greater Manchester, South Yorkshire, West Yorkshire and Nottinghamshire as well as Derbyshire. The cities of Nottingham, Manchester, Derby, Wakefield and Sheffield are the closest cities to Chesterfield and its surrounding borough.

== Suburbs ==
Suburbs of Chesterfield include:

- Birdholme
- Boythorpe
- Brampton
- Hasland
- Newbold
- Spital
- Tapton
- Whittington Moor

== Landmarks ==
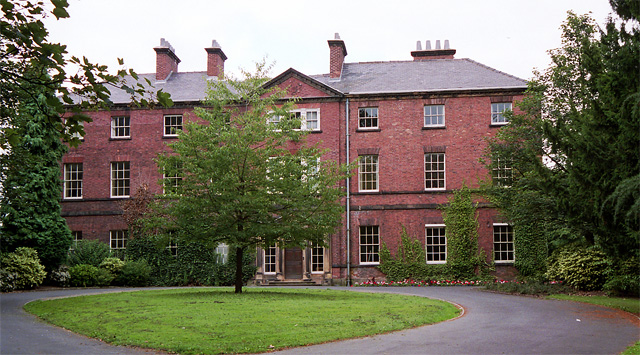
Tapton House

Tapton House was once the home of engineer George Stephenson, who built the first public railway line in the world to use steam locomotives.

Church of St Mary and All Saints, also known as Chesterfield Parish Church, is an Anglican church dedicated to Saint Mary and All Saints. St Mary's is known for its twisted and leaning spire (known as the Crooked Spire). It is the largest parish church in the Diocese of Derby and forms part of the Archdeaconry of Chesterfield.

=== Places of interest ===
- Chesterfield Town Hall
- Revolution House
- Somersall Hall

== Sport ==
=== Football ===
The biggest football club in the Borough of Chesterfield is Chesterfield Football Club, who play in EFL League Two of the English football pyramid. They play in the SMH Group Stadium, which has a capacity of 10,600. They were originally founded on 19 October 1867, but its current form was founded on the 24 April 1919.

=== Rugby ===
The Borough of Chesterfield have a rugby club called the Chesterfield Panthers, who currently play in the Midlands 4 East (North) of the English rugby pyramid. They play in Duston Road Stadium, and they were founded in 2008.

== Sources ==
- Chesterfield Borough Council - Home
- Map and Details for Chesterfield Borough Council Local Authority
- chesterfield borough council Archives
- Chesterfield Borough Council
- The Borough of Chesterfield (Electoral Changes) Order 1999
- Your Councillors
- History
- Story of Chesterfield
- Our Town in History
- Chesterfield | England, United Kingdom
- Genuki: Chesterfield, Derbyshire
- History of Chesterfield: Early and medieval Chesterfield
- Chesterfield - Town
- Chesterfield (District, United Kingdom) - Population Statistics, Charts, Map and Location
- Chesterfield Registration District
- Chesterfield District – DDA
- New executive directors appointed at Chesterfield Borough Council
- Chesterfield Borough Council
- The Derbyshire (District Boundaries) Order 1988
