= 2023 Chesterfield Borough Council election =

2023 English local election

- 4 May 2023

All 40 seats on Chesterfield Borough Council 21 seats needed for a majority

	First party	Second party	Third party
Leader	Tricia Gilby	Paul Holmes	Paul Mann
Party	Labour	Liberal Democrats	Independent
Last election	28 (43.5%)	17 (39.0%)	3 (5.7%)
Seats before	29	17	2
Seats won	28	12	0
- Winner of each seat at the 2023 Chesterfield Borough Council election
Leader before election
Tricia Gilby
Labour
Leader after election
Tricia Gilby
Labour

The 2023 Chesterfield Borough Council election took place on 4 May 2023 to elect all 40 members of Chesterfield Borough Council in Derbyshire, England. This was on the same day as other local elections across England.

== Results summary ==
Following the results, the council remained under Labour control. New ward boundaries took effect for this election following a review by the Local Government Boundary Commission for England, reducing the number of seats from 48 to 40. Only the Staveley South seat (previously called Hollingwood and Inkersall) had its boundaries left entirely unchanged. Labour retained its majority on the council with an increased share of the seats, as the Liberal Democrats and Independents lost seats.

Based on estimates for what the previous position would have been under the new boundaries, Labour notionally 'gained' Brampton East and Boythorpe, Brampton West and Loundsley Green and Linacre wards from the Liberal Democrats and Staveley South from Independents and that the Liberal Democrats notionally 'gained' Staveley North from Labour.

2023 Chesterfield Borough Council election
Party	Candidates	Seats	Gains	Losses	Net gain/loss	Seats %	Votes %	Votes	+/−
Labour	40	28			Steady	70.0	46.8	27,904	+3.3
Liberal Democrats	35	12			▼5	30.0	32.6	19,440	–6.4
Conservative	18	0			Steady	0.0	9.5	5,677	+0.4
Green	9	0			Steady	0.0	4.5	2,704	+3.4
Independent	9	0			▼3	0.0	4.2	2,516	–1.5
Chesterfield Independents	10	0			Steady	0.0	2.3	1,392	+1.7

== Ward results ==
The results for each ward were as follows, with an asterisk (*) indicating a sitting councillor standing for re-election.

=== Brampton East and Boythorpe ===
Brampton East and Boythorpe
Party	Candidate	Votes	%	±%
Labour	Jonathan Davies	566	47.1	
Liberal Democrats	Glenys Falconer*	528	43.9	
Liberal Democrats	Keith Falconer*	522	43.4	
Labour	Janice Marriott*	496	41.3	
Green	Andrew Clarke	132	11.0	
Chesterfield Independents	Daryl Portas	52	4.3	
Turnout		1,206	33.45	
Labour win (new seat)				
Liberal Democrats win (new seat)				

=== Brampton West and Loundsley Green ===
Brampton West and Loundsley Green
Party	Candidate	Votes	%	±%
Labour	Bob Brock	987	41.2	
Labour	Martin Stone	977	40.8	
Liberal Democrats	Shirley Niblock*	971	40.5	
Liberal Democrats	Paul Niblock*	970	40.5	
Liberal Democrats	Howard Borrell*	968	40.4	
Labour	Pauline Twigg	871	36.3	
Conservative	William Birkett	420	17.5	
Chesterfield Independents	David Jones	233	9.7	
Turnout		2,408	41.68	
Labour win (new seat)				
Labour win (new seat)				
Liberal Democrats win (new seat)				

=== Brimington North ===
Brimington North
Party	Candidate	Votes	%	±%
Labour	Dave Culley	604	70.7	
Labour	Suzie Perkins*	525	61.5	
Independent	Graeme Challands	133	15.6	
Independent	Cheryl Jackson	123	14.4	
Conservative	Rod Harrison	103	12.1	
Liberal Democrats	Margarita Jacobs	65	7.6	
Liberal Democrats	Andy Jakins	48	5.6	
Turnout		858	22.58	
Labour win (new seat)				
Labour win (new seat)				

=== Brimington South ===
Brimington South
Party	Candidate	Votes	%	±%
Labour	Tricia Gilby*	667	47.2	
Labour	Ian Callan*	638	45.1	
Liberal Democrats	Stephen Hartley	566	40.0	
Liberal Democrats	Jane Collins	524	37.1	
Conservative	Malcolm Rowley	228	16.1	
Turnout		1,421	33.21	
Labour win (new seat)				
Labour win (new seat)				

=== Brockwell ===
Brockwell
Party	Candidate	Votes	%	±%
Liberal Democrats	Maureen Davenport*	737	52.1	
Liberal Democrats	Katherine Hollingworth*	685	48.4	
Labour	Robert Goodall	472	33.4	
Labour	Glynn Jordan	440	31.1	
Conservative	Jane Bird	153	10.8	
Green	Janet Ratcliffe	145	10.2	
Chesterfield Independents	Adele Downer	71	5.0	
Turnout		1,419	36.52	
Liberal Democrats win (new seat)				
Liberal Democrats win (new seat)				

=== Dunston ===
Dunston
Party	Candidate	Votes	%	±%
Labour	Jean Innes*	793	50.5	
Labour	Gordon McLaren	743	47.3	
Labour	Michelle Twigg	693	44.1	
Liberal Democrats	Sandra Bridge	275	17.5	
Liberal Democrats	Ewan Cameron	272	17.3	
Conservative	Linda Rowley	265	16.9	
Liberal Democrats	Linda Thompson	238	15.1	
Chesterfield Independents	Paul Stone	219	13.9	
Green	David Fox	190	12.1	
Chesterfield Independents	Alan Heathcote	161	10.2	
Chesterfield Independents	Samuel Hartley	155	9.9	
Independent	Gordon Simmons*	133	8.5	
Turnout		1,572	26.47	
Labour win (new seat)				
Labour win (new seat)				
Labour win (new seat)				

=== Hasland ===
Hasland
Party	Candidate	Votes	%	±%
Labour	Mick Brady*	1,066	46.1	
Labour	Amanda Serjeant*	904	39.1	
Labour	Stuart Brittain*	896	38.8	
Green	Darren Yates	661	28.6	
Conservative	Paul Gibbons	656	28.4	
Conservative	Jacob Rodgers	557	24.1	
Conservative	Craig Stanley	540	23.4	
Green	Simon Geikie	476	20.6	
Green	Simon Swift	473	20.5	
Liberal Democrats	Elizabeth Frear	156	6.8	
Liberal Democrats	Linda Shipley	115	5.0	
Liberal Democrats	Tom Hudson	112	4.8	
Turnout		2,322	38.72	
Labour win (new seat)				
Labour win (new seat)				
Labour win (new seat)				

=== Linacre ===
Linacre
Party	Candidate	Votes	%	±%
Labour	Gavin Baldauf-Good	710	41.8	
Labour	Judy Staton	644	37.9	
Conservative	Stephen Lynch	553	32.6	
Conservative	Ian Jerram	549	32.3	
Liberal Democrats	Bridget Dunks	426	25.1	
Liberal Democrats	Peter Gately	420	24.7	
Turnout		1,706	41.60	
Labour win (new seat)				
Labour win (new seat)				

=== Rother ===
Rother
Party	Candidate	Votes	%	±%
Labour	Jenny Flood*	841	66.5	
Labour	Lisa Blakemore*	831	65.7	
Labour	Keith Miles*	767	60.7	
Liberal Democrats	Harry Holloway	236	18.7	
Liberal Democrats	Paul King	234	18.5	
Liberal Democrats	Kevin Maher	211	16.7	
Conservative	Jonathan Potts	211	16.7	
Turnout		1,278	22.94	
Labour win (new seat)				
Labour win (new seat)				
Labour win (new seat)				

=== Spire ===
Spire
Party	Candidate	Votes	%	±%
Labour	Laura Bagley	954	49.8	
Labour	Kate Sarvent*	929	48.5	
Labour	Peter Innes*	902	47.1	
Liberal Democrats	Ed Fordham*	743	38.8	
Liberal Democrats	Adrian Mather	720	37.6	
Liberal Democrats	Greg Campbell	718	37.5	
Chesterfield Independents	Susan Armenante	191	10.0	
Conservative	Jack Woolley	186	9.7	
Turnout		1,933	34.73	
Labour win (new seat)				
Labour win (new seat)				
Labour win (new seat)				

=== Staveley Central ===
Staveley Central
Party	Candidate	Votes	%	±%
Labour	Barry Dyke*	458	53.0	
Labour	Jacquie Ridgway	410	47.5	
Independent	Paul Wilson	196	22.7	
Independent	Keith Bannister	192	22.2	
No Description	Carl Chambers	183	21.2	
Conservative	Carole Tilson	82	9.5	
Green	Jeffrey Horton	80	9.3	
Turnout		870	22.80	
Labour win (new seat)				
Labour win (new seat)				

=== Staveley North ===
Staveley North
Party	Candidate	Votes	%	±%
Liberal Democrats	Paul Jacobs	506	50.4	
Liberal Democrats	June Bingham	465	46.4	
Labour	Lisa Collins*	346	34.5	
Labour	Dean Collins*	344	34.3	
Conservative	Ian Tagg	113	11.3	
Chesterfield Independents	Donna Robertshaw	79	7.9	
Turnout		1,004	27.31	
Liberal Democrats win (new seat)				
Liberal Democrats win (new seat)				

=== Staveley South ===
Staveley South
Party	Candidate	Votes	%	±%
Labour	Debbie Wheeldon*	844	53.2	
Labour	Allan Ogle	770	48.5	
Labour	Stuart Yates	763	48.1	
Independent	Paul Mann*	564	35.5	
Independent	Dean Rhodes	512	32.3	
Independent	Ruth Perry*	480	30.2	
Conservative	John Hobson	239	15.1	
Turnout		1,591	27.61	
Labour win (new seat)				
Labour win (new seat)				
Labour win (new seat)				

=== Walton ===
Walton
Party	Candidate	Votes	%	±%
Liberal Democrats	Maggie Kellman*	1,264	51.5	
Liberal Democrats	Nick Redihough*	1,205	49.1	
Liberal Democrats	Tom Snowdon*	1,151	46.9	
Labour	Lucy McManus	814	33.2	
Labour	Steve Brunt	735	30.0	
Labour	David Rice	602	24.5	
Conservative	Alison Hounslow	443	18.1	
Green	David Wadsworth	393	16.0	
Turnout		2,461	44.10	
Liberal Democrats win (new seat)				
Liberal Democrats win (new seat)				
Liberal Democrats win (new seat)				

=== Whittington ===
Whittington
Party	Candidate	Votes	%	±%
Liberal Democrats	Barry Bingham*	1,239	64.7	
Liberal Democrats	Paul Holmes*	931	48.6	
Liberal Democrats	Kelly Thornton*	896	46.8	
Labour	Steve Lismore	625	32.6	
Labour	Corina Nicholls	515	26.9	
Labour	Marion Thorpe	472	24.6	
Conservative	Susan Gibbons	190	9.9	
Chesterfield Independents	Rose Clark	150	7.8	
Turnout		1,918	29.14	
Liberal Democrats win (new seat)				
Liberal Democrats win (new seat)				
Liberal Democrats win (new seat)				

=== Whittington Moor ===
Whittington Moor
Party	Candidate	Votes	%	±%
Labour	Kate Caulfield*	698	62.8	
Labour	Leslie Thompson	592	53.2	
Conservative	John Gleadall	189	17.0	
Liberal Democrats	Maisie Hollingworth	162	14.6	
Liberal Democrats	Leslie Ralph	161	14.5	
Green	Sophie Haworth	154	13.8	
Chesterfield Independents	Brad Waterhouse	81	7.3	
Turnout		1,118	25.05	
Labour win (new seat)				
Labour win (new seat)				

== Changes 2023–2027 ==
The Spire by-election in July 2024 was a Labour hold and did not change the council's composition. Labour gained a seat from the Liberal Democrats in the Staveley North by-election held that month, leaving Labour with 29 seats and the Liberal Democrats with 11. The Brampton East and Boythorpe by-election in May 2025 returned the seat to the Liberal Democrats, restoring the 28–12 Labour–Liberal Democrat split. In May 2026, Reform UK won both Staveley North seats, one from Labour and one from the Liberal Democrats; the council consequently comprised 27 Labour councillors, 11 Liberal Democrat councillors and two Reform UK councillors.

== By-elections ==
=== Spire ===
Spire: 4 July 2024
Party	Candidate	Votes	%	±%
Labour	Sharon Blank	1,521	45.1	−2.0
Liberal Democrats	Ed Fordham*	621	18.4	−20.4
Green	Vicky Noble	511	15.2	N/A
Conservative	Jacob Rodgers	499	14.8	+5.1
Chesterfield Independents	Kris Stone	220	6.5	−3.5
Turnout		3,406	57.81	+23.08
Labour hold		Swing		

The Spire by-election followed the death of Labour councillor Peter Innes, who had represented Old Whittington from 2015 until 2023 and Spire from May 2023. Chesterfield Borough Council formally recorded his death and observed a minute's silence at its meeting on 24 April 2024.

=== Staveley North 2024 ===
Staveley North: 4 July 2024
Party	Candidate	Votes	%	±%
Labour	Steve Lismore	635	34.4	−0.1
Liberal Democrats	Stephen Hartley	592	32.1	−14.3
Conservative	Harry Smith	278	15.1	+3.8
Independent	Martin Hibbert	188	10.2	N/A
Green	Joshua Ward	151	8.2	N/A
Turnout		1,872	50.23	+22.92
Labour gain from Liberal Democrats		Swing		

The by-election was triggered by the death of Liberal Democrat councillor June Bingham.

=== Brampton East and Boythorpe ===
Brampton East and Boythorpe: 1 May 2025
Party	Candidate	Votes	%	±%
Liberal Democrats	Keith Falconer	410	34.6	−7.8
Reform	Courtney James	350	29.6	N/A
Labour	Pauline Twigg	235	19.8	−27.3
Independent	Jane Hindle	90	7.6	N/A
Green	Katherine Noble	48	4.1	−6.9
Conservative	Jacob Rodgers	42	3.5	N/A
Chesterfield Independents	David Jones	9	0.8	−3.5
Turnout		1,189	32.49	
Liberal Democrats gain from Labour		Swing		

The by-election was triggered by the resignation of Labour councillor Rebecca Grundy.

=== Staveley North 2026 ===
Staveley North: 7 May 2026 (2 seats)
Party	Candidate	Votes	%	±%
Reform	Steven Barlow	490	38.8	
Reform	Dawn Taylor	430	34.0	
Liberal Democrats	Jane Collins	410	32.5	
Liberal Democrats	Stephen Hartley	393	31.1	
Green	Robert Ferrie	144	11.4	
Green	Alison Riley	144	11.4	
Labour	Dean Collins	124	9.8	
Labour	Lisa Collins	113	8.9	
Independent	Martin Hibbert	67	5.3	
Independent	Vicki Holmes	50	4.0	
Conservative	John Boult	46	3.6	
Conservative	Alison Hounslow	35	2.8	
Chesterfield Ind.	Kris Stone	19	1.5	
Turnout		1,264	34.21	
Rejected ballots		1		
Registered electors		3,695		
Reform gain from Liberal Democrats		Swing		
Reform gain from Labour		Swing		

The by-election was held after the deaths of Labour councillor Steve Lismore and Liberal Democrat councillor Paul Jacobs, which left both Staveley North seats vacant.
