= Jon Hess =

Jon or Jonathan Hess may refer to:

- Jon Hess (fighter) (born 1969), American martial artist
- Jon Hess (lacrosse), retired lacrosse player
- Jonathan Hess (figure skater) (born 2000), German figure skater
- Jonathan M. Hess (1965–2018), American philologist

== See also ==
- John Hess (disambiguation)
