= State of the English Cities =

2006 study of the major cities of England

The State of the English Cities was a 2006 study of the social and economic performance of the major cities of England, sponsored by the Communities and Local Government department of the United Kingdom Government.

== History ==
The programme was commissioned by the then Office of the Deputy Prime Minister in 2000 as a result of the Urban White Paper Our Towns and Cities: The Future - Delivering an Urban Renaissance, which drew attention to the importance of major cities in driving economic growth.

One of the main challenges of the study was to make sure that the statistics used were comparable across cities and not skewed by local authority boundaries, which often do not reflect the physical or economic realities of the settlements they define. Instead of focussing on political areas statistics were therefore published for primary urban areas and travel to work areas, as respectively physical and economic models of cities' extent, and areas of town centre activity, reflecting cities' central business districts.

An interim progress report was published in January 2005, with the main State of the English Cities report being published in March 2006, and the State of the Cities Database of comparative statistics going live in November 2006.
