= John Hess (journalist) =

- Born: 12 March 1955 (age 71); Solihull, Warwickshire, England
- Occupations: Journalist and broadcaster
- Known for: East Midlands Today (1997–2015)
- Political party: Labour

John Hess (born 12 March 1955) is a British journalist and broadcaster who is primarily based in the East Midlands.

== Early life ==
He attended Solihull School.

== Career ==
He started his career on evening newspapers in Coventry and Birmingham. The general election he first covered was that in February 1974.

=== BBC ===
His first job for the BBC was at Radio Nottingham.

He was a political journalist for Midlands based in Birmingham. He worked on The Midlands at Westminster on BBC2.

He became the Political Editor for the BBC's East Midlands Today in 1997. He presented the East Midlands segment for The Politics Show, in co-operation with Marie Ashby (née Stevenson). There were 45 MPs in the region that he covered. He was based at the BBC Centre on London Road (A60) in Nottingham. He retired from East Midlands Today in 2015.

== Political career ==
In June 2023 Hess announced he was running to be the Labour candidate for 2024 East Midlands mayoral election, however he was unsuccessful.

He also stood unsuccessfully for the Labour Party in the 2025 Nottinghamshire County Council election.
