= Mayor of the East Midlands =

Elected mayor in England

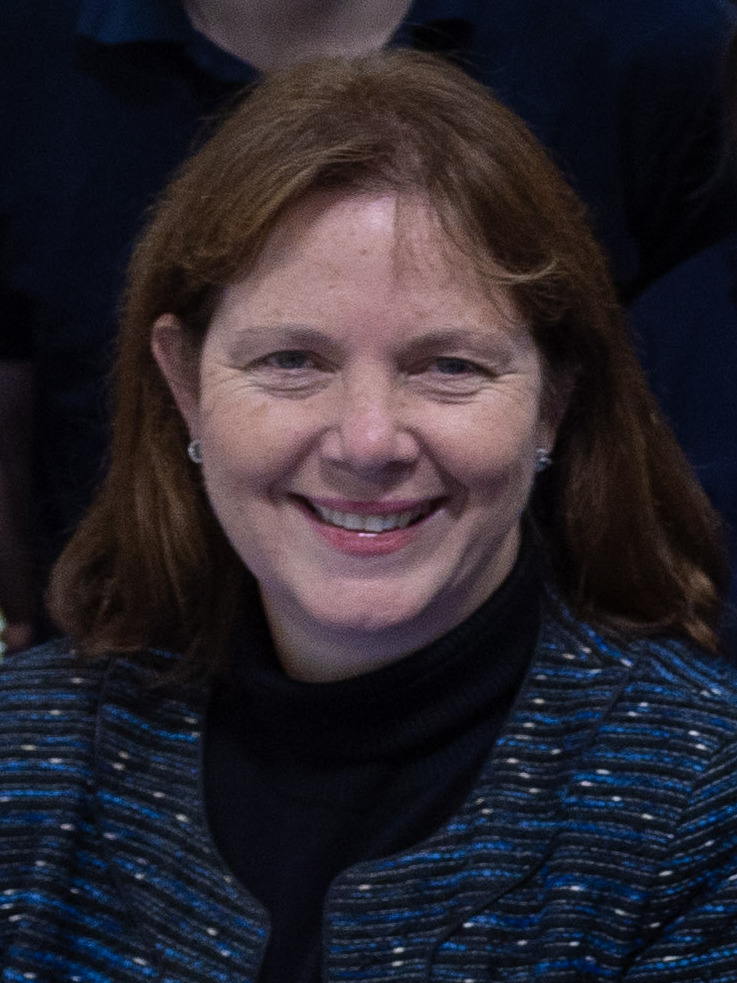
- Incumbent; Claire Ward since 7 May 2024
- Style: Mayor
- Appointer: Electorate of the East Midlands Combined County Authority area
- Term length: Four years
- Inaugural holder: Claire Ward
- Formation: 7 May 2024
- Website: https://www.eastmidlands-cca.gov.uk/the-mayor/

The mayor of the East Midlands is a strategic authority mayor for the East Midlands Combined County Authority (Nottinghamshire, Nottingham, Derbyshire and Derby), elected for the first time in May 2024.

Claire Ward is the incumbent; she was elected in May 2024.

The mayor is a member of the Mayoral Council for England and the Council of the Nations and Regions.

== Background ==
The Cities and Local Government Devolution Act 2016 introduced directly elected mayors for combined authorities. Combined authorities cover multiple local government areas. A combined authority covering Nottinghamshire and Derbyshire was first proposed in 2016. Some later proposals also included Leicestershire. Ultimately, the East Midlands Combined Authority included only Nottinghamshire and Derbyshire, covering the region of Nottinghamshire County Council, Nottingham City Council, Derbyshire County Council and Derby City Council. During consultation, a minority of respondents supported the introduction of a mayor for the region. The local authorities concerned voted to proceed with devolution plans, including the establishment of a directly elected mayor of the East Midlands, in March 2023.

Some politicians in Leicestershire expressed regret at being left out of the devolution deal, which had been opposed by Leicester City Council. The Centre for Cities said that even combining Derbyshire and Nottinghamshire was "a mistake" as "they are two different counties with distinct local economic needs".

== List of mayors ==
| Name | Term of office | | Elected | Political party |
|---|---|---|---|---|
| Claire Ward | 7 May 2024 | Incumbent | 2024 | Labour |

== See also ==
- Sheriff of Nottinghamshire, Derbyshire and the Royal Forests
- East Midlands region
