= John R. Hess =

American physician

John R. Hess is an American physician, focusing in blood coagulation, transfusion in trauma, and red blood cells, currently practicing at the University of Washington. His research involves both the development of better blood storage systems and hemorrhage control devices and the conduct of large human trials testing better ways to use blood products.

== Biography ==
Hess was raised in Spokane, Washington. He attended Washington State University through the Army ROTC program, then earned his medical doctorate from the University of Washington School of Medicine. Hess was called into service by the Army in 1973.

While fulfilling his military service obligations in Korea, Hess befriended Lee Jong-wook, whom he later sponsored as a Masters student at the University of Hawai'i.

Hess served as director of blood product development for the Army before accepting a position as director of transfusion services at the University of Maryland. Hess was later recruited to the University of Washington School of Medicine to develop its transfusion services, where he remained until his retirement in 2025.

Hess was a member of the WHO Expert Panel for Blood Transfusion Medicine from 2006‑2012.

== Education ==
- BA, General Studies, Washington State University, Pullman, WA, June 1963
- MD, University of Washington, Seattle, WA, June 1972
- Internship, Internal Medicine, Presbyterian‑University Hospital, Pittsburgh PA, June 1973
- MPH, University of Hawaii at Manoa, Honolulu, HI Dec 1979
- Fellowship, Adult Hematology and Medical Oncology, Fitzsimons Army Medical Center, Aurora, CO June 1982‑1985
