= 2024 East Midlands mayoral election =

- 2 May 2024
- Turnout: 27.5%
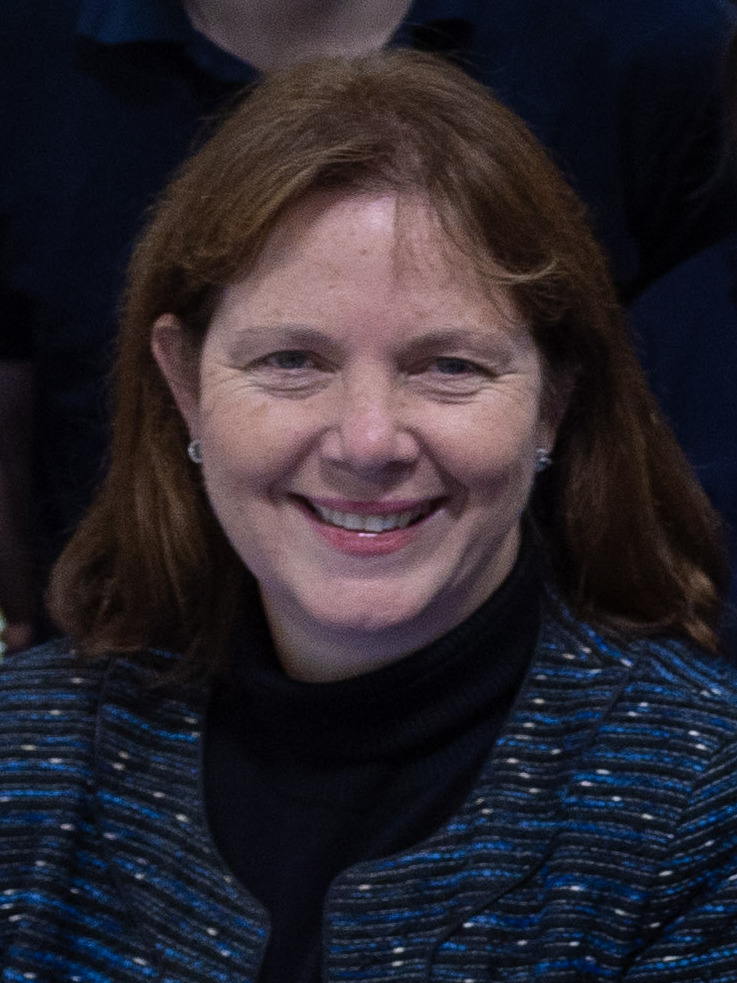

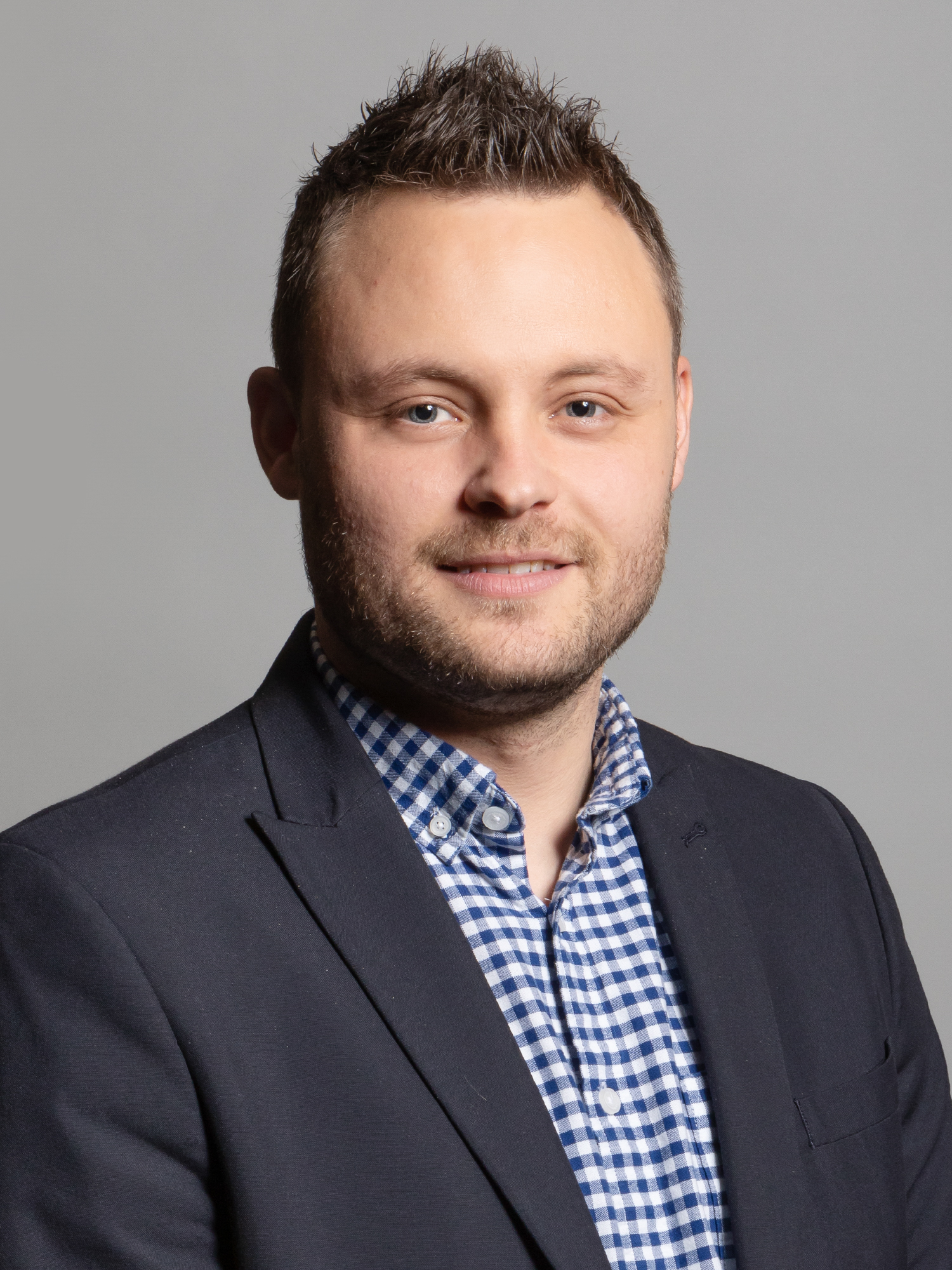

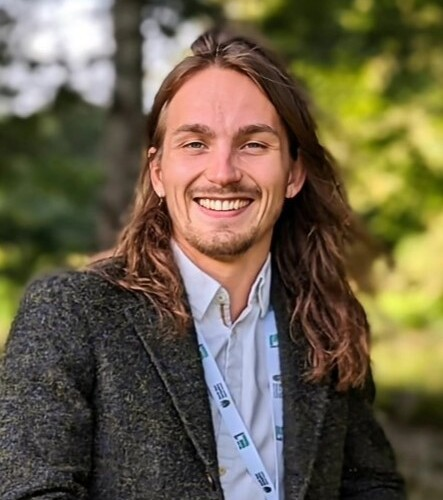
Candidate	Claire Ward	Ben Bradley	Frank Adlington-Stringer
Party	Labour Co-op	Conservative	Green
Popular vote	181,040	129,332	50,666
Percentage	40.3%	28.8%	11.3%
Candidate	Alan Graves	Matt Relf	Helen Tamblyn-Saville
Party	Reform	Independent	Liberal Democrats
Popular vote	49,201	23,359	15,970
Percentage	10.9%	5.2%	3.6%
- Election result by council areas
Elected mayor
Claire Ward
Labour Co-op

The 2024 East Midlands mayoral election was held on 2 May 2024 to elect the first mayor of the East Midlands. It was part of the local elections across England and Wales.

The election was won by the Labour Co-op candidate, Claire Ward.

== Background ==
The Cities and Local Government Devolution Act 2016 introduced directly elected mayors for combined authorities. Combined authorities cover multiple local government areas. A combined authority covering Nottinghamshire and Derbyshire was first proposed in 2016. Some later proposals also included Leicestershire. Ultimately, the East Midlands Combined Authority included only Nottinghamshire and Derbyshire, covering the region of Nottinghamshire County Council, Nottingham City Council, Derbyshire County Council and Derby City Council. During consultation, a minority of respondents supported the introduction of a mayor for the region. The local authorities concerned voted to proceed with devolution plans, including the establishment of a directly elected mayor of the East Midlands, in March 2023.

== Procedure ==
The election took place under first-past-the-post voting. Voters were able to vote for one candidate, and the candidate with the greatest numbers of votes became the mayor of the East Midlands.

== Campaign ==
The Conservative candidate Ben Bradley, the independent candidate Matt Relf and the Labour candidate Claire Ward all said they would fund the continuation of concessions for elderly and disabled tram passengers from the mayoral budget. Bradley was endorsed by the Nottingham Independents political party.

Labour Party candidate Clare Ward made commitments to launch a 'Visit East Midlands' campaign to encourage tourism, a Community Development Fund to regenerate high streets, a Mayor's Homelessness Task Force to lessen the amount of rough sleeping, and a Green Growth Fund to create new jobs in the East Midlands while lowering emissions. Other focuses would include improving transport in the area – including road resurfacing and integrated ticketing between services – and building more homes on brownfield sites.

Green Party candidate Frank Adlington-Stringer committed to a 'Green Industrial Revolution' which would include £16.8m into sustainable and affordable housing, training for job-seekers, and an overhaul of the public transport network with free travel for young people and a "London-style" ticketing system. He further committed to ending rough sleeping, bringing the bus network back into public control and negotiating reparations from the Government for the regional impacts of austerity. Adlington-Stringer committed to keeping the Mayors Office in Chesterfield, as well as to donating all of his salary beyond the average wage to charity.

== Candidate selection ==
=== Conservative Party ===
The Conservative Party selected the MP for Mansfield and Nottinghamshire council leader Ben Bradley as their candidate in September 2023.

The leader of Derbyshire County Council, Barry Lewis, unsuccessfully sought the Conservative nomination. Lewis said he would seek to support the manufacturing industry and oppose any proposals for ultra low-emission zone schemes.

=== Labour Party ===
Labour opened applications in May 2023. There were five candidates considered.

On 4 August 2023, the former MP Claire Ward was selected with 50.4% of the vote. Ward promised to build new affordable homes, integrate public transport and fund "thousands of new green jobs".

Nominated

- Claire Ward, former Member of Parliament for Watford (1997–2010) and government minister.

Lost nomination

- John Hess, former BBC journalist.
- Paddy Tipping, former Member of Parliament for Sherwood (1992–2010) and Nottinghamshire Police and Crime Commissioner (2012–21).

Not shortlisted

- Adele Williams, Nottingham City councillor.
- Suqie Banwait, Labour candidate from Matlock.

Labour East Midlands mayoral candidate selection
Candidate	Votes	%
Claire Ward		50.3%
Paddy Tipping		34.3%
John Hess		15.4%

=== Others ===
The Liberal Democrat candidate was Helen Tamblyn-Saville, a former district councillor who also stood in the 2019 general election in Bassetlaw constituency.

Alan Graves, the mayor of Derby, who has served as a councillor since 2002 for Labour, as an independent, for the UK Independence Party, the Brexit Party and Reform UK, was announced as the Reform UK candidate for mayor. He said he would try to get the role of mayor of the East Midlands abolished.

Matt Relf, an Ashfield Independents councillor, announced that he would run as an independent candidate, saying he could work with both Labour and Conservative councils.

The Green Party initially said they would not stand a candidate. However, in January 2024 the party invited nominations and on 10 February announced North East Derbyshire councillor Frank Adlington-Stringer as their candidate.

== Opinion polling ==
Dates conducted	Pollster	Client	Sample size	Ward Lab Co-op	Bradley Con	Graves Reform	Adlington-Stringer Green	Tamblyn-Saville Lib Dems	Relf Ind	Lead
2 May 2024	2024 election		–	40.3%	28.8%	10.9%	11.3%	3.6%	5.2%	11.5
19–24 Apr 2024	More in Common	N/A	2,029	41%	28%	14%	9%	4%	4%	13

== Results ==
2024 East Midlands mayoral election
Party	Candidate	Votes	%	±%
Labour Co-op	Claire Ward	181,040	40.3	N/A
Conservative	Ben Bradley	129,332	28.8	N/A
Green	Frank Adlington-Stringer	50,666	11.3	N/A
Reform	Alan Graves	49,201	10.9	N/A
Independent	Matt Relf	23,359	5.2	N/A
Liberal Democrats	Helen Tamblyn-Saville	15,970	3.6	N/A
Majority		51,708	11.5	N/A
Rejected ballots		2,858	0.64	
Turnout		449,568	27.5	N/A
