= Spatial development strategy =

A spatial development strategy is a strategic spatial planning document being introduced in England during 2026. They will be produced everywhere in England, by strategic authorities where they exist and elsewhere by strategic planning boards or other local authorities chosen by the UK government. Prior to the Planning and Infrastructure Act 2025, strategic planning had only taken place in Greater London and Greater Manchester. Local plans, produced by principal authorities, will continue to be made and must be in conformity with spatial development strategies.

== Background ==
Regional spatial strategies, covering English regions outside London, were withdrawn in 2010. Greater London has a spatial development strategy known as the London Plan and this continues to operate under existing Greater London Authority Act 1999 legislation. The Greater Manchester Combined Authority was a forerunner of spatial development strategies outside London and started producing a Greater Manchester Spatial Framework in 2014. However, the rules at time permitted any constituent council to veto the plan and this happened in 2020 when Stockport Council withdrew. The remaining nine boroughs produced a joint plan called Places for Everyone that was adopted in 2024.

== Implementation ==
Spatial development strategies are part of the Planning and Infrastructure Act 2025, although require secondary legislation to become active. In February 2026, the government consulted on areas for strategic planning authorities, that will each produce a spatial development strategy. Everywhere in England will be required to produce a spatial development strategy. The areas for strategies will include those of strategic authorities where they exist. Outside of these areas strategic planning boards covering multiple authorities will be created to make the plan, or the government can direct an existing local authority to produce one. Plans can be vetoed with a simple majority. Mayors, where they exist, have the casting vote. Local plans, the spatial strategies produced by principal local authorities, will continue to be made and must be in conformity with spatial development strategies. An update to the National Planning Policy Framework, consulted on in February 2026, showed that the strategies will be used to specify the number of homes that should be built in each constituent area.
