= Claire Ward =

British politician (born 1972)

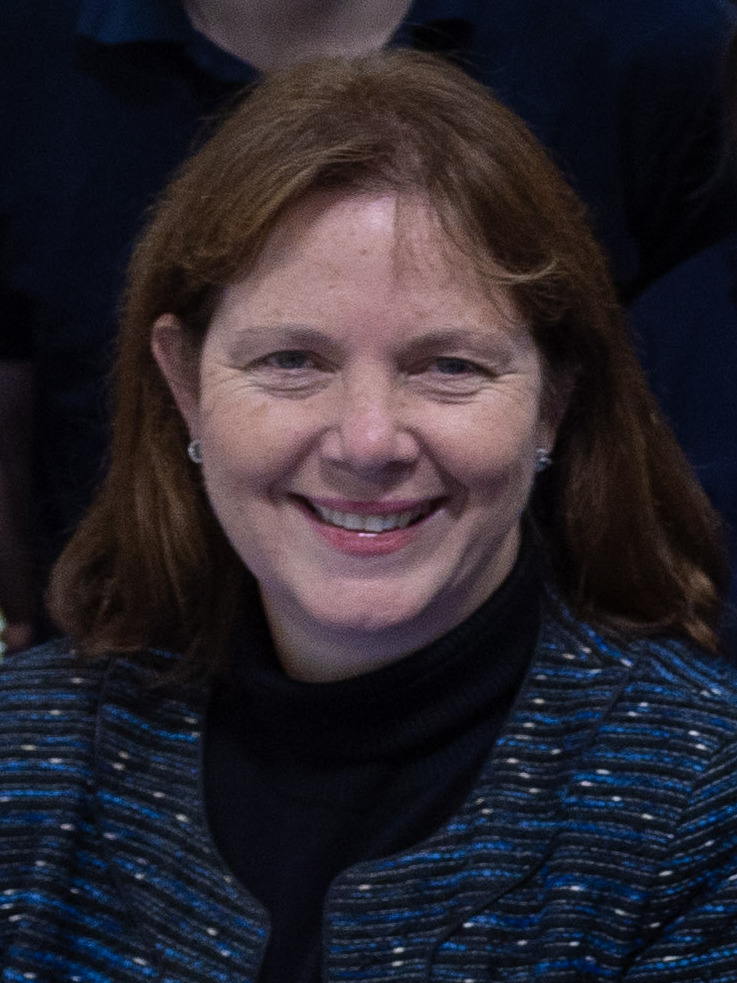
- Ward in 2024

Mayor of the East Midlands
- Incumbent
- Assumed office 7 May 2024
- Preceded by: Office established

Parliamentary Under-Secretary of State for Justice
- In office 9 June 2009 – 11 May 2010
- Prime Minister: Gordon Brown
- Preceded by: Shahid Malik; Maria Eagle
- Succeeded by: Crispin Blunt

Vice-Chamberlain of the Household
- In office 5 October 2008 – 9 June 2009
- Prime Minister: Gordon Brown
- Preceded by: Liz Blackman
- Succeeded by: Helen Jones

Member of Parliament for Watford
- In office 1 May 1997 – 12 April 2010
- Preceded by: Tristan Garel-Jones
- Succeeded by: Richard Harrington

Personal details
- Born: Claire Margaret Ward; 9 May 1972 (age 54) North Shields, Northumberland, England
- Party: Labour
- Education: University of Hertfordshire (LLB); Brunel University (MA); The College of Law (PgDip)
- Website: Official website

Claire Margaret Ward (born 9 May 1972) is a British Labour Party politician who has served as the strategic authority mayor for the East Midlands since May 2024. Previously, she served as Member of Parliament for Watford from 1997 to 2010. Ward was a Government Whip from 2005 to 2009 and a Justice Minister from 2009 to 2010.

== Early life and career ==
Ward was born in North Shields, Northumberland, the daughter of Frank and Cathy Ward. Both her parents were Labour Party councillors and her father stood unsuccessfully as the Labour candidate for Hertsmere at the 1987 general election. She was brought up in Borehamwood, Hertfordshire, where she attended the Loreto College, an all-girls Roman Catholic school in St Albans, and studied at the newly created University of Hertfordshire, graduating with a LLB (Law degree) in 1993. She then completed an MA on Britain and the European Union at Brunel University, before qualifying as a solicitor at the College of Law in London. From 1995 to 1998, she was a trainee solicitor.

Ward joined the Labour Party, the Co-operative Party and the Transport and General Workers' Union at the age of fifteen, becoming an active member of Young Labour. In 1990, she won the South East TUC Mike Perkins Memorial Award for Young Trade Unionists before being elected as the Youth Representative on Labour's National Executive Committee (NEC) the following year.

She was elected as a councillor for Elstree and Borehamwood Town Council in 1994, where she served as Mayor from 1996 to 1997. She stepped down from the Labour Party NEC in 1995 upon her selection as the party's candidate for Watford.

== Parliamentary career ==
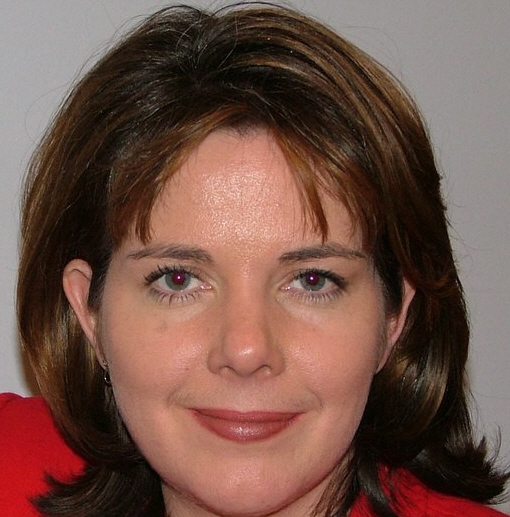
Labour Party photo of Ward

Ward became the MP for Watford at the 1997 general election, succeeding the former Conservative Party Deputy Chief Whip Tristan Garel-Jones, who had retired, and defeating Conservative candidate Robert Gordon by 5,792 votes. Elected at the age of 24, she was not quite the youngest MP, being a month older than Chris Leslie, the new MP for Shipley, although she was the youngest woman elected to the House of Commons. She was also the youngest female MP elected in the 2001 election.

Following her election, Ward became a member of the Culture, Media and Sport Select Committee. From 2000 to 2002, she was the Chairman of the All-Party Parliamentary Chocolate and Confectionery Industry Group. In the 2001 general election she retained her seat by 5,555 votes and was appointed as Parliamentary Private Secretary to John Hutton.

The increasing dominance of local politics in Watford Borough council by the Liberal Democrats, including the election of a Liberal Democrat mayor, led to speculation that Ward would find re-election extremely difficult; Ward even accused staff from the council of harassment during the 2005 general election campaign. However, she managed to hold off a strong Liberal Democrat challenge from Sal Brinton; despite a 12% swing against her, Ward held the seat with a majority of 1,148 votes (approximately 2.3%). The Conservative candidate was narrowly pushed into third place, with 793 fewer votes than Brinton, making Watford a three-way marginal seat.

Upon her re-election in May 2005, Ward was appointed an Assistant Government Whip before being promoted to full Whip, as a Lord Commissioner of HM Treasury, on 5 May 2006. She was promoted again in October 2008 to Vice-Chamberlain of the Household, the lowest of the senior Whips. At the June 2009 Cabinet reshuffle, she replaced Shahid Malik as the Parliamentary Under Secretary of State for Justice.

She claimed over £90,000 in second home allowance between 2004 and 2009, despite living less than 30 miles from Westminster. Upon publication of MPs' expenses in 2009, Ward defended her choice to fund a second home in Westminster from her parliamentary allowance, citing her need to balance her public duties with her duties as a mother of small children. Ward was one of 98 MPs who voted in favour of legislation which would have kept MPs' expense details secret.

Ward lost her seat at the 2010 general election, when she finished in third place with 14,750 votes, behind the successful Conservative Party candidate Richard Harrington (who received 19,291 votes) and the Liberal Democrat Sal Brinton (17,866 votes).

=== Voting record ===
The Labour Party was in Government throughout Ward's time in Parliament. As of the end of 2009, Ward had rebelled against the Government's stated or majority position 19 times out of 2,629 votes she attended, a rebelling rate of 0.72%. On occasion she voted against her party line on changes to the schedule of the House of Commons, and the Government's position on reform of the House of Lords. In 2004, she voted with the Conservatives in favour of introducing a ban on the "reasonable chastisement" of children. In 2008, on a free vote, Ward voted against her party's majority position on abortion, where she unsuccessfully voted in several separate bills for a reduction in the time when an abortion can be carried out from 24 weeks.

== Post-parliamentary career ==
From June 2011 until its closure in March 2015, Ward was executive director of the Independent Pharmacy Federation. In April 2015, Ward became the Chair of Pharmacy Voice, an association of trade bodies representing community pharmacy contractors. She resigned this role in April 2017 as part of the Pharmacy Voice's closure. Claire Ward was Chief Executive of the Institute for Collaborative Working from January 2019 to January 2022. She also continues roles in the pharmacy sector with the Pharmacists Defence Association and as Chair of Sigma Pharmaceuticals Annual Conference. She has been a Governor of the University of Hertfordshire since September 2018. She became a Non Executive Director of Sherwood Forest Hospitals NHS Foundation Trust in May 2013 and was appointed chair in October 2021.

== Mayor of the East Midlands ==
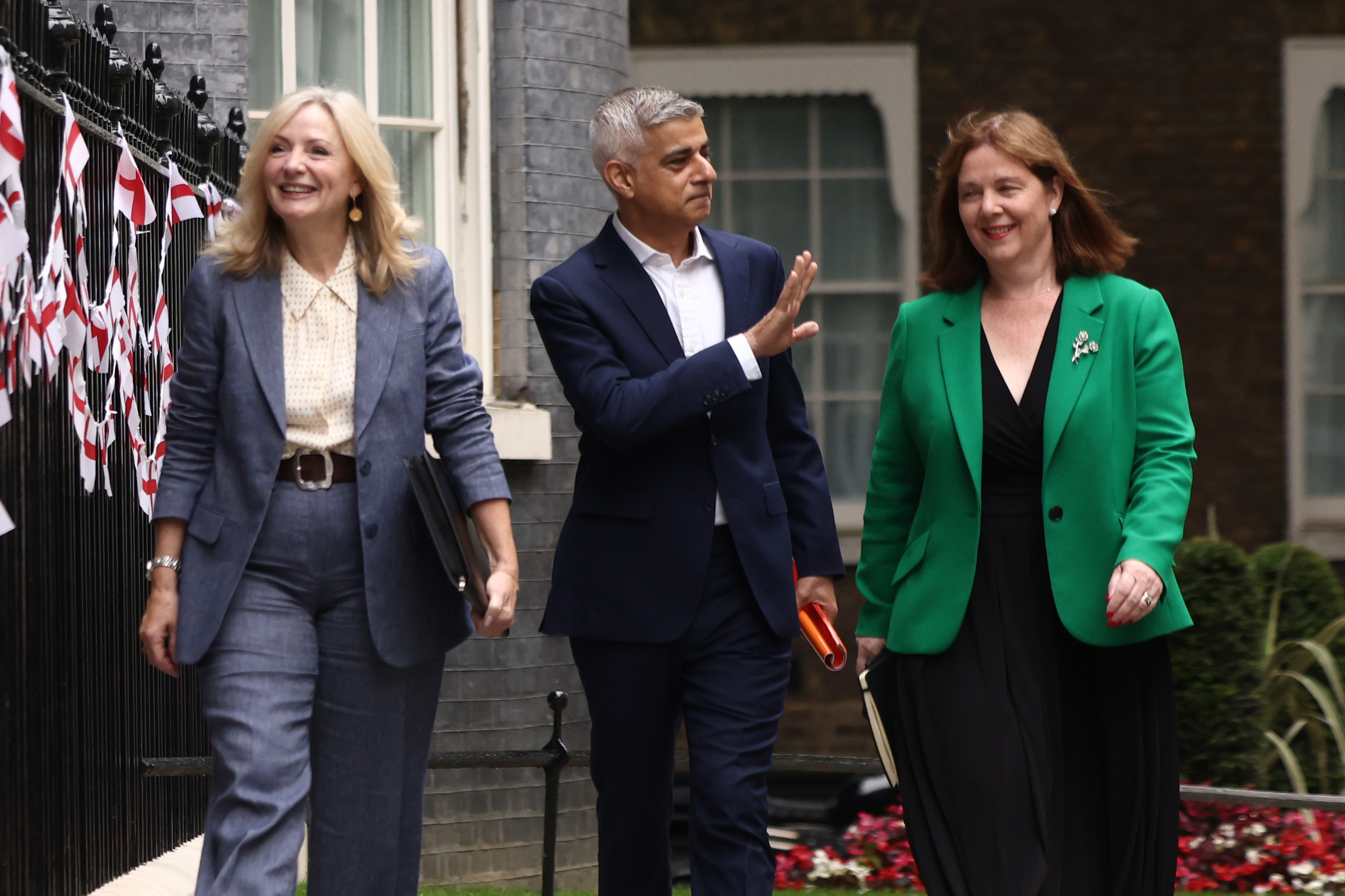
Ward (right), with fellow metro mayors, Sadiq Khan and Tracy Brabin, on a visit to 10 Downing Street

In August 2023, she was selected as Labour and Co-operative candidate to be the first mayor in the 2024 East Midlands mayoral election. In May 2024 she was elected to this position.

She subsequently announced that she would stand down as chair of the Hospitals Trust. At the same time, she said her first few months would involve building partnerships with those who could help her make changes over her massive region, using the £1.14 billion devolution deal covering 30 years, for transport, housing, skills, education, the economy and net-zero strategy in the huge East Midlands region. 'We have been massively underfunded and under-invested in as a region, and it is really important we take those new powers and that funding from Westminster, we bring it in to this region and we decide our own priorities.'

== Family life ==
When she was aged 28, Claire Ward met John Simpson, a plumber four years older than her, with his own business in Wembley, at a birthday party in Watford. They announced their engagement two years later. She married in 2003, and her first child, in 2005, was stillborn. She has subsequently had two further children.

Parliament of the United Kingdom
Preceded by Tristan Garel-Jones	Member of Parliament for Watford; 1997–2010	Succeeded by Richard Harrington
Political offices
Preceded by Liz Blackman	Vice-Chamberlain of the Household; 2008–2009	Succeeded by Helen Jones
Preceded by Shahid Malik	Parliamentary Under Secretary of State for Justice; 2009–2010	Succeeded by Crispin Blunt; Jonathan Djanogly
Preceded by Office established	Mayor of the East Midlands; 2024–present	Succeeded by Incumbent
Party political offices
Preceded by Alun Parry	Youth representative on the National Executive Committee of the Labour Party; 1992–1995	Succeeded by Catherine Taylor
