= Chesterfield Town Hall =

Municipal building in Derbyshire, England

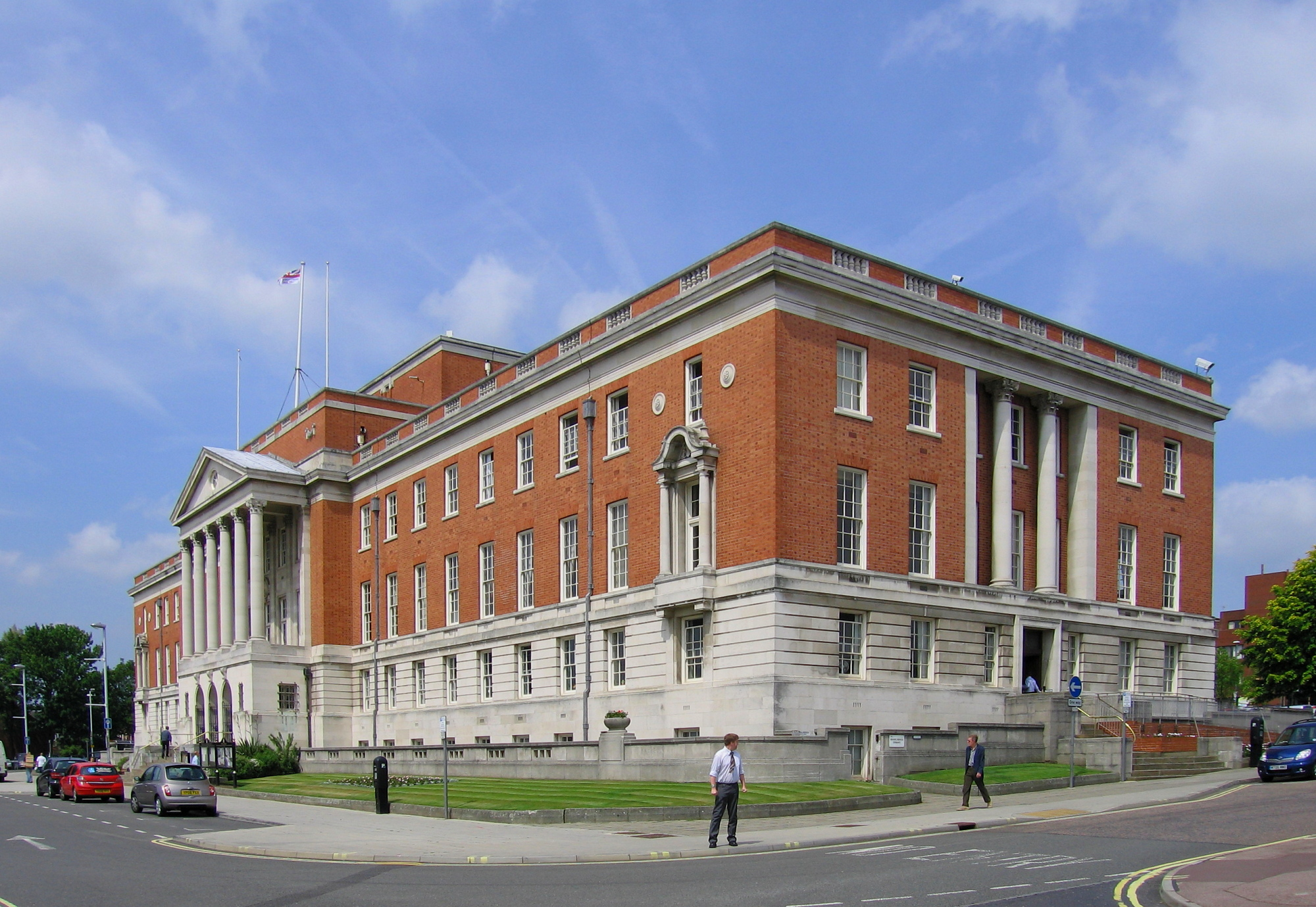
- Chesterfield Town Hall

- Shown in Derbyshire
- 53.2368°N 1.4323°W
- Location: Rose Hill, Chesterfield

History
- Built: 1938

Site notes
- Area: Derbyshire
- Architect: Bradshaw Gass & Hope
- Architectural style: Neo-Georgian style

Listed Building – Grade II
- Official name: Chesterfield Town Hall
- Designated: 30 March 1999
- Reference no.: 1113305

Chesterfield Town Hall is a municipal building on Rose Hill, Chesterfield, Derbyshire, England. It is a Grade II listed building.

== History ==
An 18th century town hall was designed by a Mr. Carr of York and erected in the Market Place in 1790. In the second half of 19th century the borough council met in a cramped municipal hall on the corner of Beetwell Street and South Street. Chesterfield Corporation acquired the Stephenson Memorial Hall in 1889 and proceeded to create a more spacious council chamber by converting the lecture hall for use by the councillors in 1905. An inquiry in a serious explosion at Grassmoor Colliery, which led to the deaths of 14 miners, was held in the council chamber in the Stephenson Memorial Hall in December 1933.

A purpose-built facility on Rose Hill, which was designed by Bradshaw Gass & Hope in the Neo-Georgian style and built by Robert Carlyle Co of Manchester, was officially opened by Evelyn Cavendish, Duchess of Devonshire on 6 April 1938. The sculptural decoration on the outside of the building was undertaken by Frank Tory and Sons while the interior decoration involved extensive use of walnut panelling and the rooms were given an Egyptian theme to them; the ceilings were richly decorated with lotus flowers.

A war memorial and some urns, terraces and steps which had been designed by Bradshaw Gass & Hope as part of the formal approach to the town hall was unveiled by the Andrew Cavendish, 11th Duke of Devonshire on 8 May 1954. The building, which had served as the meeting place of Borough of Chesterfield continued to be the local seat of government after enlargement of the council's area in 1974.

An extensive refurbishment, at a cost of £2.7 million, was completed in autumn 2018. Through the removal of interior walls, the works created extra space which enabled the Derbyshire Register Office and other public sector organisations to be accommodated in the building. Works of art in the town hall include a portrait by Henry William Pickersgill of Richard Arkwright.
