= Non-metropolitan county =

County-level entity in England

- Also known as: Shire county
- Non-metropolitan counties
- Category: Counties
- Location: England
- Found in: Regions; Strategic authority areas
- Created by: Local Government Act 1972
- Created: 1 April 1974
- Number: 78 (as of 1 April 2023)
- Possible types: Two-tier (21); Single-tier unitary authority (56) (Note: There are 62 unitary authority areas in total, but six of them (in Berkshire) are not counties); Royal county of 6 single-tier unitary authorities (1)
- Possible status: Borough; City; Royal county
- Populations: 300,000–1,400,000
- Subdivisions: Non-metropolitan district

A non-metropolitan county, or colloquially, shire county, is a subdivision of England used for local government.

The non-metropolitan counties were originally created in 1974 as part of a reform of local government in England and Wales, and were the top tier of a two-tier system of counties and districts. 21 non-metropolitan counties still use a two-tier system; 56 are unitary authorities, in which the functions of a county and district council have been combined in a single body. Berkshire has a unique structure.

Non-metropolitan counties cover the majority of England with the exception of Greater London, the Isles of Scilly, and the six metropolitan counties: Greater Manchester, Merseyside, South Yorkshire, Tyne and Wear, West Midlands and West Yorkshire.

The non-metropolitan counties are all part of ceremonial counties. Some ceremonial counties, such as Norfolk, contain a single non-metropolitan county, but many contain more than one and it is also common for ceremonial counties and non-metropolitan counties to share a name. Lancashire, for example, contains the non-metropolitan counties of Lancashire, Blackpool, and Blackburn with Darwen.

== Origins ==
Prior to 1974 local government had been divided between single-tier county boroughs (the largest towns and cities) and two-tier administrative counties which were subdivided into municipal boroughs and urban and rural districts. The Local Government Act 1972, which came into effect on 1 April 1974, divided England outside Greater London and the six largest conurbations into thirty-nine non-metropolitan counties. Each county was divided into anywhere between two and fourteen non-metropolitan districts. There was a uniform two-tier system of local government with county councils dealing with "wide-area" services such as education, fire services and the police, and district councils exercising more local powers over areas such as planning, housing and refuse collection.

Service	Two-tier		Unitary authority
Service	Non-metropolitan county	Non-metropolitan district	Unitary authority
Education	Yes	No	Yes
Transport	Yes	No	Yes
Housing	No	Yes	Yes
Planning	Yes (Note: Planning authority for minerals, waste and county council developments)	Yes	Yes
Planning applications	No	Yes	Yes
Fire and public safety	Yes	No	Yes
Social care	Yes	No	Yes
Libraries	Yes	No	Yes
Waste management	Yes	No	Yes
Rubbish collection	No	Yes	Yes
Recycling	No	Yes	Yes
Trading standards	Yes	No	Yes
Council Tax collections	No	Yes	Yes

As originally constituted, the non-metropolitan counties were largely based on existing counties, although they did include a number of innovations. Some counties were based on areas surrounding large county boroughs or were formed by the mergers of smaller counties. Examples of the first category are Avon (based on Bath and Bristol) and Cleveland (based on Teesside). An example of the second category is Cumbria, formed by the merger between Cumberland and Westmorland. The counties were adopted for all statutory purposes: a lord-lieutenant and high sheriff was appointed to each county, and they were also used for judicial administration, and definition of police force areas. The Royal Mail adopted the counties for postal purposes in most areas.

== Changes ==
=== 1995–1998 ===
A Local Government Commission was appointed in 1992 to review the administrative structure of the non-metropolitan counties. It was anticipated that a system of unitary authorities would entirely replace the two-tier system. The Commission faced competing claims from former county boroughs wishing to regain unitary status and advocates for the restoration of such small counties as Herefordshire and Rutland. The review led to the introduction of unitary local government in some areas but not in others. In the majority of unitary authorities an existing district council took over powers from the county council. The 1972 Act required that all areas outside Greater London form part of a non-metropolitan county, and that all such counties should contain at least one district. Accordingly, the statutory instruments that effected the reorganisation separated the unitary districts from the county in which they were situated and constituted them as counties. The orders also provided that the provisions of the 1972 Act that every county should have a county council should not apply in the new counties, with the district council exercising the powers of the county council.

An exception was made in the case of Berkshire, which was retained with its existing boundaries in spite of the abolition of its county council and the creation of six unitary authorities. This was done in order to preserve its status as a royal county.

With the creation of numerous new non-metropolitan counties, the areas used for lieutenancy and shrievalty began to diverge from local government areas. This led to the development of ceremonial counties for these purposes, a fact recognised by the Lieutenancies Act 1997.

=== 2009 ===
A further wave of unitary authorities were created in 2009 under the terms of the Local Government and Public Involvement in Health Act 2007. While a number of new counties were created, several of the new authorities (such as Cornwall or Northumberland) continued to have the boundaries set in 1974.

=== 2019–2023 ===
The 2019–2023 structural changes to local government in England have involved changes to the non-metropolitan county of Dorset (2019), and the abolition of the non-metropolitan counties Northamptonshire (2021) and Cumbria (2023). In addition, the non-metropolitan counties of Buckinghamshire (2020), North Yorkshire (2023), and Somerset (2023) are unchanged, but their councils became unitary authorities as the existing non-metropolitan districts in these areas were consolidated and the district councils abolished.

== List of non-metropolitan counties ==
The following list shows the original thirty-nine counties formed in 1974, subsequent changes in the 1990s, and further changes since then.

Current
Planned abolition
Abolished non-metropolitan county
Abolished non-metropolitan county and associated ceremonial county

Non-metropolitan county 1974	Changes 1995–1998	Changes 2009	Changes 2019 and 2020s
Avon (6 districts) (Note: Avon, as a non-metropolitan county, was abolished in 1996, in accordance with Avon (Structural Change) Order 1995.)	1996: North West Somerset (unitary); 2005: Renamed North Somerset (Note: The name of the non-metropolitan district and district council was changed to "North Somerset" by resolution of the council 11 July 1995. However this did not change the name of the county which had the same area. The Local Government Changes for England (Miscellaneous Provision) Regulations 1995 gave district councils in a "county for which there is no county council and in which there is not more than one district" the additional power to change the name of the county. This was, however, not done until 2005.)	None	None
Avon (6 districts)	1996: Bath and North East Somerset (unitary)	None	None
Avon (6 districts)	1996: South Gloucestershire (unitary)	None	None
Avon (6 districts)	1996: City of Bristol (unitary)	None	None
Bedfordshire (4 districts)	1997: Bedfordshire (3 districts)	Bedford (unitary)	None
Bedfordshire (4 districts)	1997: Bedfordshire (3 districts)	Central Bedfordshire (unitary)	None
Bedfordshire (4 districts)	1997: Luton (unitary)	None	None
Berkshire (Royal County) (6 districts)	1998: The county council was abolished, with each of the six district councils in the county becoming unitary authorities. The Royal County of Berkshire was not abolished.	None	None
Buckinghamshire (5 districts)	1997: Buckinghamshire (4 districts)	None	2020: Buckinghamshire (unitary)
Buckinghamshire (5 districts)	1997: Milton Keynes (unitary)	None	None
Cambridgeshire (6 districts)	1998: Cambridgeshire (5 districts)	None	None
Cambridgeshire (6 districts)	1998: Peterborough (unitary)	None	
Cheshire (8 districts)	1998: Cheshire (6 districts)	Cheshire East (unitary)	None
Cheshire (8 districts)	1998: Cheshire (6 districts)	Cheshire West and Chester (unitary)	None
Cheshire (8 districts)	1998: Halton (unitary)	None	None
Cheshire (8 districts)	1998: Warrington (unitary)	None	None
Cleveland (4 districts)	1996: Hartlepool (unitary)	None	None
Cleveland (4 districts)	1996: Middlesbrough (unitary)	None	None
Cleveland (4 districts)	1996: Redcar and Cleveland (unitary)	None	None
Cleveland (4 districts)	1996: Stockton-on-Tees (unitary)	None	None
Cornwall (6 districts)	None	Became unitary	None
Cumbria (6 districts)	None	None	2023: Cumberland (unitary)
Cumbria (6 districts)	None	None	2023: Westmorland and Furness (unitary)
Derbyshire (9 districts)	1997: Derby (unitary)	None	None
Derbyshire (9 districts)	1997: Derbyshire (8 districts)	None	None
Devon (10 districts)	1998: Devon (8 districts)	None	None
Devon (10 districts)	1998: Torbay (unitary)	None	None
Devon (10 districts)	1998: Plymouth (unitary)	None	None
Dorset (8 districts)	1997: Dorset (6 districts)	None	2019: Dorset (a unitary from 5 districts)
Dorset (8 districts)	1997: Bournemouth (unitary)	None	2019: Bournemouth, Christchurch and Poole (unitary from 2 unitaries and Christchurch district)
Dorset (8 districts)	1997: Poole (unitary)	None	2019: Bournemouth, Christchurch and Poole (unitary from 2 unitaries and Christchurch district)
Durham (8 districts)	1997: Durham (7 districts)	Became unitary	None
Durham (8 districts)	1997: Darlington (unitary)	None	None
East Sussex (7 districts)	1997: East Sussex (5 districts)	None	None
East Sussex (7 districts)	1997: Brighton and Hove (unitary)	None	None
Essex (14 districts)	1998: Essex (12 districts)	None	None
Essex (14 districts)	1998: Southend-on-Sea (unitary)	None	None
Essex (14 districts)	1998: Thurrock (unitary)	None	None
Gloucestershire (6 districts)	None	None	None
Hampshire (13 districts)	1997: Hampshire (11 districts)	None	None
Hampshire (13 districts)	1997: Portsmouth (unitary)	None	None
Hampshire (13 districts)	1997: Southampton (unitary)	None	None
Hereford and Worcester (9 districts)	1998: Herefordshire (unitary)	None	None
Hereford and Worcester (9 districts)	1998: Worcestershire (6 districts)	None	None
Hertfordshire (10 districts)	None	None	None
Humberside (9 districts)	1996: East Riding of Yorkshire (unitary)	None	None
Humberside (9 districts)	1996: City of Kingston upon Hull (unitary)	None	None
Humberside (9 districts)	1996: North Lincolnshire (unitary)	None	None
Humberside (9 districts)	1996: North East Lincolnshire (unitary)	None	None
Isle of Wight (2 districts)	1995: Became unitary	None	None
Kent (14 districts)	1998: Kent (12 districts)	None	None
Kent (14 districts)	1998: The Medway Towns (unitary); 1998: renamed Medway	None	None
Lancashire (14 districts)	1998: Lancashire (12 districts)	None	None
Lancashire (14 districts)	1998: Blackburn with Darwen (unitary)	None	None
Lancashire (14 districts)	1998: Blackpool (unitary)	None	None
Leicestershire (9 districts)	1997: Leicestershire (7 districts)	None	None
Leicestershire (9 districts)	1997: Leicester (unitary)	None	None
Leicestershire (9 districts)	1997: Rutland (unitary)	None	None
Lincolnshire (7 districts)	None	None	None
Norfolk (7 districts)	None	None	None
North Yorkshire (8 districts)	1996: North Yorkshire (7 districts)	None	2023: North Yorkshire (unitary)
North Yorkshire (8 districts)	1996: York (unitary)	None	None
Northamptonshire (7 districts)	None	None	2021: North Northamptonshire (unitary)
Northamptonshire (7 districts)	None	None	2021: West Northamptonshire (unitary)
Northumberland (6 districts)	None	Became unitary	None
Nottinghamshire (8 districts)	1998: Nottinghamshire (7 districts)	None	None
Nottinghamshire (8 districts)	1998: Nottingham (unitary)	None	None
Oxfordshire (5 districts)	None	None	None
Salop (6 districts) 1980: renamed Shropshire	1998: Shropshire (5 districts)	Became unitary	None
Salop (6 districts) 1980: renamed Shropshire	1998: The Wrekin (unitary) 1998: Renamed Telford and Wrekin	None	None
Somerset (5 districts)	None	None	2019: Somerset (4 districts through merger); 2023: Somerset (unitary)
Staffordshire (9 districts)	1997: Staffordshire (8 districts)	None	None
Staffordshire (9 districts)	1997: Stoke-on-Trent (unitary)	None	None
Suffolk (7 districts)	None	None	2019: Suffolk (5 districts through mergers)
Surrey (11 districts)	None	None	2027: East Surrey (unitary)
Surrey (11 districts)	None	None	2027: West Surrey (unitary)
Warwickshire (5 districts)	None	None	None
West Sussex (7 districts)	None	None	None
Wiltshire (5 districts)	1997: Wiltshire (4 districts)	Became unitary	None
Wiltshire (5 districts)	1997: Thamesdown (unitary); 1997: Renamed Swindon	None	None

== Wales ==
In Wales there was no distinction between metropolitan and non-metropolitan counties: all upper tier areas were designated "counties". The Local Government (Wales) Act 1994 amended the 1972 Act, abolishing the Welsh counties and creating instead new Welsh principal areas, some of which are also designated "counties". For the purposes of lieutenancy the counties constituted in 1974 were preserved.

== See also ==
- ISO 3166-2:GB, subdivision codes for the United Kingdom
- Political make-up of local councils in the United Kingdom#County councils
