= Centre for Cities =

UK non-partisan research unit and charity

- Predecessor: IPPR
- Formation: March 2005; 21 years ago
- Registration no.: Charity 1119841; Company 06215397
- Headquarters: 9 Holyrood Street, 2nd Floor, London, England, SE1 2EL
- Budget: £1.4 million (2018)
- Revenue: £1.4 million (2018)
- Website: www.centreforcities.org

The Centre for Cities is an independent, non-partisan urban policy research unit and a charity registered in England. The Centre's main goal is to understand how and why economic growth and change takes place in the United Kingdom's cities.

== History ==
The Centre for Cities was launched in March 2005 as part of IPPR and became independent in November 2007.

Since 2017, Andrew Carter has been the CEO for Centre for Cities. With his 20 years of experience in urban economic policies for public and private developers.

== Research ==
The Centre produces an annual Cities Outlook report assessing the economic performance of the 64 largest towns and cities in the United Kingdom. From 2016 onwards the Centre for Cities reevaluated its methodology for defining primary urban areas, based on this it now recognises 63 primary urban areas in the UK:

- Grimsby and Hastings removed
- Basildon, Exeter and Slough added
- Bolton and Rochdale merged with the Manchester primary urban area.

The Centre has undertaken work for the All Party Urban Development Group, an All-party parliamentary group. In 2018, the Centre released a report challenging the Government's approach to improving UK business productivity. They suggest that the Government should focus on the UK's weaker regions to attract more productive exporters, and not just focus on the UK's least productive companies in general.

== Funding ==
In November 2022, the funding transparency website Who Funds You? gave Centre for Cities a B grade (rating goes from A to E).
