= Arriva Derby =

Bus operator in Derbyshire

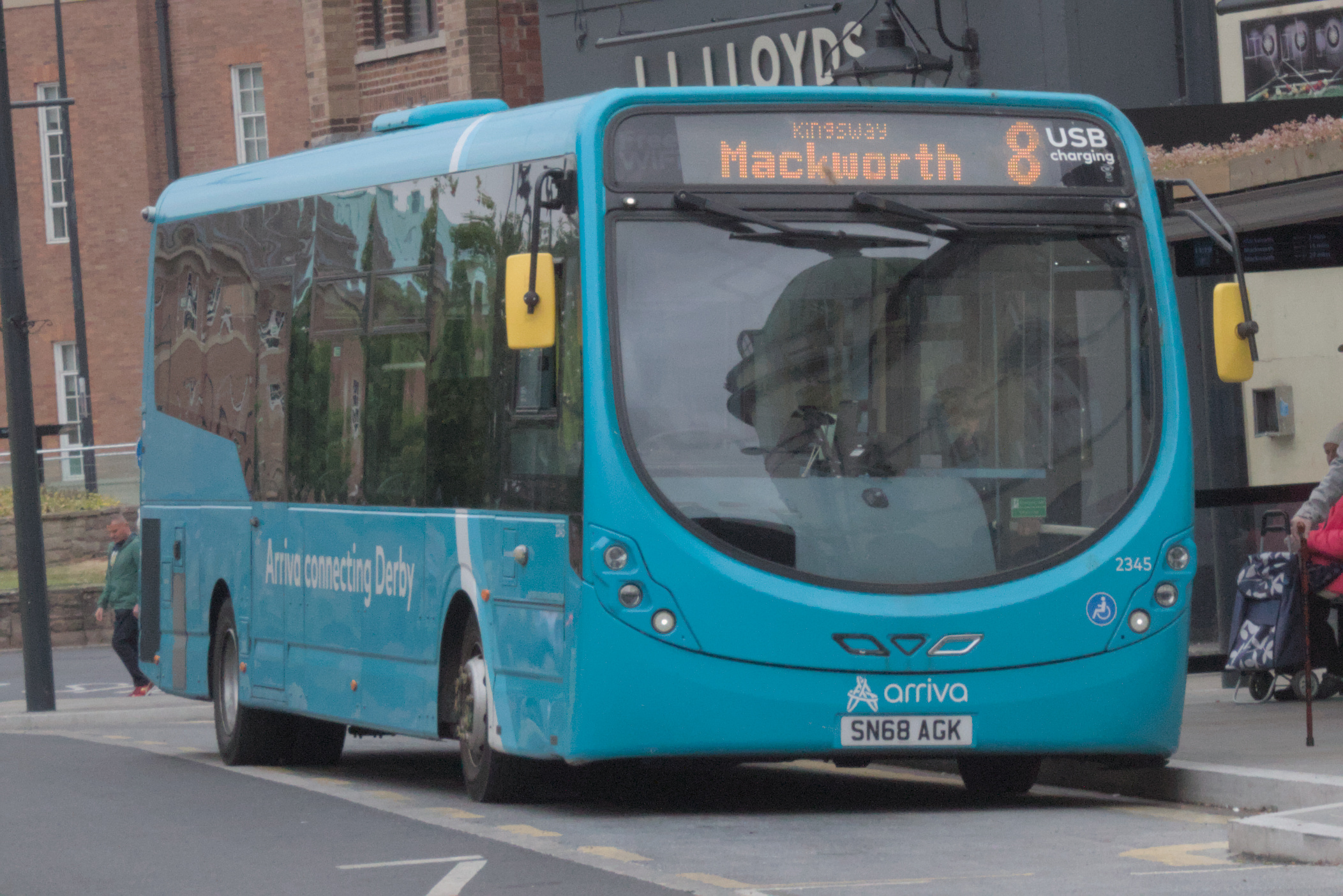
- Wright StreetLite on Albert Street, Derby, in May 2025
- Parent: Arriva
- Founded: November 1880; 145 years ago (as Derby Tramways Company)
- Headquarters: Derby
- Service area: Derbyshire
- Service type: Bus services
- Hubs: Derby bus station
- Depots: 1
- Fleet: 92 (June 2025)
- Chief executive: Simon Mathieson
- Website: www.arrivabus.co.uk/midlands/bus-travel-in-derby

Arriva Derby is a bus operator in Derby. It is a subsidiary of Arriva Midlands.

== History ==
=== Derby City Transport ===
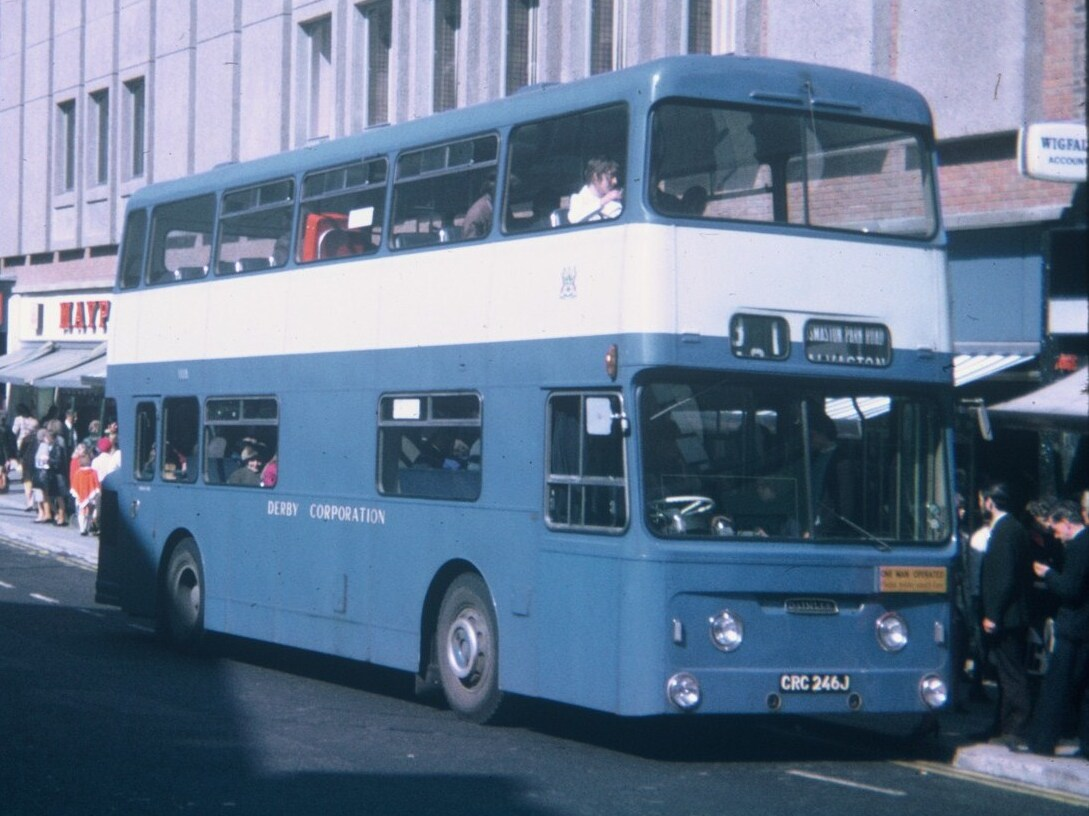
Derby Corporation Roe bodied Daimler Fleetline on Cornmarket in May 1971

In March 1880, the Derby Tramways Company commenced operating horse-drawn trams between Market Place and Derby railway station. The Derby Corporation Tramways, &c. Act 1899 (62 & 63 Vict. c. cxciii) saw the Derby Corporation take over the tram lines in November 1899. Between 1903 and 1907 the network was extended and electrified.

In May 1917, a Tilling-Stevens petrol-electric bus entered service. A second entered service in 1920, but both were replaced with motor buses in 1924. Between January 1932 and July 1934, Derby's trams were replaced by trolleybuses. Motor buses continued to operate alongside the trolleybuses until the network began to be closed in the 1960s, with the last running on 9 September 1967.

In December 1973, Derby Corporation purchased Blue Bus Services of Willington. In 1974, Derby Corporation was renamed Derby Borough Transport and later became Derby City Transport when Derby was granted city status in 1977.

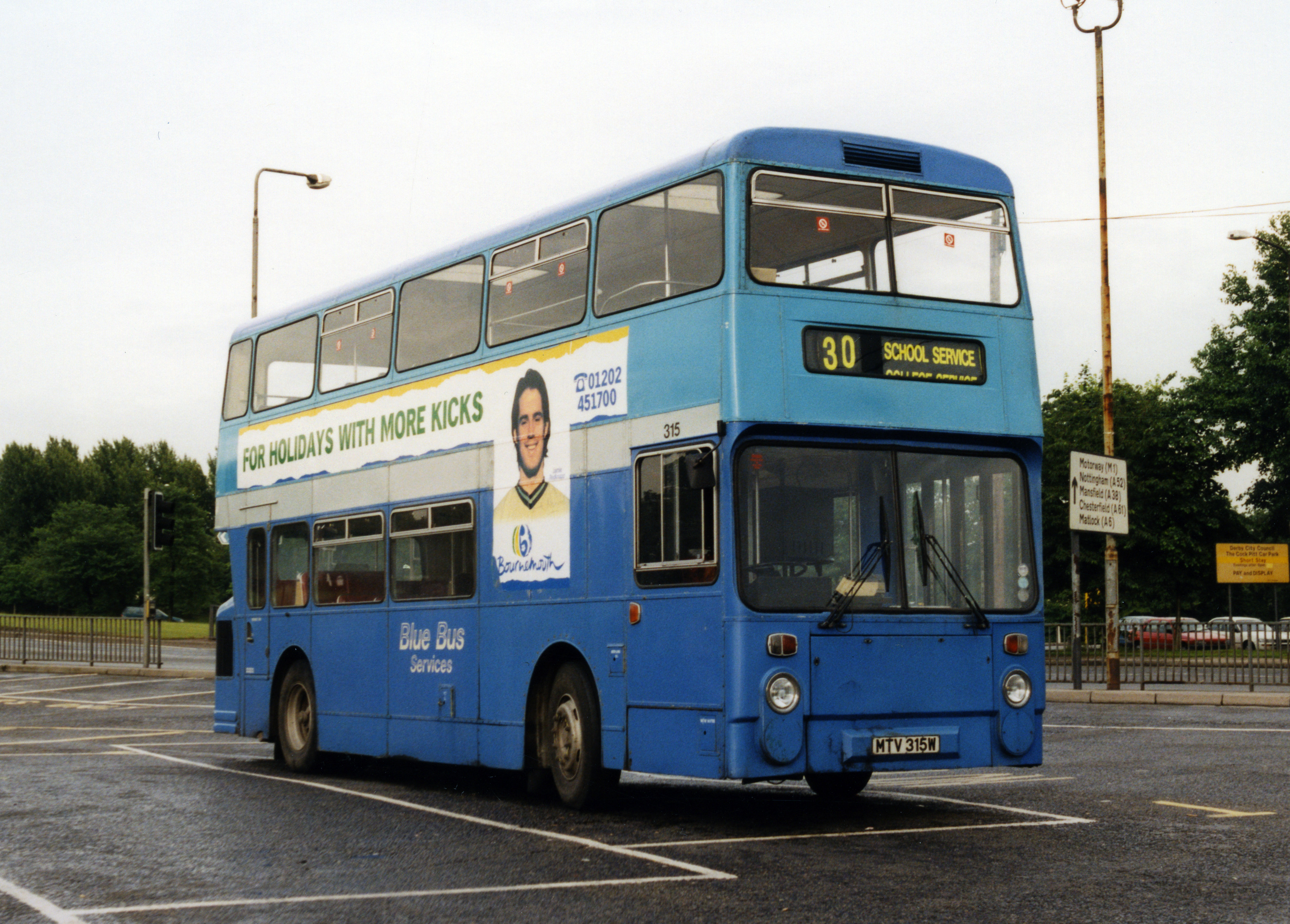
Blue Bus Services Northern Counties bodied Leyland Fleetline in 1997

To comply with the Transport Act 1985 and ensuing deregulation of bus services from 26 October 1986, the assets of Derby City Transport were transferred to a new legal entity, Derby City Transport Limited, in October 1986. Following deregulation, Derby City Transport Limited was placed up for sale by Derby City Council in January 1989, and in the intervening period, saw minibus competition from Midland Red North, formed from the split of National Bus Company subsidiary Midland Red and operating locally under the 'Mercian' brand.

Following six months of negotiations between Derby City Council and company employees, Derby City Transport was sold for over £3 million (equivalent to £7,938,000 in 2025) in July 1989 to a consortium consisting 75% of an employee buyout team and 25% Luton & District, beating a management buyout bid as well as interest from Trent Buses, Midland Red, Stevensons of Uttoxeter and Go-Ahead Northern.

Derby City Transport took over competitor Camms of Nottingham's bus operations in 1993 after the latter decided to return solely to coaching work, altering the timings of Camms services in Derby to reduce duplication as well as moving 15 buses from Derby to Nottingham in order to operate Camms' school and local authority contract services. Having revived the Blue Bus Services name for the company's coaching arm in 1984, Derby City Transport adopted the Blue Bus name for the entire bus fleet in January 1994, with buses being painted into a two-tone blue livery with white striping.

=== Arriva ownership ===
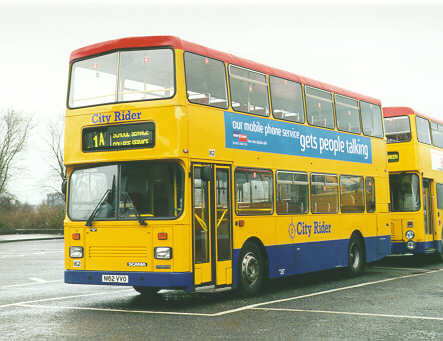
City Rider East Lancs E Type bodied Scania N113DRB in 1997

In July 1994, Derby City Transport was sold to British Bus, who by then had gained a 25% stake in the company through their earlier purchase of Luton & District. In 1995, Derby City Transport's Blue Bus identity was replaced by a new City Rider brand, with new Scania N113DRB double-decker buses and Mercedes-Benz 711D minibuses adopting a yellow, red and blue livery, drivers being issued with new uniforms matching the livery, and more frequent bus services being operated.

In August 1996, British Bus was purchased by the Cowie Group. A year later in November 1997, Cowie rebranded to Arriva and adopted a corporate aquamarine and cream livery; Derby City Transport was accordingly rebranded to Arriva Derby, with a fleet of new Plaxton Pointer bodied Dennis Dart SLFs being among the first new vehicles within the group delivered in the new livery.

In November 2024, the Arriva Derby depot was crowned Top National Depot at the UK Bus Awards.

== Services ==
Arriva operate the following services in Derby (as of April 2026)

· 1A - Derby > Derby Midland Station > Wilmorton > Alvaston anticlockwise circular

· 1B - Derby > Pride Park > Wilmorton > Alvaston > Thulston > Buttercup Leys > Chellaston > Boulton Moor (some morning journeys and afternoon journeys operate through Wyvern Business Park, replacing former route 'The Wyvern'. Morning journeys through Wyvern Business park run so outbound and afternoon journeys run so inbound)

· 1C - Derby > Derby Midland Station > Wilmorton > Alvaston clockwise circular

· 2 - Derby > Rose Hill > Osmaston > Allenton > Shelton Lock > Chellaston then onto Royal Glen Park or Chellaston Fields or Swarkestone > Melbourne > Ticknall > Hartshorne > Woodville > Swadlincote

· 2A - Derby > Rose Hill > Osmaston > Allenton > Shelton Lock > Chellaston

· 4 - Derby > Normanton > Pear Tree > Osmaston > Allenton > Alvaston

· 5 - Derby > California > St Lukes > Royal Derby Hospital > Littleover > Sunnyhill > Normanton > Derby

· 5A - Derby > Normanton > Sunnyhill > Littleover > Royal Derby Hospital > St Lukes > California > Derby

· 6 - Derby > Normanton > Sunnyhill > Sinfin Asda

· 7 - Derby > Normanton > Sunnyhill (via Stenson Road and Oaklands Avenue) > Sinfin Asda

· 8 - Derby > New Zealand > Mackworth Estate anticlockwise circular

· 20 - Derby > Chaddesden > Spondon anticlockwise circular

· 22 - Derby > Chaddesden > Oakwood anticlockwise circular (via Breadsall Hilltop)

· 24 - Derby > Chaddesden > Oakwood clockwise circular (via Breadsall Hilltop)

· 26 - Derby > Chaddesden > Oakwood clockwise circular

· 38 - Derby > Rose Hill > Normanton > Pear Tree > Sinfin > Stenson Fields anticlockwise circular

· X38 - Derby > Royal Derby Hospital > Clay Mills > Wetmore > Burton-upon-Trent town centre anticlockwise circular

== Fleet ==
Arriva Derby currently have a fleet of 82 vehicles as of 28th October 2026. These include:

- 1 Mercedes-Benz Sprinter City 45
- 5 ADL Enviro400s (used for service 38 but can also be found on 1A, 1B and 1C sometimes during the week)
- 22 VDL SB200 Wright Pulsar 2 (used mainly on routes 2, 2A, 4, 20, 22, 24, 26 and X38)
- 4 VDL SB200 Wright Pulsar (used on same routes as Wright Pulsar 2s)
- 13 ADL Enviro400 MMCs (used for Hopperbus services or sometimes as spares (unbranded one [YY67 HDK] used on any route that is suitable for Double-Deeckers)), more E400mmcs were transferred from Leicester depot, and are used on routes 1A, 1B, 1C and 38
- 12 ADL Enviro200 MMCs
- 5 Volvo B9TL Wright Eclipse Gemini (used mainly on services 1A, 1B, 1C and 38)
- 19 Wright Streetlite DFs (used mainly for services 5, 5A, 6, 7 and 8 but can also be found on other single deck services sometimes, and are always used for 38 on Sundays)
- 1 Mercedes-Benz Citaro O530 (used for Driver Training)

On 22nd October 2026, it was announced that more than 65 diesel buses in Arriva Derby's fleet were to be replaced with electric ones.

== See also ==
- List of bus operators of the United Kingdom
