= Stockbrook =

Stockbrook or Stock Brook may refer to:

- Stockbrook, Derby, an area of Derby, England
  - Stockbrook Park, a public park in California, Derby, England
- Stock Brook, an area of Chadderton, Oldham, England, named after a stream
  - Stockbrook Mill, a mill in Oldham, England
- Stockbrook, a fictional river in the Shire, a region in the works of J. R. R. Tolkien.

== See also ==
- Stockbook
- Stockbroker
