= Derby and Sandiacre Canal Trust =

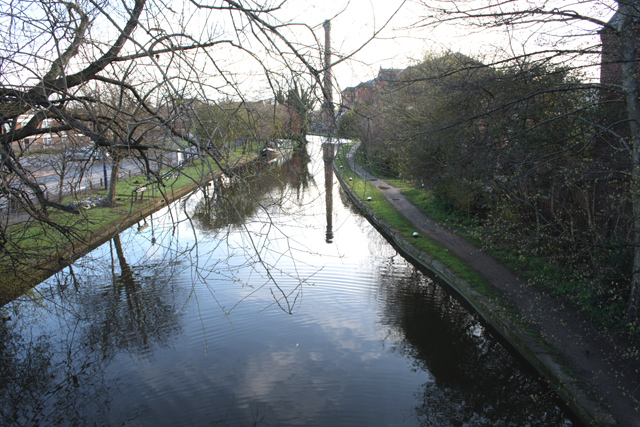

The Derby and Sandiacre Canal Trust is a waterway society, a charitable trust no. 1042227, registered 21 November 1994, and a registered company No. 2956417, operating in Derbyshire and Nottinghamshire, England, UK. Through its membership, the associated canal society supports the operation of the trust.

The society's aim is the restoration and re-opening of the Derby and Sandiacre Canal, the construction of the "Derby Arm" boat lift, and the return to navigation of the River Derwent. The trust's Development Committee are working on plans to see the Derby Canal restored to a fully navigable route with an associated multi-user towpath to enable access to all. As part of this work a submission has been made to have the canal route included in the Derbyshire County Council’s strategic infrastructure plan. This submission details the reasons and benefits for restoration and the high-level costs of restorations and potential funding sources.

The Derby Canal was opened in 1793 and ran for 14 miles from Swarkestone on the Trent and Mersey Canal to Sandiacre on the Erewash Canal.

The society was founded in 1994 and has over 1,600 members; many of these take part in working parties restoring bridges and locks, tree planting, hedge laying and fencing.

== See also ==
- List of waterway societies in the United Kingdom
- Derby Canal
