= Derby Canal =

Defunct canal in Derbyshire

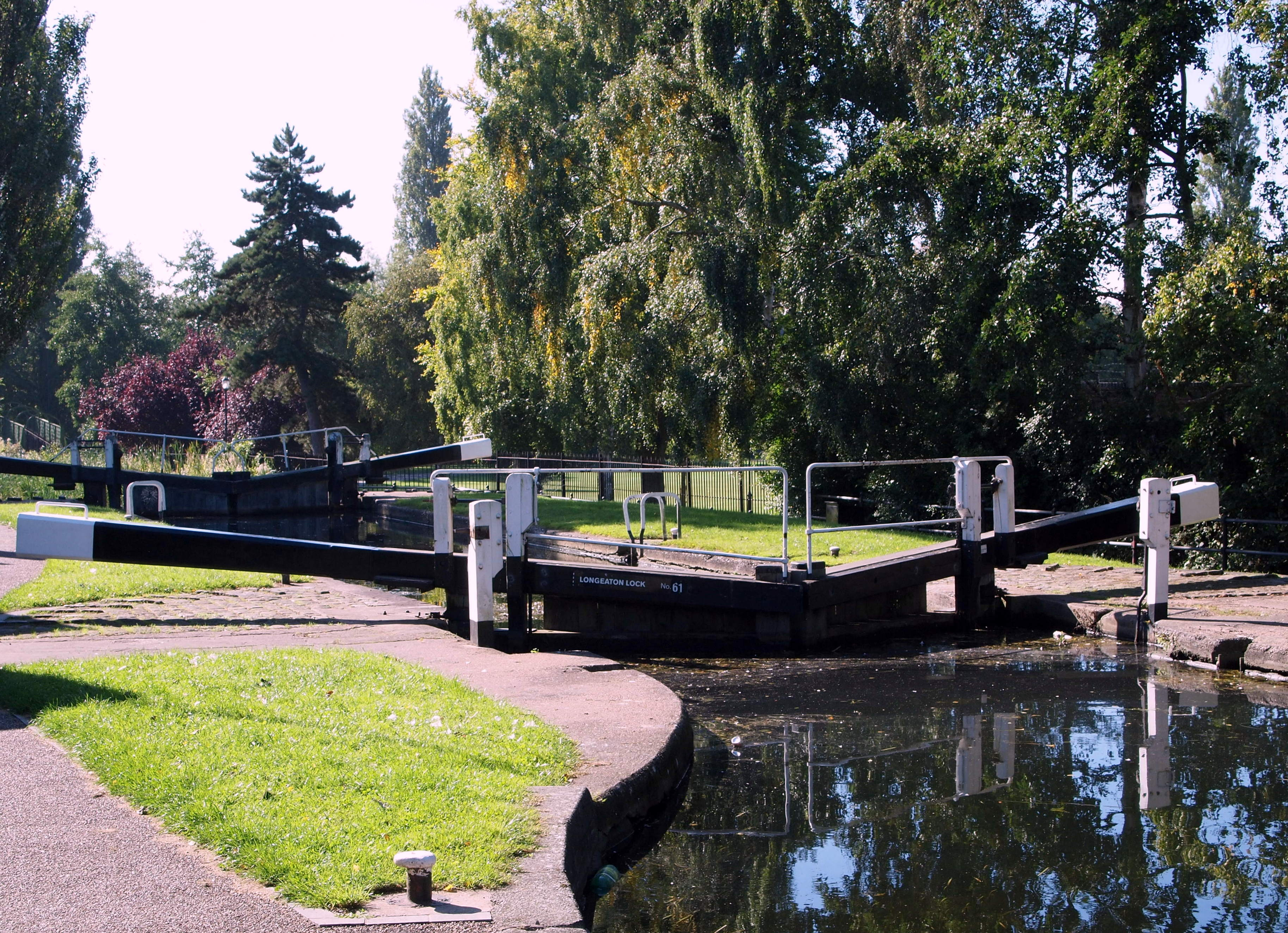
- The canal at Long Eaton
- Interactive map of Derby Canal

Specifications
- Maximum boat length: 72 ft 0 in (21.95 m)
- Maximum boat beam: 14 ft 0 in (4.27 m)
- Locks: 17
- Status: Under restoration

History
- Original owner: Derby Canal Co
- Principal engineer: Benjamin Outram
- Date of act: 1793
- Date of first use: 1795
- Date completed: 1796
- Date closed: 1964

Geography
- Start point: Derby
- End point: Swarkestone
- Connects to: Trent and Mersey Canal, Erewash Canal

The Derby Canal ran 14 miles (23 km) from the Trent and Mersey Canal at Swarkestone to Derby and Little Eaton, and to the Erewash Canal at Sandiacre, in Derbyshire, England. The canal was authorised by an act of Parliament, the Derby Canal Act 1793 (33 Geo. 3. c. 102) and was fully completed in 1796. It featured a level crossing of the River Derwent in the centre of Derby. An early tramroad, known as the Little Eaton Gangway, linked Little Eaton to coal mines at Denby. The canal's main cargo was coal, and it was relatively successful until the arrival of the railways in 1840. It gradually declined, with the gangway closing in 1908 and the Little Eaton Branch in 1935. Early attempts at restoration were thwarted by the closure of the whole canal in 1964. Since 1994, there has been an active campaign for restoration spearheaded by the Derby and Sandiacre Canal Trust and Society. Loss of the Derwent crossing due to development has resulted in an innovative engineering solution called the Derby Arm being proposed, as a way of transferring boats across the river.

== Origin ==
Although the River Derwent had been used for transport from the Trent since ancient times, it was winding and shallow in many places, silting frequently. The right to use it for navigation was conferred upon the citizens of Derby by King John in 1204. The engineer George Sorocold was involved with plans for improvements, although it is uncertain whether he was involved in the actual work. Plans had been first proposed in 1664, and bills had been presented to Parliament in 1696 and 1698. In 1703, Sorocold attended Parliament to give evidence for a scheme which involved four new cuts, with weirs and locks, on a 10-mile (16 km) stretch of the river. The bill failed, but the map for a similar scheme presented in 1717 was said to be drawn by Sorocold. This became the Derwent Navigation Act 1719 (6 Geo. 1. c. 27), and the work enabled boats to reach Derby in January 1721, but it was still difficult to navigate in periods of flood or dry weather. Indeed the Trent itself was little better.

In 1770, James Brindley had brought the Trent and Mersey Canal to the Trent near Shardlow. He proposed a canal from Swarkestone through Derby to join the Chesterfield Canal, but he was resisted by the Derwent Navigation and the Trent Navigation companies, and the matter was not raised again until 1791. Two schemes were then proposed by rival groups, one from Swarkestone to Derby, and the other from Derby to the Trent and Mersey Canal at Shardlow. By August 1792, the first scheme had grown to include a branch to Smithy House near Denby, another to Newhall and Swadlincote, and a third to Cheadle in Staffordshire, following a route through Sudbury and Uttoxeter. When Benjamin Outram was asked to carry out surveys later that year, it had been reduced to a more sensible size, and he estimated that the construction of a broad canal from Swarkestone to Smithy Houses, with a branch from Derby to the Erewash Canal at Sandiacre, including the purchase of the Derwent Navigation Company, would cost £60,000 (equivalent to £7.72 million in 2025).

The costs of the length from Derby to Denby would account for a third of this, and the plan included an aqueduct across the River Derwent at Derby, costing £8,160. Initially Outram suggested a narrow canal as an alternative. William Jessop was asked to give his opinion and he suggested a tramway from Little Eaton to Denby. This, the Derby Canal Railway, but known locally, as the Little Eaton Gangway, was therefore one of the first to be publicly subscribed, and would save the construction of six locks.

Outram also proposed to save some £4,000 by dispensing with the aqueduct and, instead, building a weir to raise the river level to form a basin adjacent to the Morledge, with locks connecting it to each branch of the canal. A bridge would carry the towpath across the basin. A small aqueduct would still be needed to cross the mill race on the west side of the Holmes.

== Construction ==
Derby Canal Act 1793
- Act of Parliament
- Parliament of Great Britain
- Long title: An Act for making and maintaining a Navigable Canal from the River Trent, at or near Swarkstone Bridge, to and through the Borough of Derby, to Little Eaton, with a Cut out of the said Canal, in or near the said Borough, to join the Erewash Canal near Sandiacre, and for making Railways from such Canal to several Collieries in the Parishes or Liberties of Denby Horsley and Smalley, all in the County of Derby.
- Citation: 33 Geo. 3. c. 102
- Territorial extent: Great Britain

Dates
- Royal assent: 7 May 1793
- Commencement: 7 May 1793 (Note: The Acts of Parliament (Commencement) Act 1793.)

Status: Current legislation

Text of statute as originally enacted

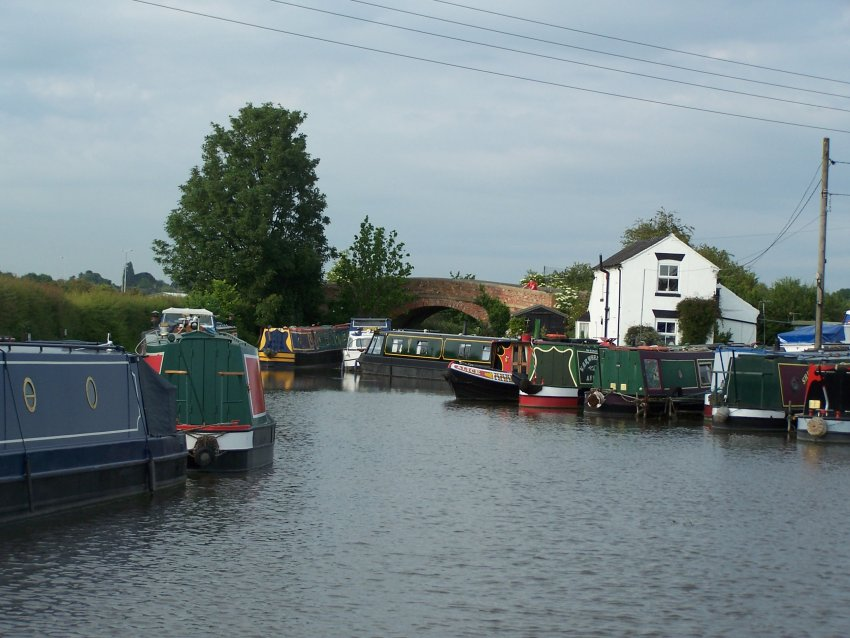
Swarkstone Junction and Toll House in 2007

The bill was passed by Parliament in 1793 by a narrow majority in the face of strong opposition from the Trent and Mersey Canal and the Erewash Canal owners who had a scheme of their own. It became the Derby Canal Act 1793 (33 Geo. 3. c. 102).

Work commenced with the Little Eaton branch and the gangway, followed by the Sandiacre line. This began with a small basin under what is now St. Alkmund's Way, proceeding eastwards following a line south of the Nottingham Road. A short branch from the basin led via Phoenix lock to the river above a weir at St. Mary's Bridge, which gave access to the Darley Abbey mills. These were located some 1.2 miles (1.9 km) upstream from the bridge. By 1904, the river was only used for the first 0.35 miles (0.56 km), up to the Great Northern Railway bridge, according to Bradshaw's Guide.

The Sandiacre line followed the course of the old Nottingham Road with two locks near Borrowash, then level through Draycott and Breaston, and descending through two locks to Sandiacre Junction with the Erewash Canal, a distance of 9 miles (14 km). The Little Eaton line branched northwards at the boundary of the racecourse, passing to the east of Chester Green, parallel to and east of the present day railway. The canal from Derby to Little Eaton was opened on 11 May 1795, the first load of coal from Denby being distributed to the poor of Derby. The Sandiacre line was opened on 30 May 1795.

Work then began on the crossing of the Derwent, followed by the line out to Swarkestone. From the small weir mentioned above a canal led through what is now Darwin Place to the Derwent Basin above the weir in the river which still exists behind the Council House, downstream of the Exeter Bridge. A timber causeway was built on trestles for use as the towpath. The weir also contained a culvert which transferred water between two branches, for a distance of about 0.25 miles (400 m).

From the basin the canal fell into a lock before crossing the mill race (which still runs beside Bass's Recreation Ground) by way of the cast-iron aqueduct arriving at Gandy's Wharf roughly where the Cockpit island is now.

It followed the line of the mill race before passing behind what became the Locomotive Works (now Pride Park), before turning sharply southwards towards Chellaston descending through Shelton and Fullen's locks. It joined the Trent and Mersey Canal at Swarkestone Junction, a distance of 5.5 miles (8.9 km) from Derby. A short extension led on to the River Trent just upstream from Swarkestone Bridge. The route from Derby to Swarkestone was opened on 30 June 1796.

== History ==
The Little Eaton gangway was built using cast iron plates, initially weighing 28 lb per yard (13.9 kg/m) although this was increased to 40 lb per yard (19.8 kg/m) for plates made after 1804. By 1825, there were nine passing places on the single-track line, which carried 2-ton waggons. Each waggon carried a box of coal, with a load of between 1.65 and 1.87 tons, which was transferred to a barge at Little Eaton wharf by a crane. From Smithy Houses, several private lines served the Denby Main colliery and other mines in the locality. Further extensions were made in the 1820s, by which time there were around 6 miles (9.7 km) of tramroad.

The Holmes Aqueduct proved to be extremely troublesome. Aqueducts up to that time had been made of stone, but several short arches would have been necessary, causing obstruction to the flow of the stream. The 44-foot-long (13 m) single-span cast iron structure that Outram devised, and completed in 1796, was the first of its kind, as it was completed a few weeks earlier than Longdon-on-Tern Aqueduct, the structure by Thomas Telford at Longdon-on-Tern on the Shrewsbury Canal.

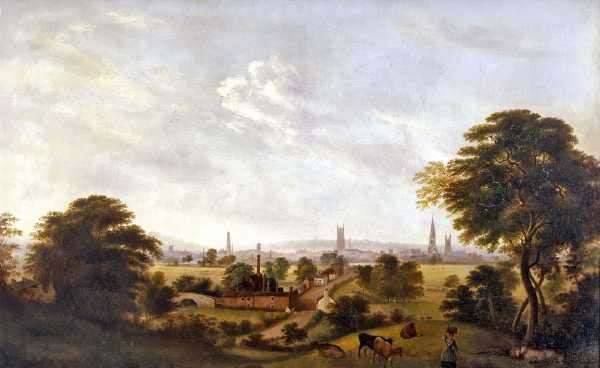
A painting of Derby from Nottingham Road c. 1850 by Henry Lark Pratt shows the Derby Canal in the foreground.

In 1802 there was a partial failure, probably due to the sides bowing and transferring too much weight to the base where they joined to the deck. After remedial work it failed again in 1812 and was reinforced with timber baulks. Although plans were prepared for replacement in stone, it survived until 1930, when the bottom plates were replaced by a wooden base, which was sealed by puddling.

In 1817 the link between the River Trent and the Trent and Mersey Canal was closed because of its lack of financial success. Maintenance charges had exceeded revenue since 1812, as it was little used because the Trent and Mersey canal charged compensation tolls at extortionate rates for boats using the link. Twenty years later it was dry. In 1838 the canal was diverted away from the River Derwent at Borrowash to allow construction of the Midland Counties Railway line between Derby and Long Eaton. This diversion included building a new Borrowash Top Lock.

The canal was relatively successful before the arrival of railways. Traffic figures are scarce, but in 1798, 28,571 tons of coal were recorded, of which 40 per cent came from the Little Eaton gangway. By 1803 this had risen to 50,374 tons, with 55 per cent from the gangway. Rather than it just supplying Derby, the company encouraged through trade on the canal, and this contributed to its profitability. Regular dividends were paid to shareholders from 1811, although some had been paid in previous years. Initially, they were close to the 5 per cent promised by the original Derby Canal Act 1793, but reached 12 per cent in 1839. Although this exceeded the amount specified by the act, it was justified as covering years where the 5 per cent had not been made. Traffic figures for February and March 1839 indicate that the Little Eaton line carried 13,332 tons, the Sandiacre line carried 15,725 tons, and 9,773 tons were carried on the Swarkestone line. This would suggest that the total for the year was around 200,000 tons.

== Decline ==
In 1830 the company considered building a locomotive line from Derby to Smithy Houses, and two years later looked at the possibility of a locomotive line from Derby to Little Eaton. The first was surveyed by an engineer called Stephenson, presumed to be George Stephenson, but no further action was taken. Toll reductions were made from 1834, in an attempt to stay competitive, but by 1840 there were three main line railways in Derby. By 1845, tolls on the Little Eaton line were less than half what they had been five years earlier. The Derby and Gainsborough Company wanted to buy the Little Eaton line in 1846, and were quoted £30,000, as were the Midland Railway in 1847. Instead, they built a parallel line to Ripley, which opened in 1855.

Receipts fell from £8,180 to £2,556 between 1838 and 1868, and dividends for the same period fell from 10.5 per cent to 4 per cent. An attempt was made in 1872 to sell the whole canal to the Midland Railway for £90,000, without success, and a similar offer to the London and North Western Railway also failed. Traffic suffered further decline when Butterley Tunnel on the neighbouring Cromford Canal had to be closed. The Little Eaton gangway was closed in 1908, ten years after the action was first considered, and the Little Eaton branch followed on 4 July 1935, when the company obtained a warrant for its closure. Attempts to close the Sandiacre line in 1937 were thwarted by objections from Imperial Chemical Industries. Commercial traffic on the remainder of the canal ceased in 1945. In 1964 the canal company gained permission to close the rest of the canal. Over the next three decades, areas of the canal were built on while others were allowed to decay.

== Restoration ==
In view of proposals to abandon the canal, B. A. Mallender, who lived in the locality, asked the fledgling Inland Waterways Association to help mount a campaign for its revival in 1947. The author Tom Rolt made a series of cruises on threatened waterways at this time, but could not obtain permission to navigate the Derby Canal. Rolt took his case to the Ministry of Transport, seeking to invoke the conditions of the Railway and Canal Traffic Act 1888 (51 & 52 Vict. c. 25), but was told that they would not sanction an inspection of the canal, because the company had intimated that they were preparing to restore the waterway. In 1956 a local committee was formed to campaign for restoration. By 1961, Derby Council were actively promoting the infilling of the canal, and so the Inland Waterways Association together with the Derby Canal Restoration Committee wrote to the Derby Evening Telegraph, calling for the canal's restoration. Although the council refused to comment, the letter, which was published on 1 February 1961, caused considerable local debate, and a protest cruise was organised on the Erewash Canal, with the Derby Canal entrance lock as the destination. The Times national newspaper carried details of the event, and a subsequent meeting held on 27 May called for a public enquiry into how best to restore the canal for commercial and amenity use. Despite the campaigns, the company obtained a warrant to abandon the whole canal in 1964.

With the changed economic climate of the 1990s and the success of other restoration schemes, a feasibility study was carried out in 1994. It included detailed plans for restoration, and concluded that the cost for reinstating the 14-mile (23 km) main line would be £17.3 million. To make progress, a company called the Derby and Sandiacre Canal Trust was formed, with volunteer input managed by the Derby and Sandiacre Canal Society. In early 1996, construction of the Derby Bypass threatened to sever the line at Swarkestone, although the Department of Transport suggested that a navigable culvert could be provided if the Canal Society paid for it. In 2000, Derby Council assisted the canal trust in applying for a £3.2 million grant from the Heritage Lottery Fund, to create a linear park by restoring the canal from Spondon to Sandiacre, while the canal was identified as one of several projects which British Waterways thought they could assist, at its annual general meeting held in 2001.

By mid-2003, the canal trust has succeeded in getting the whole route of the canal protected by inclusion in the local council structure plans. By this time, the estimated cost of restoration had risen to £34 million, but they launched a major initiative to raise the funding over a 10-year period. Grants from the Derbyshire City Partnership received from 2008 enabled the Trust Development Group to begin the process of applying for outline planning permission for reinstatement. The route of the canal passes through three local council regions, and so separate applications had to be made to Derby City Council, Erewash Borough Council and South Derbyshire District Council. All three applications had been approved by 24 August 2011, paving the way for actual reinstatement to begin, subject to the necessary funding being available. The restoration plans do not include reinstatement of a level crossing of the River Derwent. The site of the original crossing has been lost to development, and there would be issues with water supply and flood risk associated with a crossing on the level. An innovative solution has been suggested in the form of the Derby Arm, which would transport a caisson containing water and a boat in a semi-circular arc from one side of the river to the other. Its design is similar to a medieval trebuchet.

Plans for the restoration were threatened in 2013 when the route of High Speed 2, a high-speed rail link from London to Birmingham, Manchester and York, were published. This envisaged an East Midlands Hub station at Toton, which would have destroyed part of the canal route, but revised plans were published on 15 November 2016, with the station moved to avoid the canal. The chairman of the Derby and Sandiacre Canal Trust, Chris Madge, was still concerned that a tramway to link the station to Derby would impinge upon the canal, but was hopeful that the canal in this area could be reopened before tramway construction began, and that the plans for the tramway would therefore have to accommodate the canal.

== The canal today ==
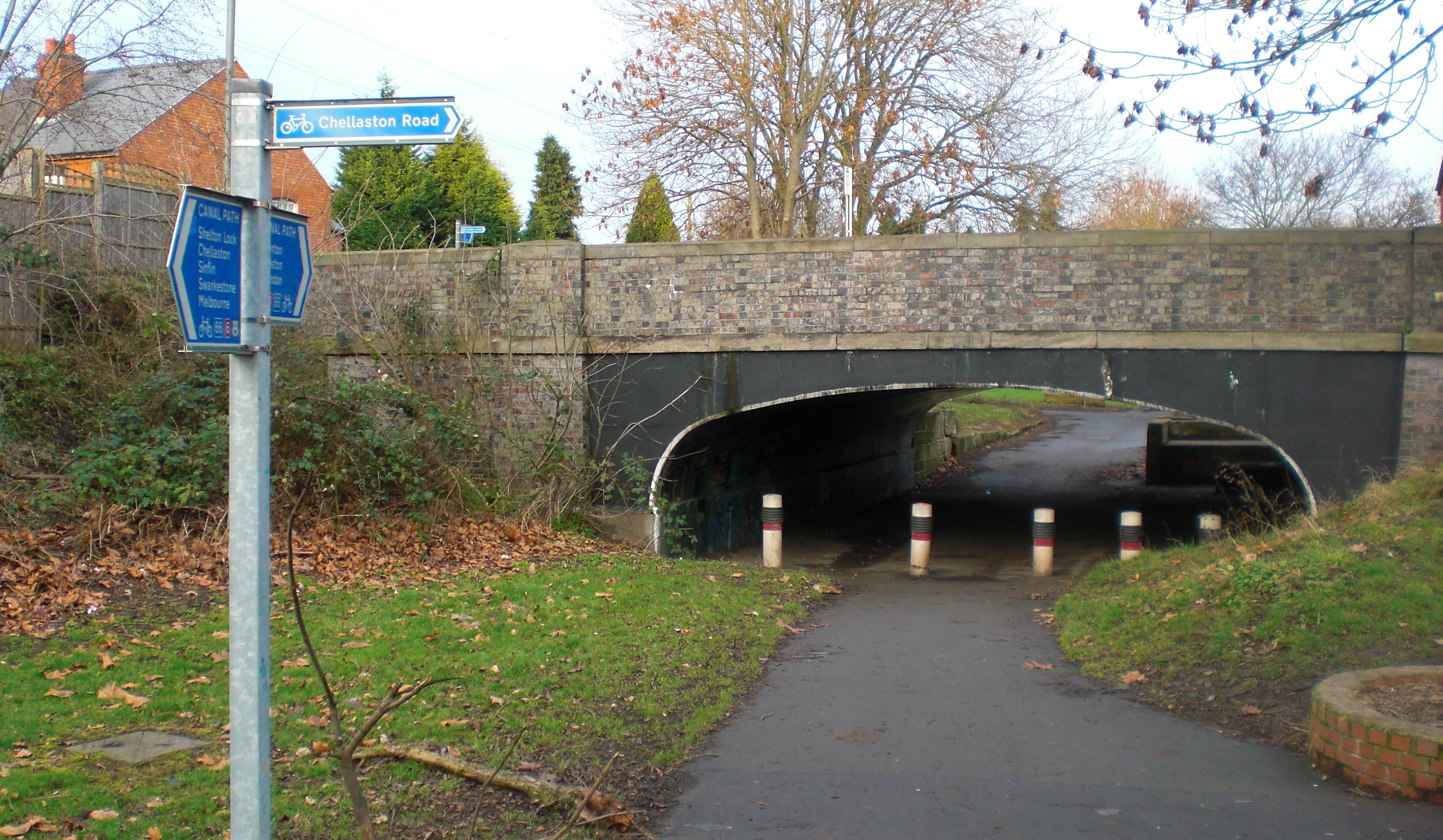
The former canal at Shelton Lock, now a footpath

From Swarkestone the line of the canal can be followed into Derby as far as Wilmorton although the only recognisable canal features are the chambers of Fullen's and Shelton Locks and the bridges under Chellaston Road (pictured) and London Road. Route 6 of the National Cycle Network (NCN 6) follows this part of the canal.

Although traces of the canal through Derby city centre remained until well into the twentieth century (the ice factory on what was the Cockpit island drew its water from the canal), it has all been covered by development, mainly the inner ring road and Pride Parkway. New building at Pride Park has obliterated all traces of the canal in that area.

The weir built across the river to form the Derwent Basin still exists behind the Council House, downstream of the Exeter Bridge, and the timber causeway on trestles, which was used as the towpath, remained until 1959. The Holmes Aqueduct was removed in 1971, and after a period in storage at a council depot, was sold for scrap.

The remains of the towpath are visible at a bridge under the railway immediately north of Derby railway station. An unused span of the railway bridge over Old Nottingham Road once crossed the canal. Steel girders set into the kerb edge of Old Nottingham Road near its junction with Stores Road are the remains of a bridge over the Little Eaton line. The Little Eaton line and the gangway have also disappeared, apart from the Wharf Building at Little Eaton, in the present day trading estate, and a couple of bridges. The clock house is a grade II listed structure, built for the canal's agent at the junction between the canal and the Little Eaton gangway. It is an L-shaped building, constructed of red bricks with a tiled roof in about 1795.

The A52 Brian Clough Way was built upon the canal between the Pentagon and Spondon. From Spondon the line can be traced to Sandiacre. NCN 6 uses the canal route between Borrowash and Breaston. One of the few original bridges is situated between the A6005 Derby Road and the railway at Borrowash. It is constructed of red brick with stone dressings, and is grade II listed. The lock-keepers cottage at Sandiacre Lock also dates from around the time of the opening of the canal, and although it has additional windows added in the nineteenth and twentieth centuries, most of it is original.

== Points of interest ==
Point	Coordinates (Links to map resources)	OS Grid Ref	Notes
Junction with Erewash Canal	52.9176°N 1.2846°W	SK481358	
Sandiacre Top Lock	52.9154°N 1.2874°W	SK480355	
M1 Motorway embankment	52.9068°N 1.3004°W	SK471346	
Borrowash Bottom Lock	52.9021°N 1.3754°W	SK421340	
Borrowash Top Lock	52.9040°N 1.3838°W	SK415342	
Junction with Little Eaton Branch	52.9255°N 1.4647°W	SK360365	
Pasture Lock	52.9293°N 1.4659°W	SK359370	
Chemical Lock	52.9328°N 1.4667°W	SK359374	
Middle Lock	52.9361°N 1.4648°W	SK360377	
Top Lock	52.9419°N 1.4618°W	SK362384	
Long Eaton Wharf	52.9660°N 1.4635°W	SK361410	
Phoenix Lock	52.9262°N 1.4735°W	SK354366	
White Bear Lock	52.9242°N 1.4713°W	SK356364	
Peggs Flood Lock	52.9223°N 1.4711°W	SK356362	
Days Lock	52.9209°N 1.4695°W	SK357360	
Shelton Lock	52.8774°N 1.4450°W	SK374312	
Fullen's Lock	52.8760°N 1.4500°W	SK371310	
Junction with Trent and Mersey Canal	52.8590°N 1.4507°W	SK370291	Swarkestone Junction

== See also ==
- Canals of Great Britain
- History of the British canal system
- Chesterfield Canal
- Chesterfield Canal Trust
- Derby and Sandiacre Canal Trust
- List of waterway societies in the United Kingdom

== Bibliography ==
- Barnes, E.G. (1966). The Rise of the Midland Railway 1844–1874. Allen & Unwin. ISBN 978-0-04-385003-9.
- Garner, Edward (2003). The Seven Canals of Derbyshire. Landmark Publishing. ISBN 1-84306-072-8.
- Hadfield, Charles (1970). The Canals of the East Midlands. David & Charles. ISBN 978-0-7153-4871-0.
- Russell, R. (1971). Lost Canals of England and Wales. David & Charles. ISBN 978-0-7153-5417-9.
- Schofield, R.B. (2000). Benjamin Outram 1764–1805 : an engineering biography. Cardiff: Merton Priory. ISBN 978-1-898937-42-5.
- Skempton, Sir Alec; et al. (2002). A Biographical Dictionary of Civil Engineers in Great Britain and Ireland: Vol 1: 1500 to 1830. Thomas Telford. ISBN 978-0-7277-2939-2.
- Smith, Michael E. (1980). The Derby Canal. Ilkeston: Moorley's Bible and Bookshop. ISBN 978-0-86071-089-9.
- Squires, Roger (2008). Britain's restored canals. Landmark Publishing. ISBN 978-1-84306-331-5.
