= Sunny Hill (disambiguation) =

Sunny Hill is a South Korean K-pop group.

Sunny Hill, Sunnyhill, Sunny Hills, or other similar variants may refer to:

== Music ==
- Sunny Hill Festival, a music festival held annually in Kosovo and Albania

== Education ==
- Sunny Hill School, Quezon City, the Philippines
- Sunny Hill Elementary School, Brownsville, Tennessee
- Sunny Hills High School, Fullerton, California
- SMS Sunny Hill, Kuching, Sarawak, Malaysia

== Places ==
- Sunny Hill, Derby
- Sunny Hill, Kuching, Sarawak, Malaysia
- Sunny Hill Park, Barnet, London
- Sunny Hill Plantation, Leon County, Florida
- Sunny Hills, Orange County, California
- Sunny Hills, Washington County, Florida
- Sunnyhills, New Zealand

== See also ==
- Bregu i Diellit
