= Derby Corporation Tramways =

Tramway operator in England

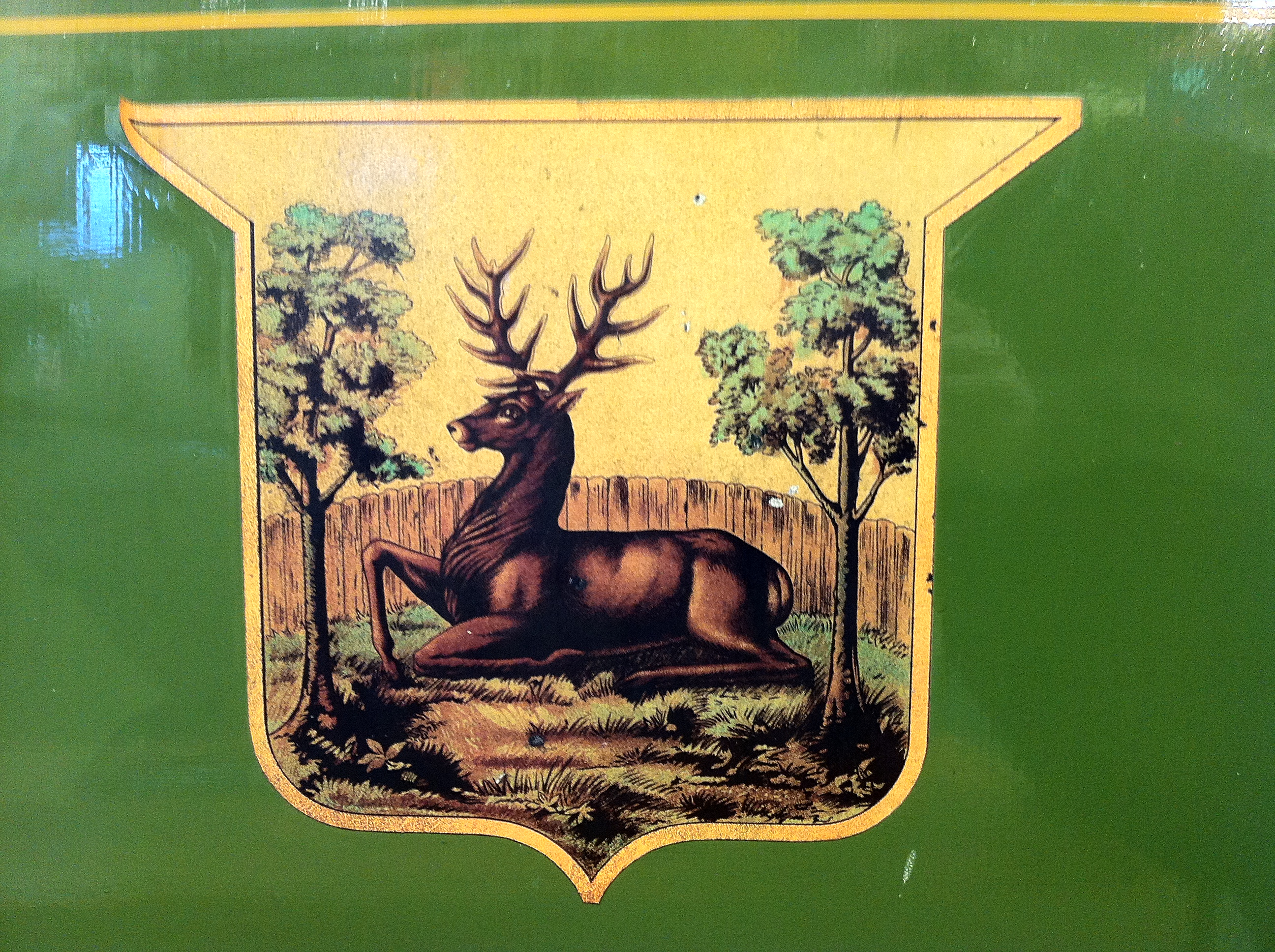

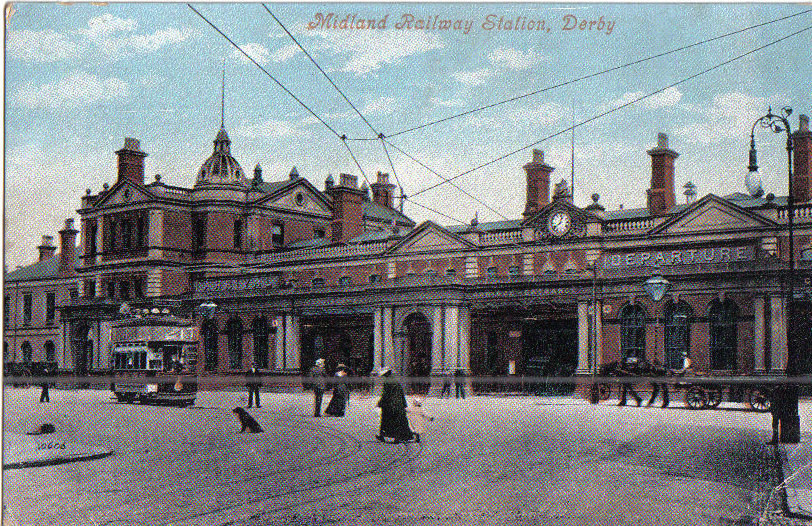
- Derby Corporation tram waiting outside Derby railway station

Operation
- Locale: Derby, Derbyshire, England

Statistics
Electric era: 1904–1934
- Status: Closed
- Operator: Derby Corporation Tramways
- Track gauge: 4 ft (1,219 mm)
- Propulsion system: Electricity
- Depots: Nottingham Road, and Osmaston Road

Derby Corporation Tramways was the tram system serving the city of Derby (then a town), England. It opened on 27 July 1904.

== History ==
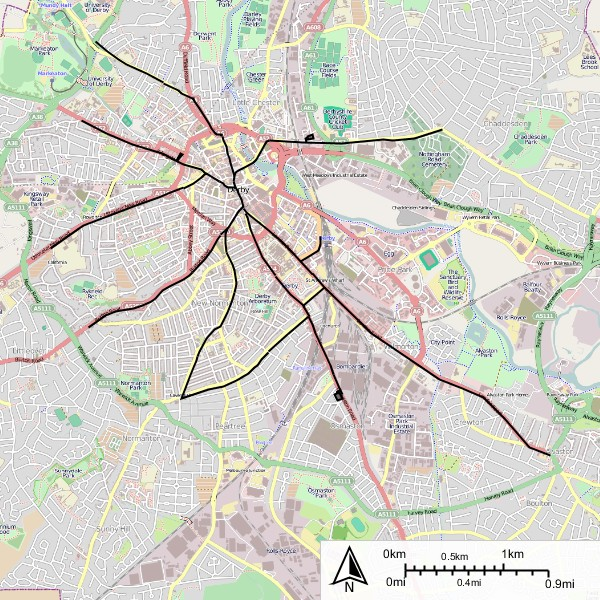
Map of the Derby Corporation Tramways

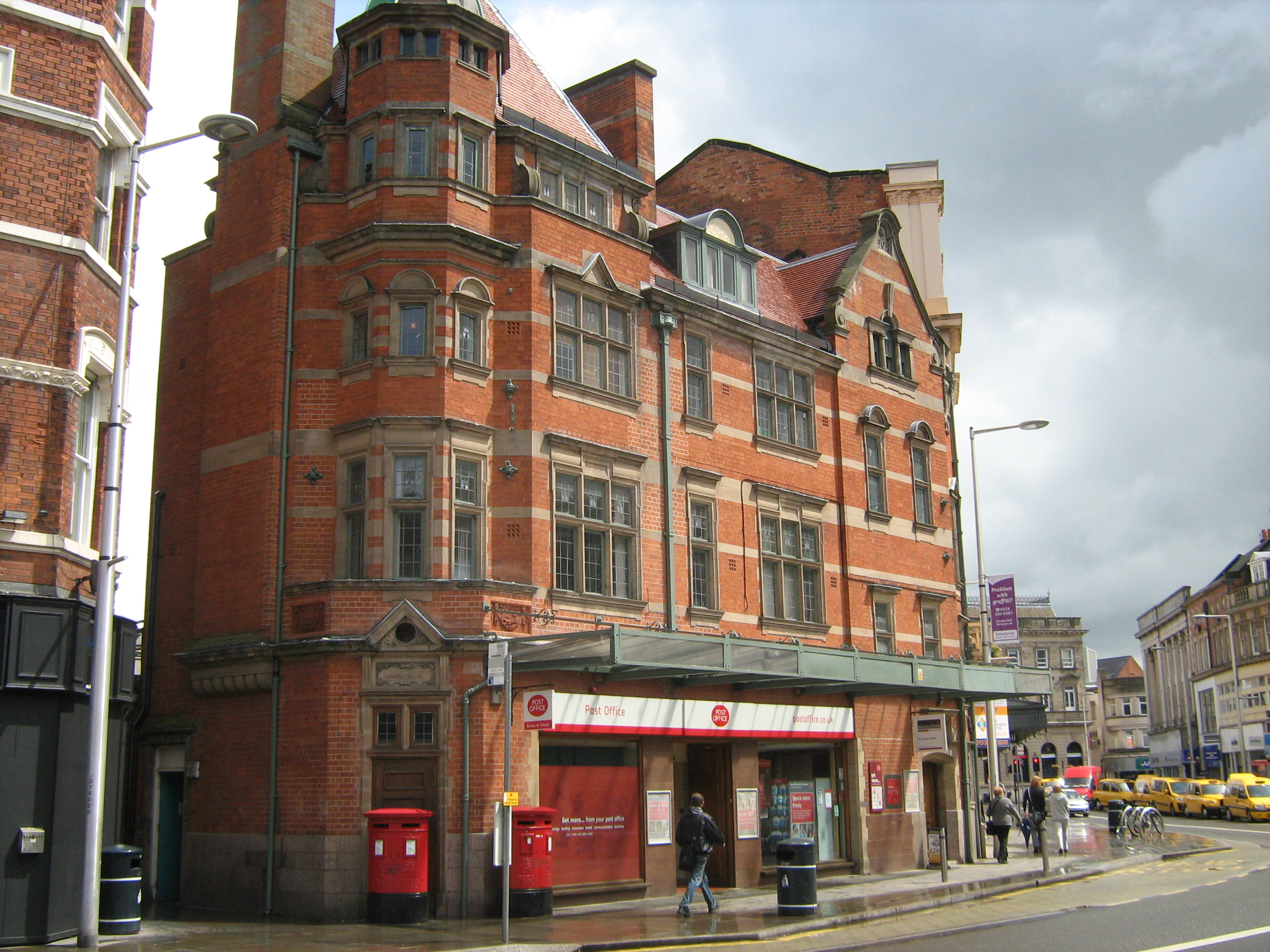
Former Tramways Office on Victoria Street by architect Alexander MacPherson now Grade II listed.

The company was formed by the corporation which took over the assets of the Derby Tramways Company, which had provided horse-drawn tramway services since 1880.

The initial lines electrified were the London Road and Osmaston Road routes. Six decorated cars travelled over these routes on 27 July 1904 carrying the mayor and corporation with various officials. The electric tramway service was officially opened by the Mayor of Derby in a ceremony at the tramshed on Alvaston Road. The scheme entailed an expenditure of between £80,000 and £90,000 (equivalent to £8,410,000 in 2025) to (equivalent to £9,460,000 in 2025).

The remaining routes along St Peter's Street, Babington Land, Normanton Road, Burton Road, and also along Bateman Street, Douglas Street and Dairy House Road were electrified and opened on 8 September 1904 after inspection by Major Pringle of the Board of Trade on 7 September 1904. The same date also saw the opening of the new tramway offices in Victoria Street.

The work to extend the electric tramway at a cost of £4,000 (equivalent to £420,000 in 2025) from St Peter's Street to Market Head commenced on 2 January 1905 with a contract awarded to J. G. White and Co. This was inspected by Major Pringle on 24 February 1905 and opened the same day for traffic.

An extension along Kedleston Road constructed by William Griffiths and Co. was opened on 29 July 1905 and the extension along Walbrook Road linking the Pear Tree and Upper Dale routes opened on 5 September.

In January 1907 it was agreed to extend tram routes along Ashbourne Road and Uttoxeter Road. A contract was awarded to Blackwell and Co. with the aim of having the routes opened by the August Bank Holiday but the contractor ran into difficulty and these routes were not opened until 28 November 1907.

An extension along Nottingham Road opened on 8 February 1908 and one on Burton Road opened on 30 July 1908.

The four-foot gauge tramways were replaced by Derby trolleybuses. The conversion began in 1932.

As the service was converted to trolley-bus operation, the corporation started disposed of tramcars with the first 27 being sold for scrap at £10 each. Fourteen tramcars were sold in July 1933 to Messrs. Grahamsley's Ltd of Newcastle for £175. Bodies from tramcars were utilised for summer-houses, and others were turned into week-end bungalows on Derby allotments. Two cars were acquired by Derby Education Committee for dressing rooms at school tennis courts at Homelands, Normanton. Parts of other cars were used to build poultry houses in the Brailsford district.

As the service closed it was reported that £296,000 had been expended on permanent way, cars and electrical equipment. The tramcars had run a total of 36.5 million miles, and 445 million passenger had been carried. This had resulted in £2,396,720 in fares during the 30-year period of operation.

The final passenger service operated on 29 June 1934 and the last tram ran over the system on 2 July 1934 on a ceremonial run when P. W. Bancroft, general manager, chose one of the companies longest serving employees, William Spencer, to drive. As the tram approached the depot, William Spencer surrendered control to the mayor who drove it into the yard.

== Depots ==
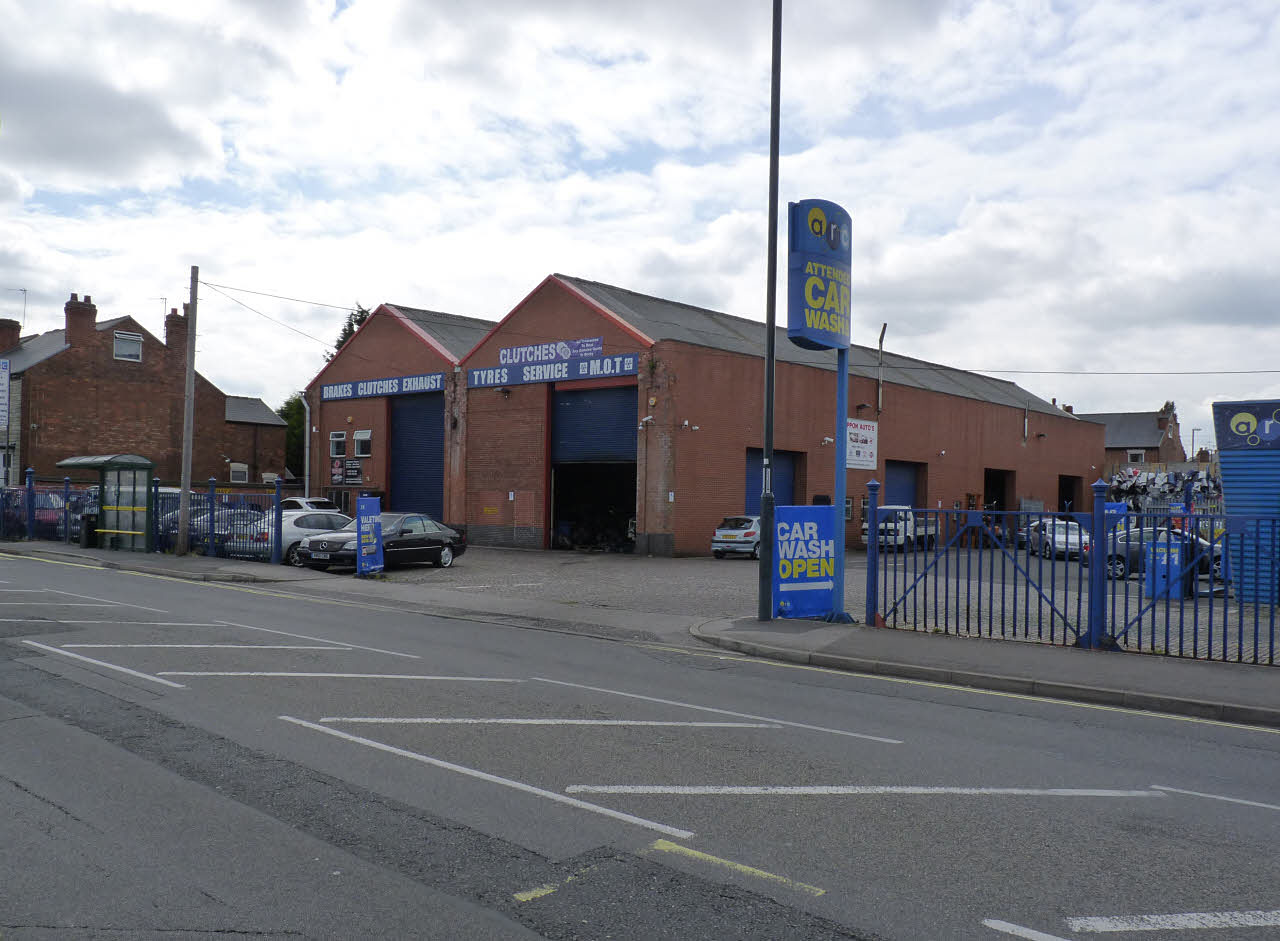
The remains of the car shed at the Osmaston Road depot

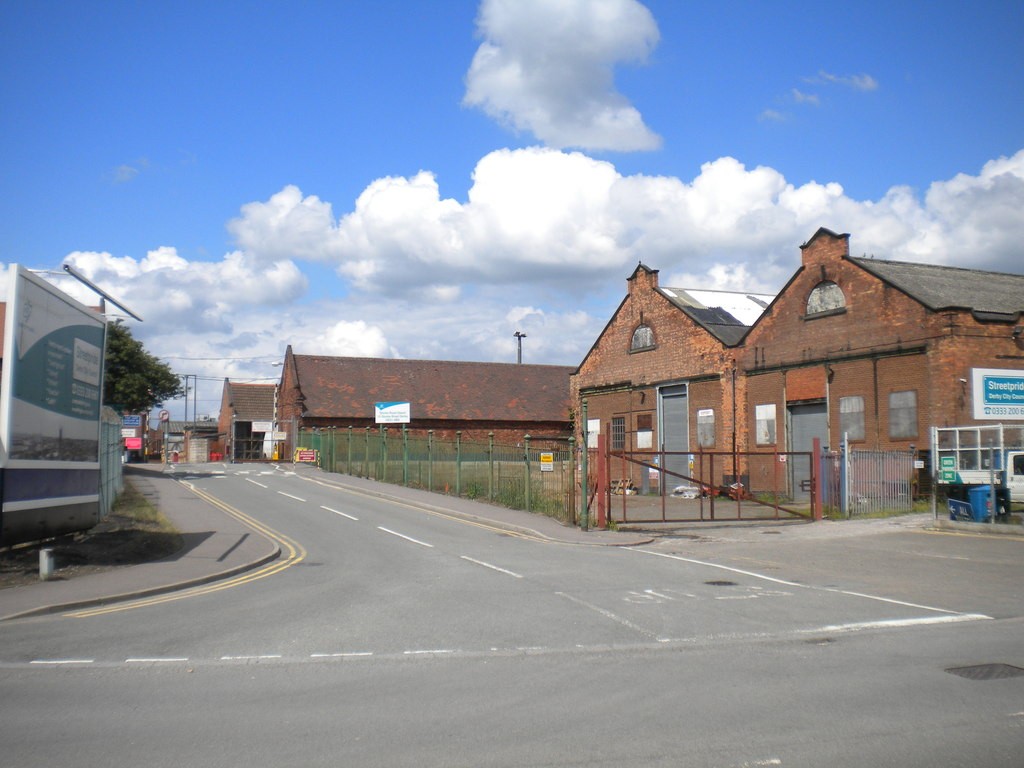
The car shed at the Nottingham Road depot (demolished 2021)

There were two depots for the tramcars

- Osmaston Road (at the junction with Abington Street)
- Nottingham Road (at the junction with Stores Road)

== Officers ==
=== General Managers ===
- Frank Harding 1898 - 1928 (formerly manager of Derby Tramways Company)
- Percy William Bancroft 1929 - 1934

== Preserved trams ==
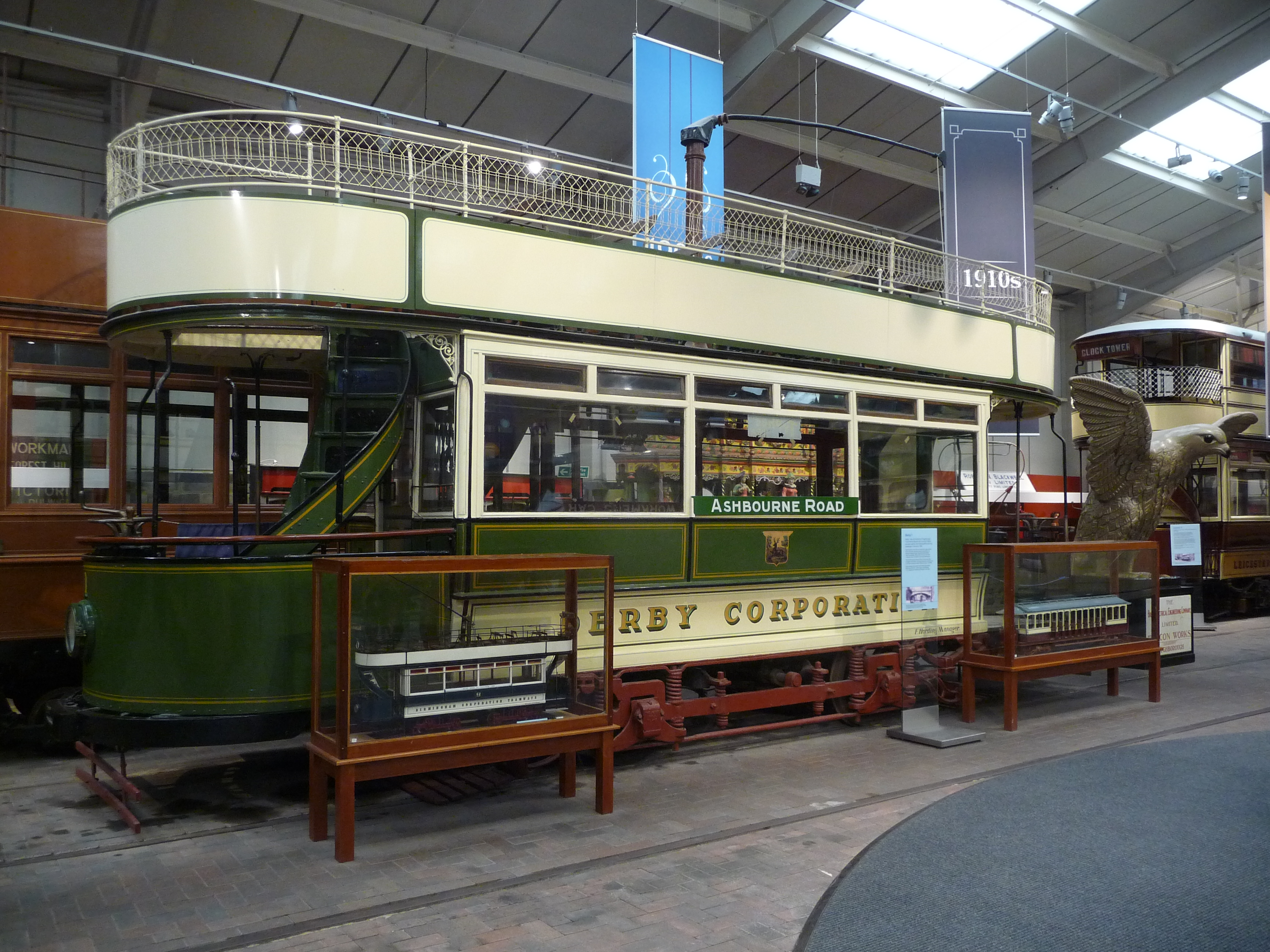
Derby tram No. 1 at Crich Tramway Village

Tramcar n°1 is the only Derby tramcar preserved and is owned by the National Tramway Museum in Crich, Derbyshire. After many years of display at Crich, the car is now on loan to the Great Northern Classics venture, located appropriately in the former Derby tram depot at Osmaston Road, where it will be displayed alongside classic motor vehicles and help to provide apprentices with valuable heritage engineering skills.
