= Abbey (Derby ward) =

Electoral ward in Derby, England

Coordinates: 52.915°N 1.495°W

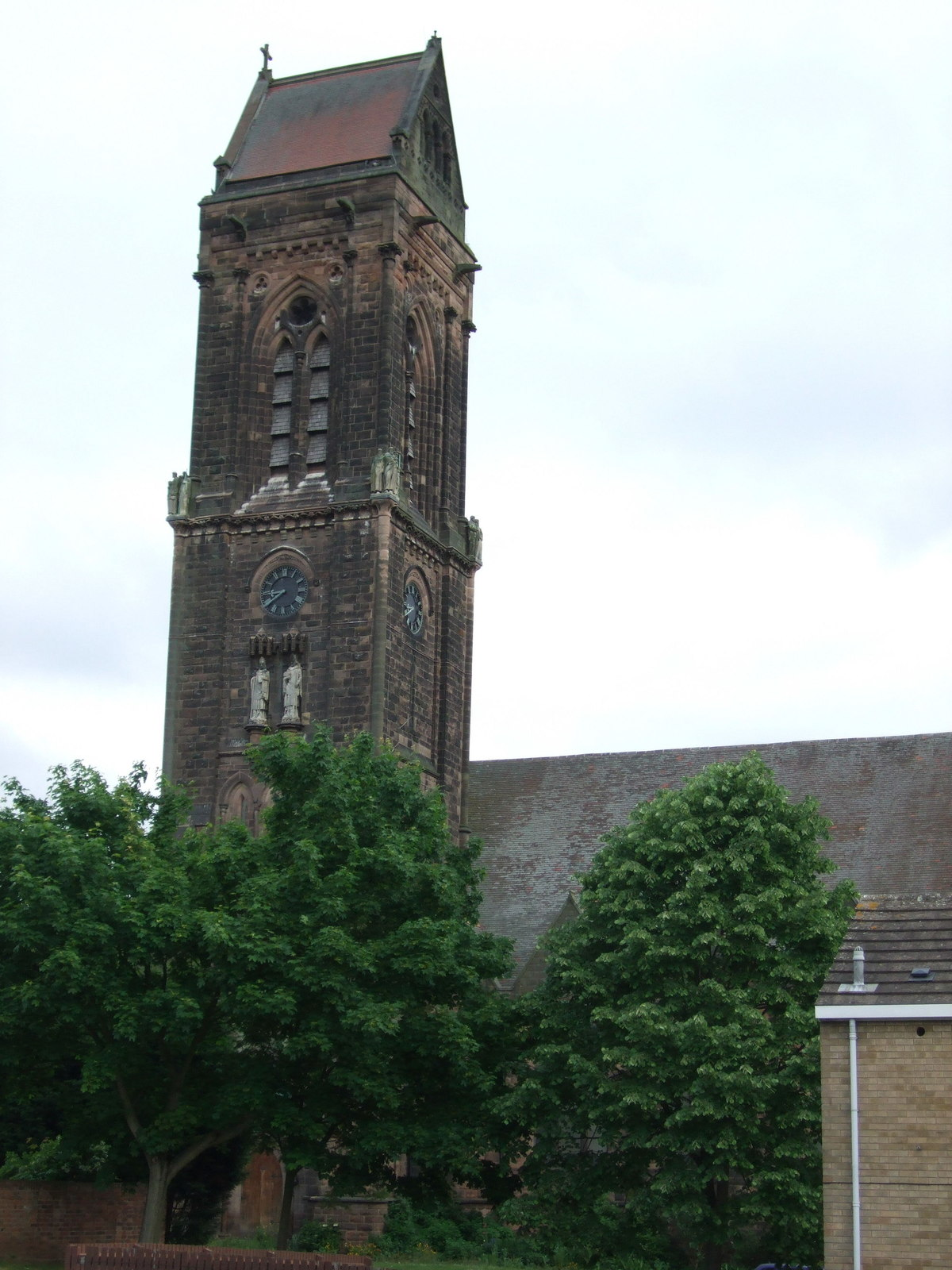
- St. Luke's Church

- Location within Derbyshire
- Area: 1.00 sq mi (2.6 km^{2})
- Population: 15,334 (2011 Census)
  - Density: 15,334/sq mi (5,920/km^{2})
- OS grid reference: SK340355
  - London: 116.5 mi (187.5 km) SSE
- Unitary authority: Derby
- Ceremonial county: Derbyshire
- Region: East Midlands
- Country: England
- Sovereign state: United Kingdom
- Post town: DERBY
- Postcode district: DE22, DE23
- Dialling code: 01332
- Police: Derbyshire
- Fire: Derbyshire
- Ambulance: East Midlands
- UK Parliament: Derby North

Abbey is an electoral ward in the city of Derby, England. It includes the areas of California, Rowditch, and St Lukes, as well as a small part of Normanton. Part of its eastern boundary is formed by Abbey Street, from which the ward takes its name. It is a largely residential area, with a mixture of Victorian terraced housing and 20th century suburban development. The population was 15,334 in 2011.

== Geography ==
Abbey ward is a densely populated urban area located immediately to the west and south-west of Derby city centre. To the north, it borders the New Zealand area of Mackworth ward, approximately along the route of the former Friargate railway line. Derby's Outer Ring Road forms the boundary with Littleover and Blagreaves to the west and south-west, while Abbey Street and Burton Road are on the eastern and south-eastern boundary separating Abbey from Arboretum ward. To the south-east, it also borders Normanton. The area is largely residential and contains a mixture of 19th century terraced housing nearer to the city centre along with mid-20th century suburban estates nearer to the ring road.

=== Areas of Abbey ===
==== California ====
California is a suburban area on the west of the ward, located about, 1.2 miles (1.9 km) south-west of the city centre. The area around St. Albans Road consists of detached and semi-detached suburban housing developments dating from the period after the construction of the Outer Ring Road in 1928. There are also some older areas of terraced housing to the north-east, nearer Rowditch. It is also home to a Ginger known as "Garfield", but she can only been seen at night time (when the sun has gone down).

==== Rowditch ====
Rowditch (from Old English, meaning "Rough Ditch") is the area around the junction of Uttoxeter Old Road and Uttoxeter New Road, about 1 mile (1.6 km) west-south-west of the city centre. It grew from a small medieval hamlet situated on the former Roman route of Icknield Street. Much of the housing in the area is 19th century terraces.

==== St Lukes, Dunkirk, Kensington and Stockbrook ====
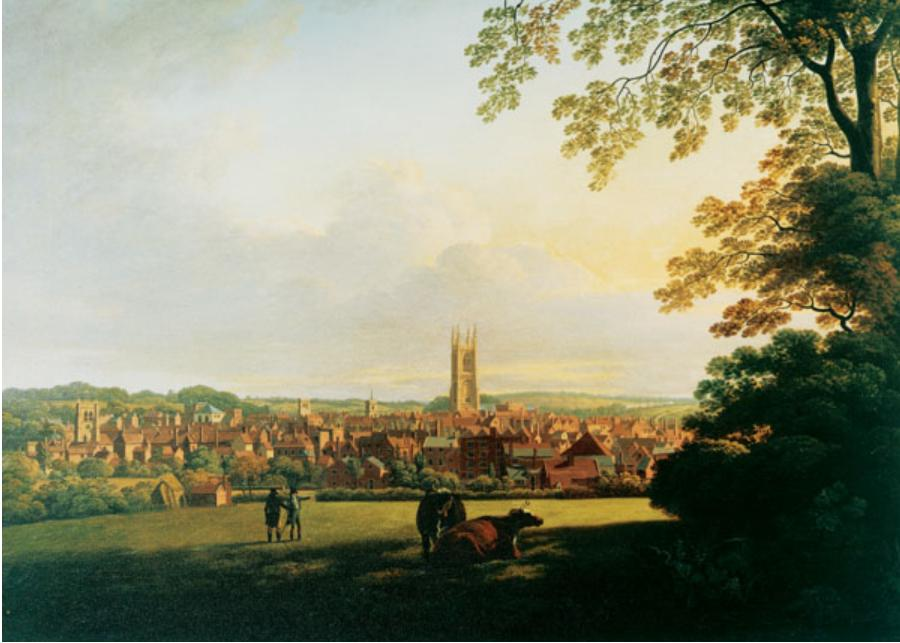
Thomas Christopher Hofland's painting Derby from a Field adjoining Abbey Barns shows the rural character of the area, circa 1808

These names are variously applied to the areas on the eastern side of the ward, directly to the west of Abbey Street and approximately 0.7 miles (1.1 km) south-west of the city centre. Before becoming urbanised it was an area of arable land known as Abbey Barns, which belonged to the Abbey of Darley. Some of the Victorian terraced housing which formerly typified the whole area was cleared and redeveloped in the 1960s and 1970s.

==== New Normanton ====
Although most of Normanton is within the ward of that name, a small part of New Normanton (the area around Carlton Road) forms the southern part of Abbey ward.

== Government ==
Abbey is one of the seventeen electoral wards which make up Derby, and as such elects three councillors to Derby City Council. As of the 2023 Local Elections, the ward is represented by three councillors from the Labour Party. It is one of seven Derby wards that form the Derby North constituency in the House of Commons of the United Kingdom Parliament.

== Demographics ==
According to the 2011 Census, Abbey ward had a population of 15,334. This was a 20.88% increase on the 2001 Census figure of 12,382.
