= New Zealand, Derby =

Suburb of Derby, England

Coordinates: 52.923°N 1.502°W

New Zealand
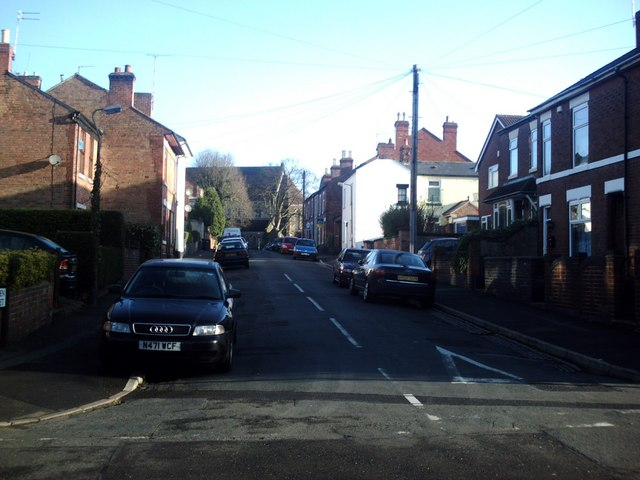
- Cobden Street, New Zealand
- SSE
- Unitary authority: Derby
- Ceremonial county: Derbyshire
- Region: East Midlands
- Country: England
- Sovereign state: United Kingdom
- Post town: DERBY
- Postcode district: DE22
- Dialling code: 01332
- Police: Derbyshire
- Fire: Derbyshire
- Ambulance: East Midlands
- UK Parliament: Derby North

New Zealand is an inner-city suburb of Derby in Derbyshire, England. It is surrounded by the Mackworth Estate, Rowditch and The West End suburbs. New Zealand also incorporates an area called the Morley Estate.

It is named after a farm belonging to the Chandos-Pole family which formerly stood in this area of Derby. The farm was originally named to commemorate the Treaty of Waitangi in 1840, which established a British Government in New Zealand.

New Zealand's boundaries are Uttoxeter Old Road to Ashbourne Road/Friargate then Ashbourne Road to Markeaton Island/A38 then Markeaton Island/A38 to A38/Kingsway then A38/Kingsway to Brackensdale Bridge/Lyttleton Street then Lyttleton Street to Cheviot Street then Cheviot Street to Slack Lane and finally Slack Lane to Uttoxeter Old Road.

There is the New Zealand Area Centre (the Lonny Wilsoncroft Centre) on Campion Street/Stepping Lane.

== Education and schools ==
The area has one primary school Ashgate school whose main vehicular entrance is on Frederick Street but can also be accessed on foot from Ashbourne Road and also one nursery Ashgate nursery, which is located on the corner of Stepping Lane and Ashbourne Road and Fowler Street and Stepping Lane.

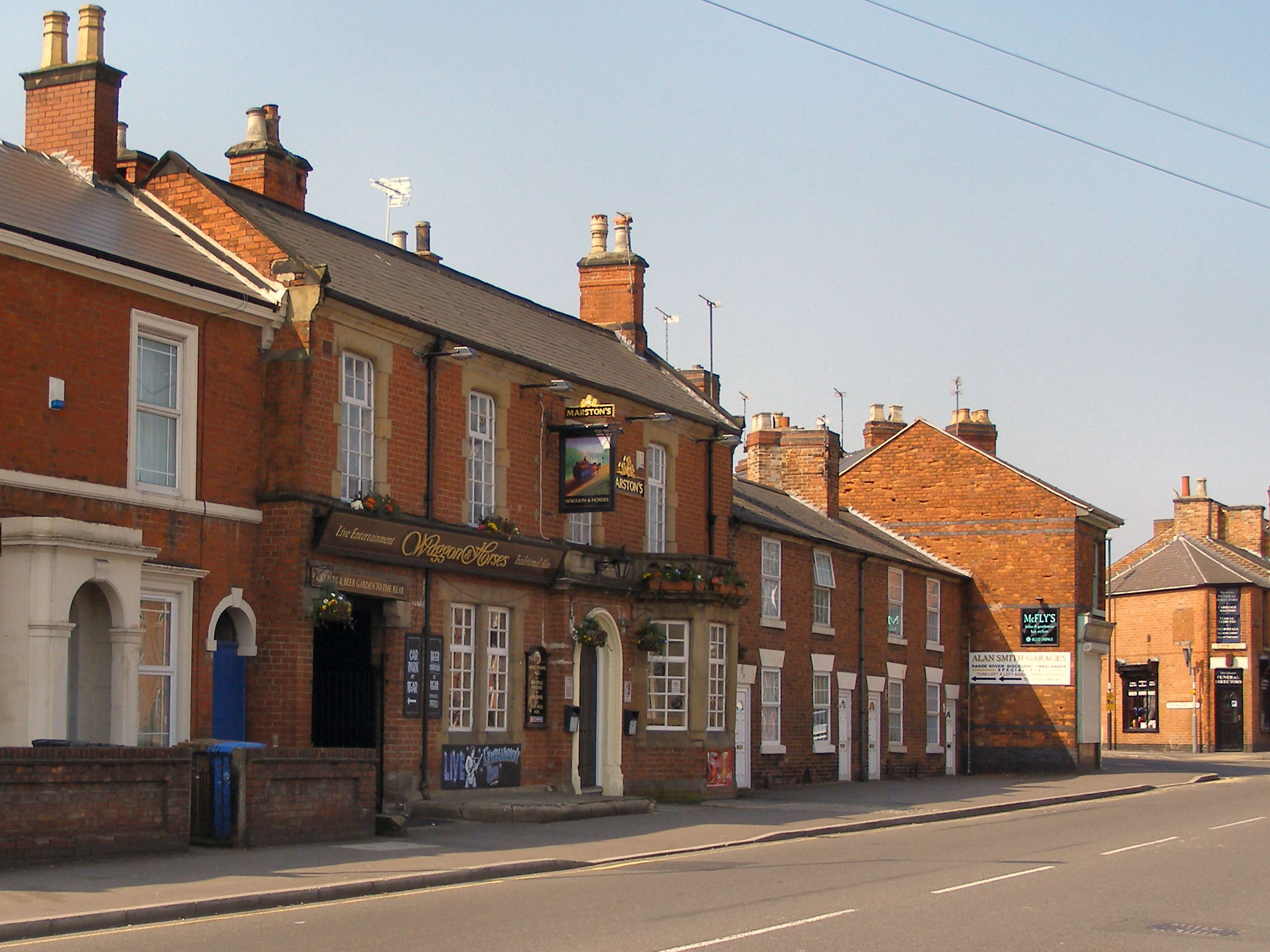
The former Waggon and Horses on Ashbourne Road before it was closed

== Places of worship ==
- Derby Christadelphians - Bass Street
- Saint Barnabas Church of England Church - Bass Street/Radbourne Street
- The Church of Jesus Christ of Latter Day Saints - Radbourne Street

== Recreation grounds - public parks ==
- Handford Street
- Cheviot Street - Entrance opposite junction of Cheviot Street and Mackenzie Street also opposite junction of Hawke Street and Cheviot Street.

== Notable residents ==
- Frank Conroy - Born in Derby on 14 October 1890 at 33 Heyworth Street - died Paramus, New Jersey, USA on 24 February 1964, aged 73. Went on to become a Hollywood actor.
- Patricia Greene (MBE) - actress. As a child she lived in Campion Street and went to Ashgate Infants School on Ashbourne Road. Today she still appears in BBC Radio 'The Archers' as Jill Archer and has appeared in it since 1957.
- Richard Keene - photographer. Founding member of the Derby Photographic Society in 1884 and the Photographic Convention of the United Kingdom in 1886. In 1891 was living in 100 Radbourne Street.
- Lord Tunnicliffe - (Dennis Tunnicliffe) - (Labour Peer) Born and Raised on Cheviot Street (Morley Estate) until aged 18. Brought up to Peerage as Baron Tunnicliffe, of Bracknell in the Royal County of Berkshire 2004
