= Derby Tramways Company =

Tramway service in Derby, England (1880–1904)

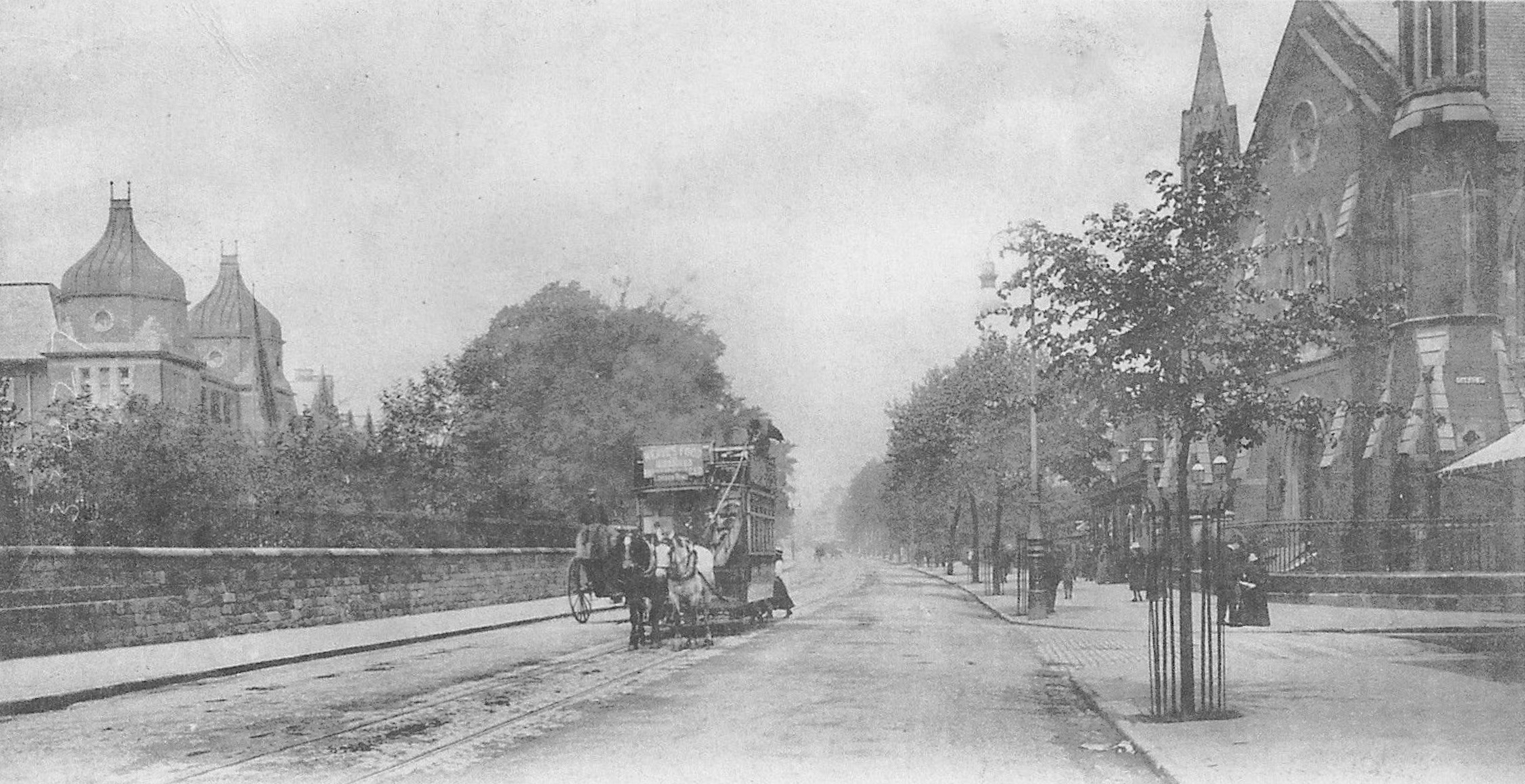
- Tram on London Road, Derby ca. 1895

Operation
- Locale: Derby, Derbyshire, England
Horsecar era: 1880–1907
Status	Closed
Operator	Derby Tramways Company
Track gauge	4 ft (1,219 mm)
Propulsion system	Horses

The Derby Tramways Company operated horse-drawn tramway services in Derby, England from 1880 to 1904.

== History ==
Saint Peter's Street Derby, Trams and Hurd and Dean shop, say circa 1895

The registration of the Derby Tramways Company took place in October 1877. In November 1879 it was reported that navvies were laying down the tracks in London Road. The innovation was not welcomed by all the residents of the town. An article appeared in the Derbyshire Times and Chesterfield Herald on 15 November 1879 which read:

The Derby Tramway Company have got their works in busy construction. London road and St Peter’s street, which cost the suffering ratepayers a stiff sum in renewal only a short time since, and which had got splendidly consolidated, are being ruthlessly torn up by the invaders. They seem to take possession of as much road as possible, and are not adverse to depositing their plant on a slice of the pavement. Steaming black kettles of pitch - more obnoxious that the Witches caldrons in Macbeth - fill the air with smoke and stench. The tram rails are of steel, laid on cast iron chairs placed, barely an inch apart, on a bed of solid concrete, paved with granite sets. In a short space of time the tinkle of the bell of the tramcar will be heard on the road. The busses are, of course, doomed. But the Tram Car Company take over the Derby Omnibus Company, Limited. This will surely handicap the first year’s profits of the concern; but the arbitrary condition was adroitly imposed by the Corporation, several members which are interested in the ‘Buss Company. “Veels within veels, Samivel.” What compensation do the proprietors of the private ‘busses, Messrs. Horsly and Hunt, get for their “vested interests,” I wonder?

The trams arrived in Derby in January 1880. The tramway was inspected by Major Hutchinson of the Board of Trade on 3 March 1880. The initial service was provided with four tramcars, each hauled by one horse, except for the stretch along St Peter's Street where an additional horse was attached. The horses had bells attached to their collars. The first line opened on 6 March 1880 from the Market Place along St. Peter's Street to Midland Railway station. Further lines on Osmaston Road and Friar Gate lines had a total length of about two and a half miles. The lines were laid by Messrs. Mousley & Co. The Ashbourne road extension was opened on 1 October 1880, and the Osmaston extension was opened on 8 October 1880.

At their general meeting in 1881, the company reported that total receipts from 6 March to 31 December 1880 were £4,924 12s 1d (equivalent to £490,200 in 2023), with expenditure of £3,575 2s 11d (equivalent to £355,900 in 2023), leaving a profit of £1,349 9s 2d (equivalent to £134,300 in 2023). They had carried 470,547 passengers, on tramway along 3 miles, 1 furlong, 5 chains of streets. There were two depots, one adjoining the arches of the Great Northern Railway which accommodated 87 horses and 21 cars, and the other near the Midland Railway station which accommodated 20 horses and five cars. The total fleet was 69 horses, 12 cars, and 8 omnibuses. The directors considered a petition from 6,000 residents of Derby objecting to running on Sunday, but decided not to suspend Sunday services.

The fourth extension of the tramway from the Royal Hotel along Normanton Road to the Normanton Hotel was opened on 27 May 1881. In June 1881 the company provided an extension to serve the Royal Agricultural Show. The Normanton and Osmanton extensions provided disappointing financially, and at the general meeting in 1882 the directors had resolved to resist calls to extend the tramway along the Uttoxeter Road, and the powers had lapsed. The directors experimented with reducing fares from 2d (equivalent to £0.84 in 2023) to 1.5d (equivalent to £0.63 in 2023). The receipts for 1881 were £8,254 8s 4d (equivalent to £830,500 in 2023), with expenses of £6,866 19s 10d (equivalent to £692,900 in 2023). The number of passengers carried was 907,892. There were 65 horses and 16 cars.

== Depot ==
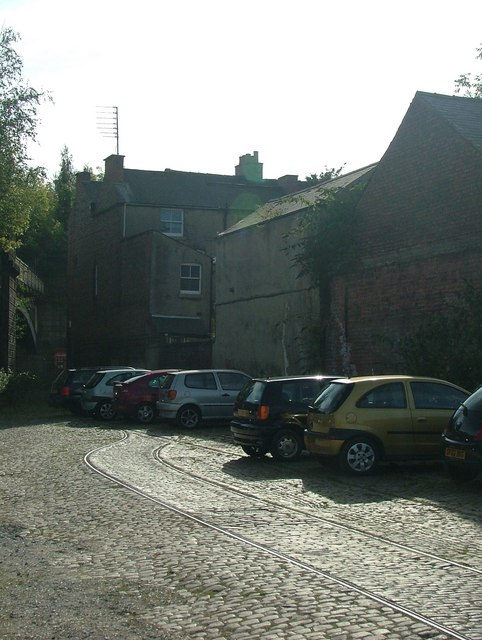
The remains of the depot in Short Street

The main depot was in Friar Gate, on Short Street, with a small depot near Derby Midland station at the junction of Midland Road and Carrington Street. Tramlines can still be seen at the Short STreet site as of 2022.

== Fleet ==
The initial rolling stock consisted of single-deck cars by Starbuck Car and Wagon Company (Nos. 1–16), and double-deck cars (Nos. 17-18 of 1887 and 19-20 of 1894).

== Officers ==
=== General Managers ===
- William Spawton 1880 - 1897
- Frank Harding 1897 - 1898 (afterwards general manager of Derby Corporation Tramways)

== Closure ==
Derby Corporation Tramways, &c. Act 1899
- Act of Parliament
- Parliament of the United Kingdom
- Long title: An Act to empower the Corporation of Derby to acquire and work the undertaking of the Derby Tramways Company Limited to confer further powers on the Corporation with reference to the government of the Borough and for other purposes.
- Citation: 62 & 63 Vict. c. cxciii

Dates
- Royal assent: 1 August 1899

Other legislation
- Repealed by: Derbyshire Act 1981

Status: Repealed

With the Derby Corporation Tramways, &c. Act 1899 (62 & 63 Vict. c. cxciii) the corporation purchased the existing company and on 1 November 1899 took control of the services. The Derby Corporation Act 1901 gave them powers to construct new lines and electrify the existing lines as Derby Corporation Tramways.
