= Wilmorton =

Coordinates: 52.907°N 1.445°W

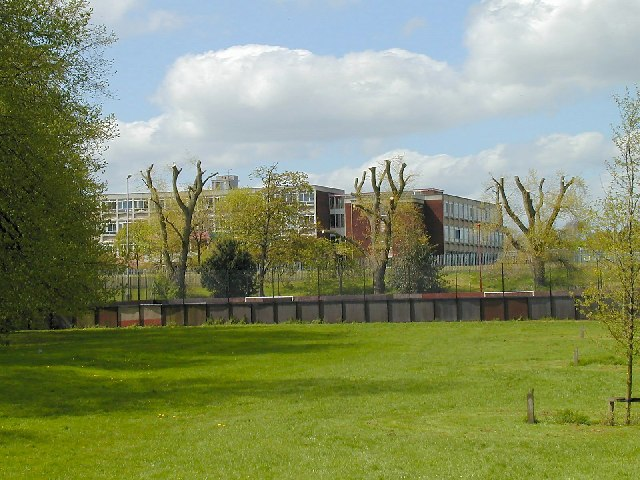
- Wilmorton College in 2005, before the land was reused

- Location within Derbyshire
- Unitary authority: Derby
- Ceremonial county: Derbyshire
- Region: East Midlands
- Country: England
- Sovereign state: United Kingdom
- Post town: DERBY
- Postcode district: DE24
- Dialling code: 01332
- Police: Derbyshire
- Fire: Derbyshire
- Ambulance: East Midlands
- UK Parliament: Derby South

Wilmorton is a suburb of the city of Derby, in the ceremonial county of Derbyshire, England, which lies between Alvaston and Osmaston, to the south of the city centre on the A6 from Deadman's Lane to the Canal Bridge. The area was formed out of the Osmaston Hall estate which was broken up in the 1880s, and was given its name by the post office in 1887 after Sir George Wilmot-Horton, 5th Baronet, of Osmaston.

In 1796, the Derby Canal was built through Wilmorton which helped to bring trade to this area. The canal was closed in 1964 and converted to a cycle track, but work is being undertaken to restore it. A local public house next to the canal, named The Navigation, was originally built in 1796 when the canal opened, and re-built in 1895 to a design by the Derby architect James Wright. The other public house in Wilmorton is the Portland Hotel; this is on the corner of the London Road and Dickinson Street.

Most of the original houses were built by the Midland Railway Company. A school was opened in 1893, and in 1904 a church in red brick dedicated to Saint Osmund was constructed.

Behind the housing the London Midland and Scottish Railway Company constructed a railway college in 1937 in a neoclassical style; this is now known as Derby Conference Centre. Wilmorton campus of Derby College was built off Harrow Street (known as Derby College of Further Education and then Derby Tertiary College) and in around 2006 this was knocked down and redeveloped as housing, known as City Point. Some of the college facilities were transferred to a site on Nottingham Road called Mason's Place, and some to the main site in Mackworth. In the late 1990s, a new section of the A6 was built from here to "The Cockpitt" roundabout, passing through Pride Park, known as Pride Parkway.
