= Shelton Lock =

Coordinates: 52.877982°N 1.44199°W

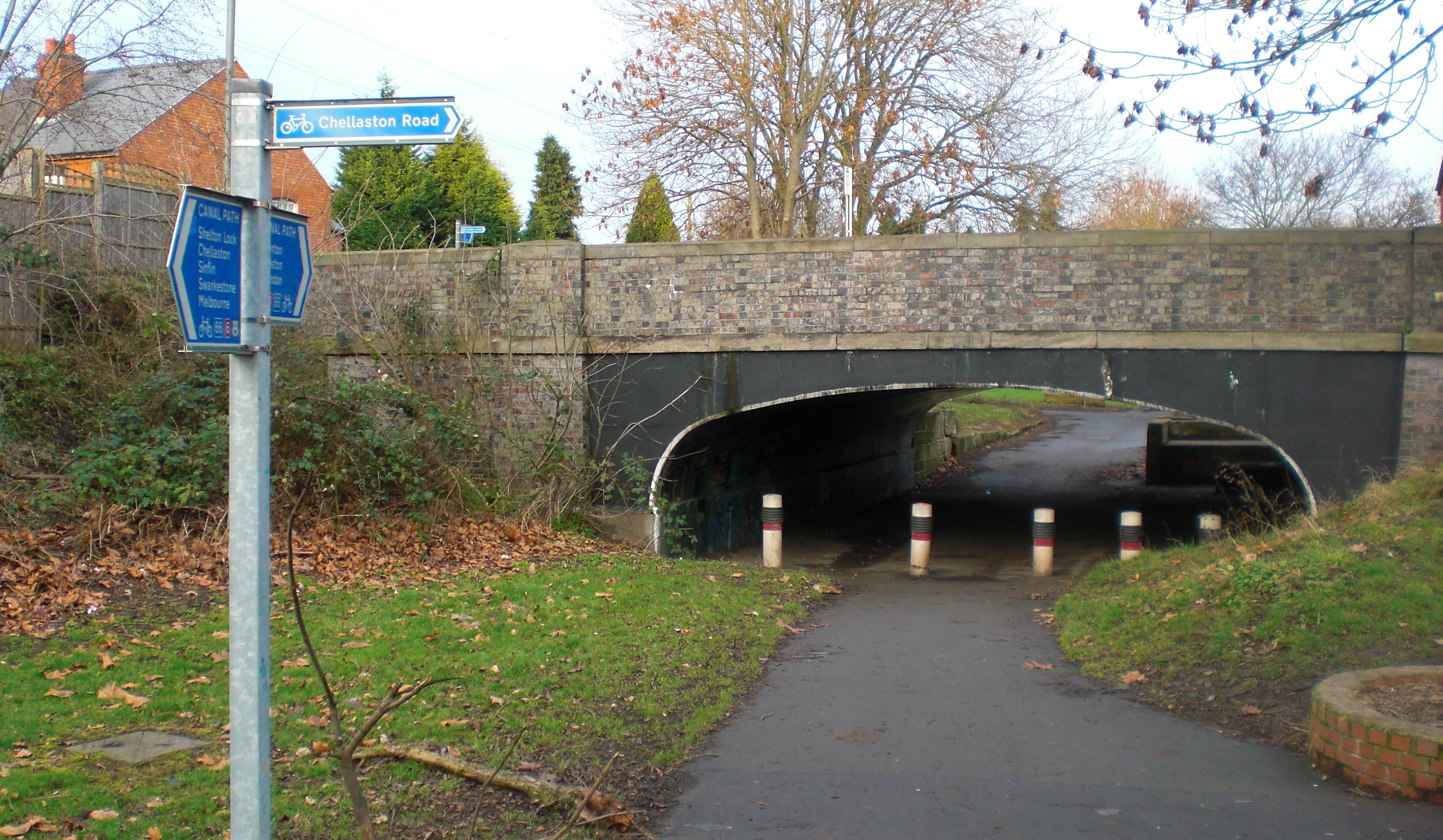
- Shelton Lock bridge

- Location within Derbyshire
- OS grid reference: SK375313
- Unitary authority: Derby
- Ceremonial county: Derbyshire
- Region: East Midlands
- Country: England
- Sovereign state: United Kingdom
- Post town: DERBY
- Postcode district: DE24
- Dialling code: 01332
- Police: Derbyshire
- Fire: Derbyshire
- Ambulance: East Midlands
- UK Parliament: Derby South

Shelton Lock is a suburb in the south of the city of Derby, Derbyshire, England, located between Chellaston and Allenton.

The area gets its name from the lock on the Derby Canal that once ran through the area. The only traces of the canal's existence are seen in the form of a road bridge, the lock stones, and a cycle path which covers it. The canal was shut in the 1960s but there are plans to re-excavate it. The site of Fullen's Lock is located just a few hundred yards along the present-day cycle path from Shelton Lock bridge, and a children's playground close to the site still bears the name.

Merrill College is the local secondary school. It was located on Jubilee Road but was demolished – the new Merrill College is in Allenton (the old Thomas Moore school). The area also has an infant and junior school. The Full Circle Centre is the local scout hut on Sinfin Avenue that is home to 1st Shelton Lock Scouts & Guides. Chellaston Road is the main road through the area, where a lot of inter-war private housing can be found.

The George V Jubilee Estate was built in 1935 to commemorate King George V's silver jubilee and this lies to the west of Jubilee Road. St Edmund’s Church on Sinfin Avenue by the Derby architect Arthur Eaton was opened in 1939. The Sinfin Avenue estate was built in the 1970s, and includes a number of council and private houses. To the rear of the estate are fields and woodland, which are part of Sinfin Moor – as well as the disused railway which goes towards Chellaston. Significant areas of these fields and woodland have now been built on forming the Bonnie Prince housing estate.

A spur of the M64 motorway was planned to pass through this area towards the Rolls-Royce works. This was never built and the route was instead used for the A50 road; Shelton Lock is connected to this by the A514.

== Gallery ==
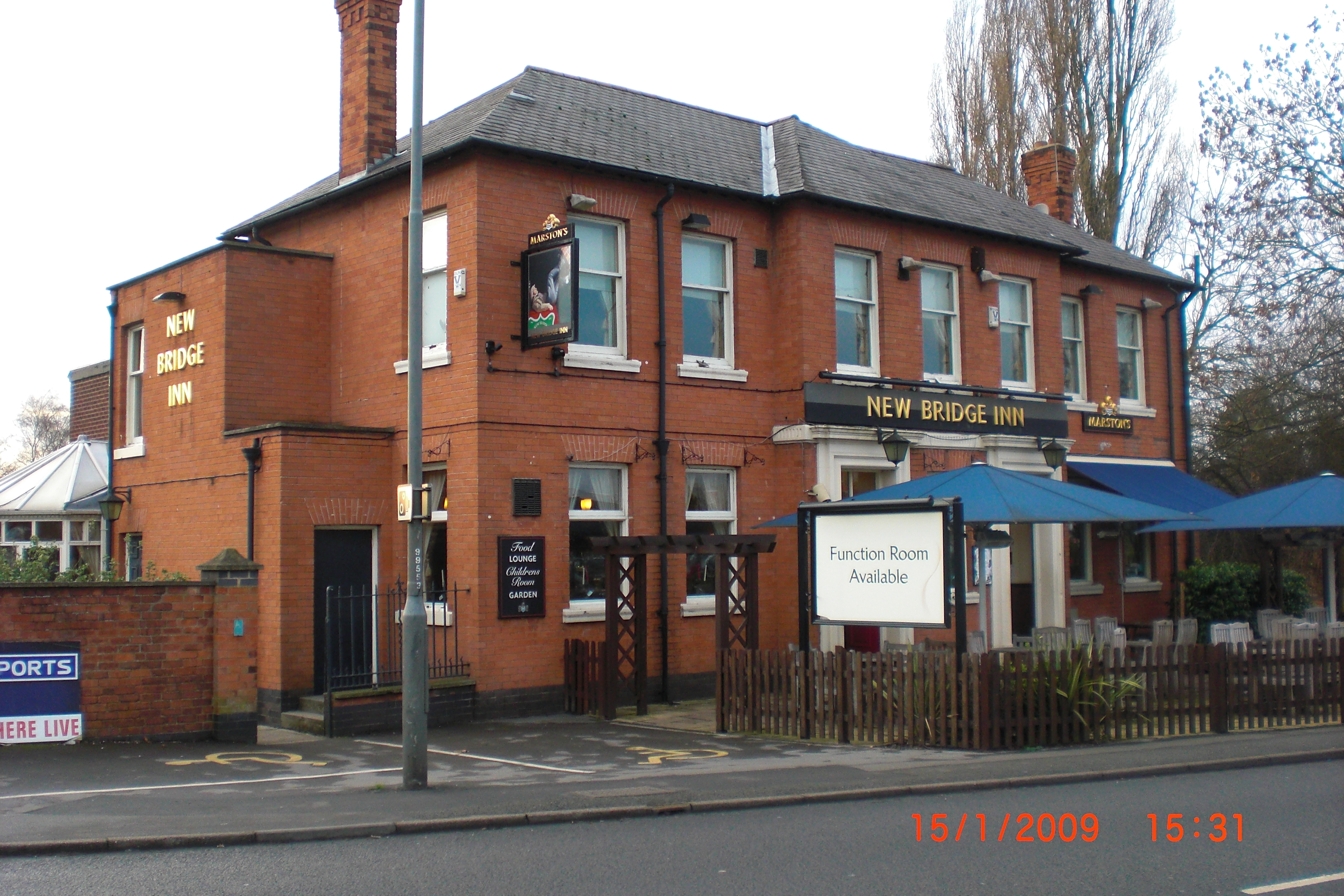
The New Bridge Inn public house

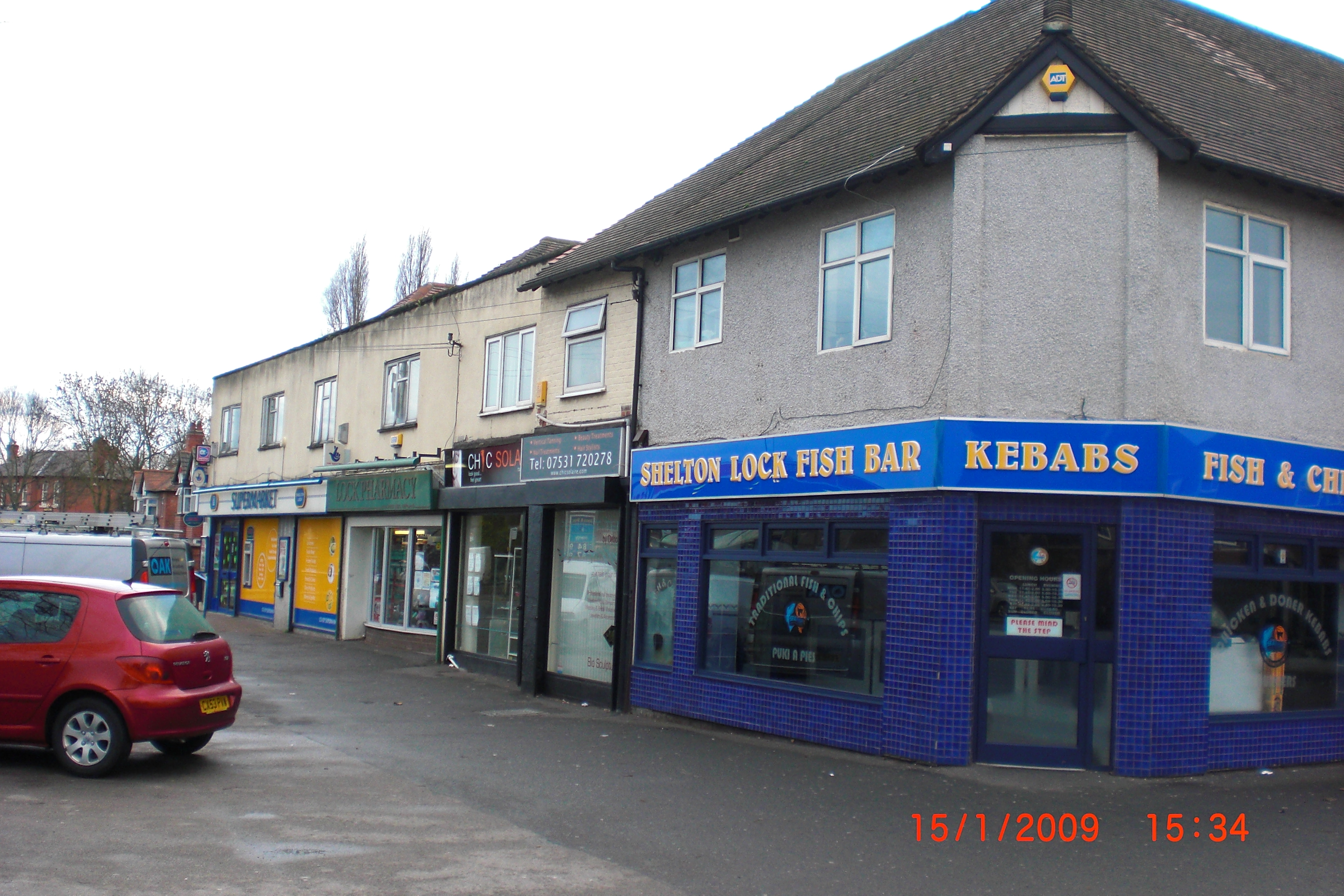
The shops, Chellaston Road

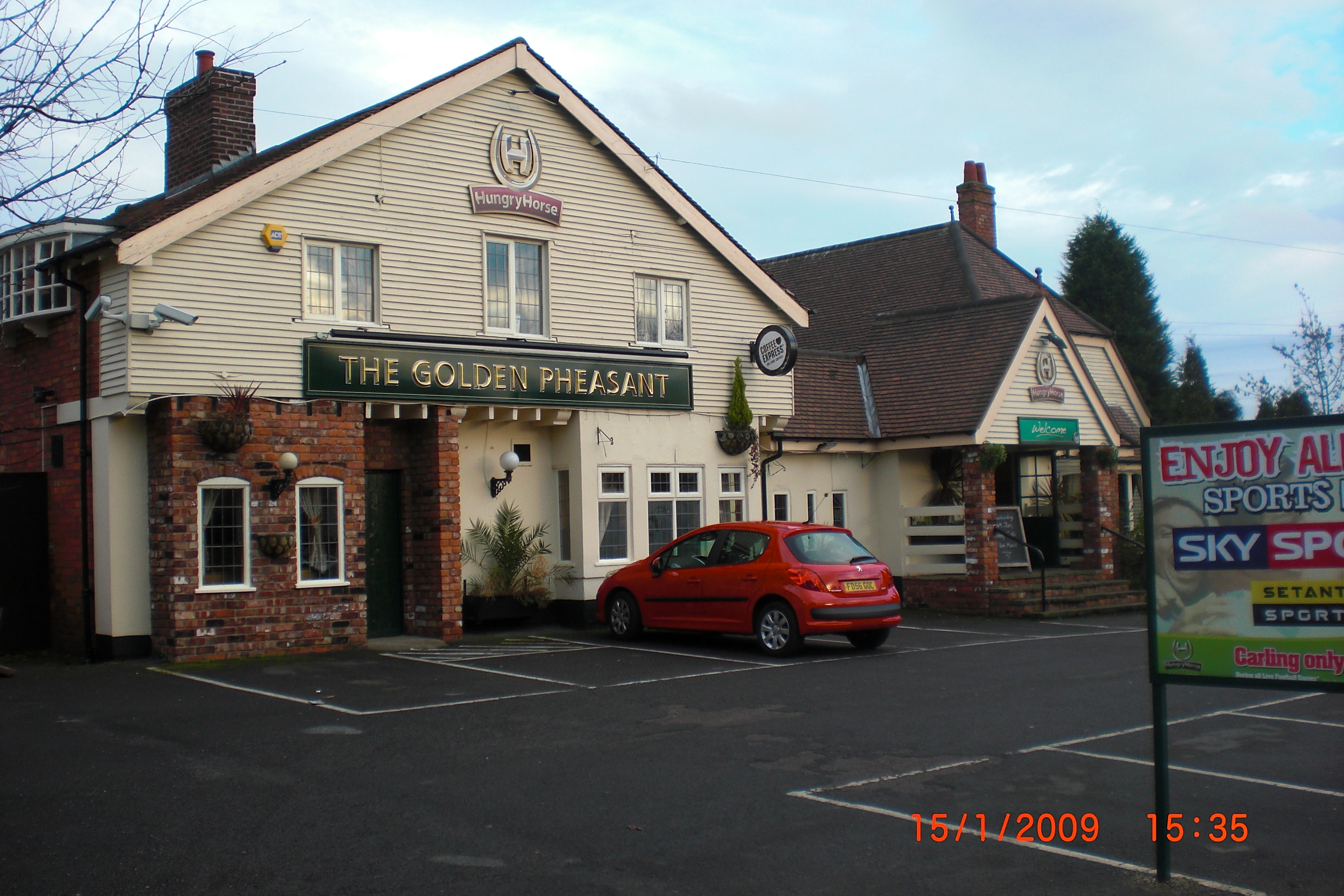
The Golden Pheasant public house

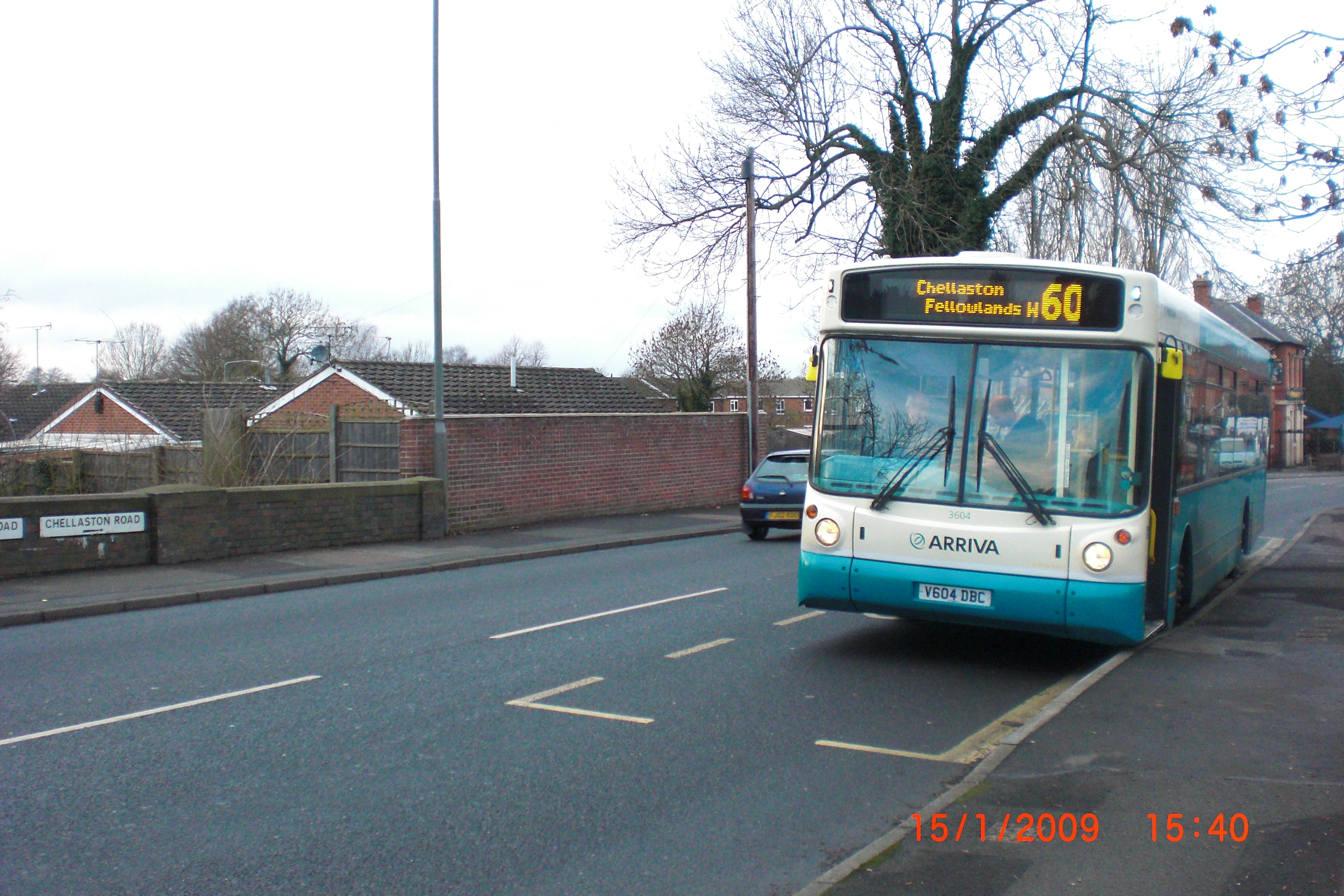
Number 60 bus travelling from Derby to Chellaston, on Shelton Lock bridge
