= Bregu i Diellit =

District of Pristina, Kosovo

Coordinates: 42°39′01″N 21°10′13″E

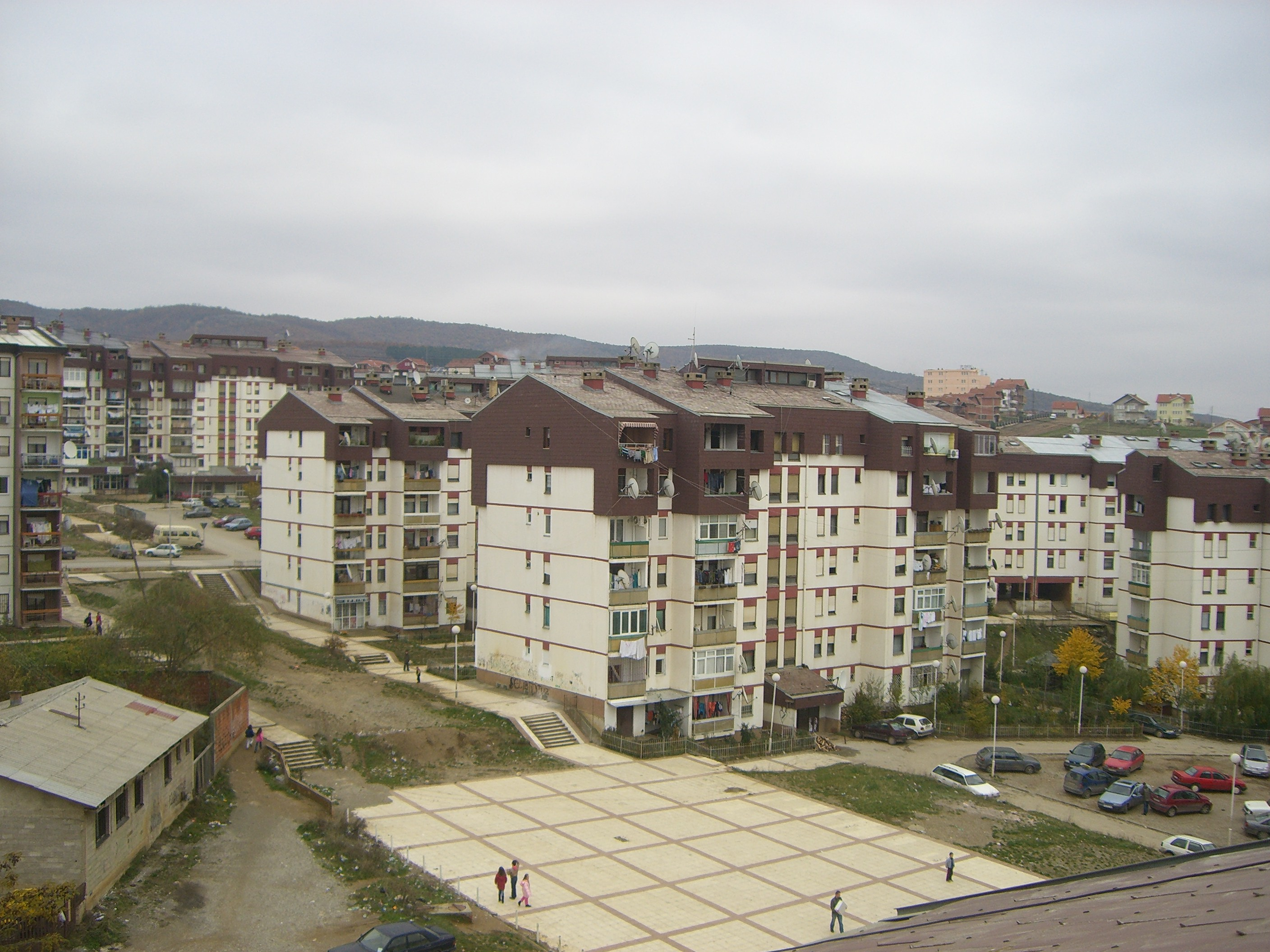
Bregu i Diellit 2

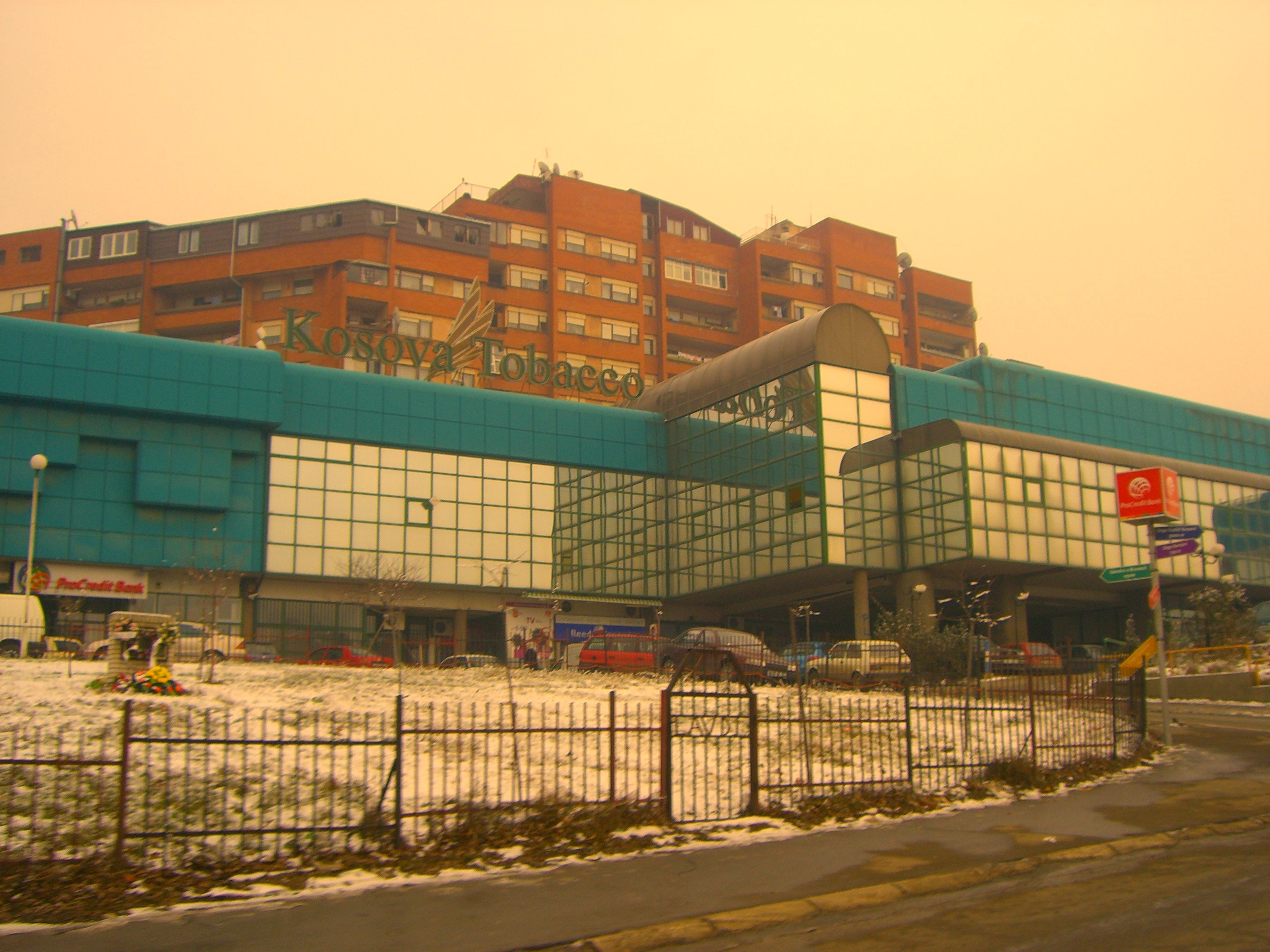
Shopping mall "Bregu i Diellit"

Bregu i Diellit (Sunny Shore) also informally known as Kodra e Diellit (Sunny Hill), is a district of Pristina, the capital of Kosovo.

An interesting fact about the Sunny Hill district is its connection to Dua Lipa, as it is the area of Prishtina where she grew up. This connection also inspired the name of the annual festival she organizes, the Sunny Hill Festival.

== Schools ==
- Shf. Iliria – located in Bregu i Diellit 2
- Shf.Ismail Qemaili – located in Kodra e Diellit
