= California, Derby =

Area of Derby, Derbyshire, England

Coordinates: 52.917°N 1.494°W

California
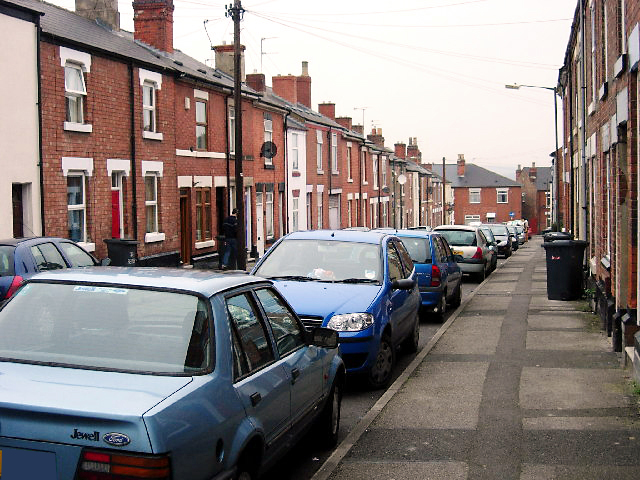
- Terraced houses in California

- Location within Derbyshire
- OS grid reference: SK341356
- Unitary authority: Derby
- Ceremonial county: Derbyshire
- Region: East Midlands
- Country: England
- Sovereign state: United Kingdom
- Post town: DERBY
- Postcode district: DE22
- Police: Derbyshire
- Fire: Derbyshire
- Ambulance: East Midlands

California is an inner-city area of Derby, in Derbyshire, England, to the south west of the city in between the A516 (Uttoxeter New Road) and A5250 (Burton Road). It is part of the Abbey ward.

== History ==
The name California first appears on local maps from the 1880s, and may derive from the California Gold Rush of 1849, but the reason for such an association is unclear.

2 regular bus routes run through the area which are:

- Arriva Derby 5A - Derby > Rose Hill > Littleover > Sunnyhill > Royal Derby Hospital > St Lukes > Derby
- Notts and Derby Link 2 - Royal Derby Hospital > Mickleover > Mackworth Estate > Royal Derby Hospital

== Amenities ==
The area is home to Bemrose Community School and some of the halls of residence for the University of Derby. There are two playing fields nearby; Stockbrook Park and Rykneld Recreation Ground ('The Rec'). Many of the houses in the area are red brick terraces and there are many pubs nearby, including the Junction Tavern, the Rowditch and the Bedford Arms.

Towards the south of the area is neighbouring Rowditch district which is home to a large student population. Whilst many of the nearby inner-suburbs of Derby including the West End and Morley Estate have undergone recent gentrification, California has largely retained its traditional character.
