= List of schools in Derby =

This is a list of schools in Derby, in the English county of Derbyshire.

== State-funded schools ==
=== Primary schools ===
- Akaal Primary school
- Allenton Primary School
- Alvaston Infant School
- Alvaston Junior Academy
- Arboretum Primary School
- Ash Croft Primary Academy
- Ashgate Primary School
- Ashwood Spencer Academy
- Asterdale Primary School
- Beaufort Community Primary School
- Becket Primary School
- The Bemrose School
- Bishop Lonsdale CE Primary School
- Borrow Wood Primary School
- Brackensdale Spencer Academy
- Breadsall Hill Top Primary School
- Brookfield Primary School
- Carlyle Infant Academy
- Castleward Spencer Academy
- Cavendish Close Infant School
- Cavendish Close Junior Academy
- Chaddesden Park Primary School
- Chellaston Infant School
- Chellaston Junior School
- Cherry Tree Hill Primary School
- Cottons Farm Primary Academy
- Dale Community Primary School
- Derby St Chad's CE Infant School
- Derwent Primary School
- Firs Primary School
- Gayton Junior School
- Grampian Primary Academy
- Griffe Field Primary School
- Hackwood Primary Academy
- Hardwick Primary School
- Homefields Primary School
- Lakeside Primary Academy
- Landau Forte Academy Moorhead
- Lawn Primary School
- Markeaton Primary School
- Meadow Farm Community Primary School
- Mickleover Primary School
- Oak Grange Primary School
- Oakwood Infant School
- Oakwood Junior School
- Parkview Primary School
- Pear Tree Community Junior School
- Pear Tree Infant School
- Portway Infant School
- Portway Junior School
- Ravensdale Infant School
- Ravensdale Junior School
- Redwood Primary School
- Reigate Park Primary Academy
- Ridgeway Infant School
- Roe Farm Primary School
- Rosehill Infant School
- St Alban's RC Academy
- St George's RC Academy
- St James' CE Infant School
- St James' CE Junior School
- St John Fisher RC Academy
- St Joseph's RC Academy
- St Mary's RC Academy
- St Peter's CE Junior School
- St Werburgh's CE Primary School
- Shelton Infant School
- Shelton Junior School
- Silverhill Primary School
- Springfield Primary School
- Village Primary Academy
- Walter Evans CE Primary School
- Wren Park Primary School
- Wyndham Primary Academy
- Zaytouna Primary School

=== Secondary schools ===
- Allestree Woodlands School
- Alvaston Moor Academy
- The Bemrose School
- Chellaston Academy
- City of Derby Academy
- Da Vinci Academy
- Derby Cathedral School
- Derby Moor Academy
- Landau Forte College
- Lees Brook Community School
- Littleover Community School
- Murray Park School
- Noel-Baker Academy
- Saint Benedict Catholic Voluntary Academy
- UTC Derby Pride Park
- West Park School

=== Special and alternative schools ===
- Derby Pride Academy
- Ivy House School
- Kingsmead School
- Newton's Walk
- St Andrew's Academy
- St Clare's School
- St Giles' School
- St Martin's School

=== Further education ===
- Buxton & Leek College
- Derby College

== Independent schools ==
=== Primary and preparatory schools ===
- Emmanuel School

=== Senior and all-through schools ===
- Derby Grammar School
- Derby High School
- Normanton House School
- Old Vicarage School

=== Special and alternative schools ===
- Jasmine Hall School
- Maple View School
- Royal School for the Deaf Derby
- Spring Valley School
