= Normanton, Derby =

Suburb of Derby, England

Coordinates: 52.899°N 1.483°W

Normanton
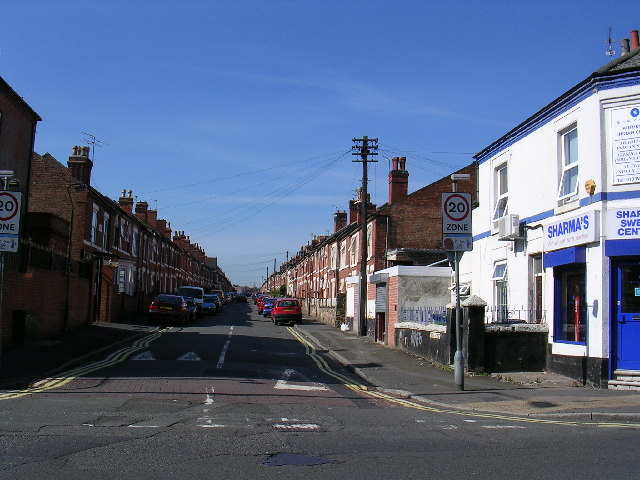
- Crewe Street, a typical Victorian terraced street in Normanton

- Location within Derbyshire
- OS grid reference: SK345340
- Unitary authority: Derby
- Ceremonial county: Derbyshire
- Region: East Midlands
- Country: England
- Sovereign state: United Kingdom
- Post town: DERBY
- Postcode district: DE23
- Dialling code: 01332
- Police: Derbyshire
- Fire: Derbyshire
- Ambulance: East Midlands
- UK Parliament: Derby South

Normanton is an inner city suburb and ward of the city of Derby in Derbyshire, England, situated approximately 2 miles (3.2 km) south of the city centre. Neighbouring suburbs include Littleover, Pear Tree, Rose Hill and Sunny Hill. The original village of Normanton-by-Derby, which now forms the southern part of the suburb, dates back to the medieval period. As the Normanton area became rapidly urbanised in the 19th century, the New Normanton area to the north was developed for housing, linking the old village to Derby, into which it was eventually absorbed. The area is characterised by high density late 19th century terraced housing in New Normanton and mid-20th century housing estates elsewhere, and has the most ethnically diverse population in Derby. The Normanton ward had a population of 17,071 in 2011.

== History ==
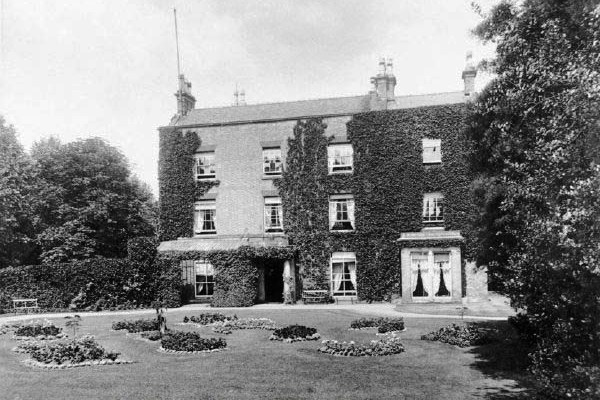
Normanton Hall was built in the 1740s

The modern suburb grew from an ancient village, formerly known as Normanton-by-Derby. The area is thought to have been the site of one of the major Viking settlements in the Derby area, hence the original name, Normanestune, which means Norseman's settlement. Normanestune is mentioned twice in the Domesday Book, once recording the lands of the king, William the Conqueror, and again for land belonging to Henry de Ferrers when it was valued at ten shillings.

The location of the original village lies just south of the modern ring road, its main thoroughfare commemorated by the present day Village Street. St Giles' Parish Church stands on Village Street, atop a slight hill, and its spire can be seen across most of the district. In the 1740s the Dixie family had Normanton Hall built; this was later used as a school building in the 20th century.

The portion of the district to the north of the ring road is called New Normanton. The area began to urbanise rapidly in the mid 19th century, Normanton eventually being absorbed by the expansion of Derby's boundaries up to the 1930s. Much of the housing stock in the area is typical Victorian brick terracing.

== Government ==
Normanton is one of the seventeen wards which make up Derby, and as such elects three councillors to Derby City Council. Some parts of Normanton fall outside the ward boundaries; for example Normanton Road and much of New Normanton are in the Arboretum ward, while the area around Carlton Road is in Abbey ward. The ward forms part of the Derby South constituency of the United Kingdom parliament.

Normanton was formerly a civil parish within Shardlow Rural District. In 1921 the parish had a population of 1383. The New Normanton part of the parish (roughly the area north of the modern inner ring road) was annexed by the town in 1901. On 28 March 1928 the parish was abolished most of the parish becoming part of Derby, with some areas transferring to the adjacent parishes of Littleover and Sinfin Moor, it became part of the county borough of Derby.

== Demographics ==
According to the 2011 Census, the Normanton ward had a population of 17,071. This was a 26.4% increase on the 2001 Census figure of 13,506.

The area has a high ethnic minority population, with the largest concentration of Derby's British Asian community. In 2011, 67% of the population was estimated to be non-White British, compared to a figure of 25% for the whole of Derby. Around 43% of the ward population is from an Asian background, with the largest minority community being British Pakistanis at 27% of the total population. The neighbouring Arboretum ward, which includes parts of Normanton, has very similar figures, and is also 67% non-White British, including 41% of Asian origin, of which 31% are Pakistani British. The area has also had a large influx of eastern Europeans settle in the area.

== Religion ==
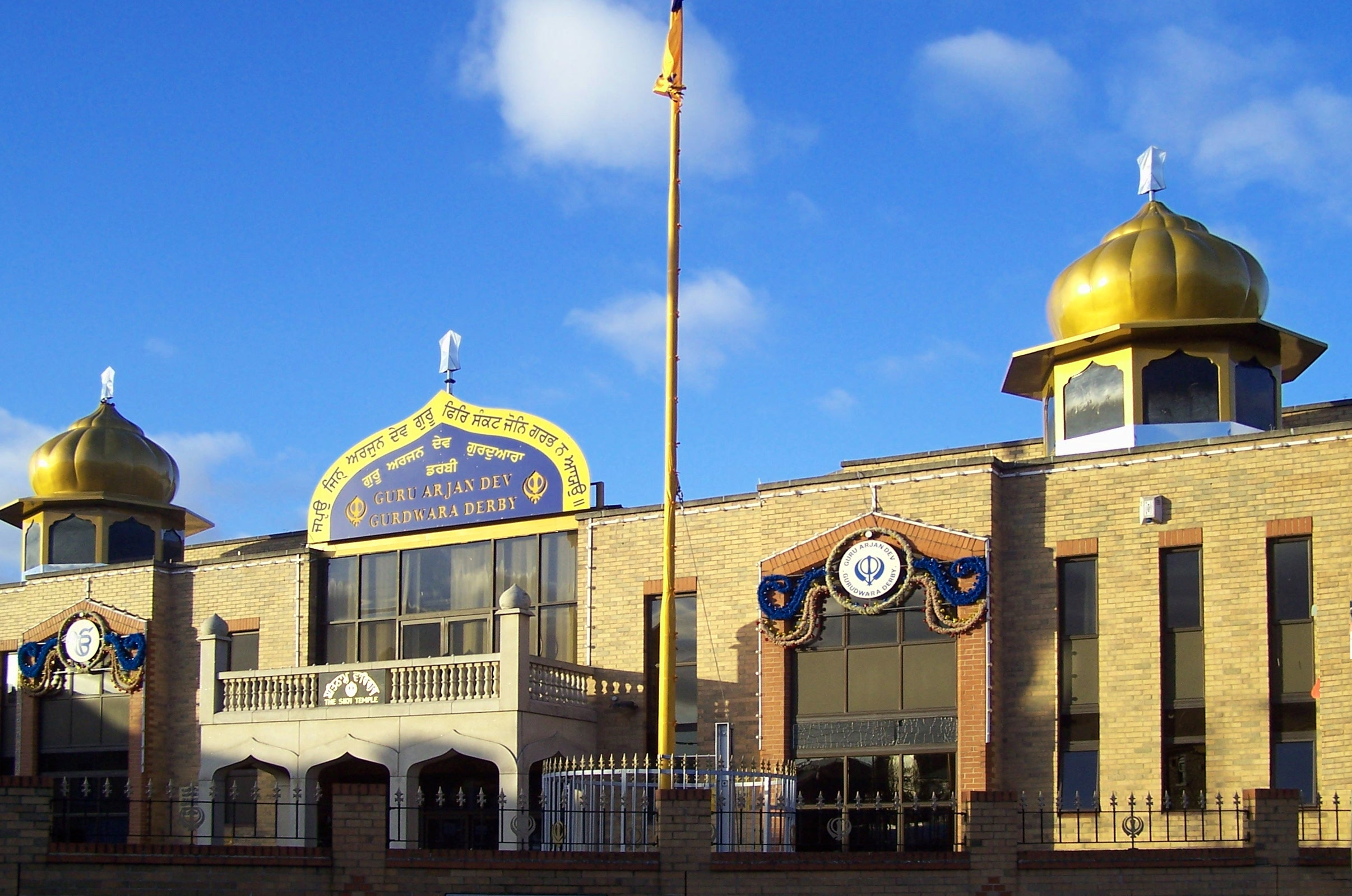
The Guru Arjan Dev Gurdwara on Stanhope Street

Normanton has a wide number of places of worship, including the Guru Arjan Dev Gurdwara on Stanhope Street, the Singh Sabha Gurdwara on Prince's Street, the Ramgarhia Gurdwara on St. James's Street and the Guru Ravidass Gurdwara on Duncan Road. There are also many mosques in Normanton such as Masjid Assalaam on Pear Tree Road, Masjid Ahl-e-Hadith on Hastings Street, Masjid-e-Khulafa-e-Rashedeen on Cameron Road, Derby Jamia Mosque on Rosehill Street and Dairy House Road, and Masjid Al-Farooq on Mill Hill Lane. There is also a Hindu temple, Geeta Bhawan Mandir on Pear Tree Road. There are various Christian churches meeting in the area, from mainstream Anglican and Roman Catholic congregations to free churches and newer house churches. There is a Polish church off St Chad's Road, a Ukrainian church off Dairy House Road, and a Serbian church off Dale Road.

The local Sikh community organise an annual Vaisakhi parade around Normanton from the gurdwara. The 2012 event attracted between ten and fifteen thousand people.

== Landmarks ==
A prominent local landmark was once the Normanton Barracks, headquarters of the Sherwood Foresters regiment. The perimeter of the Barracks comprised an imposing and substantial 4-metre high red brick wall with the barrack's internal buildings only just visible from atop a double decker 38 Sinfin to Derby bus. Most of the wall, and many buildings, remained when the site was quit by the army and became a small industrial estate in the mid-1960s. It was all, however, demolished in 1981, and the site is now the Foresters Leisure Park, including the Showcase cinema, some fast food restaurants, a bingo hall, and a bowling alley. At the north west corner of the original Barracks site is now the Oast House pub, a distinctive modern building which is, as the name suggests, in the style of a traditional English oast house a type of structure totally incongruous to this part of the country. Just along the ring road on Village Street is the church that served the Garrison, St Giles', where there are numerous memorials to the Sherwood Foresters. For quite some time after the MOD left the Barracks and before the site was developed the premises were used by a variety of small businesses including small engineering firms, repair, and vehicle spray shops along with storage facilities. The parade ground remained a revered focal point during that time.

A former landmark in the Normanton area was the church on St Chad's Road; however, this was demolished in the mid-1990s and the area is now used as a playing field for children attending St Chad's School. There is now a 'Faith Centre' next to the playing field.

== Community facilities ==
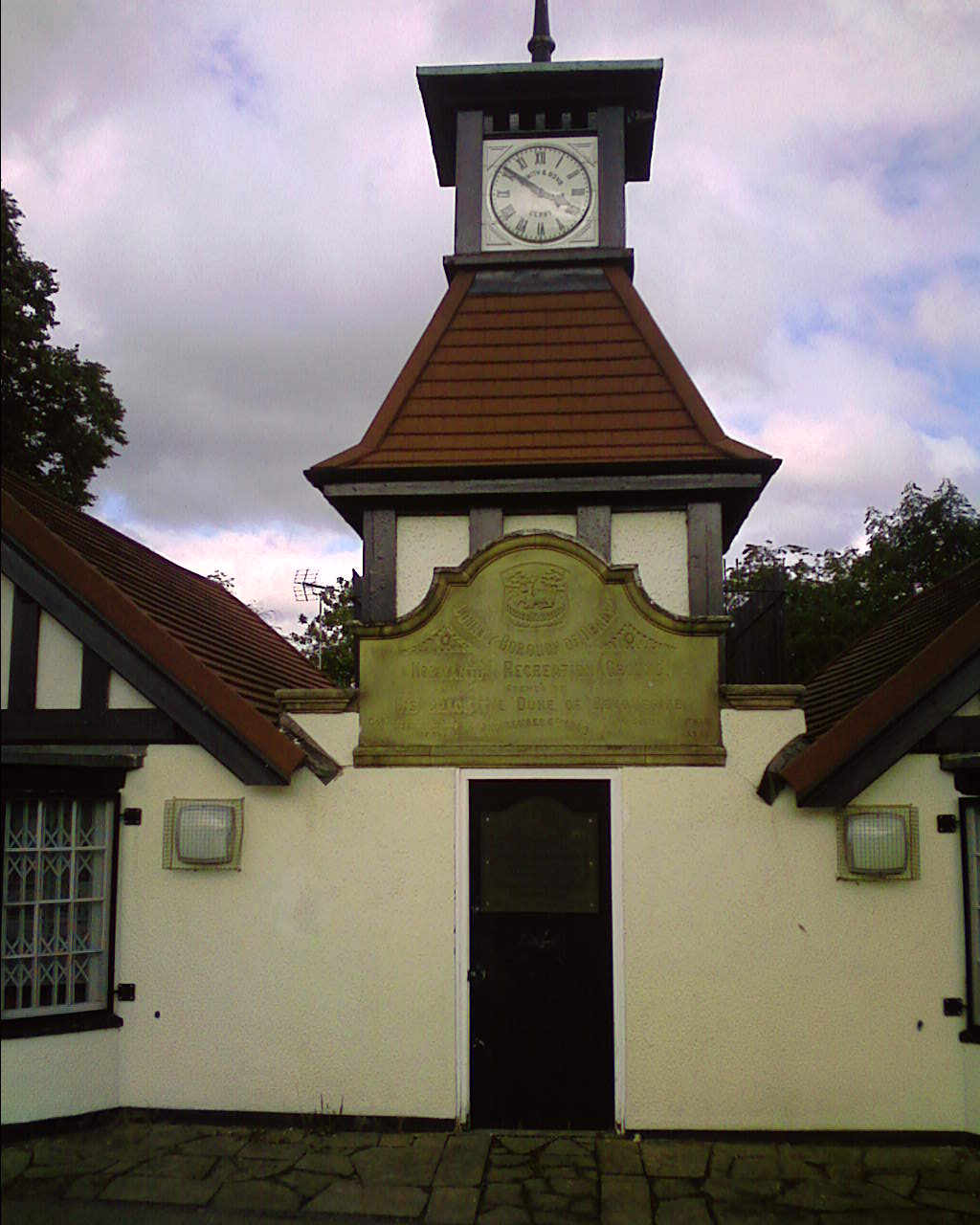
Clock tower in Normanton Park

The area's main public recreational facility is Normanton Park; it was opened in 1909, as recorded on the café clock tower. The park links the old village of Normanton and the modern New Normanton area. Facilities include a children's play area and a community building. Sunny Hill Recreation Ground and Sherwood Recreation Ground are also situated in Normanton ward. Other parks located outside the ward, but serving the Normanton area, include Derby Arboretum in Rose Hill and Sunnydale Park in Littleover.

== Education ==
Three primary schools are located in the Normanton ward: Dale Community Primary, Hardwick Primary and Village Primary. Other nearby primary schools whose catchment areas cover parts of Normanton include Arboretum, Pear Tree, St. Chad's and St. James'. There are no secondary schools within the area, which is covered by the catchment areas for the Bemrose School, the City of Derby Academy, Derby Moor Community Sports College and Littleover Community School.

== Sport ==
The Derbyshire Tennis Centre is adjacent to Normanton Park.

The Baseball Ground was built in the northern part of Normanton in 1890, first being the home of Derby Baseball Club until they were disbanded in 1898. It remained open for the next 105 years, however, as Derby County Football Club had played football matches there since 1895 and despite the relocation of the first team to the new Pride Park Stadium in 1997, it remained in use until May 2003 for the club's reserve and youth sides. The stadium was demolished that autumn and the site has since been redeveloped for housing.

== Notable people ==
Politician Albert Stanley was born in New Normanton in 1874. His family emigrated to the United States in 1880, but he later returned to the United Kingdom, becoming a member of parliament, cabinet minister and Chair of London Underground. Research Scientist and Member of Parliament Ashok Kumar was born in India, moving to Normanton as a child, where he lived on Silver Hill Road.

Footballer Tony Hateley grew up in the area, attending Normanton Junior School and playing for local team Normanton Sports before going on to a professional career with Notts County, Aston Villa and others.

== See also ==
- Listed buildings in Normanton, Derby
