= Millennium Centre =

Millennium Centre or Millennium Center can refer to:

- Millennium Centar, a sports arena and business centre in Vršac, Serbia
- Millennium Centre (Chicago), a skyscraper in Chicago, Illinois, United States
- Millennium Center (Sofia), а building in Sofia, Bulgaria
- Millennium City Centre Gurugram metro station, a metro station in Gurgaon, Haryana, India
- The Millennium Centre, a sixth-form college in Derbyshire, England
- Wales Millennium Centre, a performing arts complex located on the Cardiff Bay waterfront, Wales
