= Pear Tree, Derby =

Suburb of Derby, England

Coordinates: 52.899972°N 1.472082°W

Pear Tree
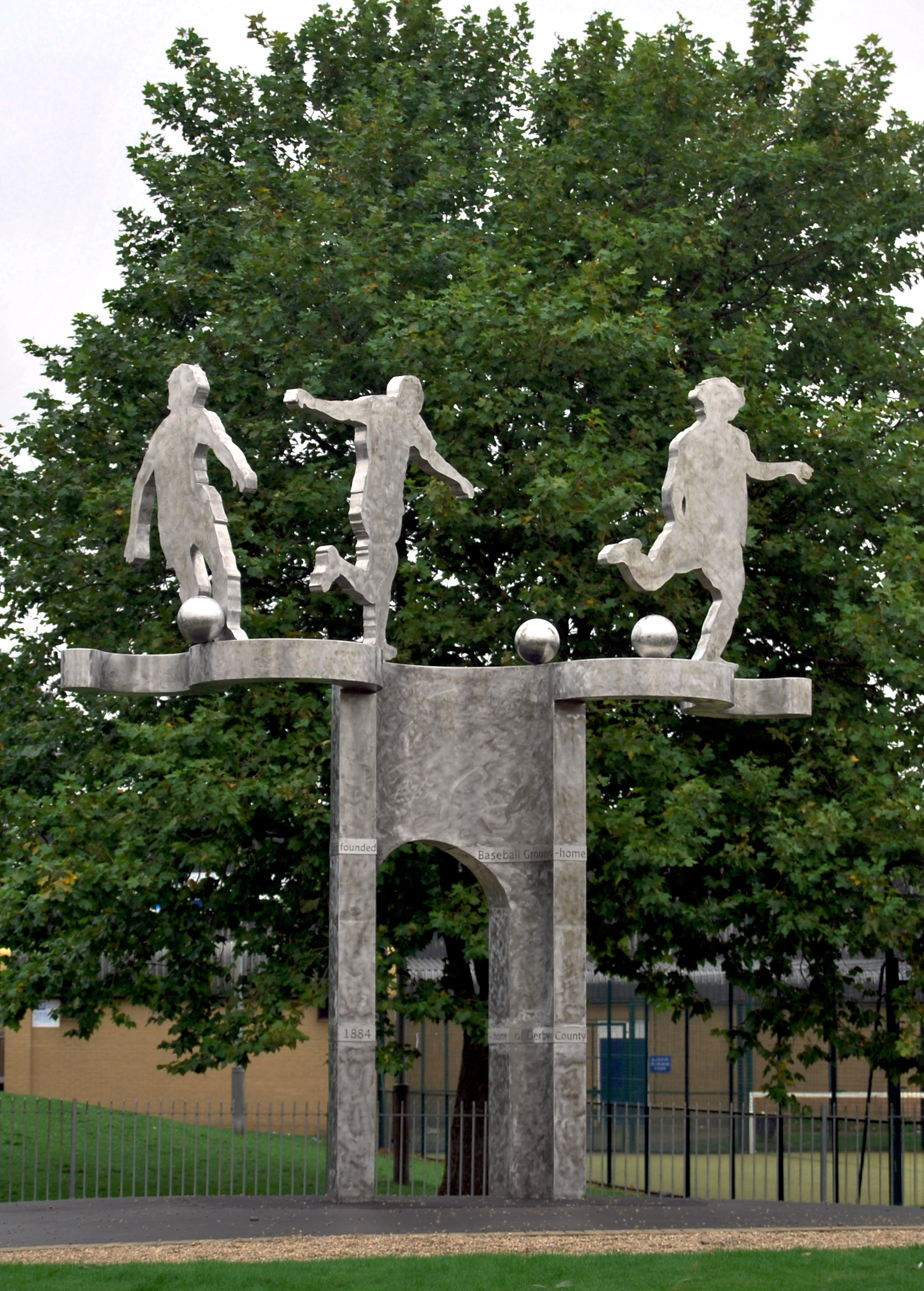
- Sculpture by Denis O'Connor marking the site of the Baseball Ground

- Location within Derbyshire
- Unitary authority: Derby
- Ceremonial county: Derbyshire
- Region: East Midlands
- Country: England
- Sovereign state: United Kingdom
- Post town: DERBY
- Postcode district: DE23
- Dialling code: 01332
- Police: Derbyshire
- Fire: Derbyshire
- Ambulance: East Midlands
- UK Parliament: Derby South

Pear Tree (or Peartree) is an inner city suburb of the city of Derby, in Derbyshire, England, located about 1.2 miles (1.9 km) south of the city centre. It is split between the Arboretum and Normanton electoral wards. Neighbouring areas include Litchurch, Normanton and Osmaston. The area became urbanised in the late 19th century and is characterised by terraced housing originally built for industrial workers.

== History ==
The suburb derives its name from Pear Tree Farm which formerly existed in the area, and was owned by the Peach family from the 18th century. Much of the farmland was sold off for development in the 1860s and 1870s, and the farmhouse demolished. Streets of terraced housing were built up to accommodate workers, industry having been encouraged to develop by the opening of the Birmingham and Derby Junction Railway, which skirts the eastern side of Pear Tree, in 1839. Local businessman Francis Ley opened his Vulcan Iron Works on a site next to the railway line in 1874. It expanded massively in subsequent decades and was a major employer in the area until it was closed and demolished in 1986. Although the demise of Ley's has allowed for some modern redevelopment, much of the original terraced housing typical of the area is of a good quality and has survived.

Like neighbouring Normanton, Pear Tree now has a large multicultural community, with a particularly high number of residents of Asian origin.

== Government ==
Pear Tree has no formally defined boundaries. The area is split between the Arboretum and Normanton wards, two of the seventeen electoral wards which make up Derby. Each ward elects three councillors to Derby City Council. As of the 2015 local elections, all three councillors for both wards represent the Labour Party.

In the 19th century, much of Pear Tree was part of the township and civil parish of Litchurch, which existed independently of Derby between 1860 and 1888 before being integrated into the newly created civil parish and county borough of Derby.

In the Parliament of the United Kingdom, Arboretum and Normanton are two of the wards that make up the constituency of Derby South.

== Geography ==
Pear Tree is an inner city suburb located about 1.2 miles (1.9 km) south of Derby city centre and about 1.1 miles (1.8 km) south-west of the River Derwent. The area is approximately 177 feet (54 m) above sea level.

== Landmarks ==
Until 1997, Pear Tree's most famous landmark was the Baseball Ground, home of Derby's professional football club, Derby County F.C., for most of the twentieth century. However, the stadium was demolished in 2004 having been largely unused since the club's departure to Pride Park some seven years earlier. The site is now being developed to provide private housing and some social with landscaped grounds and a memorial to the site's historic past.

== Famous residents ==
Peace activist Alice Wheeldon lived on Pear Tree Road, where her family home sheltered conscientious objectors avoiding conscription during the First World War. She was convicted of plotting to assassinate Prime Minister David Lloyd George.

Steve Bloomer was a footballer for Derby County, Middlesbrough and England. Born in Cradley, Worcestershire, he moved to Derby as a child, living at a number of addresses in Pear Tree and Normanton and attending the Pear Tree and St James' Road schools. The Bloomer family lived at 35 Portland Street in Pear Tree towards the end of his playing days.

Another footballer was Jack Bowers, who played for Derby County between 1928 and 1936 and during this time appeared three times for England. He lived on Pear Tree Road with his wife (born Edith Mason) where they kept a china shop. Where their home was is now a park. They had two children, John and Susan. The son, John, also played for Derby County.

== Transport ==
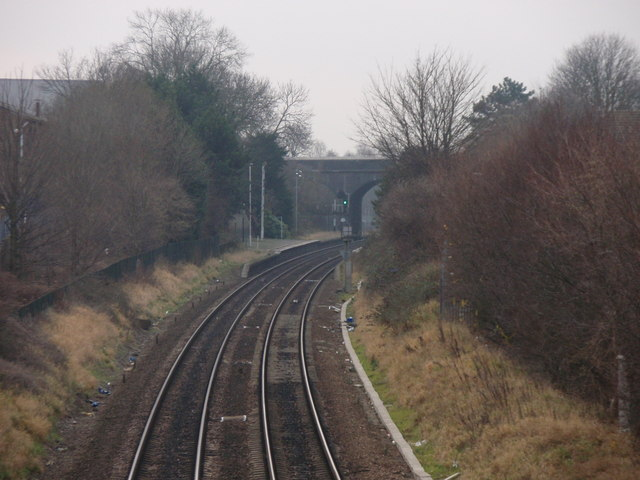
View towards Peartree railway station

The main railway line from Derby to Birmingham, part of the Cross Country Route, forms the eastern boundary of the area. Peartree railway station, located to the south-east of Pear Tree on Osmaston Park Road, is located on the line but is only served by a limited number of stopping trains on the Crewe to Derby route. The station, which originally opened in 1839, is managed by East Midlands Railway. North of Peartree on the line is Ramsline Halt, which was briefly used in the 1990s for Football Specials serving the Baseball Ground but is now disused.

The area surrounding the station is served frequently by bus route 4, operated by Arriva Derby between Derby city centre and Alvaston. The premium (Sapphire-branded) route 38 between Derby and Sinfin also serves Pear Tree.
