= Sunny Hill, Derby =

Coordinates: 52.890°N 1.497°W

Sunny Hill
- Location within Derbyshire
- OS grid reference: SK339326
- Unitary authority: Derby
- Ceremonial county: Derbyshire
- Region: East Midlands
- Country: England
- Sovereign state: United Kingdom
- Post town: DERBY
- Postcode district: DE23
- Dialling code: 01332
- Police: Derbyshire
- Fire: Derbyshire
- Ambulance: East Midlands
- UK Parliament: Derby South

Sunny Hill (or Sunnyhill) is a southern suburb of the city of Derby, England, situated mainly along the Stenson Road (which goes out to the hamlet of Stenson, on the Trent and Mersey Canal). It lies between the Derby City districts of Normanton and Littleover, and, to the south, Sinfin, and the parish of Stenson Fields in South Derbyshire district.

== History ==
Sunny Hill is not identified by name in the Domesday Book, but the land and any dwellings in the area would be included within Normanton in the hundred of Litchurch.

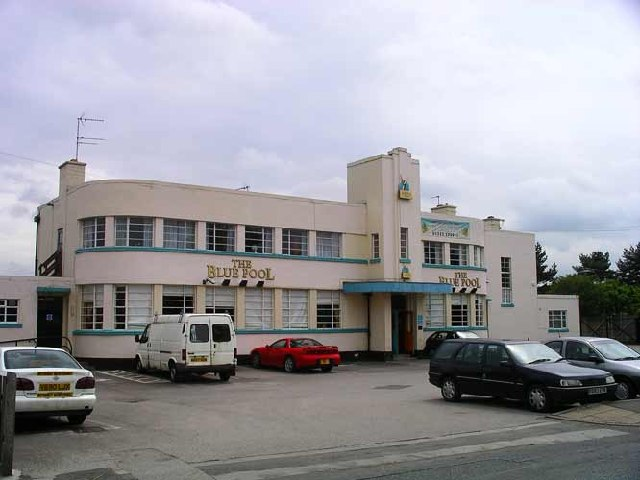
Blue Pool public house (in 2005), now Tesco Express

The Birmingham and Derby Junction Railway line was built in the 1830s, and forms a boundary of Sunny Hill to the south and east. This is now the Derby-Birmingham section of the Cross Country Route.

Sunny Hill is identified as the name of a small hamlet on the Ordnance Survey maps from (at least) 1883 to the mid-1930s, situated along Stenson Road between the junctions with the current Sunnyhill Avenue and Blagreaves Lane. The high point along Stenson Road in this area (grid reference SK33923265) would appear to be the 'hill' referred to by the name.

Prominent on the early maps are Sunny Hill House (shown until the 1960s when the current Bideford Drive was built) and its associated farmhouse (situated near the current Oadby Rise).

During the 1930s, significant development of the area started. The Blue Pool public house was built on Stenson Road in 1936, one of three similar built in Derby in art deco style (the others being the Blue Peter in Alvaston and the Blue Boy in Chaddesden).

In early 1939, 5 acres of land (near the railway line, now Mimosa Crescent) were sold to Clarke Aircraft Products, whose factory made aircraft engine components, including those relating to Henry Clarke's patented oil viscosity control valves.

During the Second World War, a German prisoner of war camp was constructed on the land south of Sunnyhill Avenue. Initially in 1941 this housed almost 400 men, but was enlarged in 1942 to accommodate an additional 200.

After the war, in November 1945, this land was sold to the government War Department, and the camp was used to house eastern European displaced persons as European Voluntary Workers. A row of officers' houses had addresses given as Sunnyhill Camp; the houses remain, now forming part of Staunton Avenue. These continued in military use through the 1950s, with officers based at the nearby Normanton Barracks being billeted there.

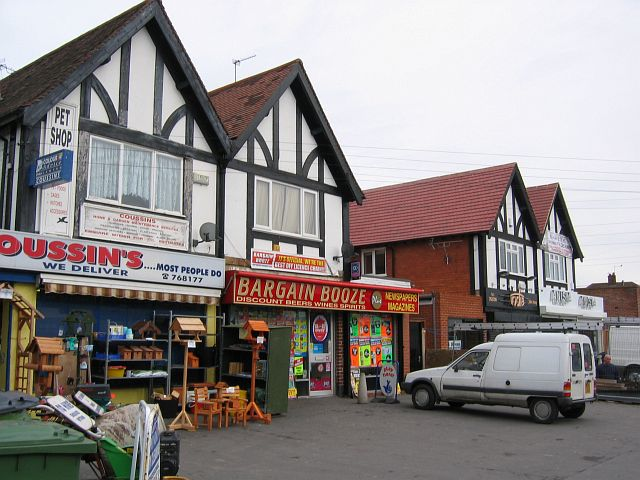
Shops at Sunny Hill - Blagreaves Lane

In 1951, the land used by Clarke Aviation was bought by Qualcast for use as their lawnmower production factory. Qualcast remained on the site until 1991.

The Blue Pool pub closed in 2009, and the building has since been used as a Tesco Express convenience store.

From the mid-1930s until the end of the 20th century, housing has progressively been built on the former farm, military camp and factory sites, giving rise to today's predominantly domestic suburb of Derby.

The community is ethnically diverse, with significant Asian populations.

== Local Facilities ==
A post office was situated on Stenson Road opposite the junction of Sunnyhill Avenue, it was shut down in 2014. Post office services were moved to the Co-op store at the Blagreaves Lane junction.

A local library and a range of shops, take-aways and other services are situated around the Stenson Road end of Blagreaves Lane.

Derby bus services run on Stenson Road, and circular routes between Derby, Sunny Hill and the Royal Derby Hospital.
