= Littleover =

Village in Derbyshire, England

Coordinates: 52.906°N 1.505°W

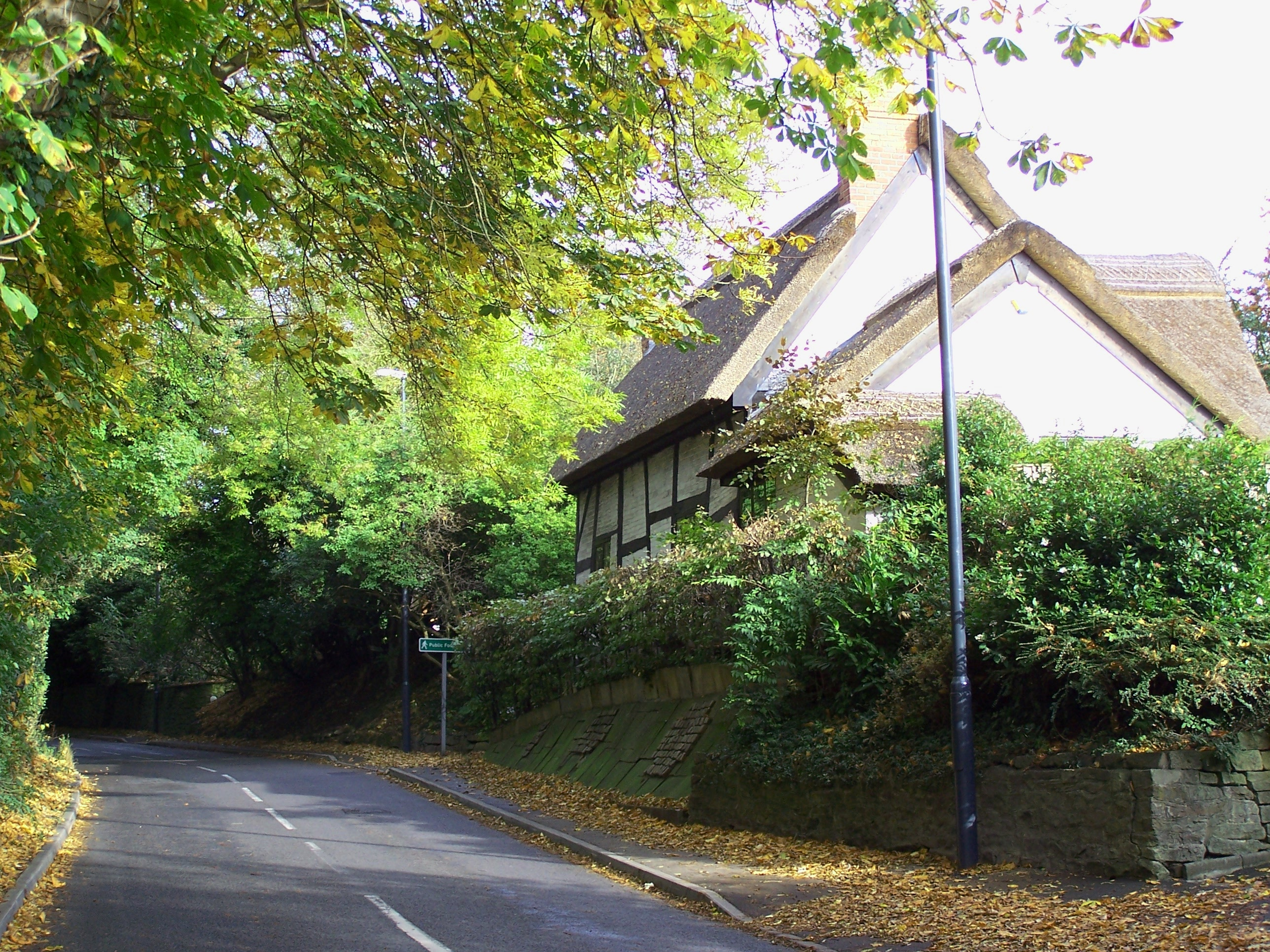
- Hollow and Old Littleover Cottage

- Location within Derbyshire
- Population: 23,958
- OS grid reference: SK3334
- Unitary authority: Derby
- Ceremonial county: Derbyshire
- Region: East Midlands
- Country: England
- Sovereign state: United Kingdom
- Post town: DERBY
- Postcode district: DE23
- Dialling code: 01332
- Police: Derbyshire
- Fire: Derbyshire
- Ambulance: East Midlands
- UK Parliament: Derby North

Littleover is a village and suburb in the city of Derby, in Derbyshire, England, between Rose Hill, Normanton, Sunny Hill and Mickleover, about 3 miles (4.8 km) southwest of Derby city centre.

== History ==
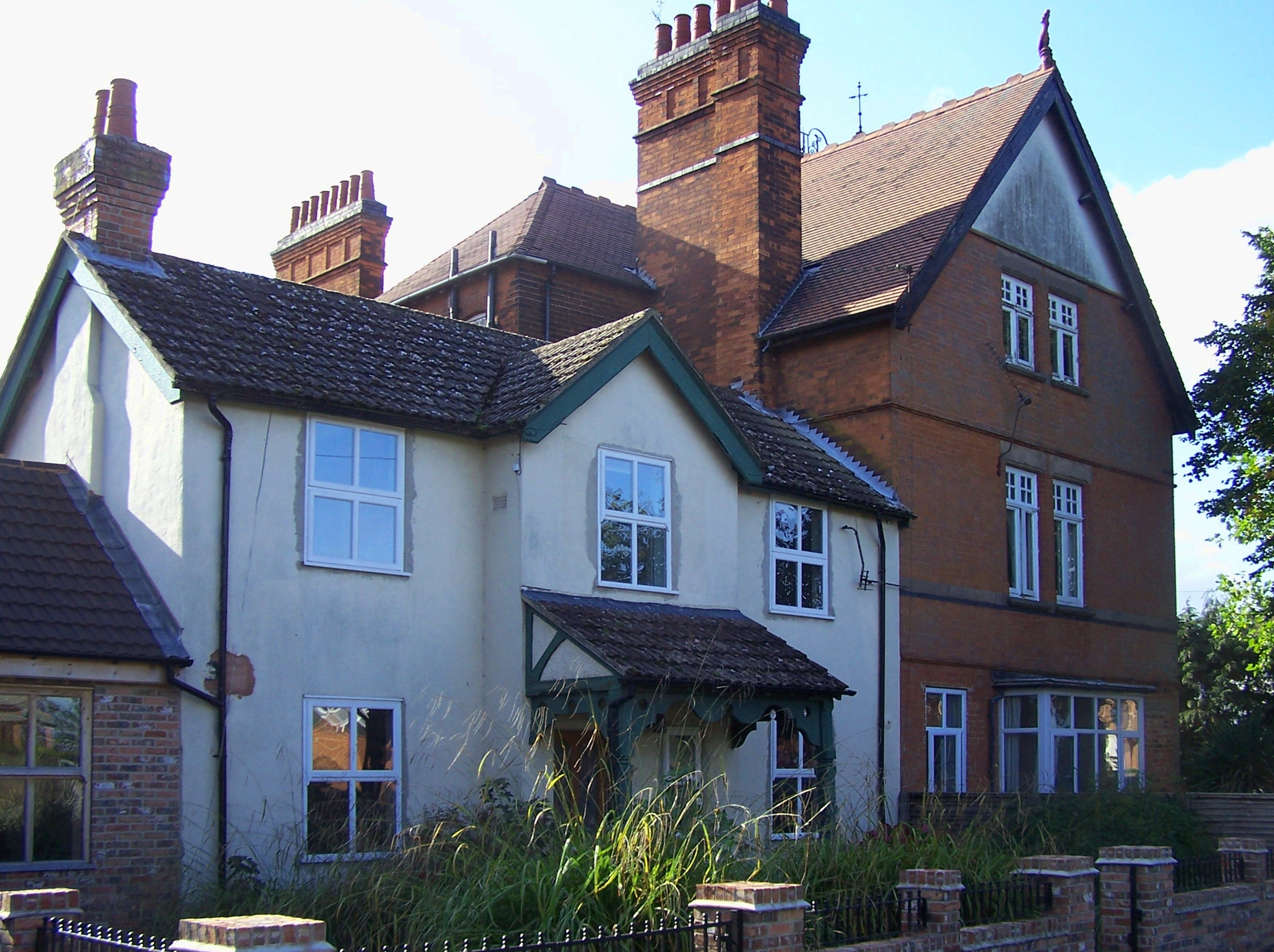
The Towers and Cottage

The history of Littleover's name is simple. It is derived from "Little Ufre" (Domesday book) and in Old English ofer meant a slope or little hill, whilst neighbouring Mickleover is known to be from "Mickle Ufre" meaning large hill. Littleover was also formerly known as Parver Over.

The village, like many settlements in England, is partially of Saxon and partially of Roman origin; the Burton Road is a Roman road linking the A38 to the city centre. Its Roman origin is easily confirmed due to its direct route. Burton Road, the A5250, leaves the A38 as Rykneld Road and becomes Pastures Hill just past Heatherton Village. At the top of Pastures Hill it crosses a junction with Hillsway and Chain Lane, whereupon it becomes Burton Road and remains so up to its junction with Babington Lane in Derby city centre. Despite the attraction of the Burton Road–Babington Lane route, it is possible that the course of the original Rykneld Way did not deviate but continued in a straight line through the rear of what was the Crest Motel.

Littleover was formerly a township and chapelry in the parish of Mickleover, in 1866 Littleover became a separate civil parish, on 1 April 1968 the parish was abolished and merged with Derby and Findern. In 1961 the parish had a population of 11,867. It is now in the unparished area of Derby, in the Derby district.

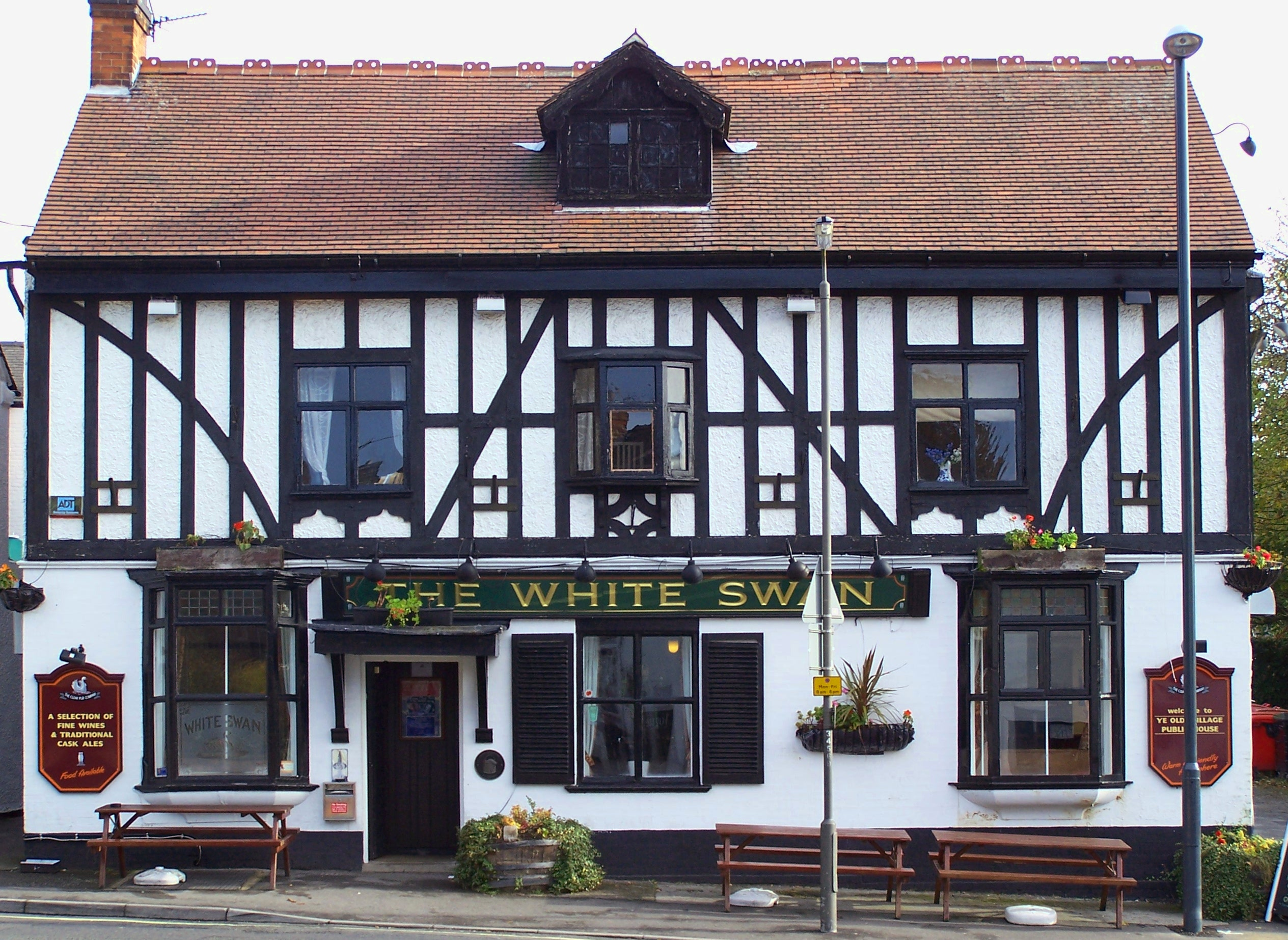
White Swan public house

Littleover's main shopping area is situated around Burton Road as the village is entered from the ring road. The village's main public house is called the Half Moon and is notable as being one of two inns in the village in 1577; it still serves as a community hub where residents gather and socialise. The older part of the village around St Peter's Church was built in the 14th century. The village has another public house, the White Swan which can be found on Shepherd Street also near the older part of Littleover. Directly opposite the White Swan is Church Street which takes its name from the aforementioned St Peter's Church and links up with the Hollow which is believed to be of medieval origin. The age of the Hollow and Church Street are evidenced by the buildings that can be found there; even today the former contains the beautiful thatched roofed Littleover Cottage (very rare in Derbyshire), whilst on Church Street can be found a detached white house, which in its time has been called the White House and would probably have been there before most of the buildings around it. Residential properties in Littleover are generally attractive, well-maintained and spacious properties which are highly desired within the Derby area. The White House, it is believed, may date in part from the 16th century, whereupon it probably would have stood alone with the thatched cottage and church. In earlier times this area was the centre of activity in the village where the square was used for markets, proclamations and general celebrations on public holidays.

The Crest Hotel, built around the late 19th century on a site previously occupied by a windmill, burnt down in 2002. Today a housing development stands where the hotel used to be.

== Education ==
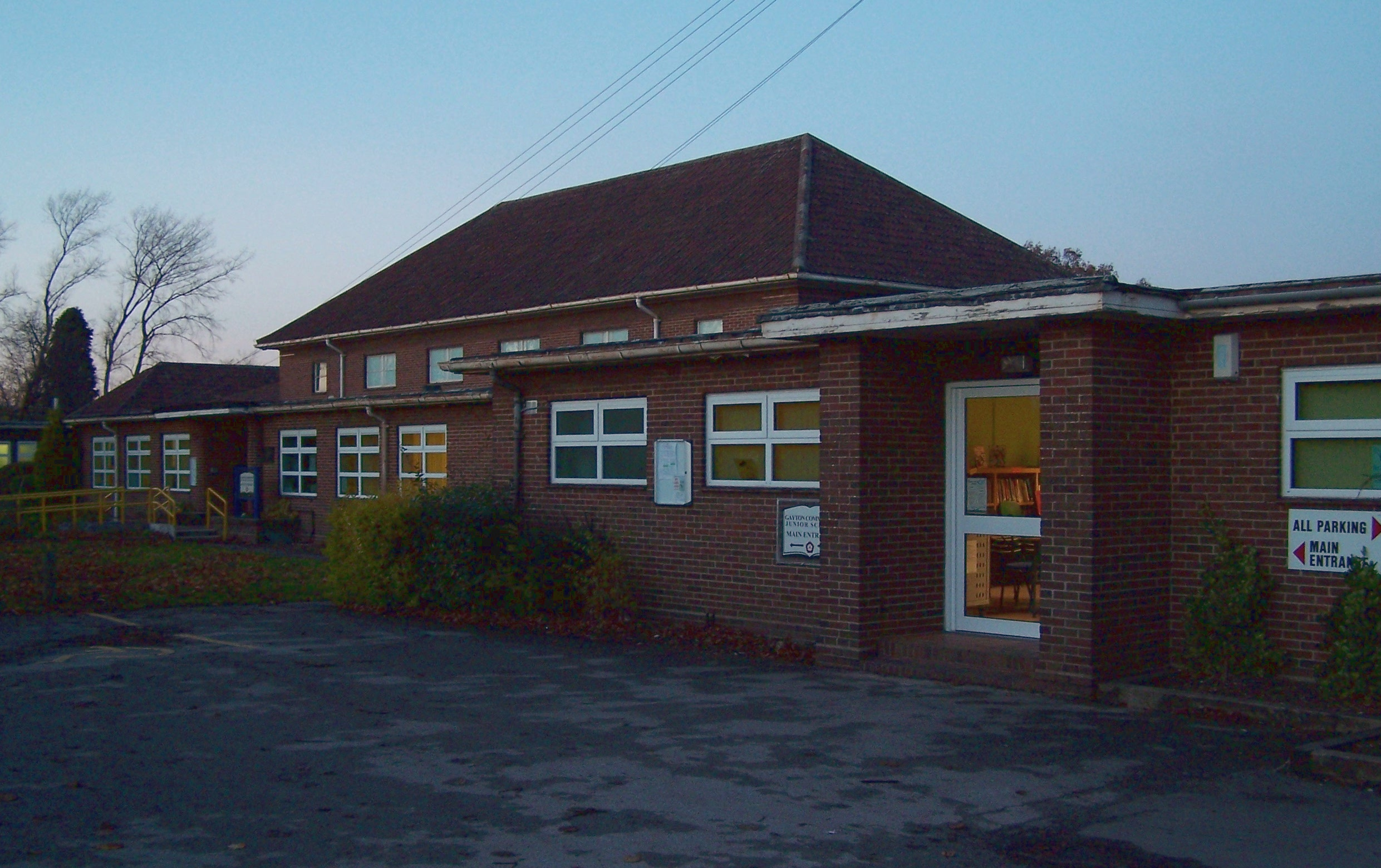
Gayton Avenue School

The final location of Derby School was in Littleover on Moorway Lane, the site is now occupied by Derby Moor Community Sports College.

Infant, junior and primary schools:

- St Georges Catholic Voluntary Academy
- Gayton Junior School
- Ridgeway Infant School
- Carlyle Infant School
- Griffe Field Primary School built as part of the Heatherton Village estate in 1999
- Highfields Spencer Academy
- St Peter's CofE Junior School

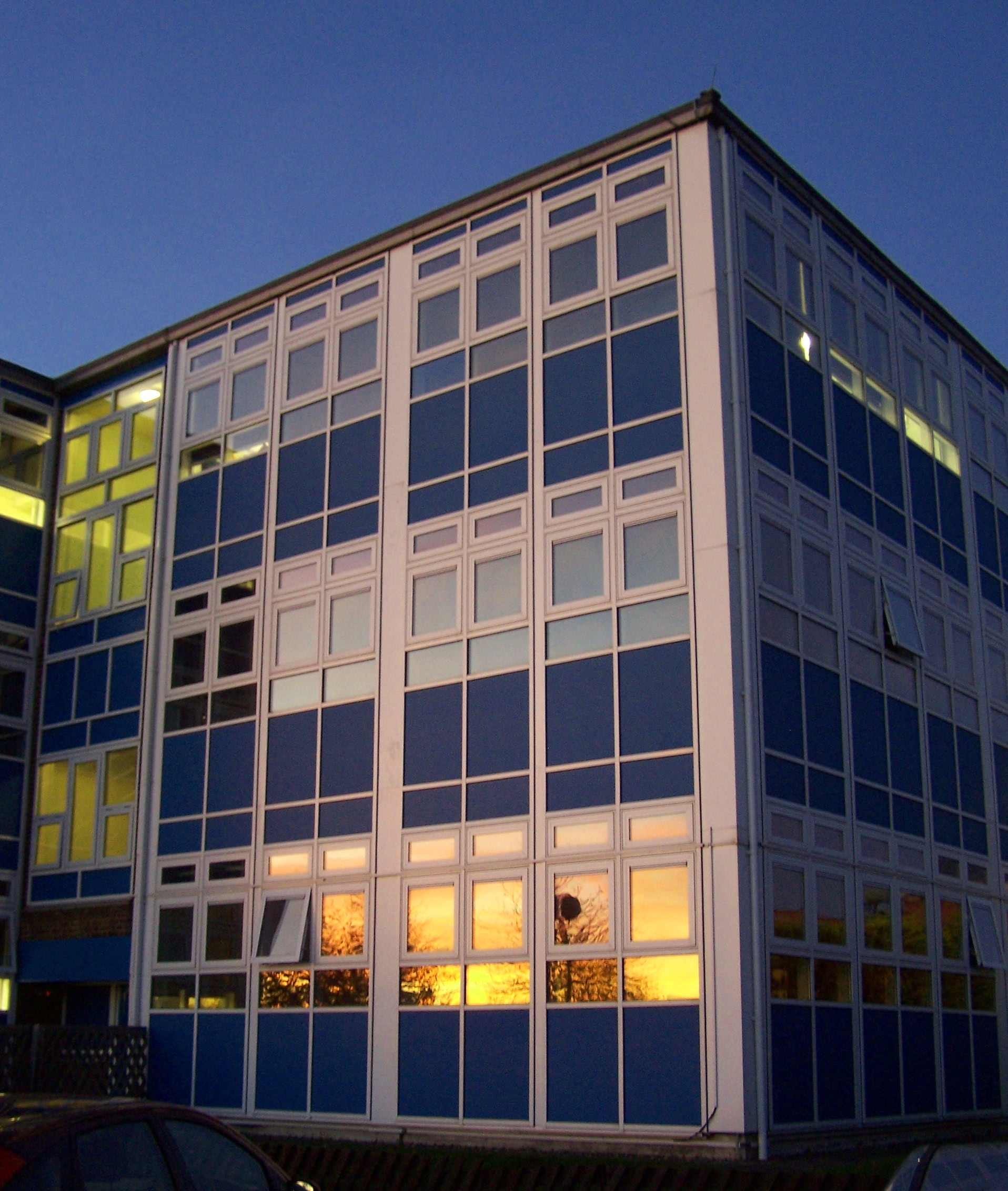
Derby Moor Community Sports College and the Millennium Centre

Secondary and sixth form schools:

- Derby Grammar School (Boys independent school)
- Derby High School (Girls independent school)
- Derby Moor Community Sports College (Comprehensive School)
- Littleover Community School (Comprehensive School)

== Notable residents ==
- Freda Bedi, the first Western woman to take full ordination in Tibetan Buddhism.
- Lee Camp, goalkeeper
- Judith Hann, TV presenter (Tomorrow's World) was born here
- Keiran Lee, pornographic actor
- Fiona May, athlete
- Noky Simbani, model
- Harry Slack FRSE, zoologist
- Michael Socha, actor
- Lucy Ward, musician, grew up in Littleover
- Kelli Young, member of British pop group Liberty X

== See also ==
- Listed buildings in Littleover
