= Heatherton Village =

Housing development in Derby, England

Coordinates: 52.89130°N 1.52021°W

- Location within Derbyshire
- OS grid reference: SK318330
- Unitary authority: Derby
- Ceremonial county: Derbyshire
- Region: East Midlands
- Country: England
- Sovereign state: United Kingdom
- Post town: DERBY
- Postcode district: DE23
- Dialling code: 01332
- Police: Derbyshire
- Fire: Derbyshire
- Ambulance: East Midlands
- UK Parliament: Derby North

Heatherton Village (or Heatherton) is a residential area of Derby, England, located at the southern end of the village of Littleover, and approximately 3 miles (4.8 km) south-west of Derby City Centre. It comprises a range of modern housing, several public parks, shops, churches, a school and a nursery.

== History ==
During its development in the 1990s the area was initially referred to as "Hollybrook". This was after one of two brooks flowing through the area, the other being the Hell Brook. The former goes through the grounds of the Hollybrook pub before flowing into the latter which comes from Mickleover past Littleover Community School.

The area is situated off the A5250, three miles south-west of the Derby city centre, with easy access to Burton and Birmingham via the A38 and to the M1 via the A50.

The majority of the Heatherton development is highly sought-after property, and has been popular among professional footballers. During the first stint of Derby County F.C. in the Premiership between 1996 and 2002, Heatherton was home to Fabrizio Ravanelli. Other players who have lived there include Christian Dailly, Giles Barnes and Mart Poom.

== Education ==
Griffe Field Primary School lies within the estate on Grosvenor Drive, built as a part of the initial development by Birch plc (since acquired by Edinburgh-based Miller Homes) but since expanded to double its original size early in the 2000s.

== Community facilities ==
There is a small shopping arcade on Hollybrook Way, at the south-western entrance to the estate, across the road from the Haven Church, the Hollybrook pub and a doctor's surgery. An Aldi supermarket was opened on a greenfield site adjacent to the Hollybrook pub in 2022.

Since the late 1990s, Heatherton has been served by a bus route operated by Trent Barton, known as "The Harlequin". It circles the estate and runs to a terminus on Gower Street in Derby's city centre during daytime from Monday to Saturday.

A bus route operated by Notts + Derby named "Link1" was established in 2024, connecting Heatherton and neighbouring Highfields Estate and Mickleover to Royal Derby Hospital via hourly buses. This bus was cancelled in the summer of 2025, reportedly due to too few passengers.
