= Millennium Hall =

Millennium Hall may refer to:

- Millenium Hall, or A Description of Millenium Hall and the Country Adjacent, a 1762 novel by Sarah Scott
- Millennium Hall, one of several buildings funded by the Millennium Commission to celebrate the turn of the millennium
- Millennium Hall (Addis Ababa), a multi-purpose venue in Addis Ababa, Ethiopia

== See also ==
- Millennium Centre (disambiguation)
