= Arboretum (ward) =

Electoral ward in Derby, England

Coordinates: 52.911°N 1.473°W

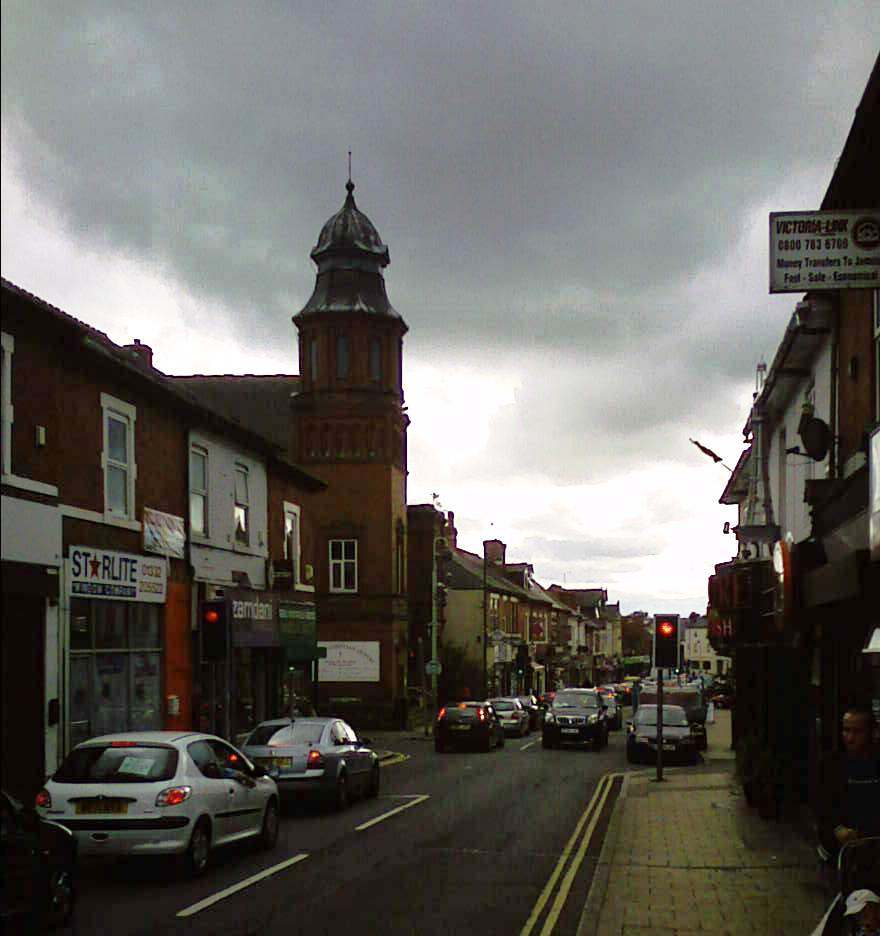
- Normanton Road

- Location within Derbyshire
- Area: 1.32 sq mi (3.4 km^{2})
- Population: 18,590 (2011 Census)
  - Density: 14,083/sq mi (5,437/km^{2})
- OS grid reference: SK357352
  - London: 112.5 mi (181.1 km) SSE
- Unitary authority: Derby
- Ceremonial county: Derbyshire
- Region: East Midlands
- Country: England
- Sovereign state: United Kingdom
- Post town: DERBY
- Postcode district: DE1, DE23
- Dialling code: 01332
- Police: Derbyshire
- Fire: Derbyshire
- Ambulance: East Midlands
- UK Parliament: Derby South

Arboretum is an electoral ward in the city of Derby, England. It includes Derby city centre and the inner city suburbs of Pear Tree and Rose Hill, as well as part of Normanton. It covers much of the area of the historic township of Litchurch. The ward, which takes its name from Derby Arboretum in Rose Hill, had a population of 18,590 in 2011.

== Government ==
Arboretum is one of the seventeen electoral wards which make up Derby, and as such elects three councillors to Derby City Council. As of the 2015 local elections, all three councillors for the area represent the Labour Party. It is one of seven Derby wards that form the Derby South constituency in the House of Commons of the United Kingdom Parliament.

== Geography ==
=== Areas of Arboretum ===
==== City centre ====
The city centre is Derby's central business district and main shopping area. It is the location of the Council House, headquarters of Derby City Council. Other notable buildings include Derby Cathedral, the Museum and Art Gallery, the Silk Mill and the Quad arts centre. Retail and leisure areas include the Derbion shopping centre, the St. Peter's Quarter and the Cathedral Quarter. Ye Olde Dolphin Inne is reputedly Derby's oldest public house. Parks and open spaces adjacent to the River Derwent include Cathedral Green, the River Gardens and Bass' Recreation Ground. Derby bus station is located in the city centre, with the main railway station situated to the south-east.

==== Rose Hill ====
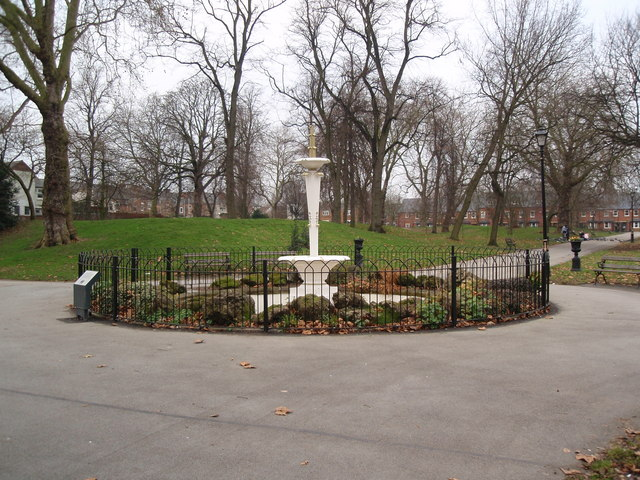
The fountain in Derby Arboretum

Rose Hill is an inner city suburb centred on Rose Hill Street, between Normanton Road and Dairy House Road. It is located about 0.8 miles (1.3 km) south of the city centre. The area became urbanised in the late 19th century and is characterised by high density terraced housing. Derby's historic Arboretum, which gives its name to the ward, is located in Rose Hill.

==== Pear Tree ====
Pear Tree is another inner city suburb, located about 1.2 miles (1.9 km) south of the city centre. it is immediately south of Rose Hill and has a similar Victorian character. Ley's Vulcan Iron Works (opened 1874) was formerly a major local industrial presence, but closed in 1986. Derby County F.C. played at the Baseball Ground in Pear Tree between 1895 and 1997. Part of the Pear Tree area falls within the neighbouring Normanton ward.

==== New Normanton ====
Although most of Normanton is within the ward of the same name, a small part of New Normanton, to the west of Normanton Road, lies within Arboretum ward.

== Demography ==
According to the 2011 Census, the Arboretum ward had a population of 18,590 in 7,384 households. This was a 34.72% increase on the 2001 Census figure of 13,799.

The area has a high ethnic minority population, particularly of an Asian background. In 2011, 67% of the population was estimated to be non-White British, compared to a figure of 25% for the whole of Derby. Around 41% of the ward population is British Asian, with the largest minority community being British Pakistanis at 31% of the total population.

== See also ==
- Listed buildings in Derby (Arboretum Ward)
