= Litchurch =

Area of Derby, England

Coordinates: 52.914°N 1.471°W

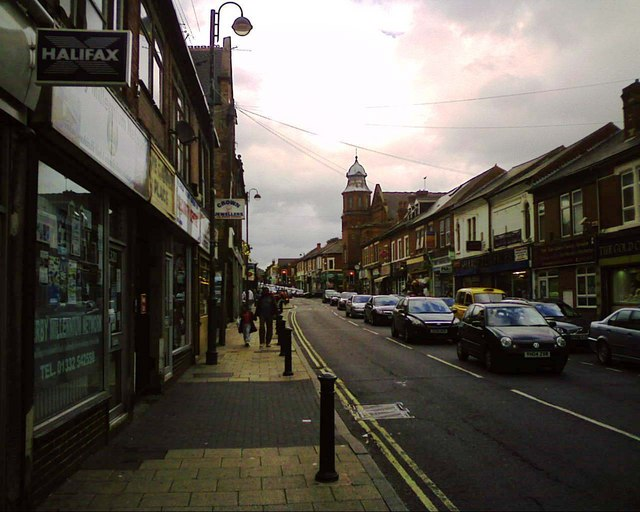
- Normanton Road in Litchurch

- Location within Derbyshire
- Unitary authority: Derby
- Ceremonial county: Derbyshire
- Region: East Midlands
- Country: England
- Sovereign state: United Kingdom
- Post town: DERBY
- Postcode district: DE
- Dialling code: 01332
- Police: Derbyshire
- Fire: Derbyshire
- Ambulance: East Midlands
- UK Parliament: Mid Derbyshire

Litchurch is a historical area in the city of Derby, in Derbyshire, England. From Medieval times it was a rural township associated with Derby but outside the burgh boundary, before experiencing rapid urbanisation and population growth in the 19th century. After a brief existence as a self-governing local board area between 1866 and 1889, it was absorbed by the newly created Derby county borough and has subsequently fallen into obscurity.

== History ==
The name Litchurch is of Anglo-Saxon origin, meaning Luda's Church. This church has not been identified with certainty, but it may refer to an early settlement around nearby St Peter's Church, Derby. The earliest reference to Litchurch is in the Domesday Book when it was also one the hundreds of Derbyshire, meaning that at one time it was the meeting place for the hundred court. By 1300, it had been combined with the neighbouring hundred of Morleston.

Around the time that Derby was granted a new town charter in 1203, St Peter's Church was transferred to the control of the Abbey of Darley, while the manor of Litchurch was joined to the holdings of Peter de Sandiacre. As a consequence of this reorganisation, Litchurch now lay outside the borough boundary and was classed as a separate township within Derby-St Peter.

Over the next five hundred years Litchurch remained a rural backwater on the fringes of Derby, and by 1700 was described as a "liberty of itself but no house, only three or four cottages". In 1757 Thomas Borrow, Derby's Town Clerk, married Anne Ault of Loughborough and came into the use of £4,000 and lands and property in Litchurch.

By the beginning of the 19th century, Litchurch's population was still only 35. The coming of the railway industry to Derby from 1839 onwards, however, was the catalyst for a huge expansion of the local population, including areas outside the historic borough boundaries. Over the next few decades, an ever-increasing number of Derby's amenities came to be located in Litchurch: much of the Midland Railway's properties, including the railway station and the Derby Carriage and Wagon Works, as well as Derby Arboretum and parts of the Derby Canal. The Osmaston Road area contained the Derby workhouse, but was also home to many prominent middle class residents living in large houses such as The Field, at one time occupied by Midland Railway engineer William Henry Barlow.

In 1866 Litchurch became a separate civil parish, on 26 March 1898 the parish was abolished and merged with Derby and became part of the county borough of Derby. In 1891 the parish had a population of 23,003. It is now in the unparished area of Derby, in the Derby district.

Since being abolished it has had no officially defined administrative function. Indeed the use of the name itself has fallen into decline in recent decades, many of the residential streets at the heart of 19th century Litchurch having been obliterated in the 1970s to facilitate the expansion of the neighbouring Derbyshire Royal Infirmary.

An early map of Derby dated 1819 shows The Liberty Of Litchurch. A street name-plate located on Normanton Road, next to Grove Street, identifies the area as "Normanton Road- Litchurch". The area also had a gallows located in what is now Derby Arboretum. Litchurch lent its name to the Midland Railway's Derby Litchurch Lane Works.
