= Listed buildings in Normanton, Derby =

Normanton is an electoral ward in the city of Derby, England. The ward contains five listed buildings that are recorded in the National Heritage List for England. All the listed buildings are designated at Grade II, the lowest of the three grades, which is applied to "buildings of national importance and special interest". The ward contains Normanton, originally a village, later a suburb to the south of the centre of the city. The listed buildings consist of houses, cottages and a war memorial.

== Buildings ==
Name and location	Photograph	Date	Notes
185 and 187 Village Street; 52.89863°N 1.48588°W	—	18th century	A pair of roughcast houses with dog-tooth eaves, a tile roof and two storeys. Steps lead up to a doorway on the front, and there is another doorway on the right gable end. The windows vary, and some have segmental heads.
189 Village Street; 52.89863°N 1.48621°W	—	18th century	A detached house in painted brick with a tile roof. There are two storeys and two bays. On the front is a gabled porch and casement windows, those in the ground floor with cambered heads.
100 St Chad's Road; 52.90990°N 1.48733°W	—	Early 19th century	A house in red brick with plain eaves and a slate roof. There are three storeys and three bays. In the centre is a cornice hood on slender columns, with a frieze and paterae, and steps leading up to a doorway with a rectangular fanlight. Most of the windows are sashes, those in the lower two floors with channelled wedge lintels.
177–183 Village Street; 52.89859°N 1.48566°W	—	Early 19th century	A pair of cottages in painted brick with a slate roof, hipped on the left. There are two storeys and five bays. On the front are two doorways and small-pane casement windows.
War memorial 52.89877°N 1.48658°W		1922	The war memorial is in the churchyard of St Giles' Church. It is in sandstone and consists of a Celtic cross with a tapered rectangular shaft on a low socket, that has miniature gables, angle buttresses, and a carved shield. The shaft has a chamfered base stone standing on a stepped plinth. On the base stone is an inscription, and on the upper step of the plinth are the names of those lost in the First World War.
