= St Giles' Church, Normanton, Derby =

St Giles’ Church, Derby
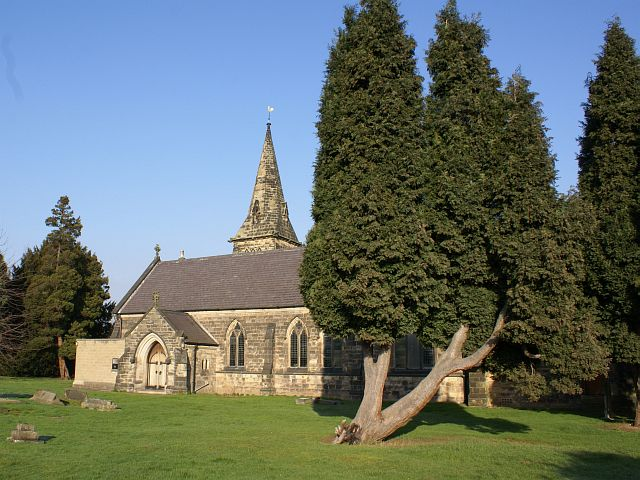
- St Giles’ Church, Normanton, Derby (Photo by Nikki Mahadevan)
- St Giles’ Church, Derby
- 52°53′53.49″N 1°29′10.88″W
- Location: Normanton, Derby
- Country: England
- Denomination: Church of England
- Churchmanship: Conservative Evangelical

History
- Status: Active
- Dedication: St Giles
- Consecrated: 23 September 1863

Architecture
- Functional status: Parish church
- Heritage designation: Locally listed
- Architect(s): Giles and Brookhouse
- Groundbreaking: 1861
- Completed: 13 May 1862

Administration
- Diocese: Diocese of Derby
- Archdeaconry: Archdeaconry of Derby
- Deanery: Derby City
- Parish: Normanton

Clergy
- Vicar: The Revd Neil Barber

St Giles’ Church, Normantion, Derby is a locally listed parish church in the Church of England in Normanton, Derby.

== History ==
The present building replaced a medieval chapel. The church dates from 1861 and was built to the designs of the architects Giles and Brookhouse by the contractors William Bridgart (son of George and Mary Bridgart) and Charles Whiting Bridgart (son of Robert Bridgart snr. and Hannah Bridgart) of Derby. William and Charles were first cousins. It opened for worship on 13 May 1862. It was consecrated on 23 September 1863.

It was enlarged in 1902. Work started on 15 November 1902 when a foundation stone was laid by Fitzherbert Wright, the High Sheriff of Derbyshire. It was substantially reordered and underfloor heating installed in 2010. In 2016 the small 1950s toilet block attached to the South Porch was demolished and replaced with a new Annexe comprising a kitchen, reception area, meeting room (used for creche) and five separate toilets (one of which is for disabled).

=== Present day ===
St Giles' Church is within the Conservative Evangelical tradition of the Church of England, and it has passed resolutions to reject the ordination of women.

== Organ ==
The church contains an organ by Peter Conacher. A specification of the organ can be found on the National Pipe Organ Register.

=== Organists ===
- Fred Morley 1943 - ???? (formerly organist of St Andrew's Church, Derby)
