= St Andrew's Church, Derby =

St Andrew’s Church, Derby
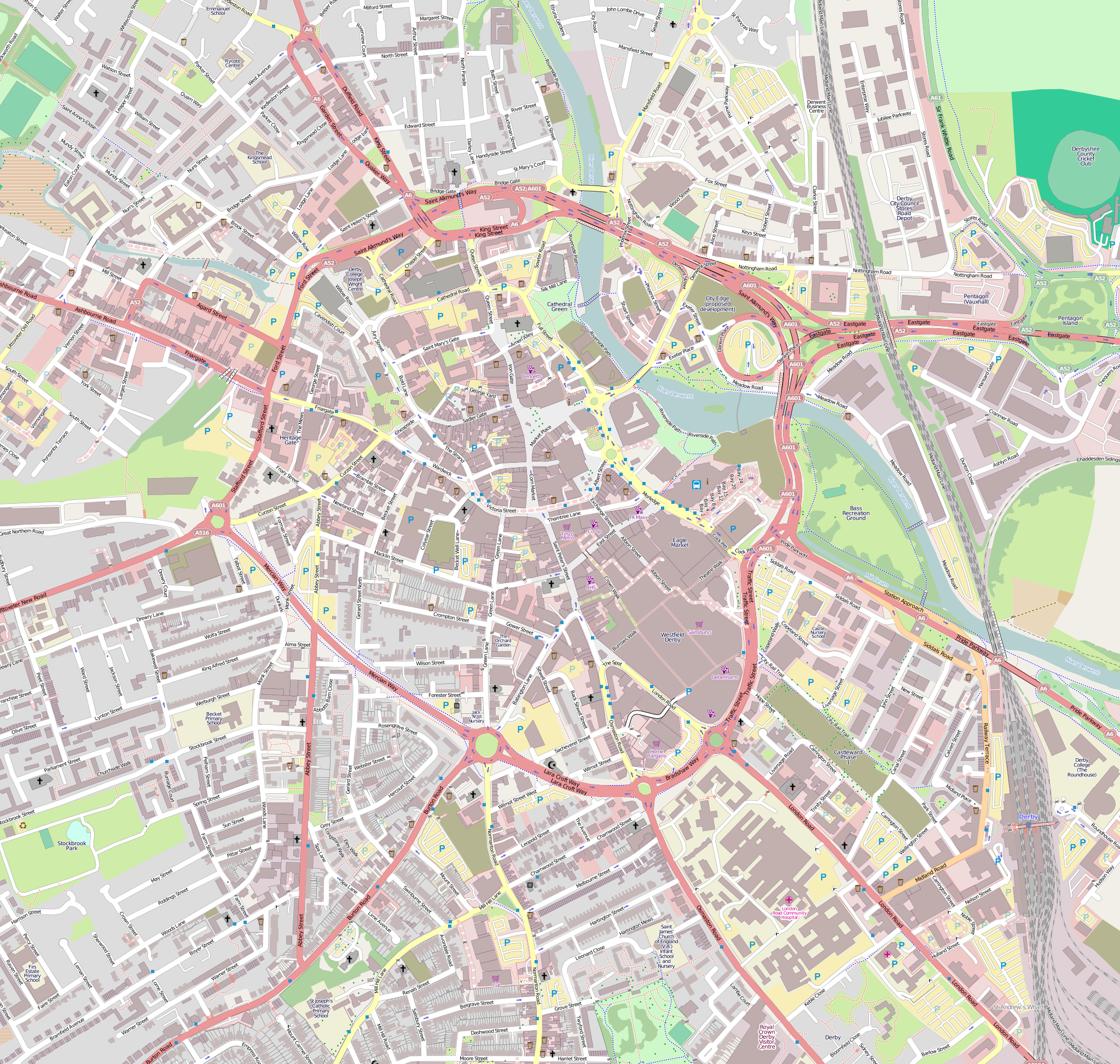
- Location within Derby
- 52°54′50″N 1°27′55.2″W
- Location: Derby, Derbyshire
- Country: England
- Denomination: Church of England

History
- Dedication: St Andrew
- Consecrated: 10 May 1866

Architecture
- Architect: George Gilbert Scott
- Groundbreaking: 29 March 1864
- Demolished: 1970

St Andrew's Church, London Road was a parish church in the Church of England in Derby, Derbyshire. It was built between 1864 and 1867 and demolished in 1971.

== History ==
The corner stone for the church was laid by William Cavendish, 7th Duke of Devonshire on 29 March 1864. The architect was George Gilbert Scott and the contractors were Thompson and Fryer and even though incomplete, it was consecrated on 10 May 1866 by Rt. Revd. John Lonsdale the Bishop of Lichfield.

The font was designed by Scott and carved by Mr. Hall of Derby. It consisted of an octagonal bowl of grey Derbyshire fossil marble, with a clustered column of green Connemara and Red Belgian marble.

Work on the tower and spire started in 1880 and it was consecrated by the Bishop of Lichfield on 30 December 1881.

The musician Ronald Binge, composer of BBC Radio Four's theme tune 'Sailing By', was a boy chorister at the church in the 1920s.

The church became redundant in the 1960s and was demolished in 1971. The parish merged with that of St Osmund's Church, Derby.

== Organ ==
An organ was installed in 1866 for the opening of the church. A new organ was installed in 1902 by Forster and Andrews. It was modified in 1919 by Nicholson and Lord and again in 1928 by J.H. Adkins of Derby. A specification of the organ can be found on the National Pipe Organ Register.

=== Organists ===
- Frederick Bentley 1875 - 1881 (formerly organist of St Thomas' Church, Kendal)
- Edwin Charles Owston 1881 - 1884 (formerly assistant organist at Lincoln Cathedral)
- Walter Maxted 1884 - 1886 (formerly deputy organist of Canterbury Cathedral)
- Dr. Corbett 1886
- Edwin C. Owston 1886 - 1888 (re-appointed)
- R.S. Round 1888 - 1890
- W.L. Dodd 1890 - 1909 (formerly organist of St Peter's Church, Derby)
- W.J. Baker 1909 - 1926
- E. A. Miller 1926 - 1928
- F. Isherwood Plummer 1928 - 1933
- Fred Morley 1933 - 1943 (formerly organist of All Saints' Church, Ripley, Derbyshire and afterwards organist of St Giles' Church, Normanton, Derby)
- S.C. Garland ca. 1948

== Bells ==
Eight bells were installed in the tower in 1881. Bells One to Five, Seven and the Tenor of 20 cwt, 2 qrs, 14 lbs were cast by the Mears and Stainbank foundry in Whitechapel, London in 1881. The Sixth bell had been cast for the church in 1866.
