= Harry Slack =

British zoologist

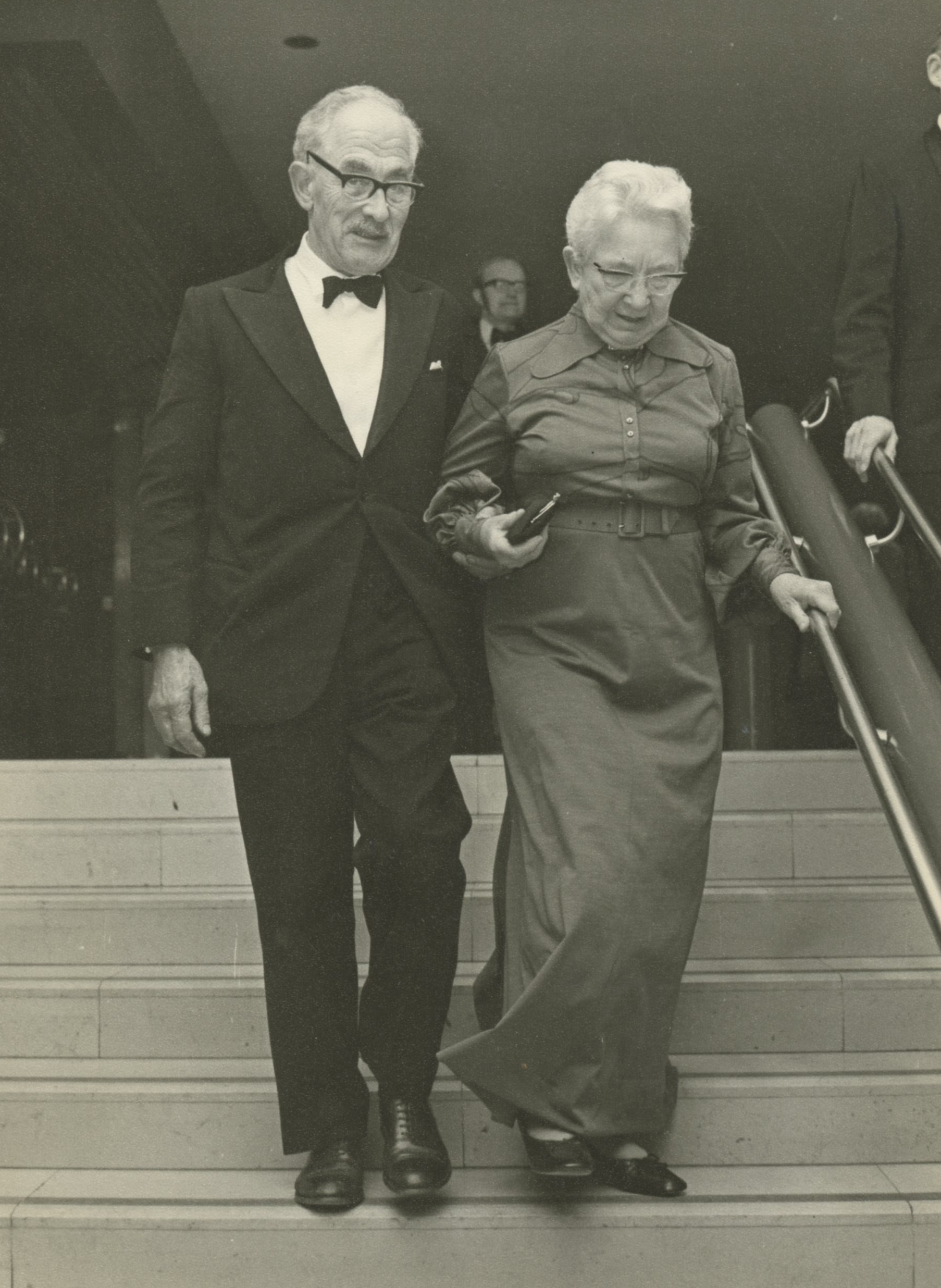
Harry and Flora Slack leaving a black-tie event in Glasgow

Harry Dawson Slack FRSE (29 September 1907–17 October 1982) was a British zoologist closely associated with Loch Lomond in Scotland.

== Life ==
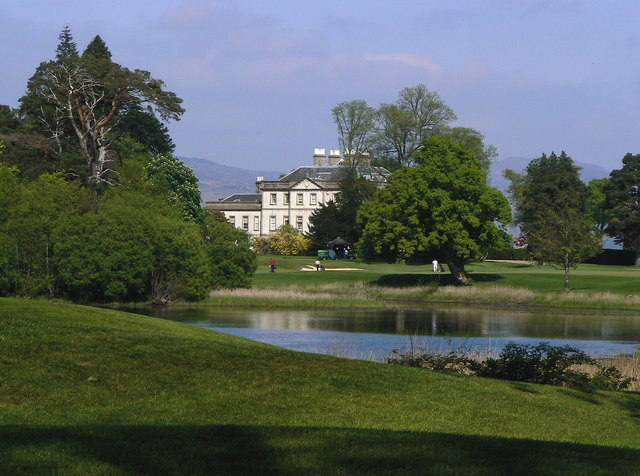
Rossdhu House

He was born in Littleover near Derby on 29 September 1907, the son of Wilfred Heald Slack (born 1873). His father served as an officer in the Derbyshire Volunteers during the First World War, resigning his commission in July 1917.

Slack was educated at Derby Secondary School 1918 to 1920 then Burton-on-Trent Grammar School 1920 to 1927. He then studied zoology at the University of London, graduating with a BSc in 1932. He then attended the University of Edinburgh for postgraduate studies gaining a doctorate (PhD) in 1937. Immediately on qualifying he obtained a post as assistant lecturer in zoology at the University of Glasgow. He has a keen interest in Loch Lomond and in 1938 launched a limnology course at the university involving bathymetric survey of the loch.

In the Second World War he served as a radar officer in the Royal Electrical and Mechanical Engineers, reaching the rank of captain. On demobbing he set up a research station on Loch Lomond at Rossdhu House. This was partially equipped with instruments from the Challenger expedition. During his period here he worked closely with Prof Peter Maitland.

In 1952 he was elected a Fellow of the Royal Society of Edinburgh. His proposers were Maurice Yonge, Otto Lowenstein, Ebenezer Ford, Sheina Marshall and Andrew Picken Orr. At this time his address was then 6 Wardlaw Road in Bearsden.

In 1967 his research transferred from Rossdhu to Queen Elizabeth Forest Park.

He retired to a cottage at Yett of Ptarmigan, Rowardennan in Stirlingshire in 1972 and died there on 17 October 1982.

== Family ==
He married the zoologist Flora Eleanor Cochrane.

== Publications ==
- Chromosomes of Cimex (1939)
- Studies on Loch Lomond (1957)
