= The Millennium Centre =

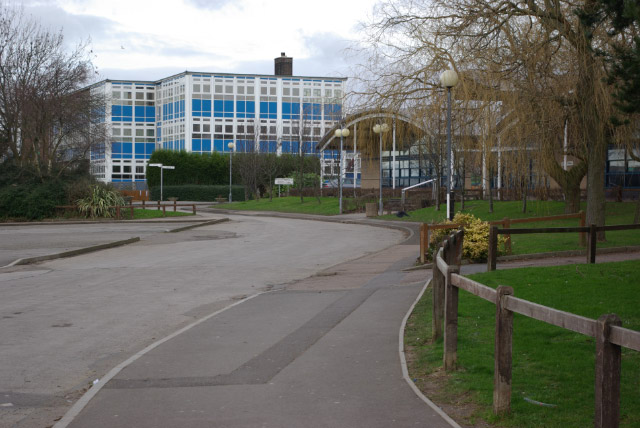

Location
- Derbyshire; England
- Coordinates: 52°53′59″N 1°31′32″W

Information
- Type: Comprehensive community school
- Motto: A centre small enough for every student to be an individual who is known and who matters.
- Established: 1999
- Closed: 2013
- Head: Jane Holden

The Millennium Centre was located in Littleover, Derby. It was a post-16 sixth form centre, run jointly by Derby Moor Community Sports College Trust and Littleover Community School for students who wished to further their education by completing A Levels. The majority of students come from the two schools. The sixth form had joint heads who were initially; Jamie Henshaw for Derby Moor and Rob Archer for Littleover. The Millennium Centre was split between the two schools, after a decade of cooperation.
