= Derby Pride Academy =

Coordinates: 52.8950°N 1.5137°W

Location
- Moorway Lane; Derby, Derbyshire, DE23 2FS; England

Information
- Type: Free School, secondary
- Established: 2012
- Department for Education URN: 138277 Tables
- Ofsted: Reports
- Headteacher: Neil Jamieson
- Gender: Coeducational
- Age: 11 to 16
- Enrolment: 5
- Website: http://www.derbyprideacademy.org.uk/

Derby Pride Academy is an alternative provision secondary free school that opened in September 2012. The school is a joint venture between Derby Moor Academy and Derby County Football Club as part of the Derby Pride Trust.
