= Millennium Centre (Chicago) =

Skyscraper in Chicago, Illinois

Coordinates: 41°53′34″N 87°37′45″W

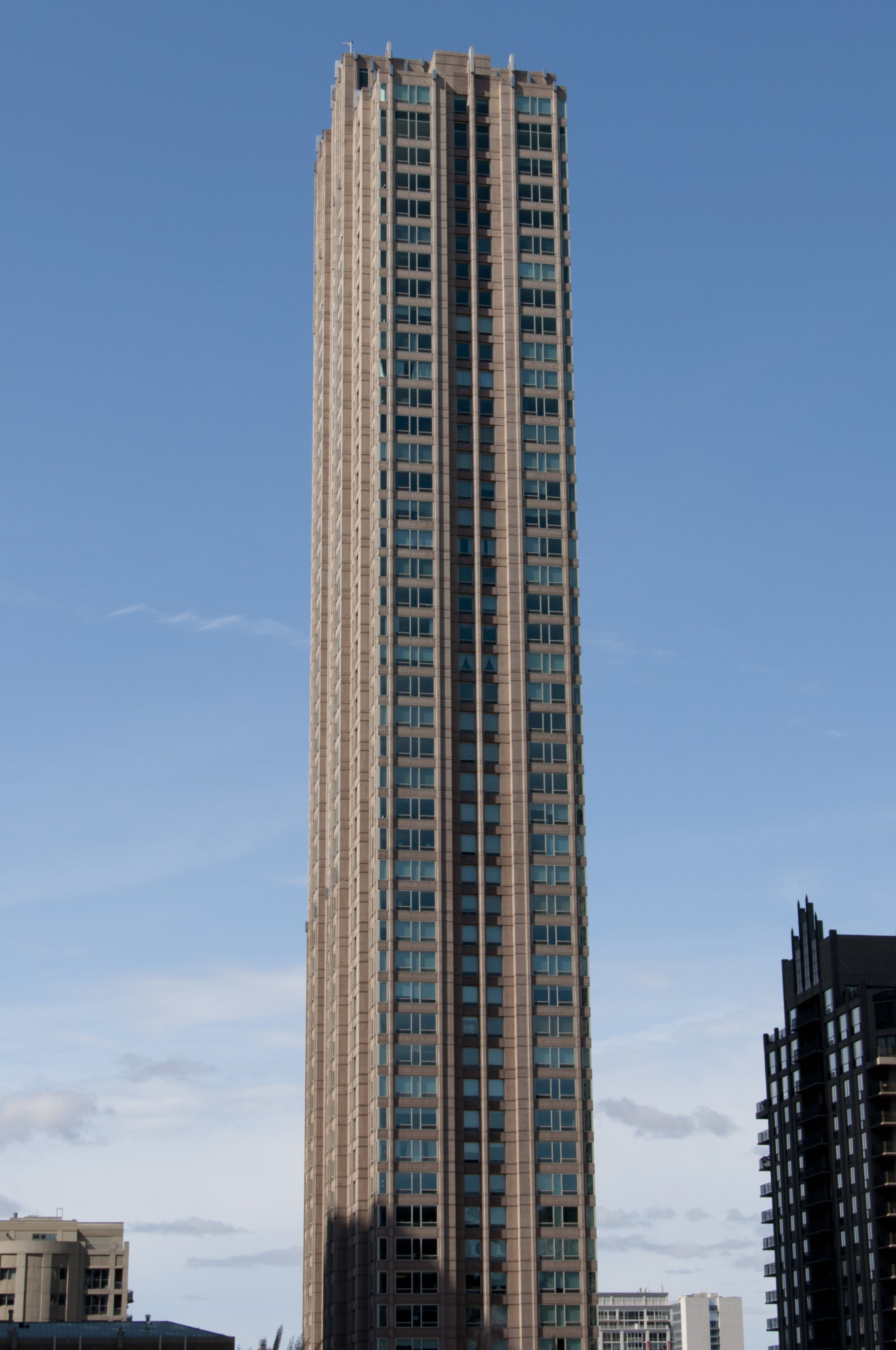
- Interactive map of the Millennium Centre area

General information
- Status: Completed
- Type: Residential
- Location: 33 West Ontario Street, Chicago, Illinois, United States
- Construction started: 2001
- Completed: 2003
- Opening: August 2003

Height
- Roof: 610 ft (190 m)

Technical details
- Floor count: 59

Design and construction
- Architects: Solomon Cordwell Buenz & Associates
- Developer: American Invsco contractor = morse diesl

Millennium Centre is a postmodern skyscraper in Chicago, Illinois in the city's Near North Side neighborhood. The building rises 610 feet (186 m). It contains 59 floors, and was completed in 2003. The architectural firm who designed the building was Solomon Cordwell Buenz & Associates. Millennium Centre notably sold over 95% of its 350 residential units in September 2000, only two days after the developer had released information about the proposed structure; this occurred before the building had even been approved for construction by the City of Chicago. The building's design incorporates a high-rise park on the roof of the 14th floor, with six two-story townhomes circling the park. Millennium Centre is topped off by a 10-foot (3 m) illuminated spire, which is included in the building's structural height.

== See also ==
- List of tallest buildings in Chicago
- Architecture of Chicago
