= Stenson Fields =

Civil parish in Derbyshire, England

Coordinates: 52.875049°N 1.5010393°W

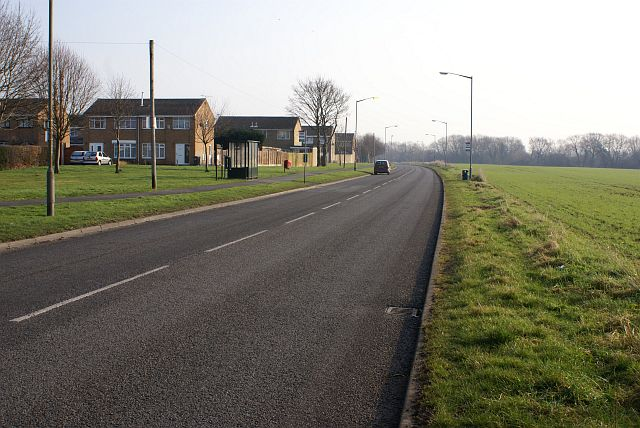
- Wragley Way marks the southern extent of the housing in Stenson Fields

- Location within Derbyshire
- Population: 5,081 (2021 census)
- OS grid reference: SK336309
- Civil parish: Stenson Fields
- District: South Derbyshire
- Shire county: Derbyshire
- Region: East Midlands
- Country: England
- Sovereign state: United Kingdom
- Post town: DERBY
- Postcode district: DE24
- Dialling code: 01332
- Police: Derbyshire
- Fire: Derbyshire
- Ambulance: East Midlands
- UK Parliament: South Derbyshire
- Website: www.stensonfieldspc.org.uk

Stenson Fields is a semi-rural suburban housing development and civil parish in the South Derbyshire district of Derbyshire, England. The parish is contiguous with Sinfin, a southern area of Derby, but is outside the city boundary. Stenson Fields is located approximately 3 miles (4.8 km) south-southwest of Derby city centre. The housing in the area largely dates from the 1970s onwards. In 2021 the parish had a population of 5081.

The parish was created on 1 April 1983 as Sinfin Moor from parts of the neighbouring Barrow upon Trent and Twyford and Stenson parishes. On 1 September 1986 the parish was renamed to "Stenson Fields". Together with Twyford and Stenson, Stenson Fields is part of South Derbyshire district's Stenson electoral ward. Stenson Fields was formally in the Ticknall ward, which stretched from the Derby City boundary to the Leicestershire County line.

There is one school in the parish, Stenson Fields Primary Community School, although a further two schools are planned, one primary and one secondary. There is presently one place of worship, Stenson Fields Christian Fellowship, which is an independent evangelical church. There is a parade of shops and the Stenson Fields public house on Pilgrims Way, opposite the church. Several other amenities, including an Asda supermarket, are located just outside the parish boundary at the Sinfin District Centre.
