= City of Derby Academy =

Location
- Farmhouse Road; Sinfin; Derby, Derbyshire, DE24 3AR; England; 52.8754°N 1.4918°W

Information
- Type: Academy
- Trust: Tapestry Learning Partnership
- Department for Education URN: 145132 Tables
- Ofsted: Reports
- Headteacher: Claire Backhouse
- Gender: Mixed
- Age: 11 to 16
- Enrolment: 976 as of April 2023
- Capacity: 1050
- Colours: Red, Black
- Website: https://www.cityofderbyacademy.org/

City of Derby Academy (formerly Sinfin Community School) is a mixed secondary school located in the Sinfin area of Derby in the English county of Derbyshire.

Previously administered by Derby City Council, Sinfin Community School converted to academy status on 1 June 2013 and was renamed City of Derby Academy. The school is now a part of Tapestry Learning Partnership.

City of Derby Academy offers GCSEs and vocational subjects as programmes of study for pupils.

The school is smaller than the average-sized secondary school and has a capacity of 1050. The proportion of students whose first language is not English is nearly half, which is well above average. The proportion of students from ethnic minority backgrounds is also above half - Romany and Pakistani heritages being the largest.

The building boasts excellent equipment, previously being a specialist technology school. There is also a large AstroTurf sports pitch, a large indoor sports hall, multiple tennis courts and a gymnasium.

== Former teachers ==
- Sue Hay-Carr, Maths and PE teacher from the late 1980s, Olympic sailor in the 470 (dinghy) in 1988, 1992 and 1996
