= Derby Arboretum =

Arboretum in Derby

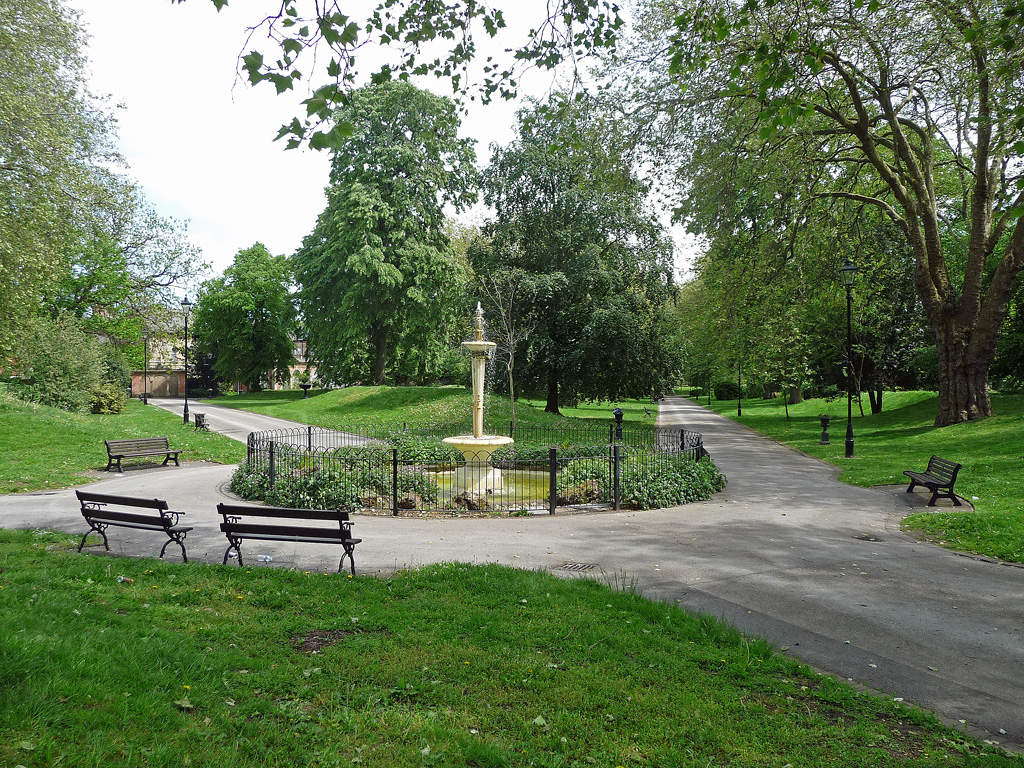
- Pathway through the Arboretum

- Location within Derbyshire
- Type: Arboretum and public park
- Location: Derby, England, United Kingdom
- Coordinates: 52.91432°N 1.47471°W
- Area: 7.5 ha (19 acres)
- Created: 1840
- Founder: Joseph Strutt
- Designer: John Claudius Loudon
- Operator: Derby City Council
- Open: All year

National Register of Historic Parks and Gardens
- Type: Grade II*
- Designated: 4 August 1984
- Reference no.: 1000677

Derby Arboretum is a public park and arboretum in the city of Derby, England, located about 1 mile (1.6 km) south of the city centre in the Rose Hill area. It was opened in 1840, following the donation of the land by local philanthropist Joseph Strutt, and to designs by John Claudius Loudon. It was the first park to be specifically designed for and owned by the public in England, as a direct result of the movement for public walks. After many years of neglect, the Arboretum was extensively refurbished in the early 21st century with the aid of a Heritage Lottery Fund grant of almost £5 million. It is listed as Grade II* on the Historic England Register of Parks and Gardens of Special Historic Interest in England.

== History ==
Derby Arboretum opened in 1840 and is often described as "Britain's first public park". Although green spaces and common lands had existed previously, as had private parkland and gardens, the park in Derby was the first to be deliberately planned as a place of public recreation in an urban setting.

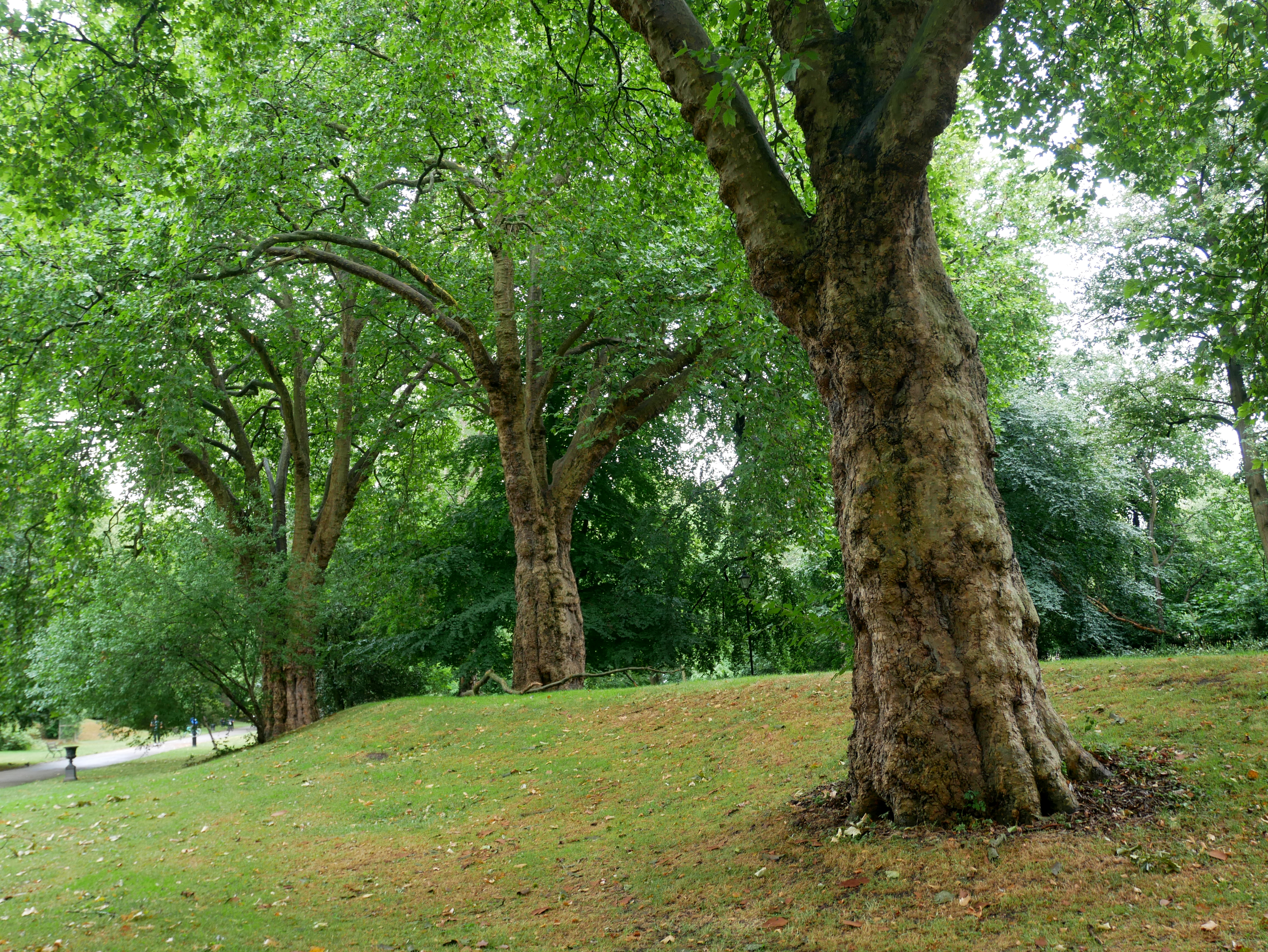
Raised banks from which trees grow are found through much of the Arboretum

The Arboretum was donated to the town in 1840 by Joseph Strutt, a former mayor of Derby and member of a prominent local family of industrialists. A noted philanthropist, Strutt was grateful to the working people of Derby for the part they had played in helping him and his family amass their fortune, and wanted to convey his thanks by providing a much needed recreational facility for a rapidly expanding and urbanising area. Strutt commissioned John Claudius Loudon to design the park, and Loudon adapted Strutt's original plans for a botanical garden and pleasure grounds to his own vision, incorporating landscaped walkways.

Work on the Arboretum commenced in July 1839, and was completed in time for the grand opening which took place on 16 September 1840. The occasion was marked by a parade from the Market Place in the centre of Derby to the new park. The park initially charged for admission, in order to pay for its upkeep. However, admission was free on Sundays and on Wednesdays (which had been adopted as half-day closing in Derby). This meant that the working classes, who had limited leisure time and probably lacked the means to pay admission, could gain free access to the Arboretum when they actually had the time to do so; in effect, the park was paid for by those who had time and money to spare to enjoy the facilities. Free admission times continued to be extended until charging was finally abolished in 1882.

In 1859 the Arboretum was one of a number of parks visited by Frederick Law Olmsted while on a research tour of Europe, and it is thought that he may have incorporated features of Loudon's work into his design for Central Park in New York.

A scene from Ken Russell's 1969 Oscar-winning film Women in Love was shot at the Arboretum. The scene had a brass band playing on the Aslin-designed bandstand whilst Oliver Reed, Alan Bates and Glenda Jackson acted in front of it. The Easter Pavilion had received a coat of paint for the occasion; this was the last work on the building until 2005 when it was fully restored.

== Notable landmarks ==
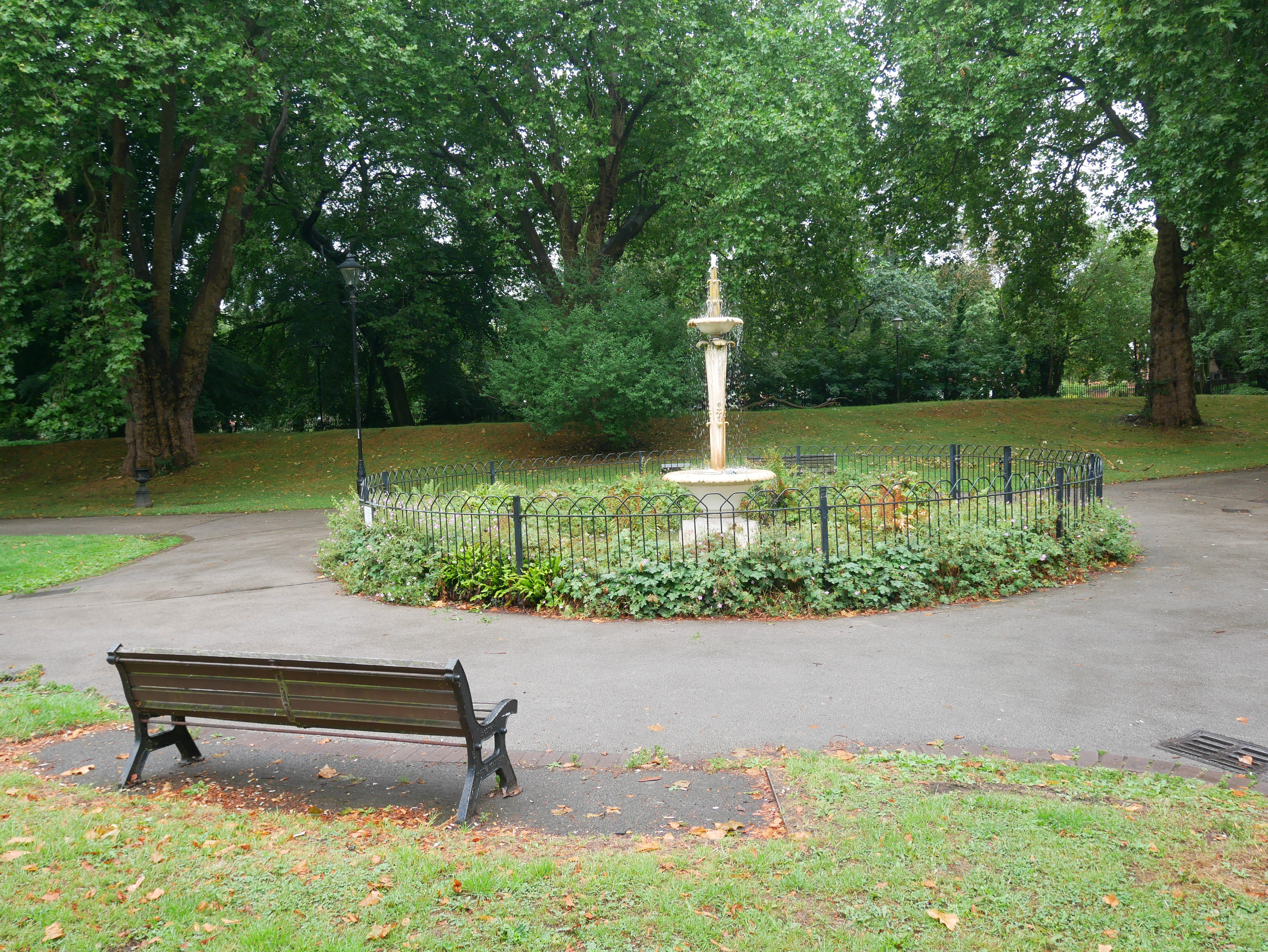
The Arboretum's fountain, designed by Andrew Handyside

Over the years the Arboretum has incorporated a variety of buildings, statues and ornaments. Perhaps the best known locally is the Florentine Boar statue, which was originally placed on the site in 1806, when the land was Joseph Strutt's private garden. Strutt had commissioned William John Coffee, a Crown Derby sculptor, to make an earthenware copy of the bronze statue which he had seen when he once visited the Mercato Nuovo (New Market) in central Florence. The earthenware boar remained in place after the creation of the Arboretum until it was damaged (actually decapitated) during a German air raid on Derby on 15 January 1941. However, a claim was reported in January 2002 that a Derby resident had, as a child, accidentally broken off the boar's head while climbing on the statue. The current statue is a bronze replacement dedicated in 2005.

Other past and present features of the Arboretum include:

- The original "Grand Entrance" from Grove Street and adjacent lodge.
- An elaborate entrance from Arboretum Square, incorporating a statue of Joseph Strutt, completed in 1852.
- An entrance lodge on the Rose Hill Street side.
- A Victorian bandstand, destroyed along with the Boar in 1941.
- An iron and glass building (later nicknamed the Crystal Palace after the building in London) designed by Henry Duesbury was erected at the Rose Hill Street end of the 1845 extension. This was demolished in the 1890s.
- The fountain, originally built in 1846 and recently restored.
- Two bowling greens, home of the Arboretum and Joseph Strutt Bowls Clubs.
- Arboretum Field, an extension to the original area of the park added in 1845. At one time major football matches were played here, notably Derby Junction's victory over Blackburn Rovers in the quarter-finals of the FA Cup in 1888. There are still football pitches here today.

== Restoration ==
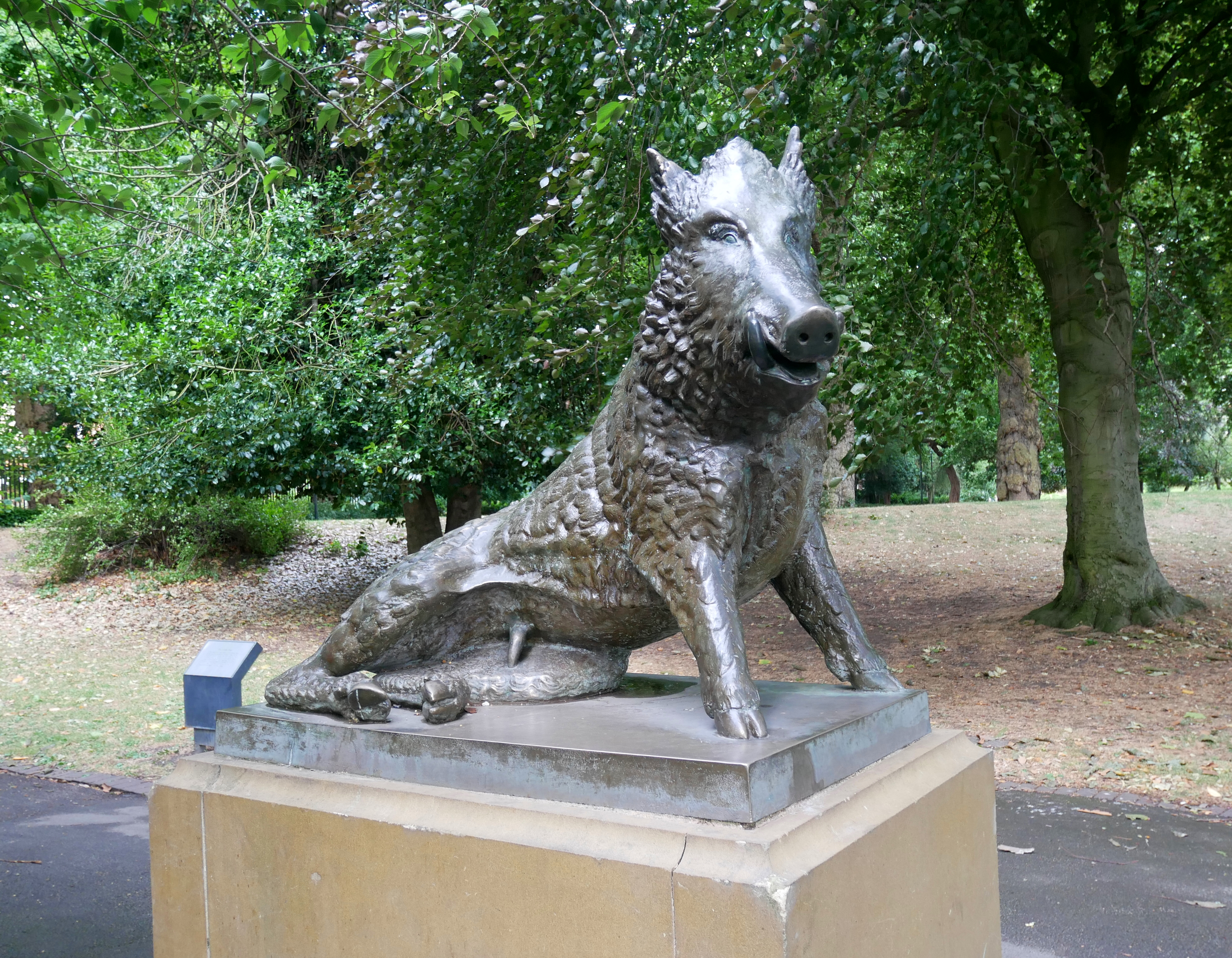
The new bronze copy of the Florentine Boar, by Alex Paxton. This statue replaces the one destroyed in 1941

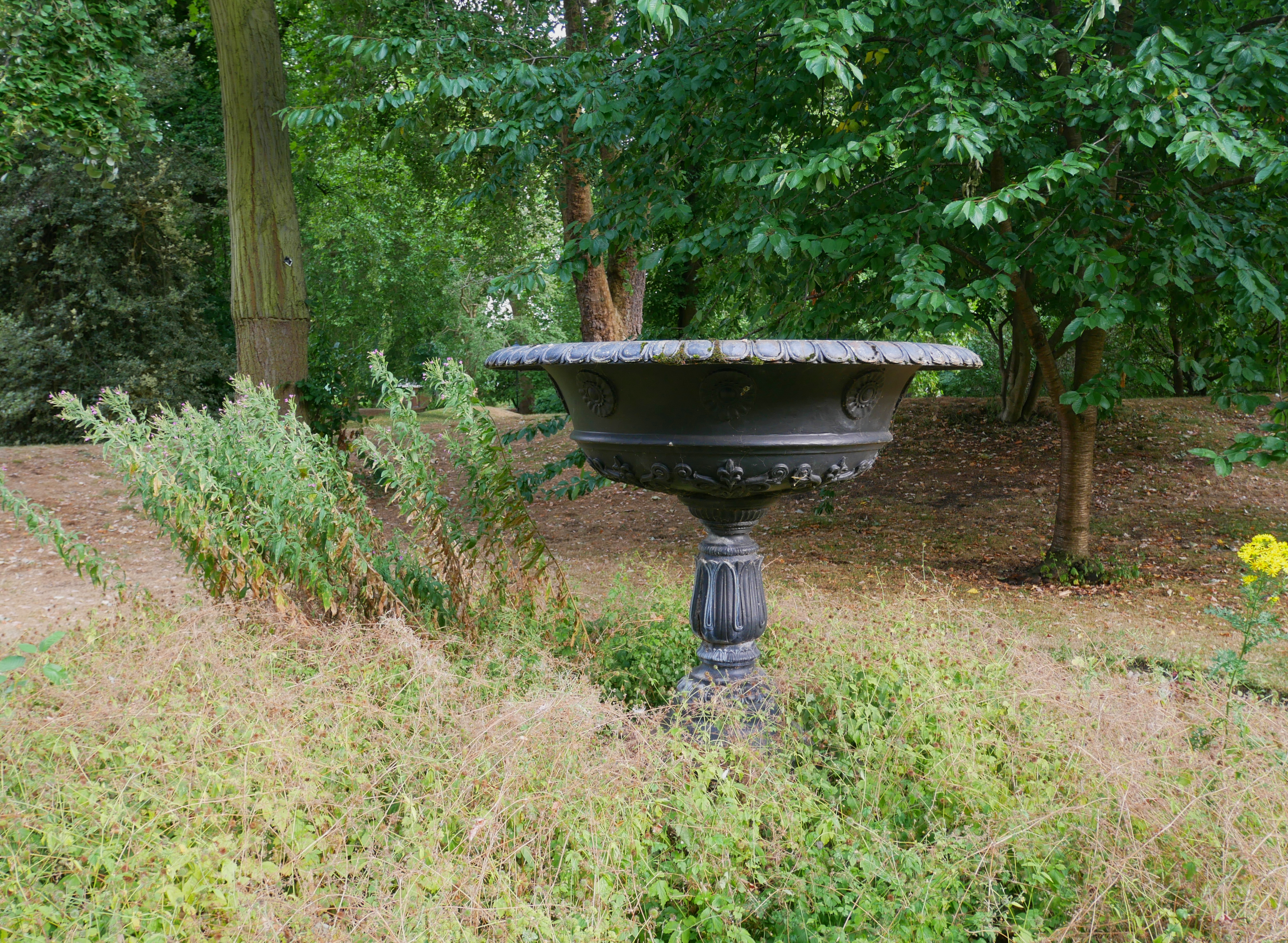
The Grade II listed cast iron urn

In recent decades, vandalism and lack of investment had left the Arboretum in a state of seemingly terminal decline, however this process has been reversed in the light of the recent injection of Lottery money and a determination locally to return this important historic landmark to its former status. Ornaments and buildings have been restored and new ones added. After a long running local campaign, a new bronze replica of the Florentine Boar statue, produced at cost by a local engineer, Alex Paxton, was finally put in place in November 2005.

Other new features include the Heart of the Park building, incorporating community rooms, a café, public toilets and changing rooms for the adjacent sports facilities (basketball courts, cricket net and two astroturf five-a-side football pitches).

The Rose Hill Recreation Ground is an extensive modern playground catering for all age groups of children that has been created within the park.

== See also ==
- Listed buildings in Derby (Arboretum Ward)
