= DE postcode area =

Postcode area within the United Kingdom

Derby
- Postcode area
- Coordinates: 52.932°N 1.499°W
- Country: United Kingdom
- Postcode area: DE
- Postcode area name: Derby
- Post towns: 11
- Postcode districts: 25
- Postcode sectors: 129
- Postcodes (live): 17,235
- Postcodes (total): 30,008
- Statistics as at May 2020

The DE postcode area, also known as the Derby postcode area, is a group of 23 postcode districts in central England, within 11 post towns. These cover south and central Derbyshire (including Derby, Alfreton, Ashbourne, Bakewell, Belper, Heanor, Ilkeston, Matlock, Ripley and Swadlincote), parts of east Staffordshire (including Burton upon Trent) and north-west Leicestershire, and very small parts of Nottinghamshire.

Mail for the DE postcode area is processed at Nottingham Mail Centre, along with mail for the NG postcode area.

== Coverage ==
The approximate coverage of the postcode districts:

Postcode district	Post town	Coverage	Local authority area(s)
DE1	DERBY	Derby C Sector 1: City Centre SW; Sector 2: City Centre SE; Sector 3: City Centre N, West End, Little Chester; Sector 9: Toyota Plant, Large Users; Sector 0: non-geographic	Derby
DE3	DERBY	Sector 9: Mickleover East; Sector 0: Mickleover West	Derby, South Derbyshire
DE4	MATLOCK	Sector 2: Darley Dale, Beeley, Rowsley, Winster, Darley Bridge, Elton, Bonsall; Sector 3: Matlock, Matlock Bath, Cromford; Sector 4: Middleton-by-Wirksworth, Wirksworth, Bolehill; Sector 5: Crich, Holloway, Lea, Tansley	Derbyshire Dales, Amber Valley
DE5	RIPLEY	Sector 3: Ripley, Pentrich, Lower Hartshay; Sector 8: Denby, Marehay; Sector 9: Codnor, Waingroves	Amber Valley
DE6	ASHBOURNE	Ashbourne, Hulland Ward, Weston Underwood	Derbyshire Dales, Amber Valley, South Derbyshire, Derby, East Staffordshire
DE7	ILKESTON	Horsley Woodhouse, Ilkeston, Morley, West Hallam	Erewash, Amber Valley, Broxtowe
DE11	SWADLINCOTE	Swadlincote, Church Gresley, Woodville, Newhall, Hartshorne, Castle Gresley, Blackfordby, Albert Village	South Derbyshire, North West Leicestershire
DE12	SWADLINCOTE	Appleby Magna, Donisthorpe, Linton, Measham, Overseal, Rosliston, Walton-on-Trent	North West Leicestershire, South Derbyshire
DE13	BURTON-ON-TRENT	Alrewas, Barton-under-Needwood, Rolleston on Dove, Tutbury	East Staffordshire, Lichfield
DE14	BURTON-ON-TRENT	Branston, Burton upon Trent	East Staffordshire, South Derbyshire
DE15	BURTON-ON-TRENT	Bretby, Stapenhill, Newton Solney, Winshill	East Staffordshire, South Derbyshire
DE21	DERBY	Derby NE; Sector 2: Oakwood, Derby; Sectors 4 and 6: Chaddesden, Derby; Sector 5: Little Eaton, Breadsall, Coxbench; Sector 7: Spondon, Derby	Derby, Erewash, Amber Valley
DE22	DERBY	Derby NW; Sector 1: Darley Abbey, Derby; Sector 2: Allestree, Derby; Sector 3: New Zealand, Derby; Sector 4: Mackworth, Derby, Mackworth (village); Sector 5: Quarndon, Kedleston	Derby, Amber Valley
DE23	DERBY	Derby SW; Sectors 1 and 2: Sunny Hill, Derby; Sector 3: Heatherton Village, Highfields; Sectors 4 and 6: Littleover, Derby; Sector 8: Normanton Derby, Pear Tree, Derby	Derby, South Derbyshire
DE24	DERBY	Derby SE; Sector 1: City Point Estate, Derby; Sector 3: Stenson Fields; Sector 5: Boulton Moor; Sector 8: Pride Park, Wilmorton, Derby, Osmaston, Derby, Crewton; Sector 9: Sinfin, Derby, Allenton, Derby, Shelton Lock, Derby; Sector 0: Alvaston, Derby, Boulton, Derby	Derby, South Derbyshire
DE45	BAKEWELL	Sector 1: Ashford-in-the-Water, Bakewell, Baslow, Chatsworth, Edensor, Hassop, Monyash, Youlgreave; Sector 9: non-geographic	Derbyshire Dales
DE55	ALFRETON	Sector 1: Swanwick, Leabrooks; Sectors 2 and 3: South Normanton; Sector 4: Riddings, Greenhill Lane, Somercotes; Sector 5: Tibshelf, Newton, Blackwell, Hilcote; Sector 6: Wessington, Higham, Stonebroom, Morton, Shirland; Sector 7: Alfreton, South Wingfield	Amber Valley, Bolsover
DE56	BELPER	Ambergate, Belper, Duffield, Heage, Holbrook, Kilburn, Milford	Amber Valley
DE65	DERBY	Burnaston, Egginton, Etwall, Findern, Hatton, Hilton, Milton, Repton, Willington	South Derbyshire
DE72	DERBY	Ambaston, Aston-on-Trent, Borrowash, Breaston, Church Wilne, Draycott, Elvaston, Ockbrook, Risley, Shardlow, Weston-on-Trent	Erewash, South Derbyshire, North West Leicestershire
DE73	DERBY	Derby (Chellaston); Barrow upon Trent, Ingleby, Melbourne, Stanton by Bridge, Swarkestone, Ticknall	Derby, South Derbyshire
DE74	DERBY	Castle Donington, Kegworth, Diseworth, Hemington, Lockington, East Midlands Airport	North West Leicestershire, Rushcliffe
DE75	HEANOR	Heanor, Loscoe, Shipley	Amber Valley
DE99	DERBY		non-geographic

== History ==
Until approximately 1992, most of the districts were different:

- There was a DE2, corresponding to current DE21 and DE24.
- DE3 covered DE22 and DE23 in addition to its current area.
- DE4 included DE45
- DE5 included DE55 and the bulk of DE56
- DE6 included DE65 and part of DE56
- DE7 included DE72-75

== Map ==
DE postcode area map, showing postcode districts in red and post towns in grey text, with links to nearby B, CV, LE, NG, S, SK, ST and WS postcode areas.

== See also ==
- List of postcode areas in the United Kingdom
- Postcode Address File
