= Derby Moor Academy =

Location
- Moorway Lane; Derby, Derbyshire, DE23 2FS; England; 52°53′44″N 1°30′52″W

Information
- Type: Academy
- Established: 2018
- Local authority: Derby
- Trust: The Spencer Academies Trust
- Department for Education URN: 145327 Tables
- Ofsted: Reports
- Principal: Scott Doyle
- Gender: Coeducational
- Age: 11 to 18
- Enrolment: 1515
- Houses: Dedication, Participation, Solidarity, Honour, Spirit also with house managers
- Colours: Black & White with Blue, Green, Red and Yellow
- Website: https://www.derbymoor.derby.sch.uk/

Derby Moor Academy, the successor school to Derby Moor Community Sports College Trust, formerly known as Derby Moor Community School, is a coeducational secondary school and sixth form situated on Moorway Lane, Littleover, Derby. It was established in January 2018 when the school converted to Academy status and joined the Spencer Academies Trust. It can also be seen as the successor to Derby School, which closed in 1989, resulting in Derby Moor opening in the same year with a new headteacher and governing body, although the buildings, pupils and most of the teaching staff were the same.

The school now consists of 2 buildings the main building and the MFL (modern foreign languages) building which opened to students in late 2019. Scott Doyle is the current principal.

The school has its own sixth form, established in 2013. Prior to this, the school had a joint sixth form centre, The Millennium Centre, with neighbouring school Littleover Community School, which opened in 1999. Ivy House Special School is also located on the same site but in separate buildings.

== School system ==
The current school system uses horizontal tutoring, with 10 tutor groups in each year (15 in year 11). There are five houses, taking inspiration from the Olympic values and rings, these are; Solidarity (red), Participation (black), Honour (yellow), Dedication (blue) and Spirit (green). Each house has its own 'house manager' who looks after the forms within the house.

On 1 January 2010 the school became a Foundation School this allowed the school greater control over its finances. At the same time it established a trust (Derby Pride Trust) which has charitable status. The trust partners are, at the moment, Derby County Football Club, Ivy House Special School, NHS Derby City and Derby City Council Sport & Leisure. A joint venture, as part of the trust, between Derby Moor and DCFC saw the Derby Pride Academy opened as the first free school in Derby.

== Curriculum ==
The houses of the school; Solidarity, Participation, Honour, Dedication and Spirit, are linked with different areas of the curriculum or faculty, meaning that the forms are based in a certain subject area with the form tutor teaching within it. The houses correspond as follows:

- Dedication - Science & Technology
  - Biology
  - Chemistry
  - Physics
  - Food
  - Product Design
- Honour - PACE (Physical & Creative Education)
  - Art
  - Dance
  - Drama
  - Music
  - Physical Education
- Solidarity - Communications
  - English (Language & Literature)
  - French
  - Punjabi
  - Media Studies
  - Urdu
  - Spanish
- Spirit - Maths & ICT
  - ICT
  - Maths
  - Business studies
  - Computer Science
- Participation - Humanities & PSHE
  - Geography
  - History
  - Humanities
  - Psychology
  - Religious Studies
  - Sociology

== Buildings ==
=== 1964-2011 ===
The first buildings on the site were built in the 1960s, consisting of Stenson (prefabricated concert panels and steel construction) and Derwent (steel and brick construction). These were built for the former Derby School, and the Derwent building contained several kinds of memorabilia from the old school site, including war memorials, honours boards in the hall with lists the achievements of former pupils, and a mosaic in the entrance hall of the school's badge and motto.

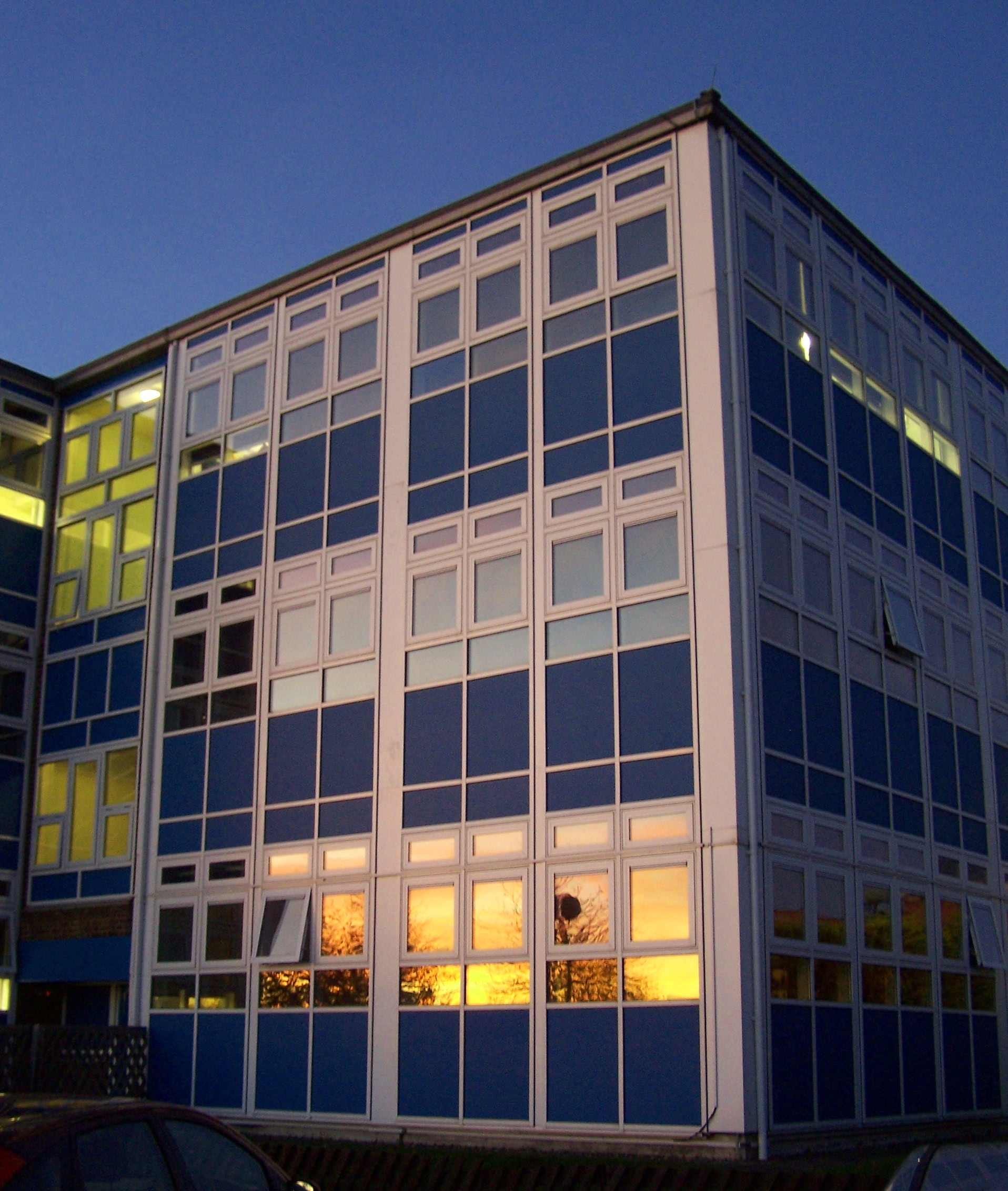
Derwent Building contained memorabilia of the former Derby School.

Cromford building before the school was rebuilt.

In 1992 there was a fire in part of the Stenson building, resulting in demolition of the damaged area. A new building, Cromford, was constructed on the tennis courts that were close to the entrance of the school, with the area that had been cleared becoming new tennis courts. The Cromford building was opened in 1993 by local member of parliament Margaret Beckett. The Markeaton building was built in 1999 to house The Millennium Centre, it consisted of terrapin blocks that had been linked together. Other temporary buildings were added to the site as the school outgrew its capacity, including the music block and seclusion area. Following a grant in the mid-2000s, an astroturf pitch was constructed on the south side of the site, together with extra changing rooms, and a few years later a gym, which was built thanks to a grant from Sport England because of Ivy House Special School being built on one of the top fields to the north.

=== Building Schools for the Future ===
The front of Derby Moor Community Sports College in November 2011.

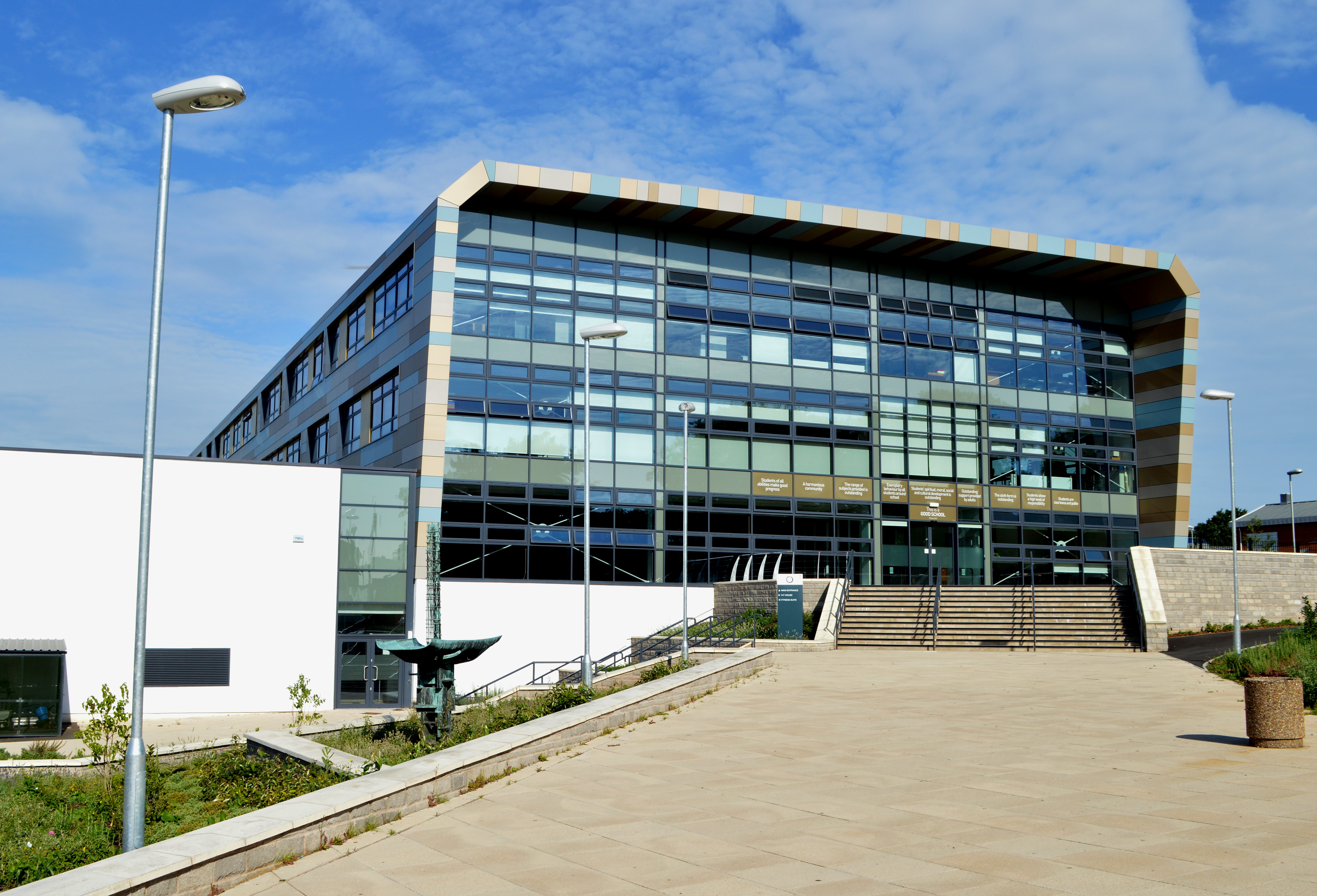
College front August 2013. Note legends above entrance.

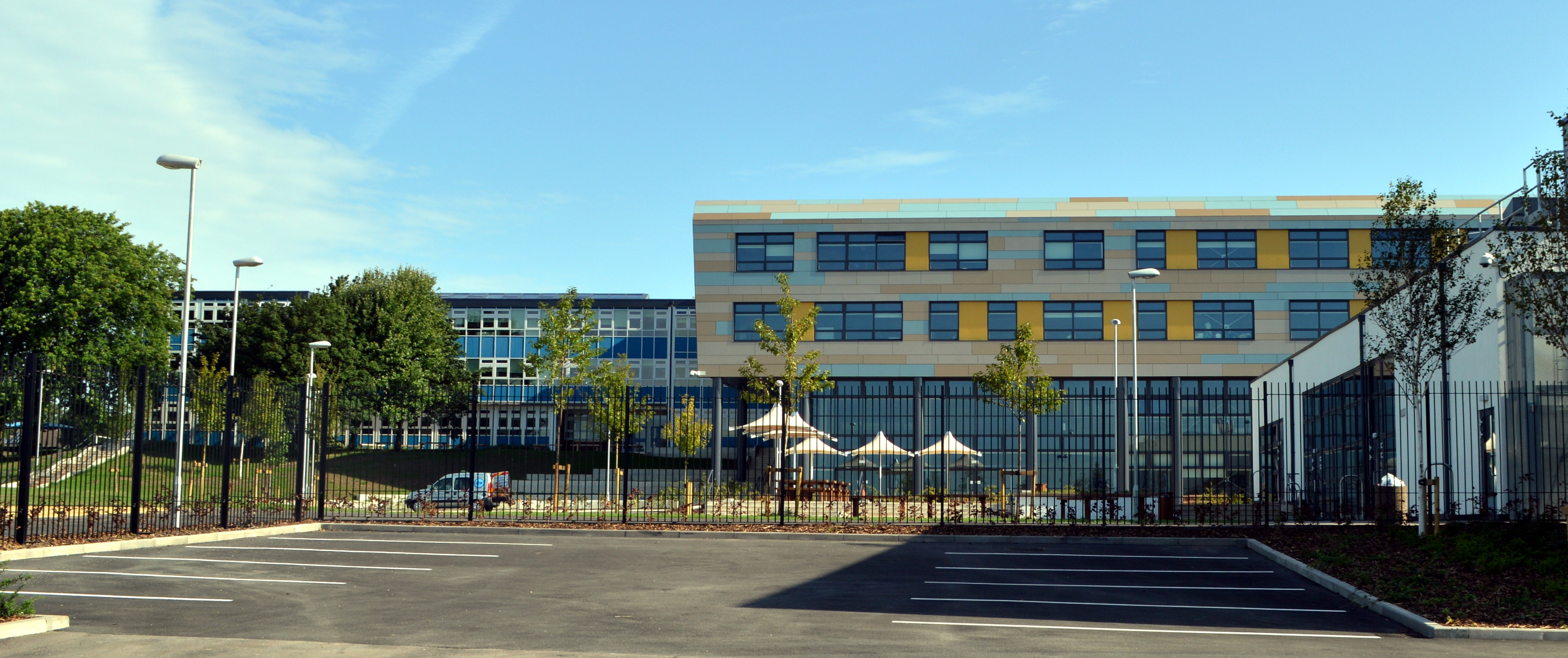
College south aspect featuring part of original Derby School buildings.

Derby Moor took part in the Building Schools for the Future (BSF) program, being one of the test schools for Derby City along with Noel-Baker Community School. The school had a partial refurbishment and a partial new build at a cost of £19 million, including £3 million on IT equipment. The new building and refurbishment was designed by Hawkins\Brown as the main architects, Fabric as landscape architects and Cundall Johnston and Partners as the structural, mechanical and electrical engineer. These companies partnered with Balfour Beatty to win preferred bidder status in 2010.

The new building was designed to link together Derwent building and what was to remain of Stenson building, after it was decided that these two were to be kept. The remainder of Stenson's fabric was too damaged to be of use and Cromford, due to its construction methods, had inefficient energy usage and poor acoustics. The new building, known as the Learning Barn would provide many of the more complex facilities such as the science and technology labs and ICT suites. This allows the older buildings to provide what they are able to in terms of learning spaces as they are restricted due to the arrangement of the original steel work. The rooms and facilities are grouped in accordance with the house system; Dedication, Honour, Solidarity, Spirit and Participation respectively. There is a 'Hub' area in each faculty containing IT facilities and open learning space. In addition to this there is a main hub that contains the dining area, Flexible Learning Centre (which contains the library and IT facilities) and the sixth form centre (The Millennium Centre).

After uncertainty around whether funding would be given due to spending cuts by the UK Government, construction started in January 2011. In January 2012 the PACE faculty opened, this being contained in what remains of Stenson building, this included the refurbished sports hall. The rest of the building was due to open in September 2012, but due to rusting within the existing frames of Derwent building extended foundational works had to be carried out, delaying the opening. These foundational problems were found when stripping the back of Derwent building within the process of refurbishment, the problems couldn't have been identified earlier as this would have required an intrusive survey which could not be possible to be carried out when the building was a learning environment. After the refurbishment was fully completed, the demolition of the other buildings was to commence afterwards. The school opened in January 2013 and the official opening ceremony took place on 28 June 2013 as a community event.

== Notable former pupils ==
- Lee Camp, goalkeeper for Nottingham Forest and Northern Ireland national football team.
- Fiona May, British-born Italian track and field athlete who competed in the long jump.
