= Littleover Community School =

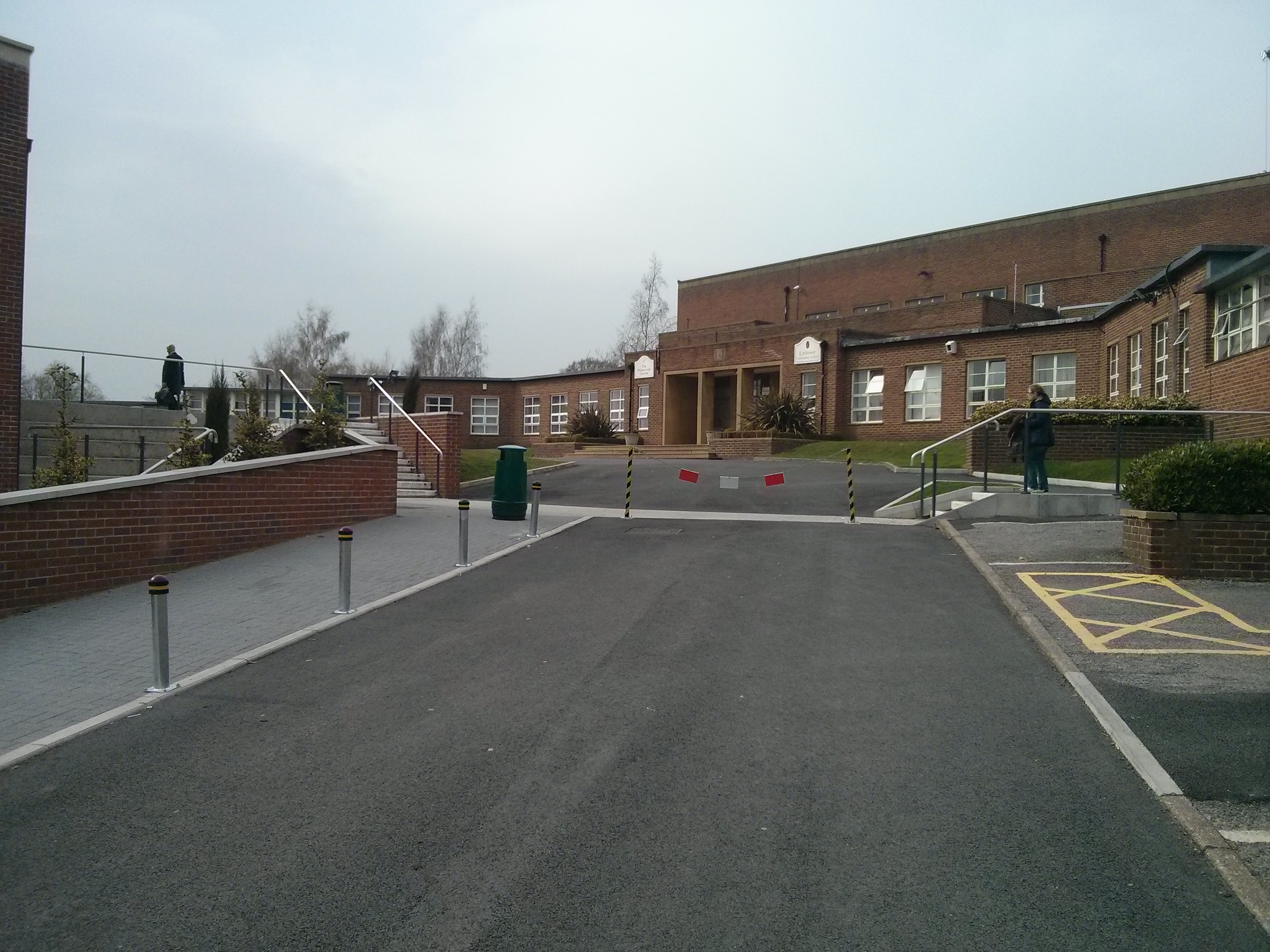

Location
- Pastures Hill; Derby, Derbyshire, DE23 4BZ; England; 52°53′59″N 1°31′32″W

Information
- Type: Comprehensive community school
- Motto: Bene Consulendo
- Religious affiliation: mixed
- Established: 1949
- Local authority: Derby
- Department for Education URN: 112956 Tables
- Ofsted: Reports
- Headteacher: Laura Johnson
- Staff: 103
- Gender: Coeducational
- Age: 11 to 18
- Enrolment: 1550
- Colours: Black, Red & White
- Website: http://www.littleover.derby.sch.uk/

Littleover Community School is a coeducational secondary school situated on Pastures Hill, Littleover, Derbyshire in England, with pupils aged 11–18.

It is a co-educational non-denominational school which educates over 1,550 pupils from in and around Derby. It has previously held Science Mathematics and Languages specialist school status, and has good academic results, both at GCSE and A-Level. The current head teacher is Laura Johnson.

The school has its own Sixth Form Centre which was originally The Millennium Centre, a joint Sixth Form Centre with Derby Moor Community Sports College which opened in 1999, but disbanded in 2013 after Littleover’s Sixth Form became independent from Derby Moor and is now known as Littleover Community School Sixth Form Centre.

The new humanities block opened in October 2014. The school is located on Pastures Hill but also can be reached by fresco drive which follows the route of the Roman Icknield Street, and a short distance away from the school there are buried remains of this highway.

== Notable alumni ==
- Kay Benbow, British broadcasting executive, Controller of the BBC channel CBeebies from 2010 to 2017
- Hugo Milner, British triathlete and cross-country runner. He won the English national cross country title in 2024
- Lewin Nyatanga, football player currently playing for Barnsley Football Club
- Jasvinder Sanghera CBE, author and campaigner
- Noky Simbani, model
- Lucy Ward, folk musician - winner of the BBC Radio 2 Folk Awards "Horizon Award" in 2012
