= Derby Airport =

Derby Airport may refer to:

- Derby Airport (Western Australia), airport in Derby, Western Australia
- Derby Airport (England), former airport in Burnaston, Derbyshire

== See also ==
- Derby Airfield, airfield located at Egginton, Derbyshire, England
