= Listed buildings in Mickleover =

Mickleover is an electoral ward in the city of Derby, England. The ward contains 13 listed buildings that are recorded in the National Heritage List for England. Of these, two are listed at Grade II*, the middle of the three grades, and the others are at Grade II, the lowest grade. The ward contains the village of Mickleover, later a suburb of the city, to the southwest of its centre. All the listed buildings are near the centre of the village, and consist of houses and cottages with associated structures, a church and a war memorial.

== Key ==
Grade	Criteria
II*	Particularly important buildings of more than special interest
II	Buildings of national importance and special interest

== Buildings ==
Name and location	Photograph	Date	Notes	Grade
All Saints' Church; 52.90444°N 1.54761°W		Early 14th century	The church has been altered and extended through the centuries, and it was damaged by fire in 1767. Alterations were made in 1858–59 by H. I. Stevens, and additions were made in 1965–67. It is built in stone with a slate roof, and consists of a nave, north and south aisles, a south porch, a chancel, a vestry and a north aisle chapel, and a west tower. The tower has angle buttresses, and an embattled parapet with corner pinnacles.	II*
4 The Hollow; 52.90317°N 1.54437°W		14th century	The house is timber framed with red brick nogging, the exterior dating from the late 16th to early 17th century. It has a deep stone base, a tile roof, two storeys and an attic. The doorway has a plain surround and a modern porch, the windows are casements, and there are two gabled dormers.	II
1 and 2 The Hollow; 52.90352°N 1.54506°W		Late 14th century	A pair of houses, No. 2 containing internal fabric dating from the 14th and 16th centuries, and the exterior of both houses dating from the late 18th to early 19th centuries. The exterior is in red brick on a rendered plinth, with stone dressings and a blue tile roof. There are two storeys and each house has two bays. No. 1 has a doorway with a timber gabled hood, pilasters and a rectangular fanlight. It is flanked by tripartite sash windows with segmental-arched heads, and the upper floor contains three sash windows under a dog-tooth eaves course. The doorway of No. 2 has pilasters and a cornice, it is flanked by three-light horizontally-sliding sash windows, above are two sash windows, and all the windows have deep lintels.	II
Old Hall; 52.90284°N 1.54755°W		1649	The house is timber framed with red brick nogging, on a stone plinth, and the roof is tiled. There are two storeys and an attic, and a double pile plan. In the centre of the front is a two-storey gabled porch, the upper floor jettied. The sides are open, with balusters, and on the bressummer is an inscription. The windows are mullioned, with three cast iron lattice lights.	II*
Gate piers, Old Hall; 52.90286°N 1.54742°W	—	Late 17th century	The gate piers are in stone, and have consoles with heavy cornices and large ball finials.	II
The Gables; 52.90376°N 1.54515°W		17th or 18th century	The house is in red brick with floor bands and a tile roof. There are two storeys and attics, four bays, and a single-story extension on the right. On the front are two gables with decorative bargeboards, and two gabled porches with plain doorways. Some of the windows are 19th-century casements and others are replacements.	II
11 Limes Avenue; 52.90369°N 1.54380°W	—	18th century	The house, which may have an earlier core, is in red brick on a stone plinth, with a floor band, sprocket eaves and a tile roof. There are two storeys and three bays. The doorway and the windows, which are casements, have segmental heads.	II
Manor Farmhouse; 52.90486°N 1.54605°W		Late 18th or early 19th century	The farmhouse, which probably has an earlier core, is in red brick with plain eaves and a tile roof. There are two storeys and five bays, and the gable end faces the road. The central doorway has pilasters, a rectangular fanlight and a cornice hood, and the windows are small-paned with cast iron frames and opening lights.	II
13–18 The Green; 52.90294°N 1.54668°W		Early 19th century	A row of cottages in red brick with dog-tooth eaves and a slate roof. There are two storeys and each cottage has one bay. The doorways and most of the windows, which are a mix of sashes and casements, have cambered heads. Between Nos. 13 and 14 is an archway with a segmental-arched head.	II
5–8 The Hollow; 52.90296°N 1.54412°W		Early 19th century	A range of cottages in two blocks. They are in red brick, partly painted, with modillion eaves, and roofs of tile and slate. There are two storeys, and the blocks are joined by a brick segmental arch. The doorway in the left block has a round-arched head and a semicircular fanlight, and in the right block are two doorways with segmental heads, one blocked. The windows are a mix of casements, and horizontally-sliding sashes, those in the ground floor with segmental heads.	II
The Limes; 52.90325°N 1.54185°W		Early 19th century	A large stuccoed house with corner pilasters, a floor band, overhanging eaves, and a hipped slate roof. There are two storeys, and fronts of five bays. On the entrance front is a porch with Doric columns, angle piers, and an entablature, and in the centre of the garden front is a two-storey bow window. The windows are sashes.	II
Mickleover Manor; 52.90420°N 1.54890°W		1849	A large house designed by Henry Duesbury in Tudor style, it was enlarged in 1862, and later used as a school and a hospital, before being divided into flats. The house is in red brick with stone dressings, floor bands, and a tile roof with coped gables and obelisk finials. There are two storeys and attics, and a four-stage tower with a stone cornice and an embattled parapet. The windows are mullioned, and most also have transoms and hood moulds.	II
War memorial 52.90395°N 1.54697°W		1920	The war memorial is in the churchyard of All Saints' Church and is in Hopton Wood stone. It is in the form of a Latin cross, with a tapering shaft on a trapezoidal plinth that has a moulded top, on a base of two steps. On the plinth are bronze plaques with inscriptions and the names of those lost in the two World Wars.	II
