= Soundcraft (disambiguation) =

Soundcraft, SoundCraft or Sound Craft may refer to:

- Reeves Soundcraft, a former US audio and video equipment manufacturer founded by Hazard E. Reeves in 1946
- Harman Soundcraft, a former British audio and studio equipment manufacturer founded by Phil Dudderidge and Graham Blyth in 1973, now owned by Harman
- Conrad Soundcraft, a former brand of the German retailer Conrad Electronic in the 1980s and 1990s
