= Mickleover =

Village in Derbyshire, England

Coordinates: 52.901°N 1.552°W

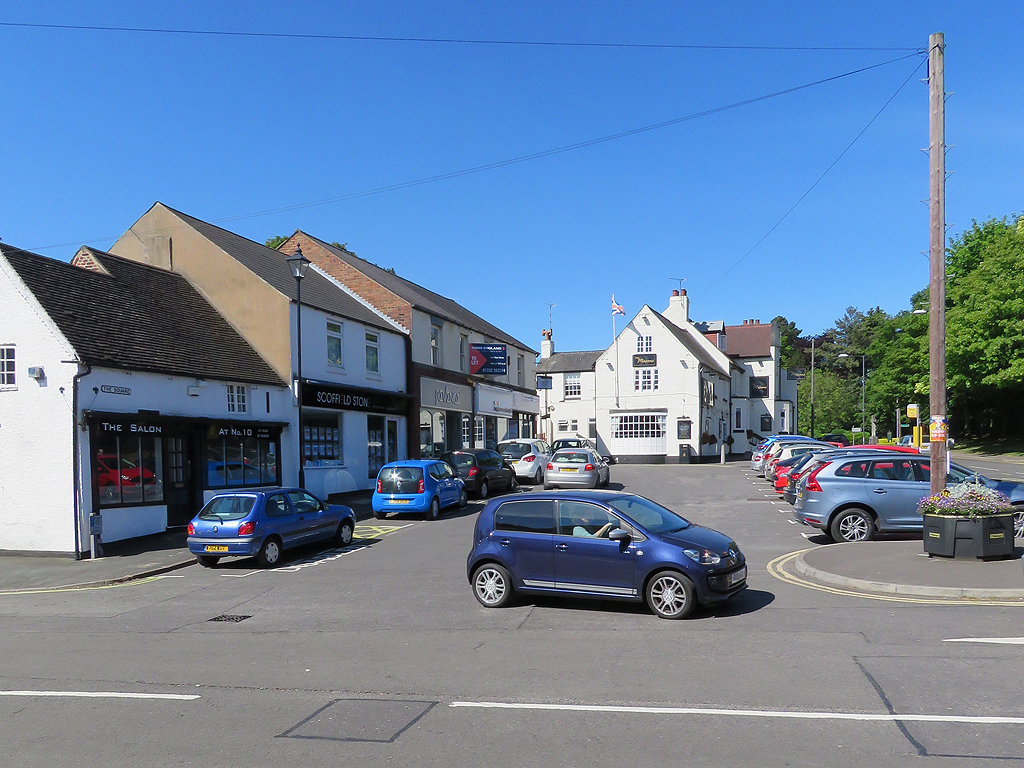
- The Square, Mickleover

- Location within Derbyshire
- Population: 18,000
- OS grid reference: SK302338
- Unitary authority: Derby
- Ceremonial county: Derbyshire
- Region: East Midlands
- Country: England
- Sovereign state: United Kingdom
- Post town: DERBY
- Postcode district: DE3
- Dialling code: 01332
- Police: Derbyshire
- Fire: Derbyshire
- Ambulance: East Midlands
- UK Parliament: Derby North

Mickleover is a village in the unitary authority of Derby, in Derbyshire, England. It is 2 miles (3.2 km) west of Derby, 10 miles (16 km) northeast of Burton upon Trent, 13 miles (21 km) southeast of Ashbourne and 12 miles (19 km) northeast of Uttoxeter.

== History ==
The earliest recorded mention of Mickleover (and its close neighbour, Littleover) comes in 1011, when an early charter has King Aethelred granting Morcar, a high-ranking Mercian Thegn, land along the Trent and in Eastern Derbyshire, including land in the Mickleover and Littleover areas, consolidating estates he had inherited in North-East Derbyshire from his kinsman through marriage, Wulfric Spot, who founded Burton Abbey on the Staffs-Derbys border.

Mickleover appears in Domesday Book when it was still owned by the abbey. At the time of the Domesday Survey, 1086, Mickleover was known as Magna (the Old English version of this is Micel) Oufra. Magna, in early Latin means Great; oufra coming from Anglo Saxon ofer, flat-topped ridge. The oldest parts of the village now are located along Uttoxeter Road (B5020). In 1961 the civil parish had a population of 9709. On 1 April 1968 the parish was abolished and merged with Derby, Burnaston, Findern and Radbourne and was transferred to the County Borough of Derby from Repton Rural District. The resident population of Mickleover ward in 2003 was 13,528. The current population is estimated to be in excess of 18,000. Mickleover also has a mention in the earliest beginnings of the industrial revolution. The first industrial scale textile factory, a silk mill, was built in 1717 by John Lombe in Derby. Lombe had gained his experience processing silk in the smaller factory built and run by Thomas Cotchett of Mickleover. Cotchett's factory was perhaps the first germ of industrial manufacture. Cotchett was born in Mickleover the son of Robert Cotchett, an officer in Cromwell's army during the English civil war. Thomas Cotchett lived in Orchard Street in Mickleover in what is now known as "The Old Hall" which was built by Robert Cotchett between 1640 and 1650. The house represents a fine example of a timber-frame building and is one of a few still remaining in the area and is the oldest house in Mickleover.

== Geography ==
Mickleover is directly west of the city of Derby and has seen multiple developments take place over the decades changing the town from a historic village to a suburb. Construction of the £5.2m Mickleover bypass (A516/A38) began in April 1972 and it was opened on 19 February 1975. Mickleover also benefits from its close connections to the cities of Derby, Nottingham, Lichfield, Stoke-on-Trent, Birmingham, Manchester and Sheffield among other towns and cities. Mickleover also sits directly close to the Staffordshire border near the town of Burton upon Trent.

== Army Cadet Force ==
Mickleover is home to the Mickleover Army Cadet Force Detachment.

== Railway history ==
The railway line which passed through Mickleover originally formed part of the Great Northern Railway's Derbyshire Extension route from Grantham to Stafford and was opened in April 1878. It ran from Grantham on the East Coast Main Line via Nottingham Victoria, over Bennerley Viaduct (which still stands today) to Derby Friargate Station. This section of the Great Northern Railway, also known as the Friargate Line, (for further history about this now closed railway see GNR Derbyshire and Staffordshire Extension), was built as a rival to the already established Midland Railway which at the time had a monopoly over Derby, Nottingham and the surrounding areas.

At Egginton Junction it joined the Derby to Crewe line of the North Staffordshire Railway which it left at Bromshall Junction near Uttoxeter to journey on to Stafford. There was also a line from Egginton Junction via Dove Junction to Burton-on-Trent. Mickleover station (also called Mickleover for Radbourne) lay on the Derby – Egginton section, and was located about 1-mile (1.6 km) from the centre of the town.

Although most of the line was closed to passenger traffic in December 1939, Mickleover station remained open until 3 February 1964. The final passenger train left Friargate on 5 September 1964 and the line then closed throughout to passenger traffic on 7 September 1964. The section between Egginton Jcn. and Friargate was acquired by the Train Control Group of the BR Research Division, as a test track. It was singled between Friargate and Mickleover, but in 1973 the line was cut back to Mickleover since the eastern end of the track bed had been earmarked for the new A38 trunk road. Thereafter the line was used as a test track until 1990 when the A516 feeder road to the A50 by-pass was built over the trackbed and the line was closed and lifted.

The station building at Mickleover survives as a private residence. The route of the line is now a cycle track to Egginton and nature path with little to indicate its former status.

== University campus ==
Mickleover from May 1964 until June 2007, housed a small 35-acre (14 ha) campus of the University of Derby which in 2007-8 made way for nearly 700 new homes. The campus was formerly the Bishop Lonsdale College of Education, run by the Church of England (Derby Diocese), and housed the Education and Health departments as well as some social science courses. In late 2007 a new scout hut for the 166th Mickleover Scouts was also built on the site of the University Campus (Derby Campus).

== Schools ==
Mickleover has a number of primary schools: Wren Park Primary, Mickleover Primary, Brookfield Primary, Silverhill Primary and Ravensdale Infants and Ravensdale Junior school. There is also a secondary school, Murray Park School, which also borders the edge of Mackworth. Many residents of Mickleover, however, attend John Port Spencer Academy, or Littleover Community School at both of which it can be difficult to obtain a place because of high demand.

The town has two C of E churches – the 1960s St John the Evangelist and the older All Saints. There is also a Methodist chapel and a Roman Catholic church on Uttoxeter Road called Our Lady of Lourdes. All Saints once contained an infant school, as did the Old Tea Rooms, now known as the Mickleover Community Centre.

== Sports ==
Mickleover F.C. is a semi-professional football team. They are based at the Mickleover Sports Club on Station Road and are members of the Northern Premier League Division One Midlands. The suburb also had another non-league team, Mickleover Royal British Legion F.C. who last played in the Central Midlands Football League.

Along with the above-mentioned Mickleover football teams, the town is also home to many junior sports teams. A notable example being the Mickleover Lightning Sox football team who are listed in the Guinness World Records 2005 for being involved in the longest penalty shootout.

Mickleover Golf Club, founded in 1923, is located off Uttoxeter Road.

Mickleover Running Club is an England Athletics affiliated running club.

== Hospitals and health centres ==
The former Derby County Mental Hospital, later known as Pastures Hospital, was opened in 1851 on Merlin Way, south west of the centre of Mickleover. The hospital closed in 1994 and was converted to housing, named Duesbury Court after the hospital's architect, Henry Duesbury.

Mickleover Medical Centre is an NHS health centre located on Vicarage Road.

== Notable people ==
- Ben Warren (1879–1917), England international and Derby County footballer, was inmate at the Pastures Hospital from 1912 to his death.
- David Hampshire (1917–1990), racing driver.
- Patrick Allitt (born 1956), historian and academic.

== See also ==
- Listed buildings in Mickleover
