= Karl and the Marx Brothers =

Karl & the Marx Brothers
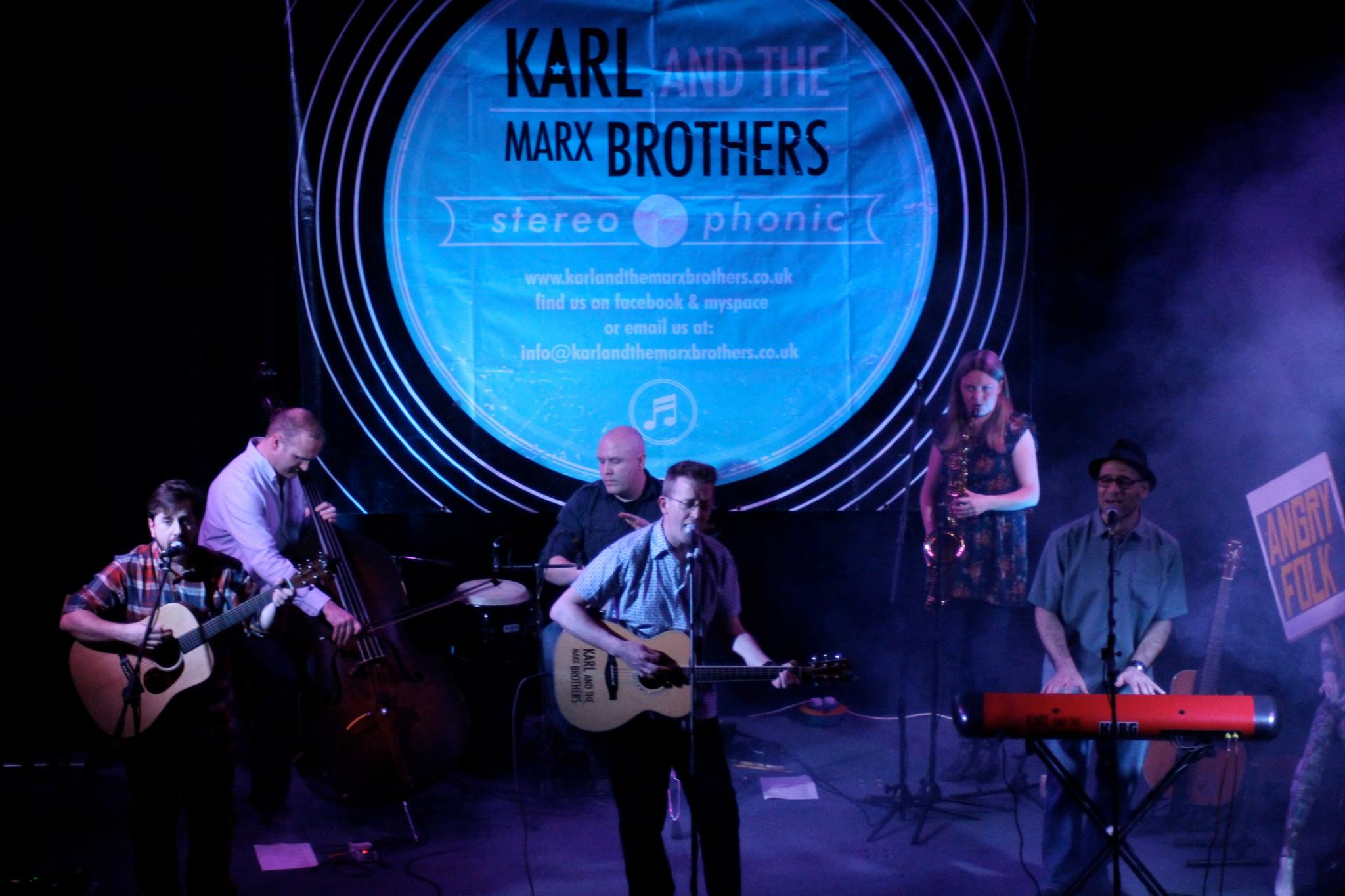

Background information
- Origin: Derby, England
- Genres: Folk
- Years active: 2011-present
- Labels: Furthest From The Sea
- Members: Eileen Wright; Adam Silverstein; Nigel Hart; Chris White; Matt McGuinness
- Website: www.karlandthemarxbrothers.co.uk

Karl and the Marx Brothers is an English indie folk group from Derby, England. In 2013, they released their debut album Angry Folk on Furthest From The Sea recordings.

== Career ==
Formed in 2011, the band's material is political in nature, tackling subjects such as the WikiLeaks scandal and Julian Assange ("Rhymes With Blancmange"), and the MPs' expenses scandal. The latter was the subject of the song "The Relative Innocence of David Laws" and caused some controversy in the MP's constituency.

On 9 November 2012, Matt Mcguinness from the band was interviewed by Andy Potter on BBC Radio Derby.

On 12 April 2013, the band released their debut album following a launch party at Derby Guildhall Theatre. The album received a four star rating from Boff Whalley in R2 magazine. In December of that year the band appeared on BBC Radio Derby on the Sally Pepper show.

During the first half of 2014, the band toured the UK taking in dates in Nottingham, London, Liverpool, Oldham, Hartlepool, Portishead and Melbourne. In February the band appeared in session for BBC Introducing in Derbyshire, and also appeared on BBC Radio Nottingham. Later in the year they will be performing at the Furthest From The Sea Festival in June and the Y Not festival in August.

== Discography ==
=== Studio albums ===
Year	Album
2011	Angry Folk: Released 12 April 2013; Label: Furthest From The Sea

== Members ==
Current members

- Eileen Wright – saxophone, tin whistle (2011–present)
- Adam Silverstein – keyboards, backing vocals (2011–present)
- Nigel Hart – double bass (2011–2014)
- Chris White – percussion (2013–present)
- Matt McGuinness – vocals, guitar (2011–present)
- Lindsey Wilcox-Reid – cello, backing vocals (2014–present)
