= Mackworth, Derby =

Suburb of Derby, England

Coordinates: 52.92771°N 1.53733°W

Mackworth
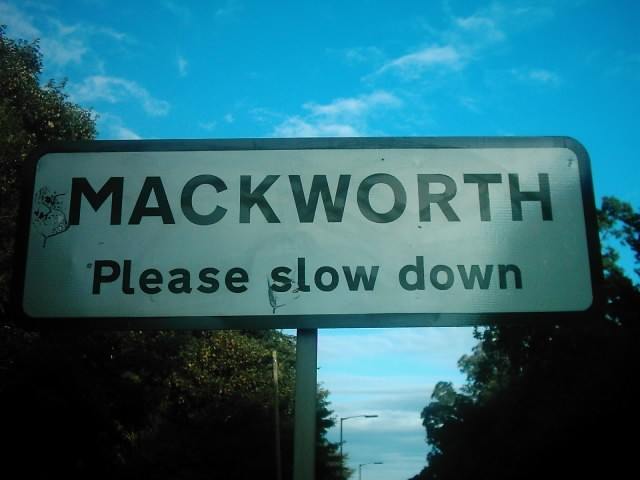
- Road sign approaching Mackworth on the A52

- Location within Derbyshire
- Population: 14,180 (2011 Census)
- OS grid reference: SK323368
- Unitary authority: Derby
- Ceremonial county: Derbyshire
- Region: East Midlands
- Country: England
- Sovereign state: United Kingdom
- Post town: DERBY
- Postcode district: DE22
- Dialling code: 01332
- Police: Derbyshire
- Fire: Derbyshire
- Ambulance: East Midlands
- UK Parliament: Derby North

Mackworth is a suburb of the city of Derby, England. It is located to the northwest of the city, near Markeaton Park and the suburb of Mickleover, and forms part of the Mackworth & New Zealand ward. It is also known as Mackworth Estate, to distinguish it from the nearby village of Mackworth.

== History ==
=== Development ===
The Mackworth Estate was built to meet the increasing demand for council housing in Derby. Construction began in May 1950, with the private company George Wimpey & Company initially handling the work. The first homes on Enfield Road were finished and occupied by 1951. The estate's main shopping centre on Prince Charles Avenue opened on 23 April 1959.

The estate was home to Mackworth Secondary School (a mixed school) and Derby Parkfields Cedars School (for girls), which merged in 1975 to become Parkfields School. In 1989, Parkfields School combined with Mickleover School to form the Murray Park School in Mickleover. The Mackworth school site was later repurposed and became Mackworth College, which eventually became Derby College. After the school closed, the site was redeveloped for new housing in the 2010s.

=== Housing ===
A significant number of homes on the estate are now owner-occupied, though a significant amount of social housing remains. The area has low housing density and plenty of green space. There are also small bungalows, originally designed for older individuals.

Greenwich Gardens, managed by Sanctuary Supported Living, provides apartments and communal facilities for over 55s. The extra care facility was built on the grounds of the Lois Ellis Home for the Blind after its closure.

=== Amenities ===
Amenities and facilities for local residents include shops, dentist, doctors, churches etc. A branch of the city library opened in late March 2010.

=== Road naming and design ===
During development in the 1950s, most of the roads in Mackworth were named after locations in London, with the exception of the main road, Prince Charles Avenue. Examples include Knightsbridge, Mayfair Crescent, Wembley Gardens, Bayswater Close, Mornington Crescent, and Sevenoaks Avenue.

The estate was designed with curved streets to prevent people from using the roads as shortcuts or 'rat runs'.

== Demographics ==
The 2021 Census reported a population of 15,498 for the Mackworth & New Zealand Ward, showing a 9.29% increase from 14,180 recorded in the 2011 Census.

== Landmarks ==
Mackworth's most prominent landmark is a large water tower, owned by Severn Trent, which is visible from much of the estate.

== Education ==
Mackworth is home to two primary schools and one independent school: Reigate Park Primary Academy on Reigate Drive, Brackensdale Spencer Academy on Walthamstow Drive, and Maple View School on Prince Charles Avenue.

== Community facilities ==
Mackworth features three community spaces and shared common rooms.

- Streatham Road managed by Derby Homes
- Mackworth Youth and Community Centre managed by Derby City Council
- Mackworth Estate Community Hall managed by Mackworth Estate Community Association

== Places of worship ==
- St. Francis Mackworth on Prince Charles Avenue
- Christ the King on Prince Charles Avenue
- Mackworth United Reformed Church on Enfield Road

== Transport ==
=== Bus routes ===
Mackworth bus services are operated by Arriva, and Notts & Derby.

- Arriva: 8 - Derby to Mackworth to Derby
- Notts & Derby: Link 2 - Royal Derby Hospital - Mackworth - Royal Derby Hospital

== Government ==
Mackworth and New Zealand is one of the eighteen wards in Derby, electing three councillors to Derby City Council. The ward is represented by two councillors from the Labour and Co-operative Party and one from the Conservative Party. It is also part of the Derby North constituency in the UK Parliament, which has been represented in the House of Commons by Catherine Atkinson from the Labour Party since 2024.

== See also ==
- Listed buildings in Derby (Mackworth Ward)
- St Barnabas' Church, Mackworth, Derby
