= Rapid Electronics =

UK distributor of electronic components and educational products

Rapid Electronics Ltd
- Type: Limited
- Industry: Electronics
- Founded: 1979
- Founder: Mike Lee, Chris Stevenson
- Headquarters: Colchester, Essex, UK
- Products: Electronic components, cables & connectors, electrical & educational products
- Number of employees: 150
- Website: www.rapidonline.com

Rapid Electronics is a UK distributor of electronic components and educational products, and supporter of science, engineering and educational initiatives, based in Colchester, Essex.

== History ==
Rapid Electronics was established by Mike Lee and Chris Stevenson in 1979. The company at this time was based in a converted barn above a garage at Aylesford, Kent and held stock of around 200 products. Rapid started by advertising in the retail electronics press to generate sales and a small single sheet catalogue was mailed to customers.

From 1981 the focus was developing sales into electronics departments at universities and colleges and this strategy was successful over the next 10 years. Due to expansion the company moved to Boxted in Essex in 1983 and continued to grow. Increasing sales led to a number of further moves to larger premises in the Colchester area, culminating in the building of the current 18,000sq.ft premises in Severalls Lane, Colchester.

In late 2012 the company became part of the German-owned Conrad Electronic and by 2014 Rapid had increased its stock-holding to over 100,000 products. Employing around 150 people, the company is currently located in premises close to the A12 and the Colchester Community Stadium.

== Products ==
The company's core products are electrical components such as resistors, capacitors and LEDs.

== Customers ==
Among the company's customers are electrical contractors, design engineers and assembly manufacturers, users of open source programming hardware such as Arduino and Raspberry Pi, makers of audio equipment, amateur radio and model railway enthusiasts..

Rapid Electronics is also a supplier to primary schools, secondary schools and further education institutions in the UK, specialising in equipment for the science, electronics and technology areas of the National Curriculum.

== Educational initiatives ==
From 2004 to 2013 Rapid Electronics partnered Toyota Manufacturing UK developing and co-ordinating the Toyota Technology Challenge, latterly known as the Toyota STEM Challenge. Pupils designed, built and raced environmentally friendly vehicles using solar power or PIC microcontroller technology. Rapid helps co-ordinate the UK Championships for the VEX Robotics Design System, an educational robotics platform, alongside other partners such as National Grid plc and Teach Design. The company has supported many educational projects, initiatives and competitions, including Near Space school projects, the Jaguar Maths in Motion Challenge, the Suffolk Creative Computing Club, the Formula Gravity racing project and individual schools in robotics and science themed competitions. Rapid also provides resources and technical support to the Young Engineers organisation, which runs a network of engineering challenges and clubs across the UK.
