= Listed buildings in Burnaston =

Burnaston is a civil parish in the South Derbyshire district of Derbyshire, England. The parish contains six listed buildings that are recorded in the National Heritage List for England. All the listed buildings are designated at Grade II, the lowest of the three grades, which is applied to "buildings of national importance and special interest". In the parish is Pastures Hospital, and two buildings associated with it are listed, a chapel and a conservatory. Otherwise, the parish is rural, the only significant settlement being the village of Burnaston. The other listed buildings are a house, farmhouses and farm buildings.

== Buildings ==
| Name and location | Photograph | Date | Notes |
|---|---|---|---|
| Walnut Farmhouse and outbuilding 52.88812°N 1.57131°W | — | 17th century | The oldest part is the outbuilding, with the house dated 1730, and a wing added in the 18th century. The house is in red brick with sill bands, a moulded stone cornice, a parapet, and a tile roof with coped gables. The house has three storeys, a double depth plan, three bays, a two-storey two-bay wing to the right, and a lean-to at the rear. On the front of the main block is a round-headed porch with latticed sides, and a doorway with a moulded surround. The windows are sashes, those in the top floor and in the wing with segmental heads. Attached to the left of the house is the outbuilding, which is timber framed with brick infill. |
| Newhouse Farmhouse and barns 52.90189°N 1.55474°W | | Late 17th century | The farmhouse has been extended, and barns have been added, resulting in a U-shaped plan. They are in brick, the farmhouse is stuccoed, and the roofs are slated. The farmhouse has three storeys and three bays, and there are two two-storey extensions. On the front is a gabled porch and windows, most of which are casements. To the left of the farmhouse is the former service wing, and to the right is a covered carriageway. |
| The Homestead; 52.88762°N 1.57074°W | | Late 17th century | A timber framed house on a stone plinth, with painted brick infill, and a tile roof. There are two storeys and two bays, an extension with a single-storey and an attic, and lean-tos at the rear. The porch has a bracketed roof, and the windows are casements. |
| Range of farm buildings, Walnut Farm; 52.88797°N 1.57182°W | — | 1840 | The farm buildings to the west of the farmhouse consist of stables with a loft above, and cowhouses. They are in red brick with an eaves band and tile roofs. The stables have two storeys and three bays, and contain segmental-headed windows, two basket-arched doorways, and external steps leading to an upper floor doorway with the date in brickwork above. The cowhouse contains two basket-arched doorways, three semicircular windows, and a large inserted window. |
| Church, Pastures Hospital; 52.89492°N 1.55773°W | | c. 1870 | The church, which has been converted for residential use, is in sandstone with slate roofs. It consists of a nave, north and south transepts, a chancel, a north vestry and a northwest steeple. The steeple has a tower with two stages, a cornice with ball flower decoration, and a broach spire. |
| Winter Garden, Pastures Hospital; 52.89469°N 1.55786°W | — | Late 19th century | A conservatory with a brick base and a superstructure of timber and cast iron. It has sides of ten and four bays, and a basement. The hipped roof is fully glazed, with a hipped clerestory and finials. |
