= Derby Catacombs =

Coordinates: 52.9225°N 1.4764°W

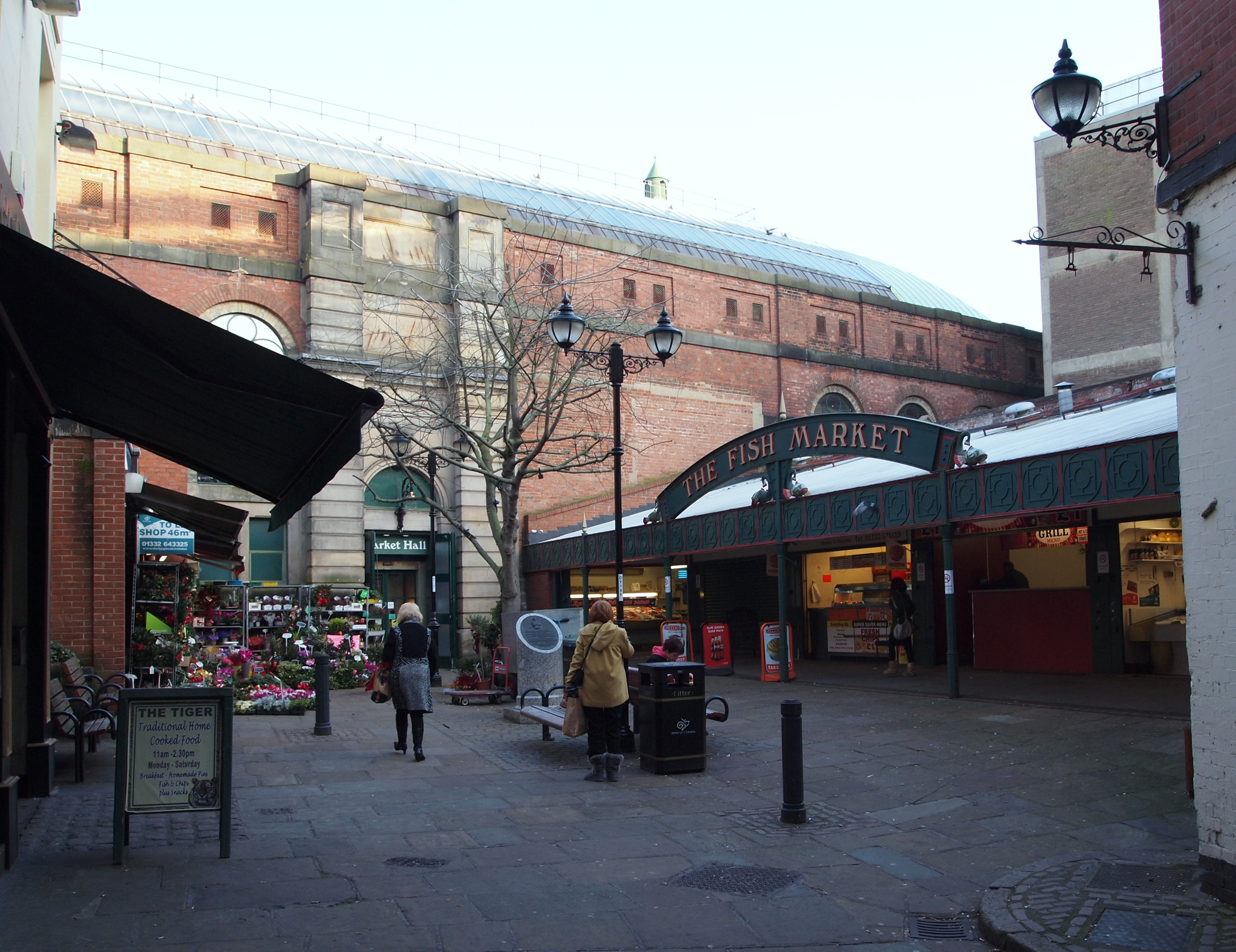
Lock-Up Yard, showing the Tiger pub (left)

The Derby Catacombs (also referred to as the Guildhall Catacombs) are a series of tunnels running beneath the city of Derby, most notably beneath the Marketplace and Derby Guildhall. Access to the tunnels is available via a back room of the nearby Tiger pub.

During the Victorian era, the tunnels were used to ferry prisoners between the police station at "Lock-Up Yard" and the Courts of Assizes, held at the Guildhall.
