= Listed buildings in Derby (Mackworth Ward) =

Mackworth is an electoral ward in the city of Derby, England. The ward contains 23 listed buildings that are recorded in the National Heritage List for England. All the listed buildings are designated at Grade II, the lowest of the three grades, which is applied to "buildings of national importance and special interest". The ward is to the northwest of the centre of the city and is almost entirely residential. Most of the listed buildings are houses, and the others consist of the entrance screen to a former gaol, a former toll house, a public house, two schools, one active and the other used for different purposes, a set of railings, and former almshouses.

== Buildings ==
Name and location	Photograph	Date	Notes
Old Gaol; 52.92362°N 1.49133°W		1823–27	The entrance screen to the prison was designed by Francis Goodwin, and the end towers were added in 1832. It is in stone, and in the centre is an entrance flanked by massive Tuscan columns, and with a triglyph frieze, and a modillion cornice. The wings have four bays divided by pilasters, and they contain narrow windows. At the top is a small parapet and a central stepped pediment.
24 and 26 Ashbourne Road; 52.92569°N 1.49187°W		Early 19th century	Two houses combined into one, it is stuccoed, on a plinth, with projecting eaves and a hipped slate roof. There are two storeys, three bays, and a recessed wing on the left. In the centre of the main block is a doorway with pilasters and a pediment, and in the recessed bay is a doorway with a cornice hood on brackets. The windows are sashes.
161 Ashbourne Road; 52.92772°N 1.50013°W		Early 19th century	A former toll house, it is rendered, with a sill band and a slate roof. There are two storeys, and two bays with splayed sides. In the centre is a large segmental recess containing a doorway. On the sides of the splay are blocked windows, and the upper floor contains two sash windows.
193 and 195 Ashbourne Road; 52.92807°N 1.50132°W	—	Early 19th century	A pair of red brick houses with dog-tooth eaves and a slate roof. There are three storeys and two bays. The doorways have cambered heads, and the windows are horizontally-sliding sashes, those in the middle floor with cambered heads.
12 Vernon Street; 52.92396°N 1.49056°W		1831	A stuccoed house on a plinth, with end pilasters decorated with Greek key ornament, a sill band, a cornice, bold lined eaves, and a hipped slate roof. There are two storeys and three bays, the middle bay projecting slightly. In the centre is a cast iron trellis porch with an upswept lead roof, and the windows are sashes.
1–2 Vernon Street; 52.92493°N 1.48994°W		1834	A pair of mirror-image stuccoed houses with central and end pilasters, a sill band, bold lined eaves, and a hipped slate roof. There are two storeys and each house has three bays. In the centre of each house is a porch with Tuscan columns, and a doorway with a rectangular fanlight. Outside these are canted bay windows, and the other windows are sashes in moulded architraves.
3 and 3A Vernon Street; 52.92474°N 1.49016°W		1834	A detached stuccoed house with end pilasters, a sill band, bold lined eaves, and a hipped slate roof. There are two storeys and three bays, the middle bay projecting slightly. In the centre is a porch with pilasters and a doorway with a rectangular fanlight, and the windows are sashes.
4 Vernon Street; 52.92466°N 1.49034°W		1834	A detached stuccoed house with floor bands, bold lined eaves, and a hipped slate roof. There are two storeys and two bays. The windows are sashes, those in the ground floor with shallow pediments. On the left return is a porch with pilasters, imposts, a plain doorway on the front, and a round-arched window on the side.
83–84 Friar Gate; 52.92440°N 1.48754°W		Early to mid 19th century	A pair of stuccoed houses with a bold eaves cornice and a slate roof. There are three storeys and five bays. The two doorways have round-arched heads, moulded surrounds, and traceried fanlights, and the windows are sashes.
Greyhound Inn; 52.92471°N 1.48880°W		Early to mid 19th century	The public house, probably with an earlier core, is in painted brick with modillion eaves. There are two storeys and four bays. On the front are two doorways, one with a rectangular fanlight, and the windows are casements.
15 South Street; 52.92347°N 1.49012°W		c. 1840	A red brick house on a plinth, with bold lined eaves, and a hipped slate roof. There are two storeys, three bays, a single-bay recessed wing on the left, and a projecting gabled wing. In the centre of the main block is a cast iron trellis porch with an upswept lead roof, and a doorway with a rectangular fanlight, The windows are sashes with channelled wedge lintels.
16 South Street; 52.92380°N 1.49075°W		c. 1840	A red brick house on a corner site, on a plinth, stuccoed on the left return, with bold lined eaves, and a hipped slate roof. There are two storeys, four bays on the front and one on the left return. The doorway has pilasters, a tripartite fanlight and a cornice, and the windows are sashes with rusticated wedge lintels.
6 Vernon Street; 52.92444°N 1.49058°W		c. 1840	A detached stuccoed house with end pilasters, a floor band, a cornice, bold lined eaves, and a hipped slate roof. There are two storeys, three bays, and a recessed single-bay single-storey extension on the left. In the centre is a doorway with pilasters and a rectangular fanlight, to the right is a canted bay window, and the other windows are sashes in moulded architraves.
13 Vernon Street; 52.92408°N 1.49041°W		c. 1840	A house on a corner site in red brick, stuccoed on the front, on a plinth, with end pilasters decorated with Greek key ornament, a sill band, a cornice, bold lined eaves, and a hipped slate roof. There are two storeys and three bays, the middle bay projecting slightly. In the centre is a cast iron trellis porch with an upswept lead roof, and a doorway with a rectangular fanlight, and the windows are sashes.
29 York Street; 52.92417°N 1.49018°W		c. 1840	A stuccoed house on a plinth, with bold lined eaves, and a hipped slate roof. There are two storeys and an attic, and four bays. The doorway has a rectangular fanlight and a cornice on brackets, and the windows are sashes.
73 Friar Gate; 52.92478°N 1.48950°W		1841	Originally the Diocesan School, it was designed by H. I. Stevens and later used for other purposes. The building is in red brick with stone dressings, bands, an eaves cornice and a parapet. The building is on a corner site, and has two storeys, three bays on Friar Gate, five on Vernon Street, and an angled bay on the corner. The angled bay has a gable with an obelisk finial, and contains an oriel window, over which is a clock face in the gable. On the Friar Gate front is a doorway with a moulded surround, a pointed arched head and a hood mould. The windows are mullioned and transomed with hood moulds.
14–18 Vernon Street; 52.92436°N 1.49006°W		Mid 19th century	A terrace of five stuccoed houses with floor and sill bands, and a slate roof, hipped on the left. Nos. 14 and 15 have two bays each and doorways with flat heads and rectangular fanlights. No. 16 has two bays and a round-arched doorway with a semicircular fanlight. No. 17 is gabled, and contains a two-light window in the upper floor and a tripartite window in the ground floor, and No. 18 has a square bay window. The windows are sashes, those in Nos. 16–18 in moulded architraves.
5 Vernon Street; 52.92451°N 1.49047°W		1850–51	A detached roughcast house with end pilasters, a floor band, a shallow cornice, bold lined eaves, and hipped slate roofs. There are two storeys, three bays, and a recessed single-bay extension on the right. In the centre is a doorway with pilasters and a rectangular fanlight and to the right is a tripartite window, together forming a bay window. Most of the other windows are sashes in moulded architraves, and in the angle between the main part and the extension is an external stairway leading to an upper doorway.
7–10 Vernon Street; 52.92426°N 1.49084°W		1850–51	A terrace of four stuccoed houses on a plinth, with pilasters at the ends and between the houses, a sill band, bold lined eaves, and a hipped slate roof. There are two storeys and each house has three bays. In the centre is a square porch with Tuscan columns, a frieze and a cornice, the outer houses have doorways with pilasters, a frieze and a cornice, and the windows are sashes.
11 Vernon Street; 52.92413°N 1.49095°W		1850–51	A detached stuccoed house on a plinth, with end pilasters, a floor band, bold lined eaves, and a hipped slate roof. There are two storeys and three bays, the middle bay projecting slightly. In the centre is a square porch with Tuscan columns, and a doorway with a rectangular fanlight. The windows are sashes in moulded architraves, those in the ground floor with cornices.
Railings north of the Railway Orphanage; 52.92605°N 1.49429°W		Late 19th century	The railings by the entrance are elaborate and in cast iron.
Front Block, dining hall and wall, Ashgate Junior School; 52.92622°N 1.49563°W		1879	The school is in red brick with dressings in blue brick, moulded brick and stone, and has Welsh slate roofs with coped gables. There are two storeys, a main block with three wide bays, the middle bay gabled, a recessed two-bay wing to the left, a linking bay and a gabled bay to the right, and to the right of that is a three-story three stage tower. The boundary is enclosed by a red brick wall with railings and three cast iron gates.
Large's Hospital; 52.92448°N 1.48790°W		1880	A range of almshouses, later used for other purposes, in red brick with stone dressings, and a tile roof with gables, bargeboards and finials. There are two storeys and attics, and eight bays, the outer bays projecting and gabled. On the front are five canted bay windows, and four doorways with rectangular fanlights. The windows are mullioned, and on the front is an inscribed stone tablet.
