= Pastures Hospital =

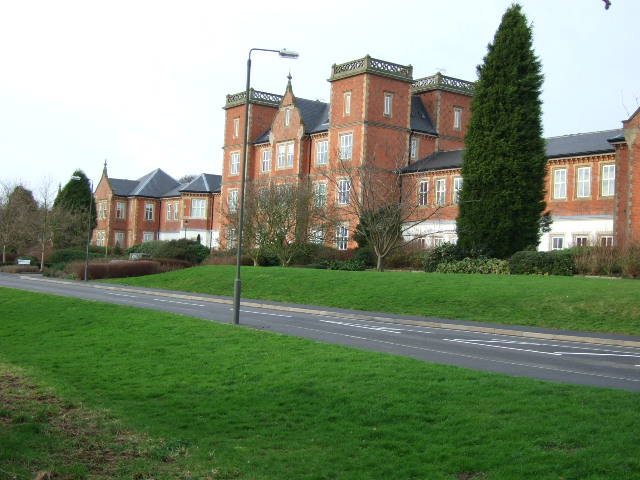
- Pastures Hospital

- Shown in Derbyshire

Geography
- Location: Mickleover, England
- Coordinates: 52.8945°N 1.5598°W

Organisation
- Care system: NHS
- Type: Specialist

Services
- Speciality: Mental health

History
- Founded: 1851
- Closed: 1994

Links
- Lists: Hospitals in England

Pastures Hospital was a mental health facility at Mickleover in Derbyshire, England. The church is a Grade II listed building.

== History ==
The hospital, which was designed by Henry Duesbury in the Jacobean style using a corridor layout, opened in August 1851. The chapel was completed in 1869 and additional wards were created in 1895 and in 1905. It became Derbyshire County Mental Hospital in 1918 and joined the National Health Service as Pastures Hospital in 1948.

After the introduction of Care in the Community in the early 1980s, the hospital went into a period of decline and closed in 1994. The main administration block was subsequently converted into apartments as Duesbury Court.

== See also ==
- Listed buildings in Burnaston
