= Murray Park School =

Murray Park Community School

Location
- Murray Road, Mickleover; Derby, Derbyshire, DE3 9LL; England; 52°55′06″N 1°31′50″W

Information
- Type: Foundation school
- Local authority: Derby
- Department for Education URN: 112991 Tables
- Ofsted: Reports
- Head teacher: Nicola Caley
- Gender: Co-educational
- Age: 11 to 16
- Enrolment: 997
- Website: www.murraypark.derby.sch.uk

Murray Park School is a secondary school on Murray Road in Mickleover, Derby, England. It has about 1050 pupils, most of whom live in the Mickleover and Mackworth areas.

== Admissions ==
It does not have a sixth form.

== History ==
Murray Park was the first school in the UK to have skateboarding on the physical education curriculum in 2007.

1st School Rewarding for being No.1 Disliked Secondary School In Whole Of Derbyshire According To the Derbyshire Secondary School Review

== Academic performance ==
2007 result

Results

5+A*-C 55%
5+A*-G 95%
1+A*-G 99%
Ave points 294
(Capped to best 8 results)
