= Derby Airport (England) =

Former airport of the East Midlands, England, United Kingdom (1938–1990)

- IATA: none; ICAO: none

Summary
- Airport type: Defunct
- Owner: Derby Corporation
- Location: Burnaston, Derbyshire, England
- Opened: 1938
- Closed: March 1990
- Coordinates: 52°52′20″N 001°33′48″W

Map
- Location in Derbyshire

Derby Airport (also known as Derby Municipal Airport, Burnaston Airport and during the Second World War as RAF Burnaston) was an airport located at Burnaston, Derbyshire, England. Opened in 1938 as the commercial airport serving Derby, it was superseded by East Midlands Airport in the 1960s but continued as an airfield until the spring of 1990.

The site is now occupied by a Toyota car factory, which started operations in December 1992.

== History ==
The airport was created at the suggestion of Captain Roy Harben DFC, a veteran of the Royal Flying Corps, who persuaded the Air Ministry that a flying school was required. The airport served the nearby town (now city) of Derby and was initially owned by Derby Corporation, which acquired the Burnaston House estate for £21,500 in 1936.

The airport was opened for training flights in 1938, with the official opening performed by the Secretary of State for Air, Kingsley Wood, in June 1939. Plans to develop the airport for commercial flights were interrupted by the Second World War, when Burnaston was used by the Royal Air Force (RAF).

RAF Units;

- No. 3 Basic Flying Training School RAF (1951–53) using Chipmunk T.10s
- No. 16 Elementary Flying Training School RAF
- No. 16 Reserve Flying School RAF
- No. 30 Elementary and Reserve Flying Training School RAF
- No. 30 Elementary Flying Training School RAF
- No. 49 Gliding School RAF

In the post-war era Derby Aviation (later Derby Airways) began operating a number of scheduled services from Derby, the first route being to Jersey in 1953. During this time, Burnaston House served as the airport's terminal building. Commercial flights ceased in the 1960s when services were transferred to the newly opened East Midlands Airport nearby.

The airfield continued to be used by flying clubs until being closed altogether in March 1990 to make way for the construction of the Toyota car plant. Following the closure of the airport, Derby Airfield, a three-runway grass airfield, opened nearby.

== See also ==
- Derby Airfield
- Tatenhill Airfield

== Bibliography ==
- Stitt, Robert M. (March–April 2001). "Midland Memories: The Life and Times of Derby's Burnaston Airport, Part Two". Air Enthusiast (92): 66–76. ISSN 0143-5450.
- Sturtivant, Ray; Hamlin, John (2007). Royal Air Force flying training and support units since 1912. Tonbridge, UK: Air-Britain (Historians). ISBN 978-0851-3036-59.
