= Toyota Manufacturing UK =

Toyota subsidiary in the UK

Toyota Motor Manufacturing (UK) Ltd
- Logo used since 20 July 2020

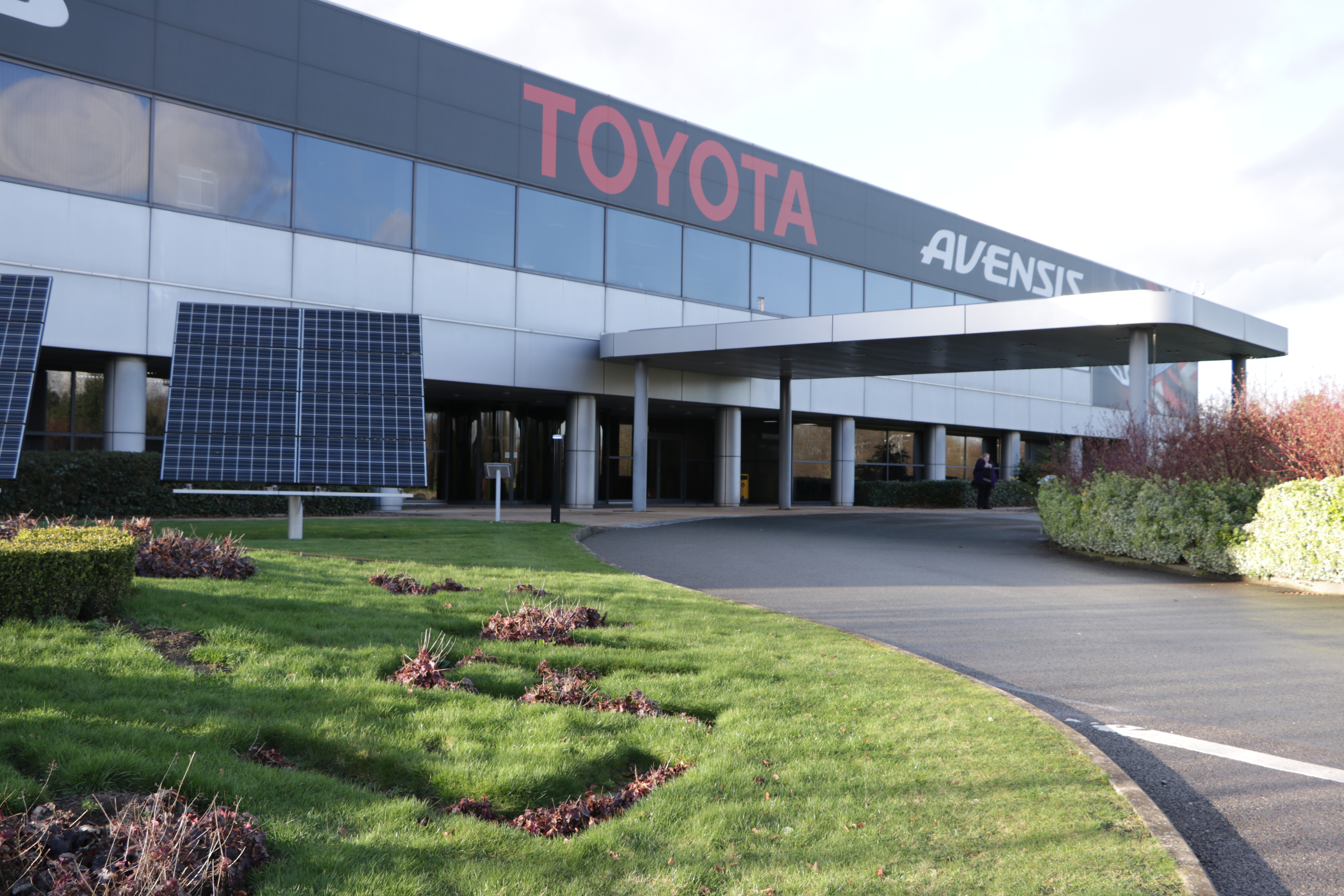
- Main entrance to the Toyota Motor Manufacturing plant, Burnaston, near Derby
- Type: Subsidiary
- Industry: Automotive
- Founded: 1989; 37 years ago
- Headquarters: Burnaston, Derbyshire, England
- Key people: Shigeru Teramoto (Managing Director); Sir Alan Jeffrey Jones (Chairman Emeritus)
- Products: Automobiles
- Owner: Toyota
- Number of employees: 3,800
- Parent: Toyota Europe
- Website: toyotauk.com

Toyota Motor Manufacturing (UK) Ltd is the British manufacturing subsidiary of Toyota. Established in 1989, the main factory is at Burnaston in Derbyshire, with an engine factory located in Deeside, North Wales. Construction of the Burnaston factory began in March 1990 after the demolition of Burnaston House, and took almost three years to complete. The factory was officially opened on 4 June 1993 by Prince Charles, almost six months after vehicle production had begun.

== History ==
The factory's first car, a Carina E, rolled off the production line on 16 December 1992. The first Carina E to be built in the factory is preserved in the British Motor Museum. Another Carina E built at the factory clocked up 560,000 miles by November 2019 after being purchased new twenty-two years earlier.

An engine manufacturing factory was opened in September 1992 in Deeside, North Wales, shortly before vehicle production commenced three months later. The first batch of the second-generation Avensis built at the factory was exported to Japan from Southampton in July 2003, pending the launch of the vehicle in the Far East that autumn.

Gordon Brown, the then Chancellor of the Exchequer, visited Burnaston on 26 February 2007 to celebrate the launch of the Auris in the UK. TMUK used the occasion to announce an investment of £100 million in its factory in Deeside, to build the petrol engine for the Auris in the future. It was announced in July 2009 that the factory would build the hybrid powered Auris, commencing the following year.

It was announced in October 2008 that the factory had won the contract to build the third-generation Avensis. Production of this model generation started the following month, and was launched by the then Secretary of State for Transport, Geoff Hoon MP. In June 2011, it was announced that Avensis cars from the factory would be exported to Japan for the first time in eight years.

Production of the second-generation Auris began at the factory in November 2012, with a ceremony held to mark the occasion.

George Osborne, the then Chancellor of the Exchequer, visited the Burnaston factory on 7 March 2011 to celebrate the launch of the Auris Hybrid in the UK. Burnaston produced 180,425 cars in 2016, 5.1% fewer than the previous year. It was reported in March 2018 that the plant was operating at 50% of its theoretical maximum three-shift capacity.

Production of the diesel engined Auris ended at Burnaston in December 2017 after nearly eleven years. TMUK also confirmed that it ceased production of the Avensis in June 2018 after more than twenty years. Production of the Auris also ended around this time at the factory after eleven years.

Production of the Suzuki Swace at the manufacturing plant was first announced in March 2019 and commenced the following year. Production of new cars were suspended by the factory in March 2020 owing to the ongoing global pandemic, with production resuming two months later in May 2020 with measures undertaken. Production was again suspended in December 2020 amid the then ongoing travel ban in the country.

Toyota denied plans to pull out of the UK in April 2022 after reports suggested the company had threatened to withdraw due to recent UK government plans to speed up the transition to electric vehicles.

== Operations ==
The two factories currently employ more than 3,800 staff. The processes at Burnaston currently include stamping (pressing panels from rolls of steel), welding, painting, plastic mouldings (bumpers and instrument panels/dashboards) and assembly and at Deeside machining, assembly and aluminium casting.

At its fastest speed, one car can come off the end of the production line approximately every sixty seconds. Toyota Manufacturing UK, in partnership with Rapid Electronics, organises the Toyota Technology Challenge, a national UK engineering and technology competition for secondary schools.

== Production ==
=== Current models ===
- Toyota Corolla E210 (2018–present)
- Toyota GR Corolla (2026–present, export only)
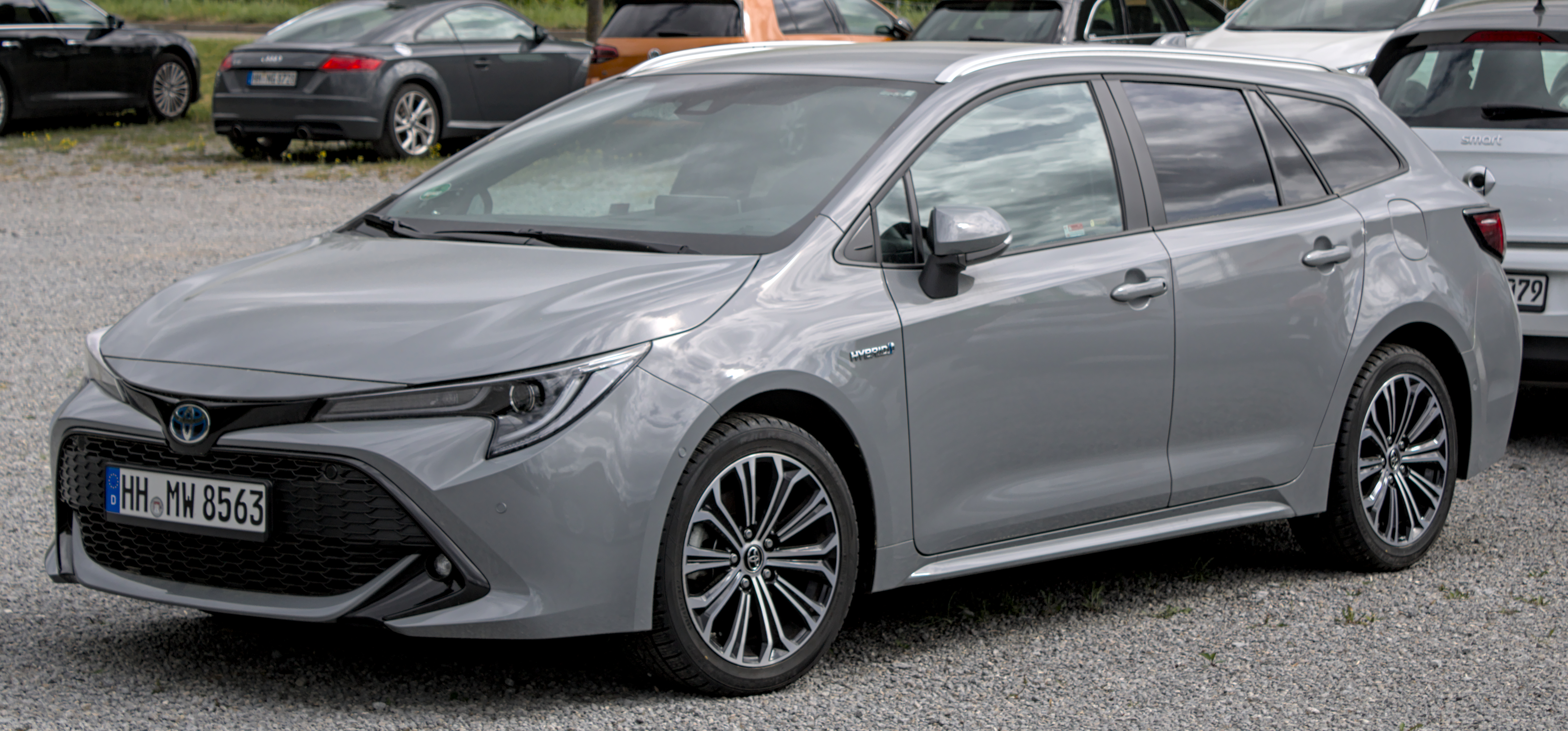
Toyota Corolla (E210)

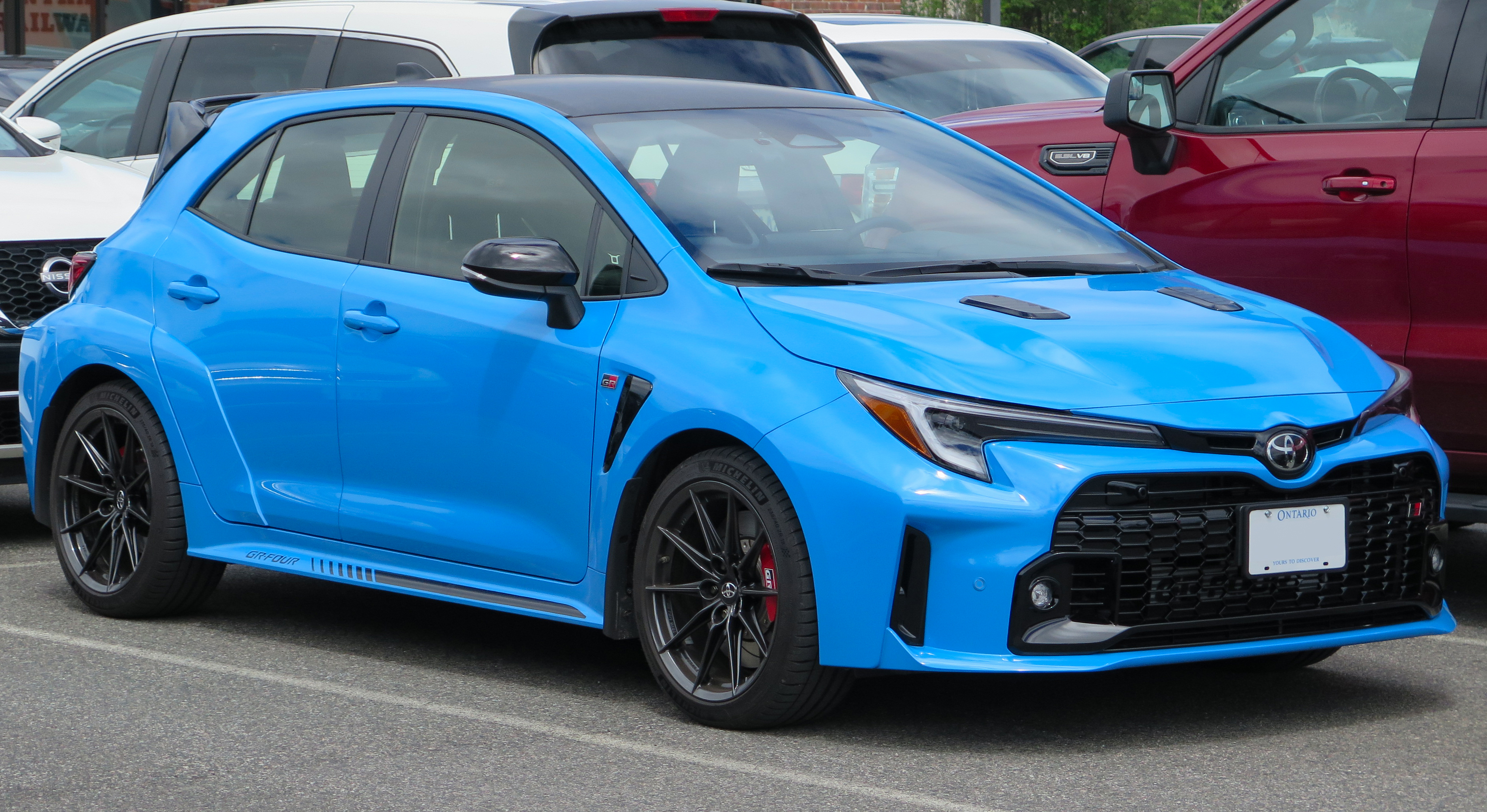
Toyota GR Corolla

=== Former models ===
- Toyota Carina E (1992–1997)
- Toyota Avensis (1997–2018)
- Toyota Corolla (1997–2007)
- Toyota Auris (2006–2018)
- Suzuki Swace (2020–2025)
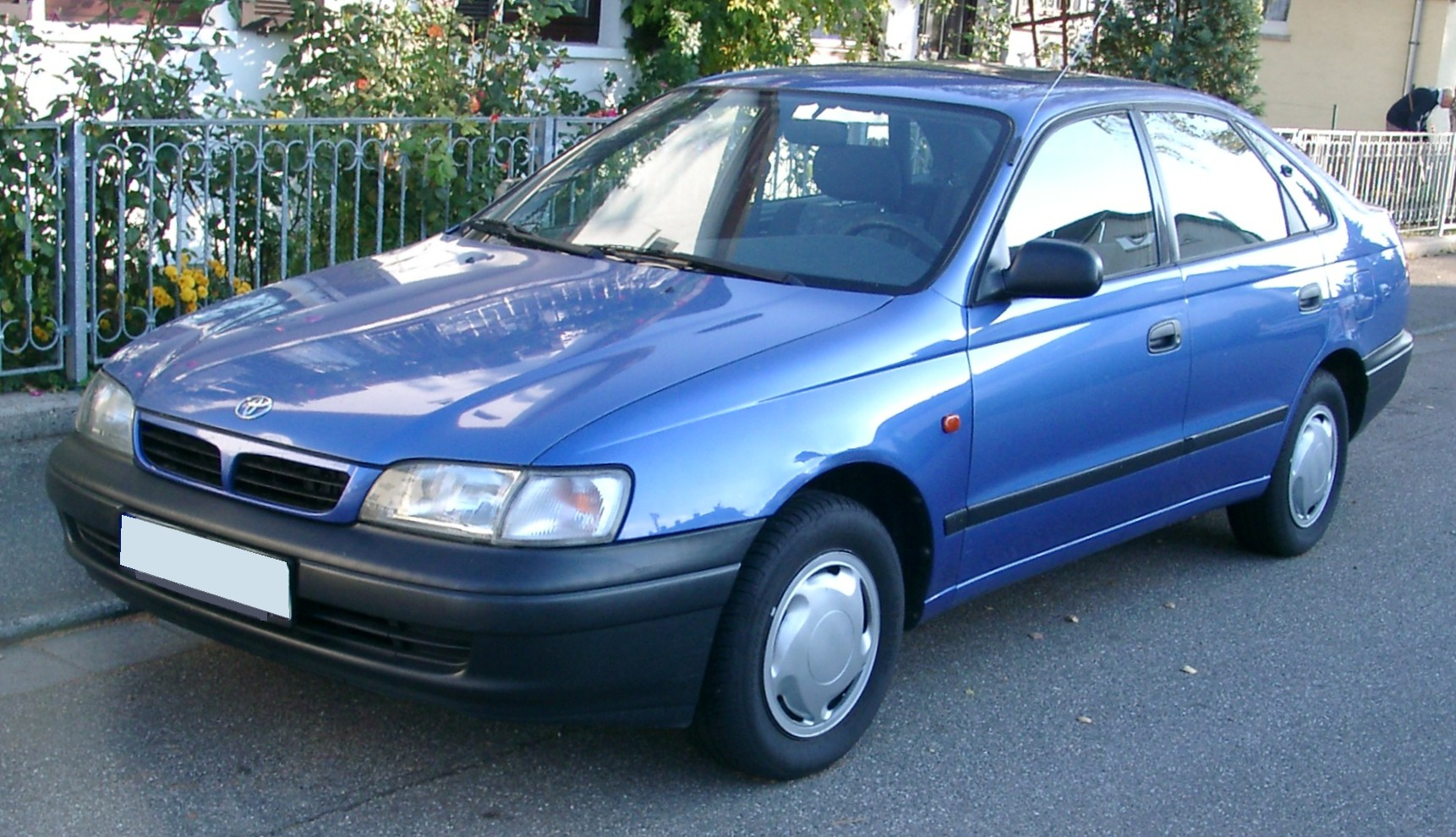
Toyota Carina E (T190)

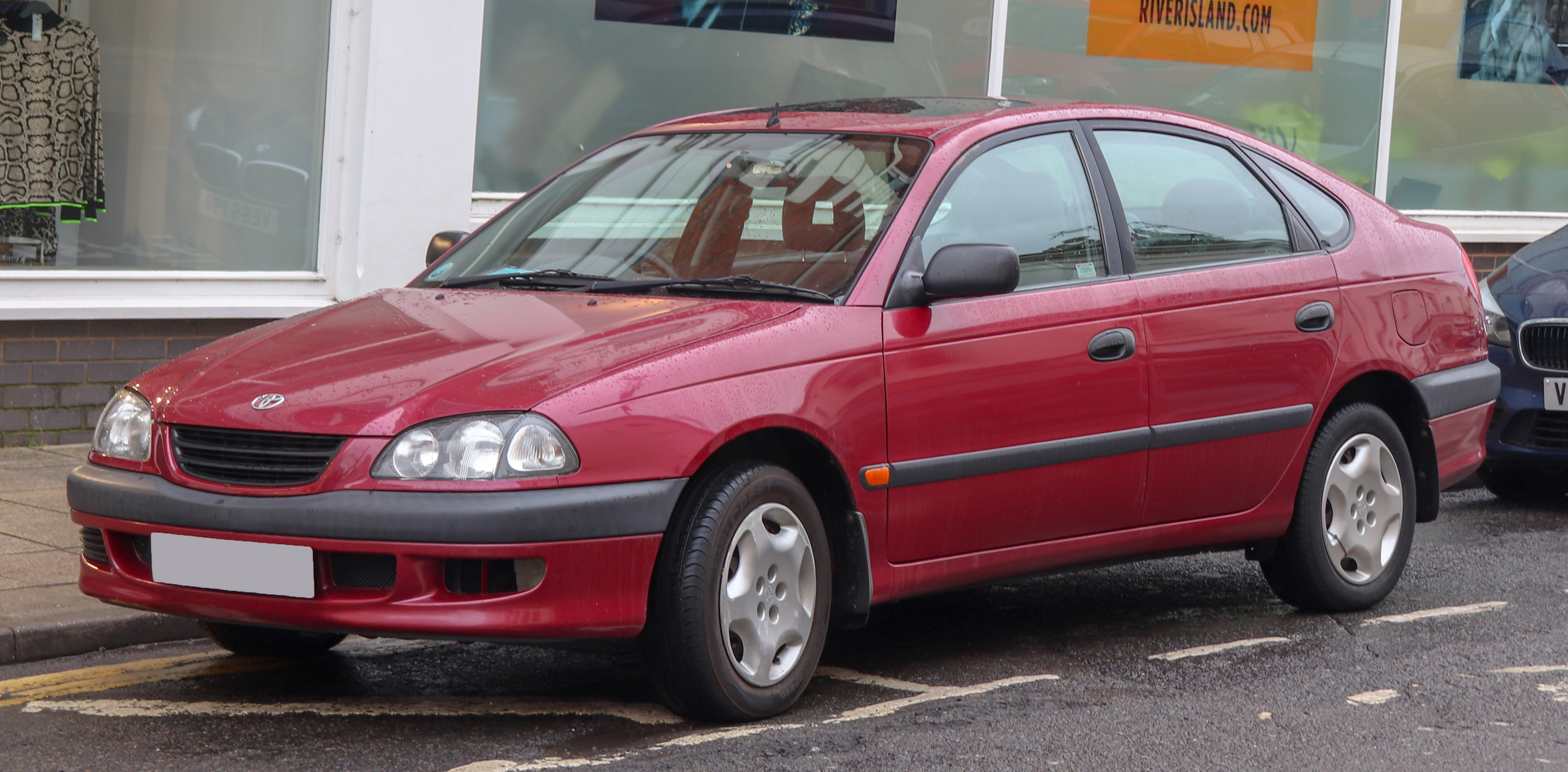
Toyota Avensis (T220)

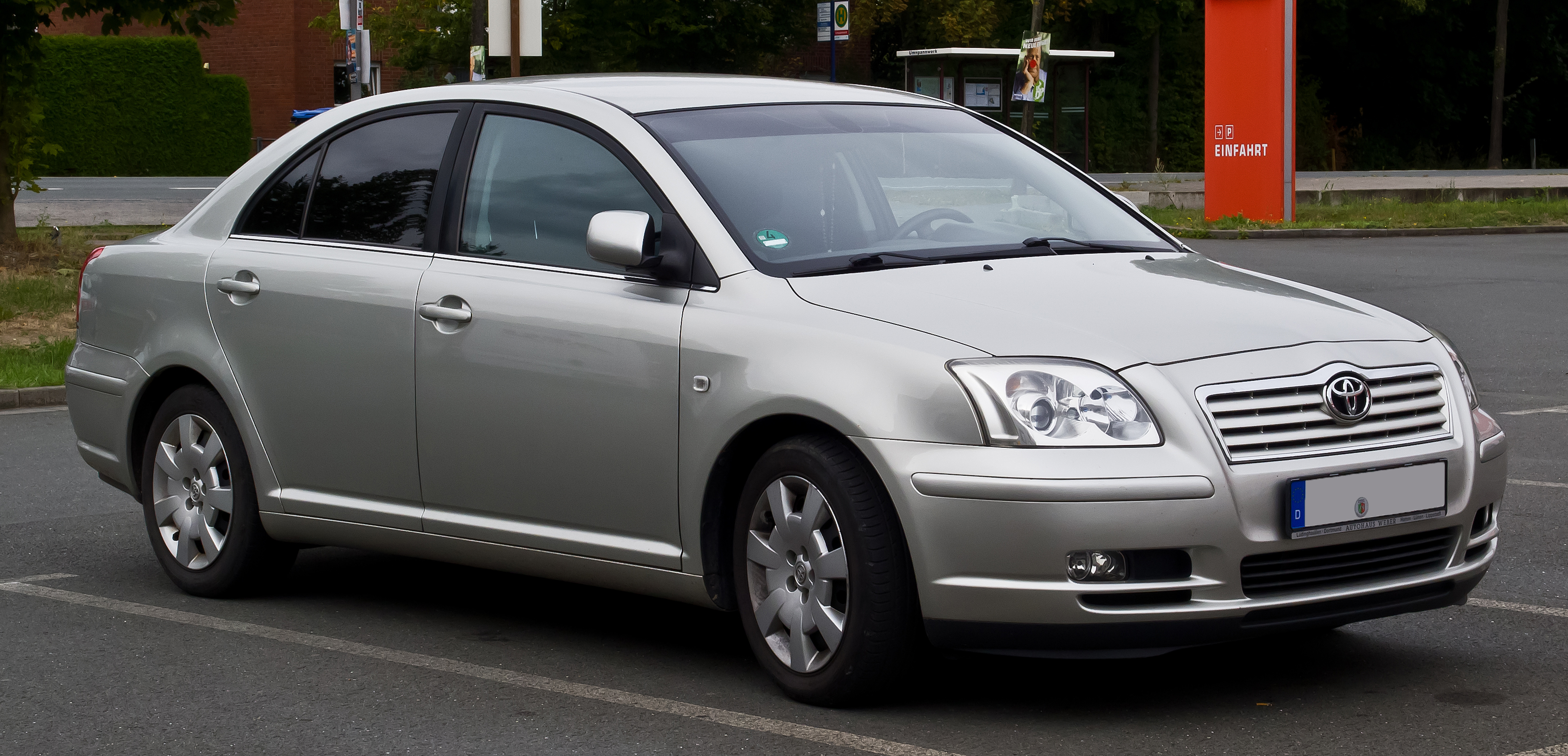
Toyota Avensis (T250)

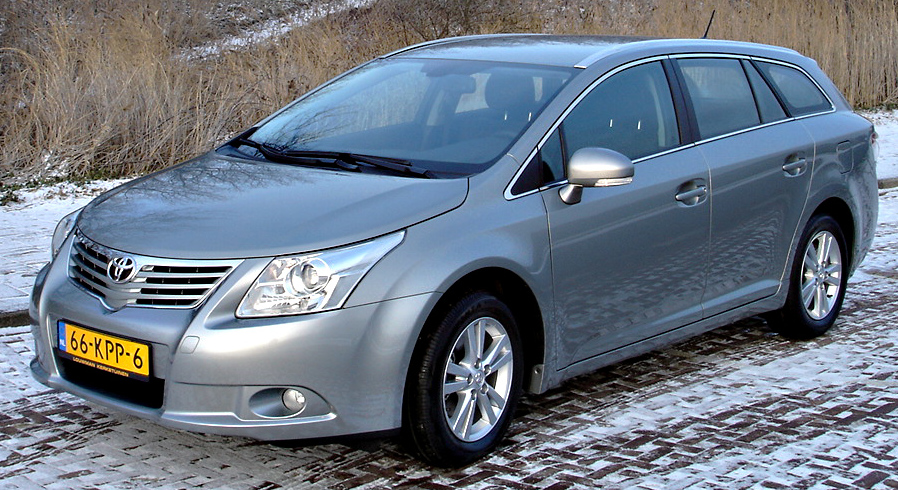
Toyota Avensis (T270)

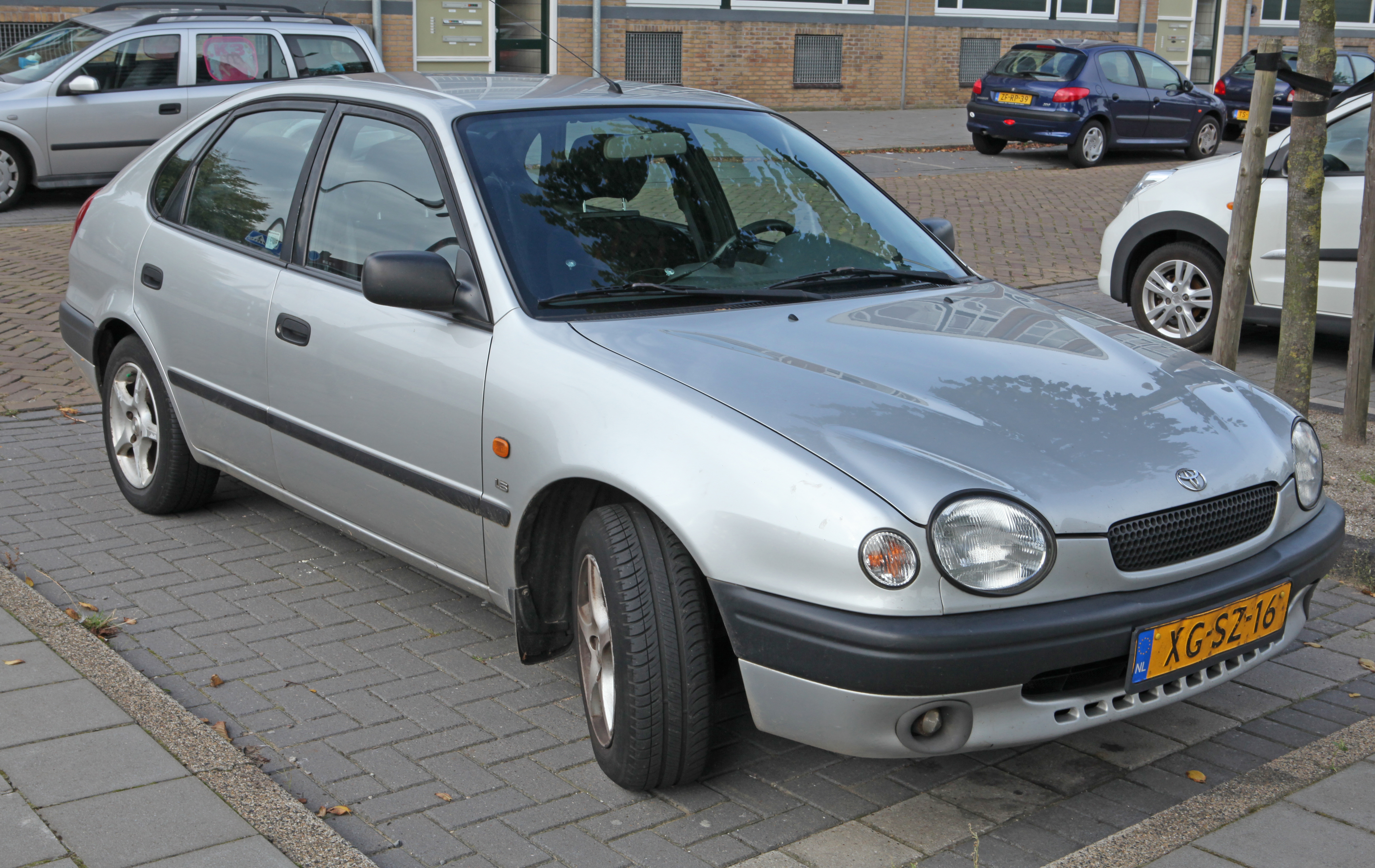
Toyota Corolla (E110)

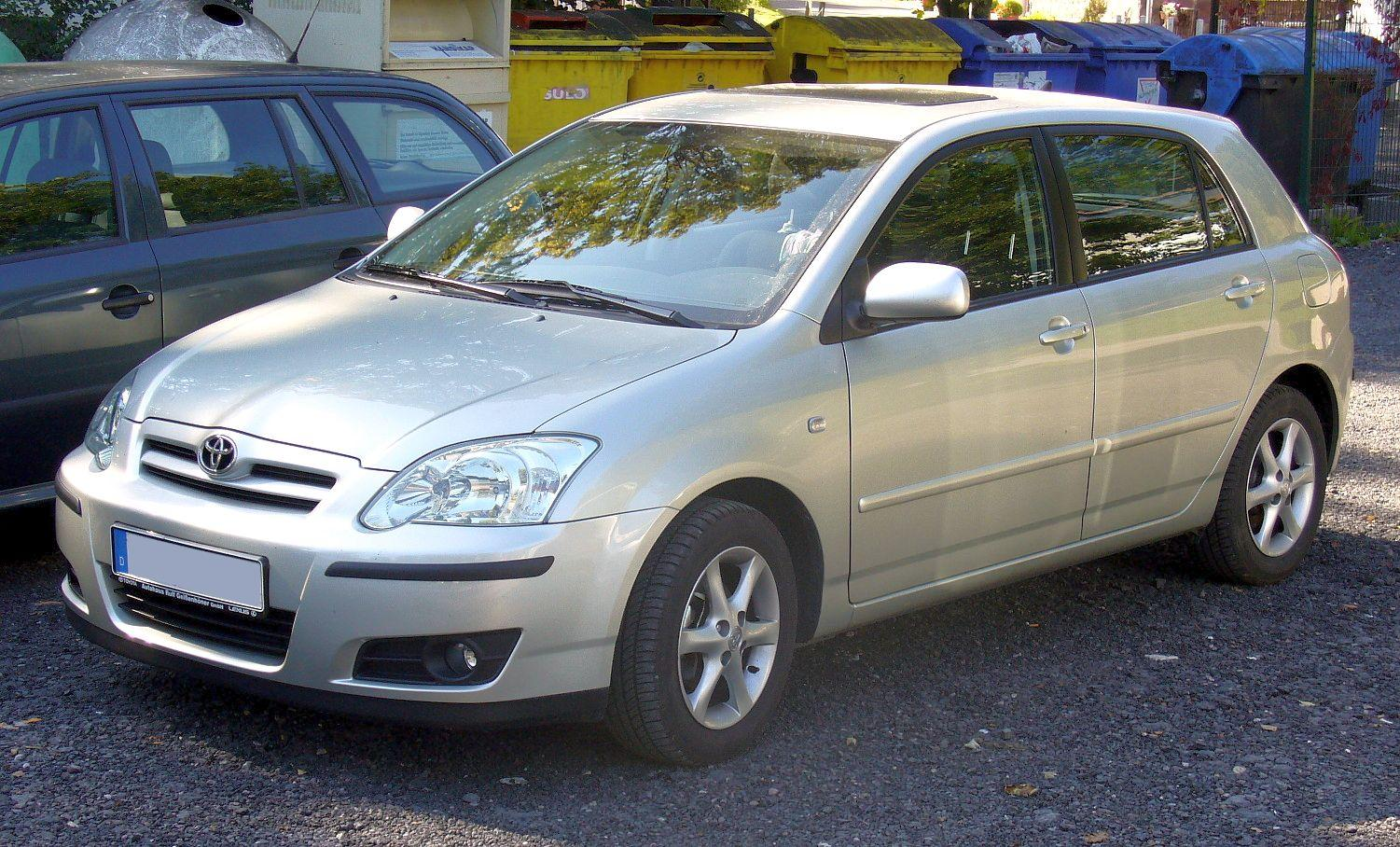
Toyota Corolla (E120)

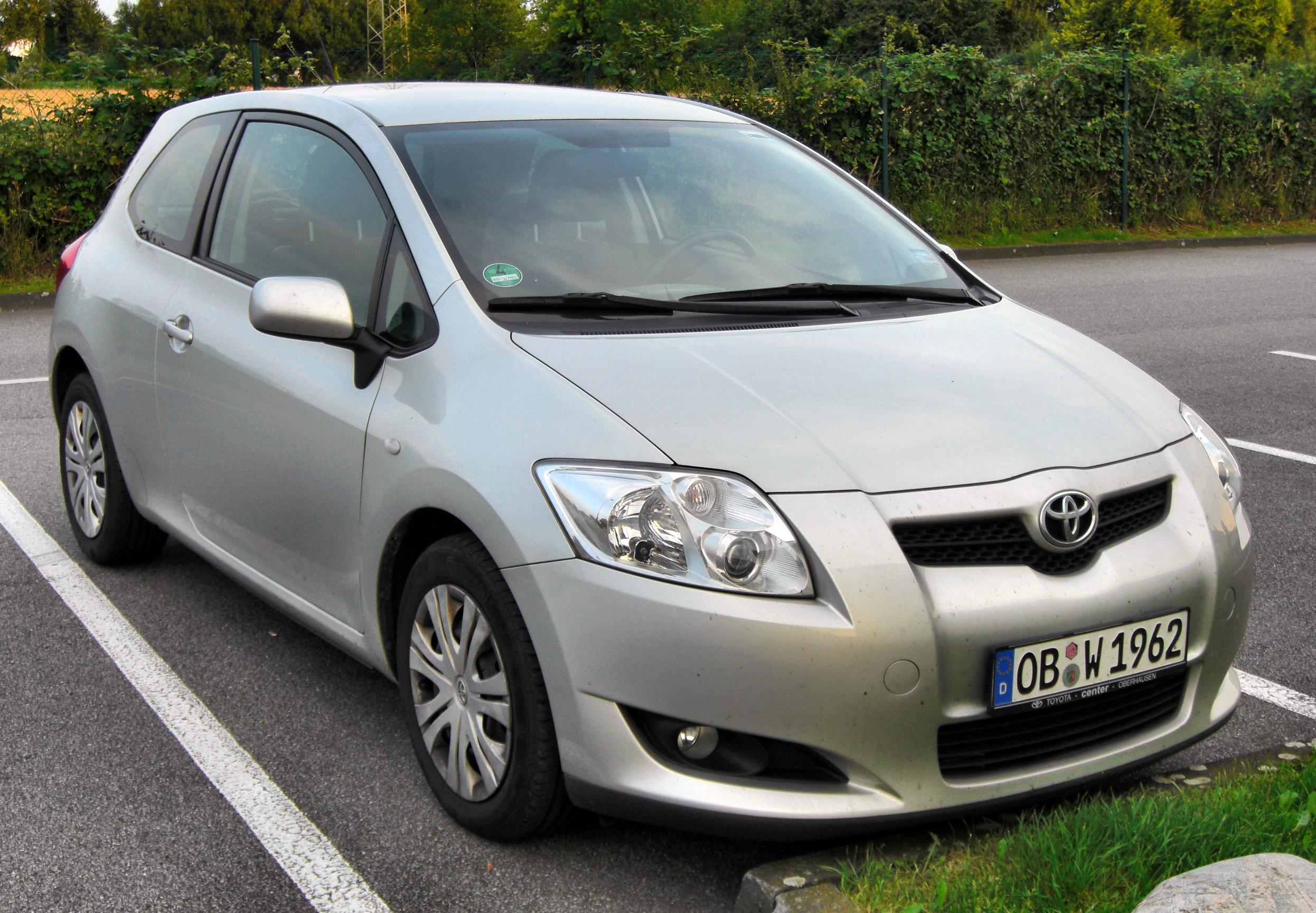
Toyota Auris (E150)

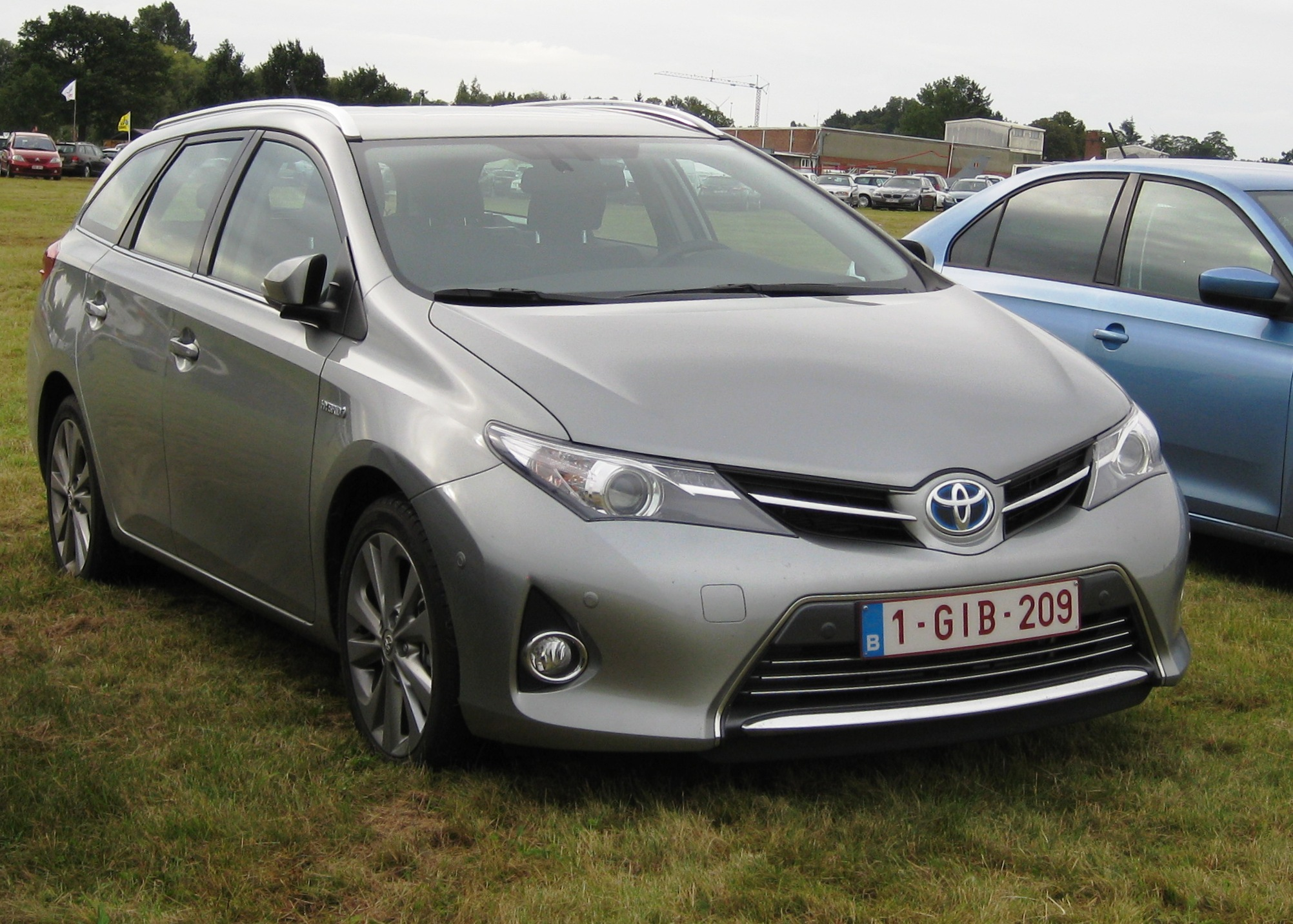
Toyota Auris (E180)

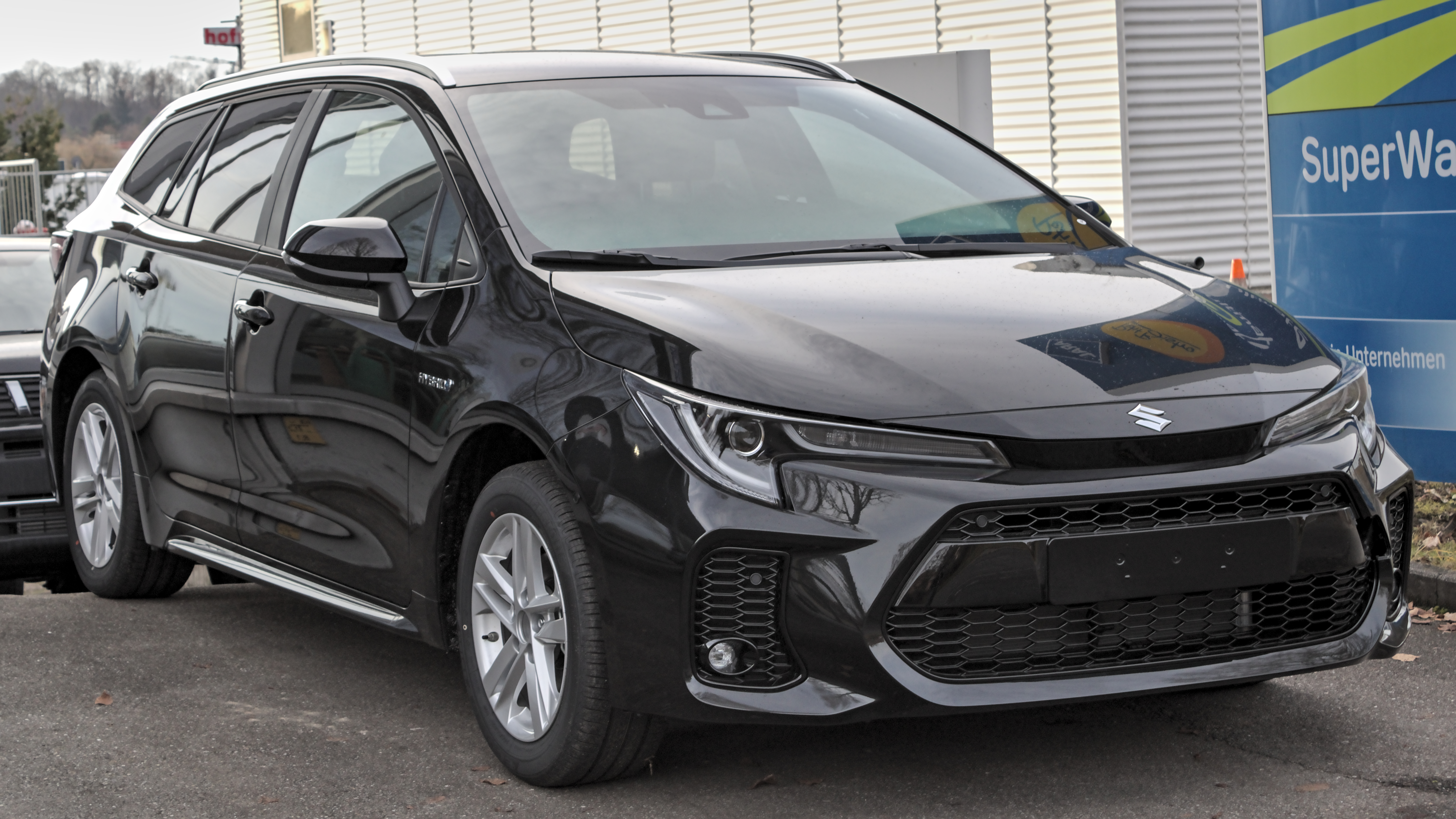
Suzuki Swace (E210)
