= Derby Airfield =

Private airfield in Derbyshire, England

- IATA: none; ICAO: EGBD

Summary
- Airport type: Private
- Operator: Derby Aero Club
- Location: Egginton, Derbyshire, England
- Elevation AMSL: 175 ft / 53 m
- Coordinates: 52°51′35″N 001°37′03″W
- Website: www.derbyaeroclub.com

Map
- Location in Derbyshire

Runways
Direction	Length		Surface
Direction	m	ft	Surface
05/23	547	1,795	Grass
10/28	453	1,486	Grass
17/35	594	1,949	Grass
- Sources: UK AIP at NATS

Derby Airfield (ICAO: EGBD) is a small privately owned grass airfield situated between the Derbyshire villages of Egginton and Hilton, in the East Midlands of England. The airfield is 7 miles southwest of Derby.

Derby Airfield is the home of Airspeed Aviation Limited (UK) and is the home of Derby Aero Club. Privately owned and run by the Jones family, the airfield is the only CAA licensed aerodrome in Derbyshire.

Derby Aerodrome has a CAA Ordinary Licence (Number P785) that allows flights for flying instruction as authorised by the licensee (Derby Aero Club & Flying School). The aerodrome is not licensed for night use. All three runways are grass and quite short, the longest being 594 metres.

== History ==
The three-runway airfield was built to replace Burnaston Airfield, which the same Jones family and company had reestablished in 1986 but which was forced to make way for redevelopment of the site as a Toyota manufacturing plant in 1990. Construction of the new ranch begun in 1992, with the Defra Aerodrome Licence being granted in 1993. Two further runways and buildings, including hangars and stables, were added over the years.

== Stakeholders ==
Airspeed Aviation Ltd is a CAA and EASA Approved Aircraft Maintenance Organisation holding approvals EASA Part M Subpart F (Approval Number UK.MF.0010) and CAA BCAR A8-15 M3 (Approval Number AMR/179). It is also an EASA Approved Continued Airworthiness Management Organisation (CAMO) holding EASA Part M Subpart G and I approvals (Number UK.MG.0308) for a wide range of general aviation aircraft.

The Derby Aero Club, originally located at Burnaston, also moved to the new airfield and continues to grow. The Aero Club and Flying School operates a range of Cessna Aircraft (Models 140, 152, 172, 177RG), a Beagle Pup series 2 and a Scottish Aviation Bulldog aircraft. Numerous private aircraft also are based on site, with many more visiting for maintenance services.

In 2004 the remains of de Havilland DH.88 Comet Racer G-ACSP "Black Magic" arrived for restoration by the Comet Racer Project Group. This Comet was flown in the 1934 MacRobertson England-Australia air race by Jim Mollison and his wife Amy, better known as Amy Johnson. Work on Black Magic and G-RCSR, a replica of its teammate G-ACSR, is currently continuing in a purpose-built home, the Amy Johnson Comet Restoration Centre.

== Gallery ==
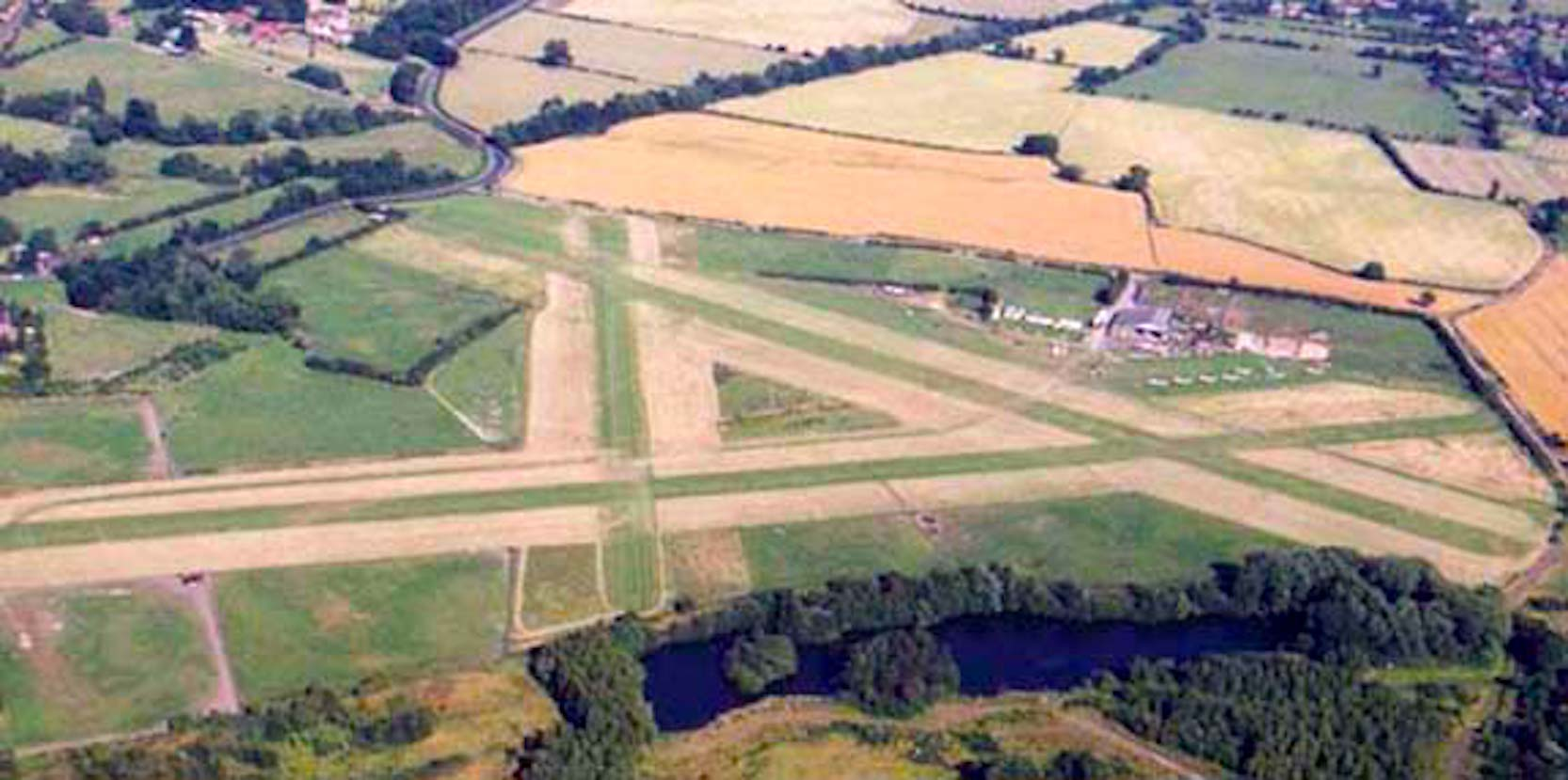
Derby Airfield in 2002, looking east along runway 10-28

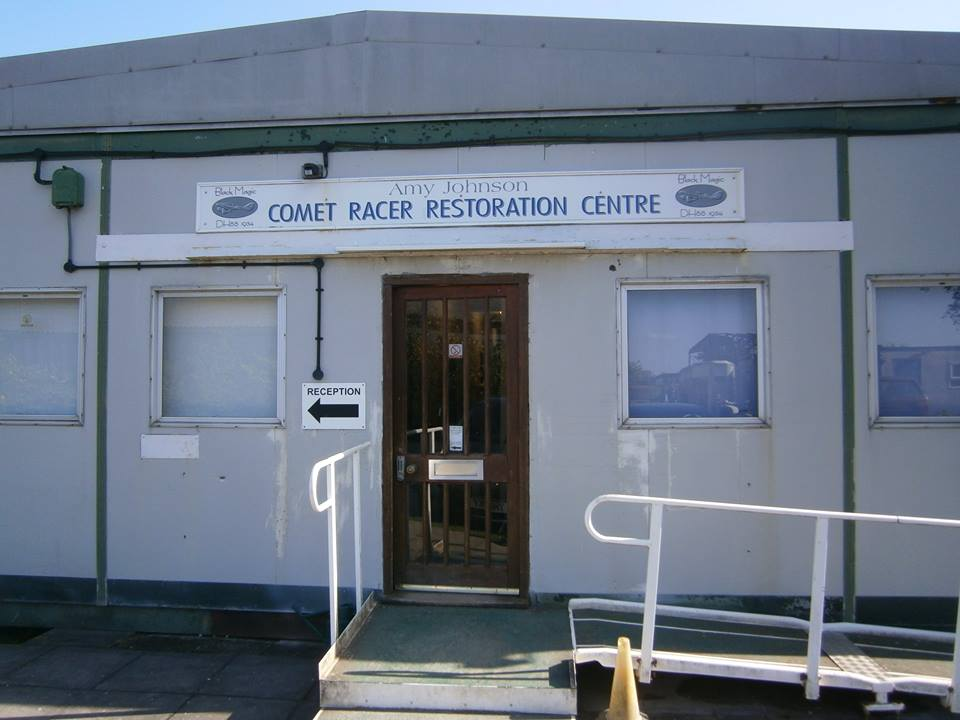
The Amy Johnson Comet Restoration Centre

An ARV Super-2 flying from Derby Airfield
