= Derby Guildhall =

Municipal building in Derby, Derbyshire, England

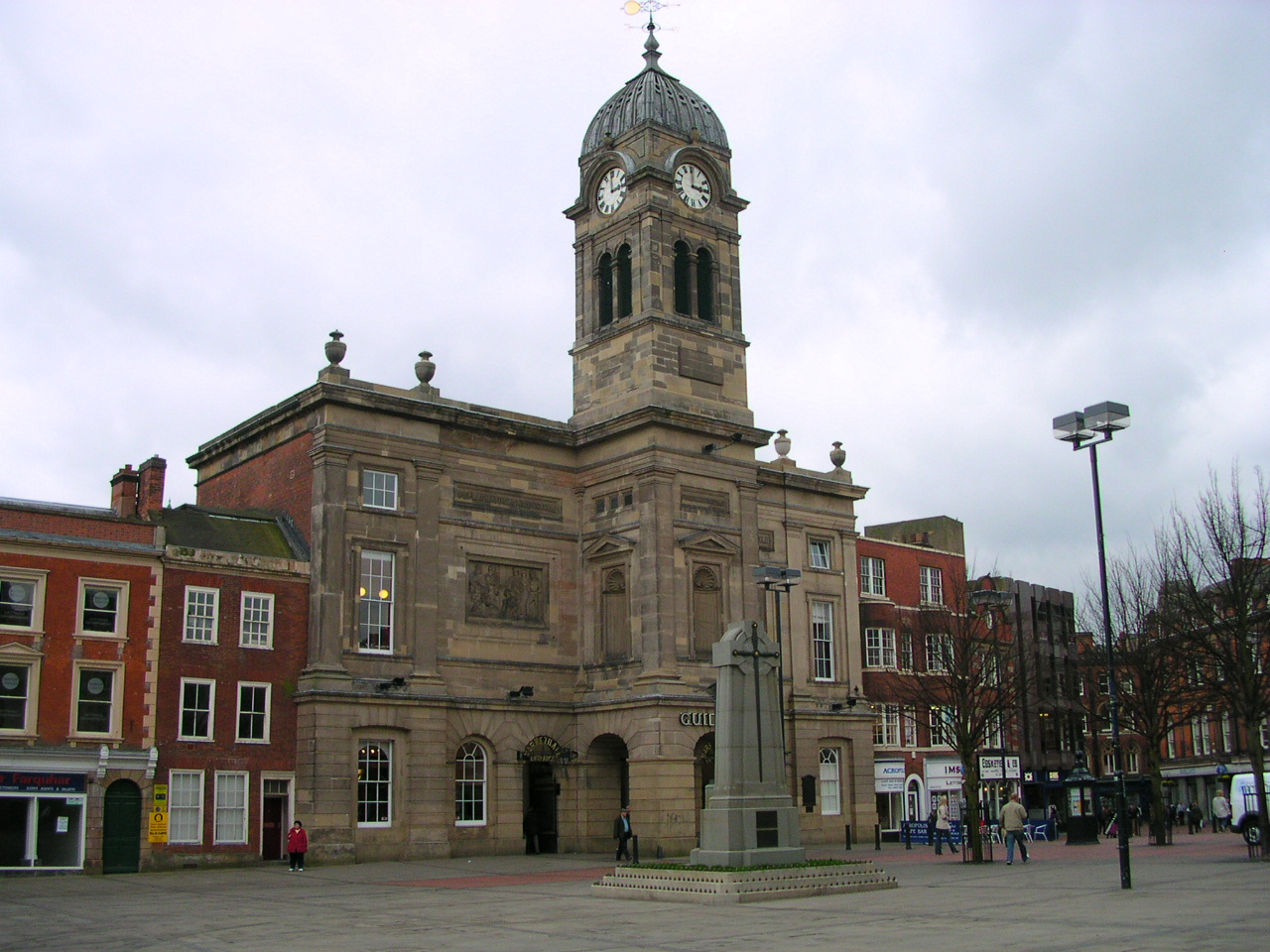
- Derby Guildhall, with the War Memorial in the foreground

- Shown in Derbyshire
- 52.9229°N 1.4764°W
- Location: Market Place, Derby

History
- Built: 1828

Site notes
- Architect(s): Matthew Habershon and Henry Duesbury
- Architectural style: Classical style

Listed Building – Grade II
- Designated: 24 February 1977
- Reference no.: 1228604

Derby Guildhall is a municipal building in the Market Place, Derby, England. It is a Grade II listed building.

== History ==
A moot hall was first established in the Market Place area in 1204. This was replaced by a timber and plaster guildhall in 1500 which, in turn, made way for a stone guildhall which was designed by Richard Jackson in the Classical style and completed in 1730. A turret clock designed by John Whitehurst was installed within the pediment above the main entrance in 1737.

The next structure, which was designed by Matthew Habershon also in the Classical style, was built slightly to the south of the previous structures and was completed in 1828. It featured a large central portico incorporating a rusticated basement storey (with three large archways providing pedestrian and carriage access to the market hall beyond), above which were four Ionic columns supporting a pediment. (Whitehurst's clock, retained from the old guildhall, was installed within the pediment of the new building). At first-floor level, the principal room behind the colonnade was the 'Grand Room or Court of Sessions', which measured 58 ft (18 m) by 35 ft (11 m) and occupied most of the frontage.

On 21 October 1841, Habershon's guildhall was severely damaged by a fire, which left only the centre and outer walls standing. It was rebuilt to a design by Henry Duesbury in 1842. The surviving walls were retained, with the exception of the portico, which (at the request of the design committee) was to be replaced with a clock tower. This contained three bells and a new quarter-chiming clock (by James Harrison of Hull) and was topped by a cupola and a weather vane. Two large stones panels, one representing a court room and the other representing a council chamber, designed by the sculptor John Bell, were added to the face of the building either side of the tower. The principal room on the first floor (the 'Hall or Court') was of similar dimensions to its predecessor; there was also on the same level a Grand Jury Room, a public waiting room and (adjoining the Court) the Recorder's room. At ground floor level rooms were provided for the police, the magistrates and the Town Clerk.

During the 19th century, a series of tunnels were built to allow prisoners to be escorted from the police station in Lock Up Yard to the assizes taking place in the guildhall.

Queen Victoria visited the Guildhall on 21 May 1891 and received a formal address from the mayor, Alfred Haslam, before departing for the site of the proposed Derbyshire Royal Infirmary, to lay a foundation stone and to knight the mayor.

The guildhall was the scene of the initial stages of the trial of the anti-war campaigner, Alice Wheeldon, in 1917. She was committed for trial at the Old Bailey in London where she was convicted of conspiracy to murder Prime Minister David Lloyd George and his cabinet colleague Arthur Henderson. A Blue Plaque to commemorate her life was subsequently erected at her home, 12 Pear Tree Road, in Normanton.

The guildhall ceased to function as the local of seat of government when the town council moved to the Council House in 1949, and the vacated guildhall was converted for use as a theatre in 1975. A main feature of theatre's programme has been the annual Christmas pantomime which has been presented by theatre companies such as the "Babbling Vagabonds" since 2000. The viability of such theatre companies was questioned after the theatre closed in January 2019 so that long-term essential building maintenance works could be carried out.
