= Conrad Electronic =

European electronics retailer

Conrad Electronic SE

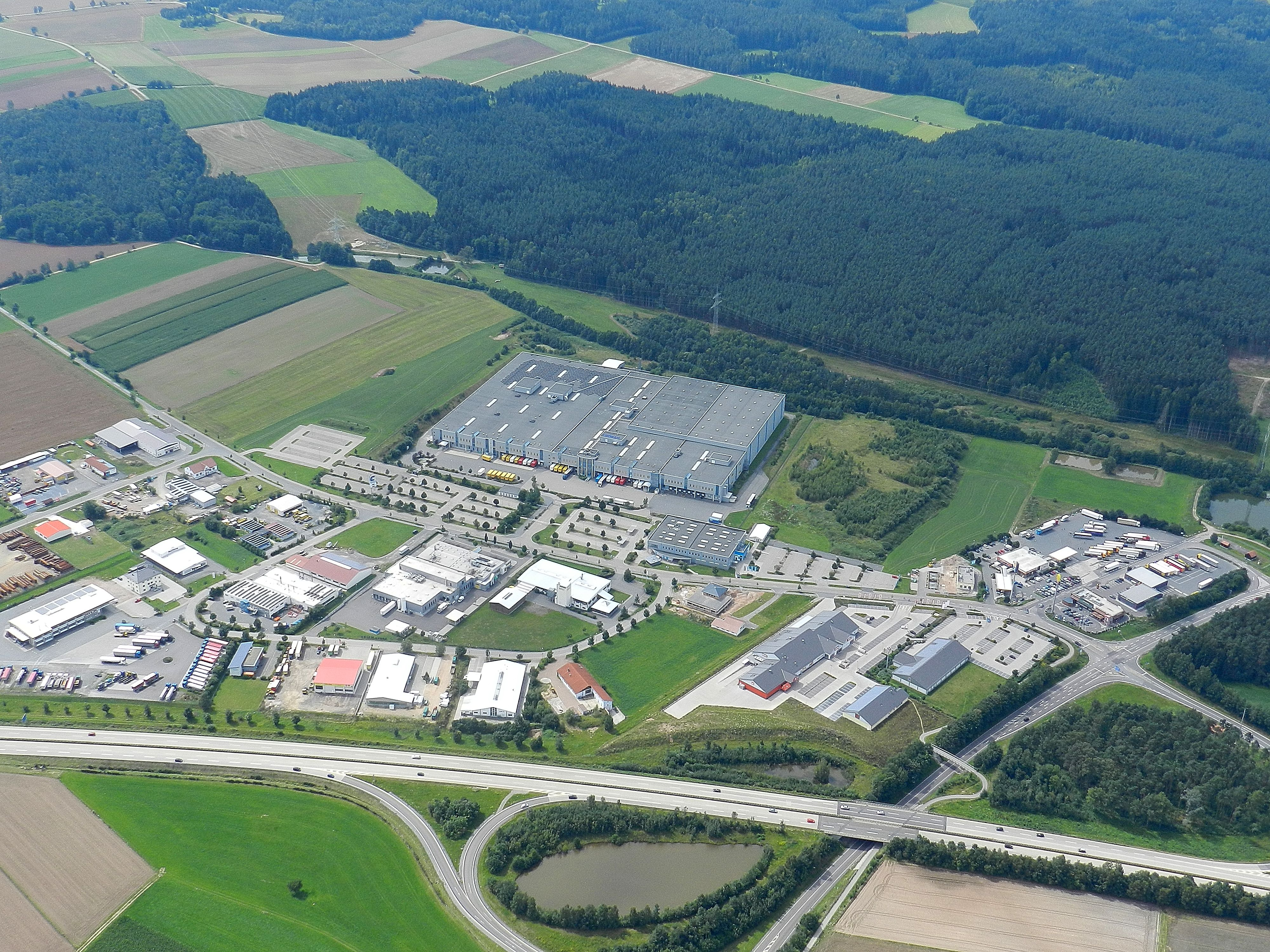
- The Conrad shipping and logistics centre at Wernberg-Köblitz
- Type: Societas Europaea
- Industry: Wholesale trade in electrical components and technical supplies
- Founded: 1923 in Berlin, Germany
- Founder: Max Conrad
- Headquarters: Hirschau, Germany
- Key people: Ralf Bühler (CEO); Jürgen Groth; Sebastian Dehnen; Werner Conrad (Chairman of the board of directors)
- Revenue: EUR 988 million (2021)
- Number of employees: 2,300 (2024)
- Website: www.conrad.com

Conrad Electronic SE is a European multinational retailer of electronic products and technology based in Hirschau, Germany. It operates a digital procurement platform for technical requirements in distance selling (mainly online) as well as products and services via its own sales team.

== Company profile ==
The company was founded in Berlin in 1923 by Max Conrad. Since 1946, the company has been headquartered in Hirschau, Germany. Conrad started out as a mail-order business for electronic components. Today, Conrad has been family-run for four generations and is one of Europe’s leading multi-channel retailers of electronics and technology.

Conrad Electronic SE is a wholly owned subsidiary of Conrad Holding SE. This in turn is managed as a family business by the Conrad family. Conrad Electronic SE is a trading company that operates exclusively in Germany. The company also operates as a marketplace operator in Germany and Austria. Business in other European countries is handled by international companies of the Conrad Group.

Conrad Electronic has been expanding its B2B business since 1998. In 2022, 70 per cent of annual sales came from the B2B business. Conrad Business Supplies was founded in 1998 to increasingly address business customers. In 2017, the Conrad B2B Marketplace was launched, through which other retailers and manufacturers can also sell products. In 2020, the Conrad Sourcing Platform was introduced as a procurement platform for the technical needs of business customers.

Ralf Bühler has been CEO of Conrad Electronic SE since 1 January 2021.

In 2024, the Conrad Electronic Group had more than 2300 employees worldwide.

== International activities ==
According to its own information, Conrad is active in 17 European countries.

In 2013, the Conrad Group acquired SOS Electronic (Hungary) and Rapid Electronics (UK). The acquisition was part of the Conrad Business Supplies strategy. Conrad has also been active with an online marketplace in Austria (2021) and in the Netherlands since 2022. This was followed in 2023 by a marketplace for the Italian B2B market.

CEI Conrad Electronic International HK Ltd. is the subsidiary of Conrad based in Hong Kong. CEI HK has been active in the Asian markets for over 40 years. The company has been operating its own purchasing offices in Hong Kong since 1988.
