= Henry Duesbury =

Henry Duesbury (a relative of the Duesbury family of Royal Crown Derby fame) was the Borough Architect for Derby from 1841 to about 1854. He designed the Derby Guildhall, the Arboretum Square entrance and orangery, and the so-called Crystal Palace at the Derby Arboretum.

The Derby Guildhall, designed by Henry Duesbury and built in 1842 as a replacement for the building destroyed by fire in 1841

There are a number of other important buildings within the city of Derby also designed by Duesbury including the county asylum (built 1849–51) which became known as the Pastures Hospital in Mickleover and is now converted into flats. He also designed the National School, Riddings, Derbyshire, opened in 1845, and a later extension to the school. The building is now Riddings Junior School.
