= Burnaston =

Village in Derbyshire, England

Coordinates: 52.890°N 1.573°W

- Village and Civil Parish
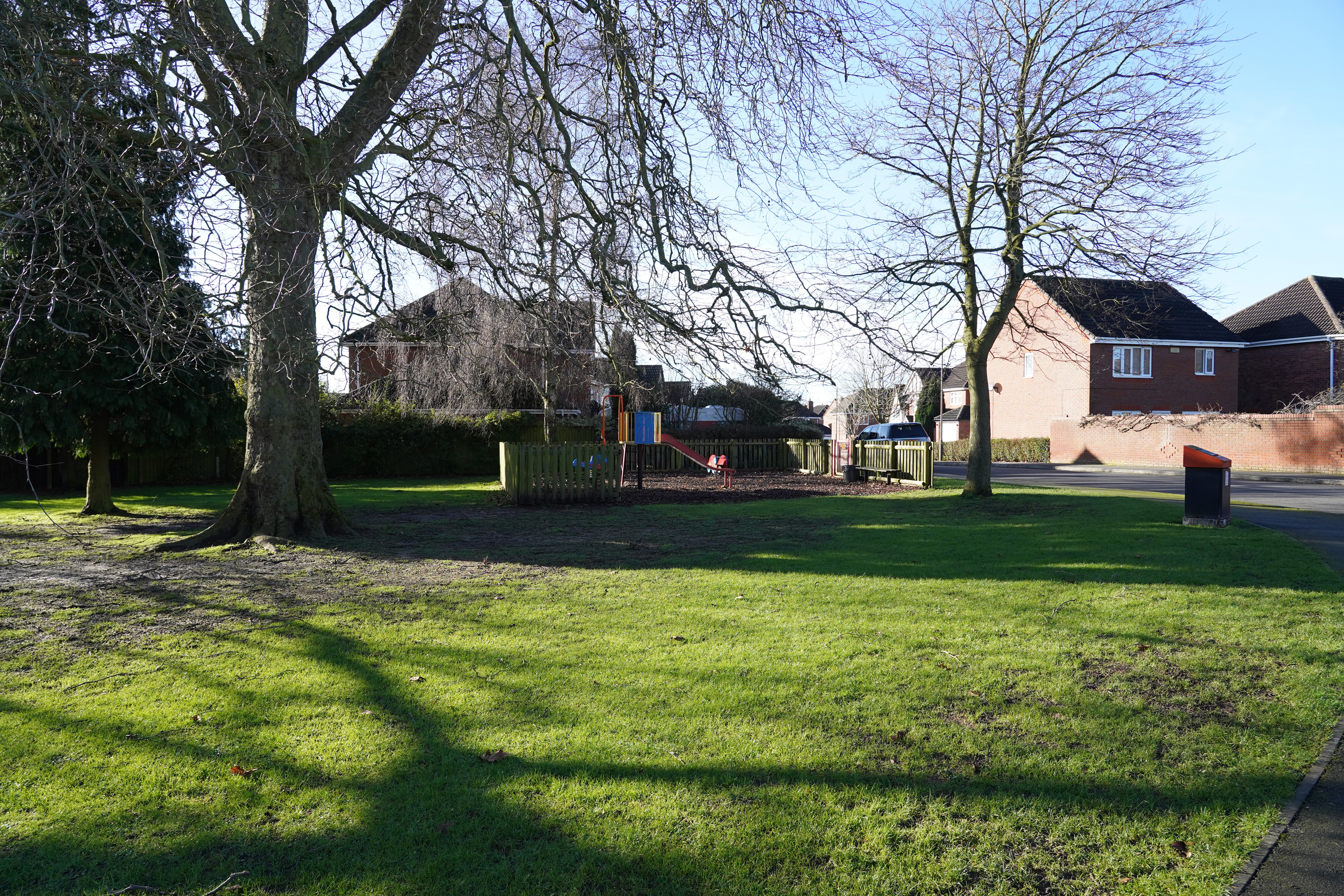
- Burnaston village

- Burnaston parish highlighted within Derbyshire
- Population: 1,531 (2011)
- OS grid reference: SK288325
- Civil parish: Burnaston
- District: South Derbyshire
- Shire county: Derbyshire
- Region: East Midlands
- Country: England
- Sovereign state: United Kingdom
- Post town: Derby
- Postcode district: DE65
- Dialling code: 01283, 01332
- Police: Derbyshire
- Fire: Derbyshire
- Ambulance: East Midlands
- UK Parliament: South Derbyshire

Burnaston is a village and civil parish in the South Derbyshire district of Derbyshire, England. It is about 4.5 miles (7.2 km) southwest of the city of Derby and has a population of 1,531. It contains the headquarters and vehicle manufacturing plant of Toyota Manufacturing UK, built on the site of the former Derby Airport.

== Demography ==
The population of the civil parish at the census of 2011 was 1,531.

== Geography ==
The village has road links with nearby cities Derby and Nottingham, as well as the city of Birmingham, approximately 40 miles (60 km) south along the A38 dual carriageway.

== History ==
Burnaston House was originally the home of the Every family, including Ashton Nicholas Every Mosley, who was the High Sheriff of Derbyshire in 1835. The house became the social centre and clubhouse for Derby Aero Club and Derby Aviation in the 1940s, when the grass field to the south east was operated as Derby Airport.

The house was eventually demolished in March 1990 to make way for the car factory, which opened nearly three years later.

== Economy ==
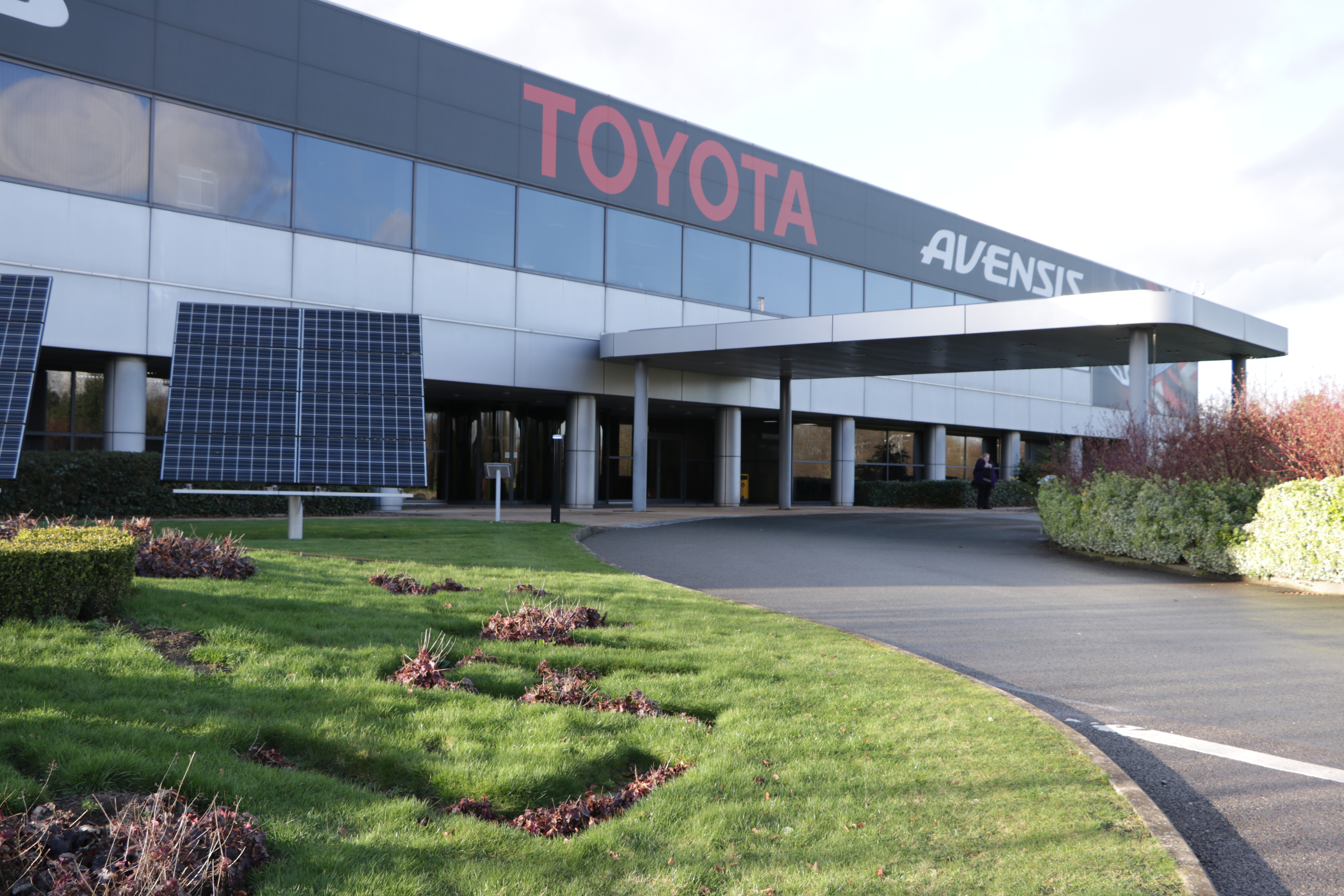
Toyota Reception Building (March 2017)

The village is known for Toyota TMUK, one of several British car plants built by Japanese carmakers as part of measures to avoid expenses such as import duties and shipping costs. Following the decision by Toyota during the second half of the 1980s to build a new factory in Europe, the plant was established in December 1989 and opened on 16 December 1992.

== Transport ==
The site for Toyota also covers the area formerly occupied by Derby Airport, a grass airfield that opened in 1938 as the municipal airport for Derby.

During World War II it was used for military training purposes. After the war it was again used by airlines, including Derby Aviation (later Derby Airways then British Midland Airways), until 1965, when the newly reconstructed East Midlands Airport opened across the county border in Leicestershire.

Private flying from Burnaston continued until December 1989, when the site was taken over by Toyota for the development of the car factory over the next three years.

== Education ==
Burnaston was the location of Burnaston College Junior School for Boys, established in 1912.

== See also ==
- Listed buildings in Burnaston
