= Female sabotage =

Female sabotage is an evolutionary theory regarding the propensity of certain females to select "burdened" males of their species for mating.

== History ==
Soon after Charles Darwin published his theory of natural selection, he was faced with a puzzle. If natural selection suggests "survival of the fittest," then there is a question as to why some males have traits that detract from their survival.

Darwin knew that there was more to natural selection than simple fitness. An equally important part of the struggle of life regards reproduction. In this case, the question becomes, "Why would a female burden her offspring with dangerous traits by mating with a similarly burdened male?"

Noting that the males with burdensome traits are almost entirely those in polygamous species, where a minority of males generally mate with many females, Darwin had an insight. He realized that if females found these male burdens more "attractive", and if that attractiveness resulted in more matings by burdened males, then the increase in matings of a few sons might offset the death of many other sons as a result of the burden. In effect, if the success of the surviving males produced enough offspring to cover more than the loss of potential offspring from their lost brothers, then the female who mated with a burdened male had chosen correctly.

== Female sabotage theory ==
In 1996, however, Joe Abraham presented a re-interpretation of the problem. In polygamous species, males generally contribute nothing to the nurturing of offspring, but nevertheless continue to consume finite resources. In such situations, males effectively become competitors with females and young once they are finished mating. This gives females a reason to sabotage males, and mating gives them an opportunity to do so. By choosing to mate exclusively with males who are unlikely to survive because of their burdens, the females ensure that as the males die, more food and other resources will remain for females and their young. Because females are the limiting resource in most species, as their numbers increase, population fitness will also increase.

Just as a given amount of land can only produce a finite amount of grazing, and a limited amount of grazing can only support a limited number of grazing animals, so a given number of grazing animals can only sustain a limited number of predators. Similar limitations apply to all living things, and are known as the carrying capacity of a physical area. If males' burdens are more likely to draw the interest of local predators, then such males effectively shift predation away from females and their young. In this case, the females and young will gain an added benefit from decreased predation, and enjoy even higher rates of survivability.

Abraham's explanation reunites the major split in sexual selection—intrasexual competition (male combat) and intersexual selection (female choice)--together under one rubric. Under female sabotage, the increase in resources becomes the critical factor, and the cause of increased male mortality is secondary. The theory also offers new, feminist approaches to leks, harems, resource guarding and mate location.

Perhaps the most attractive aspect of Abraham's explanation, however, is that it can easily work with any of the many current theories of sexual selection, and must play some role in them. An increase in resources and a decrease in predation for females and their young is an inevitable result of increased male mortality, regardless of what mechanism drives females to mate with males carrying burdensome traits.
