= Derby Philosophical Society =

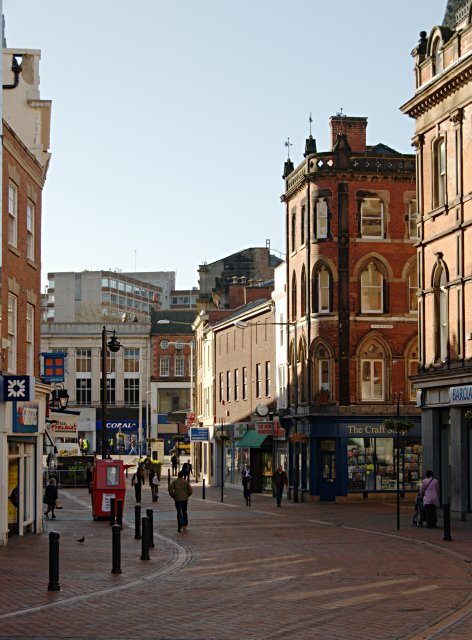
The Cornmarket in Derby where the society met from 1783

The Derby Philosophical Society was a club for gentlemen in Derby founded in 1783 by Erasmus Darwin. The club had many notable members and also offered the first institutional library in Derby that was available to some section of the public.

== Precursors ==
A Derby philosophical club or society met in the mid-18th century: it may have included amongst its members individuals such as John Whitehurst, the Lunar Society member, before he moved to London in 1775. This club continued at least to 1779. Another, earlier coterie involved Whitehurst, and it is assumed the artist Joseph Wright, his friend Peter Perez Burdett and Rev. Joshua Winter of All Saints Church.

== Founders ==
The Derby Philosophical Society was founded by Erasmus Darwin and a group of his associates in 1783, soon after he moved to Derby from Lichfield, via Radburn Hall, with his new wife Elizabeth. It was formally inaugurated in 1784 at Darwin's house in Full Street, Derby. He addressed the members, explaining that he hoped the society would build a library and perhaps produce publications. It seems that he also hoped the Derby Society would be able to hold joint meetings with the Lunar Society. The activities of the club were in fact several. It did create a notable collection of books and entertained guests, some of whom are listed in the records. Its members participated in a collective translation of the works of Linnaeus from Latin to English. The translation of A System of Vegetables, annotated by the most eminent of them, was the first book where the name of Erasmus Darwin appeared.

The society met at the King's Head Inn in the Cornmarket in Derby not far from Darwin's house at 3, Full Street. The founding members have at various times said to be seven, eight or ten people listed as Richard French, John Sneyd (1734–1809), Dr John Hollis Pigot, Dr John Beridge, Darwin, Thomas Gisborne, Samuel Fox III and William Strutt. Gisborne and Sneyd did not live in Derby. The records of the club exist, but frequently refer to people only by surname; many of the members, like Darwin, were associated with medicine.

== Membership ==
Later members included Josiah Wedgwood, the Rev. William Pickering, the Rev. Charles Hope, Dr Peter Crompton, Erasmus Darwin Jr, Robert Darwin, Richard Leaper and Henry Hadley, Mr Haden, Mr Fowler, Mr Johnson, Sacheverell Pole, William Duesbury jr, Robert Bage and Richard Archdale. About half of the membership was medical like William Brooks Johnson MD, but others included men of great influence like Sir Robert Wilmot, the engineer Jedediah Strutt, the poet and gentleman Sir Brooke Boothby, the chemist Charles Sylvester, and landowners Charles Hurt, Reverend D'Ewes Coke and Thomas Evans. Crompton, Leaper, and C. S. Hope all went on to become Mayor of Derby, and the first Lord Belper was among the later members.

William Strutt and Richard Forester were both presidents of the society after Darwin's death in 1803. Strutt had been a founding member and Forester was the son of Richard French, another founding member. The local schoolmaster and philosopher William George Spencer was secretary of the society from 1815 and his son the philosopher Herbert Spencer gained much inspiration from Derby literary and scientific culture. Significantly it was Spencer who coined the phrase "survival of the fittest", after he read Darwin's grandson's work on evolution. Other notable associates of the society were James Pilkington, the radical minister and the author of A View of Derbyshire; and Abraham Bennet, though he was never a member.

== Context and later developments ==
During Darwin's time as the leading light of the society he had a house on Full Street in Derby. Although this house is now demolished a plaque was placed on the site in 2002 to recognise Darwin's contribution and that he had founded the Derby Philosophical Society.

The Derby Philosophical Society was just one of a number of literary and scientific associations that existed in the town during the eighteenth and nineteenth centuries reflecting the importance of public scientific culture in the English provinces at this time. Other examples include a Derby Literary and Philosophical Society c1808-1816, the Derby Mechanics' Institute, the Derby Town and County Museum and Natural History Society founded in 1834, and another Literary and Scientific Society that flourished during the 1840s and 1850s. To these should be added the innovative Derbyshire General Infirmary opened in 1810 and John Claudius Loudon's Derby Arboretum opened in 1840, both of which were strongly associated with the activities of the Derby philosophers and helped to create a public platform for science.

In 1858, the Derby Philosophical Society moved to a house on the Wardwick in Derby as it merged with the Derby Town and County Museum and the Natural History Society. This move included the society's library of 4,000 volumes, Mathematical and scientific apparatus and its collection of fossils.
