= Elizabeth Bridget Pigot =

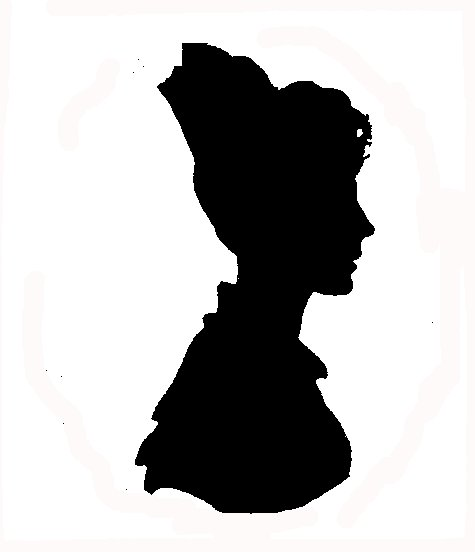
- A contemporary silhouette
- Born: 1783; St Werburgh's parish in Derby
- Died: 1866 (aged 82–83)
- Education: at home
- Parent(s): John Hollis and Margaret Pigot

Elizabeth Bridget Pigot (1783–1866) was a correspondent, friend and biographic source for Lord Byron.

== Biography ==
Pigot was born on 20 September 1783 in St Werburgh's parish in Derby, to Dr John Hollis Pigot and his wife Margaret (born Becher). Elizabeth's father, John, was a physician and one of the founders of Derby Philosophical Society with Erasmus Darwin and William Strutt. Pigot's father died when he was 36.

In 1804, when she was 21, she met the sixteen-year-old Byron, who had moved opposite hers into Burbage Manor, Southwell, in April of that year. They became friends and she used to accompany his singing on the piano. Pigot and Byron corresponded with each other until 1811. During this time Byron was at Trinity College, Cambridge, whereas Pigot appears to have received her education at home or at a nearby girls' school. Pigot used to copy out the poems that Byron sent her. Some of Byron's early encouragement with his poetry came from Pigot. In 1806 and 1807 Elizabeth and her brother John, who was also a friend of Byron's, helped to expedite the publication of three of Byron's poetic works through a publisher in Newark.

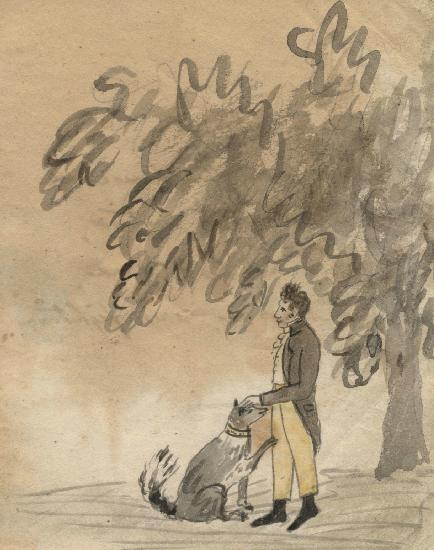
A watercolour from Pigot's hand sewn book which has a poem and illustrations about Byron and his dog

In 1807 Pigot became engaged briefly to an Indian Army officer: this did not lead to marriage, but it did result in Byron writing a poem dedicated to Pigot. In the same year, Pigot created a short story in verse that featured Byron, called "The Wonderful History of Lord Byron and his Dog," which she illustrated in her water colours with sketches of Byron and his dog. The work is thought to be a parody of Sarah Catherine Martin's Comic Adventures of Old Mother Hubbard and her Dog.

There appears to be little evidence for a romantic connection between Pigot and Byron but she did keep locks of his hair. It was reported in the first issue of the Dictionary of National Biography that Pigot's engagement was broken off as a result of writing letters both to her fiancé and to Byron, and then placing the letters in the wrong envelopes. However this story is not included in the latest version.

Pigot also created a painting of Byron's eye which has led some to speculate that Pigot's feelings may not have been entirely platonic. She was upset when Byron's former mistress visited from Italy and failed to call upon her. Pigot documented Byron's life, and six years later the Contessa Guiccioli sent her a lock of her hair, which Pigot placed with a similar cutting from Byron.

In 1828 she was "discovered" by the first of Byron's biographers, Thomas Moore. Pigot was able to supply him with a great deal of information. Pigot started a correspondence with John Murray (of the publishing family) who was involved with Byron's publishings and his biography. It was Moore and the publisher John Murray who burnt Byron's papers to prevent further scandal. She eventually received engravings from his son, also John Murray, in thanks for her assistance. In the same year she managed to catch a glance of Byron's daughter Ada Lovelace which pleased her.
