= John Sneyd =

English landowner

John Sneyd (1734–1809) was an English landowner, at Bishton Hall near Colwich, and Belmont Hall near Ipstones, Staffordshire, and High Sheriff of Staffordshire in 1763. He was a prominent citizen of Lichfield. He was known also as a botanist, agriculturist and tree-planter.

== Life ==
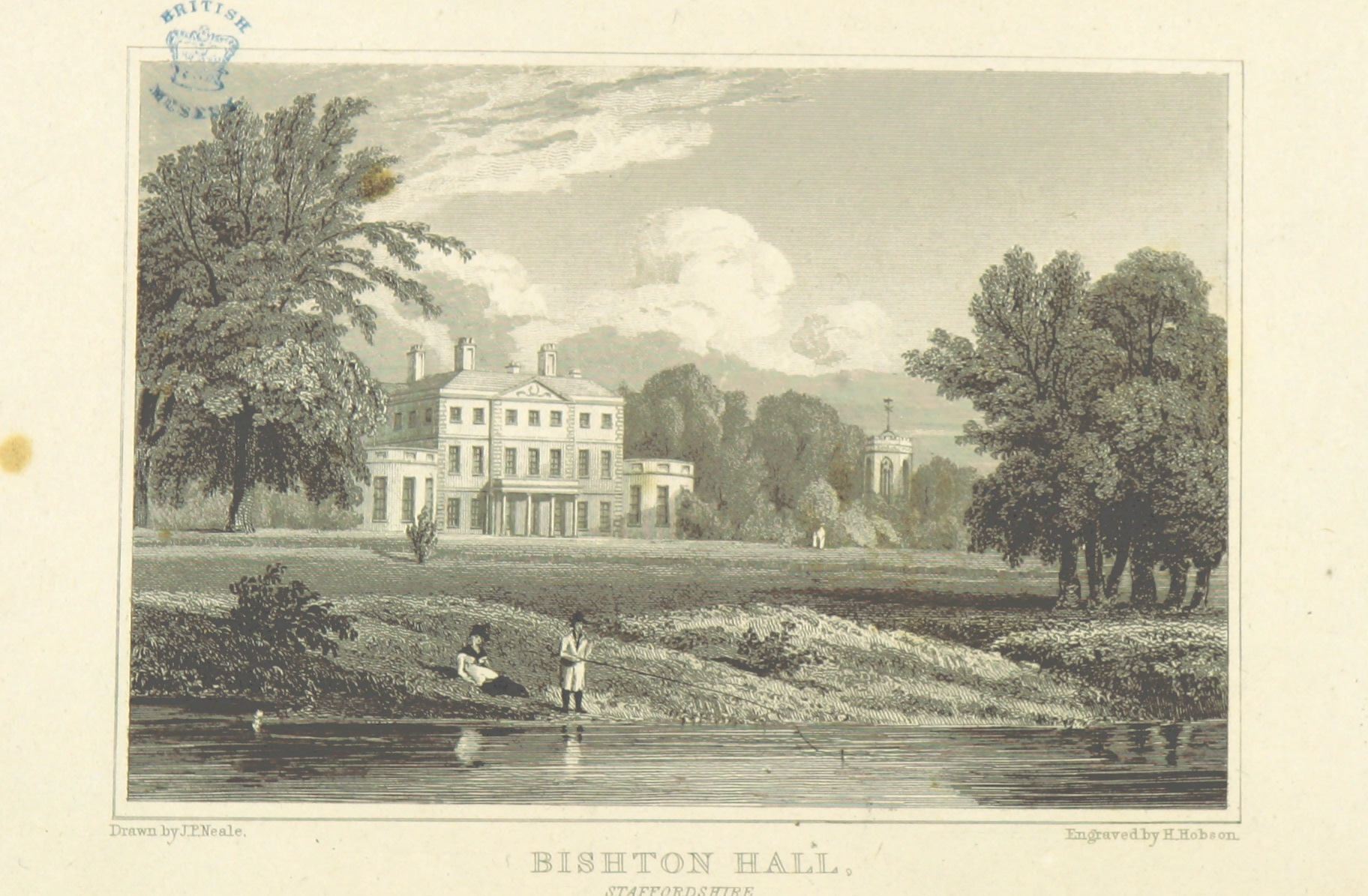
Bishton Hall, 1818 engraving

John Sneyd was the second son of William Sneyd (died 1745) of Bishton and his wife Susanna Edmonds or Edmunds, a daughter of William Hedges. William Palmer (c.1732–1772) of Ladbroke Hall was a schoolfellow: where is not clear, and Hervey suggested Westminster School. (That is not supported by The Record of Old Westminsters, but his brother apparently was there.)

Sneyd entered the Middle Temple in 1747. He matriculated in 1752 at Brasenose College, Oxford, graduating B.A. in 1756. His elder brother William Hedges Sneyd died in 1757, without issue, and John Sneyd was his heir.

In 1768, Sneyd accompanied Joseph Banks on a visit to George Anson at Shugborough Hall, and the area of the River Trent. When, later that year, Banks went on the first voyage of James Cook, he left his herbarium with Sneyd.

Sneyd sold his Bishton estate, to John Sparrow, to concentrate on development of his land at Onecote. In 1776, Sneyd sold Hodnell, a manor and deserted medieval village in Warwickshire south of Ladbroke, to Robert Ladbroke of Idlicott. It had come into the family from his mother's marriage settlement. There was an inclosure act for Ipstones, south-west of Onecote, the Ipstones Inclosure Act 1777 (17 Geo. 3. c. 130 Pr.). At Belmont, on enclosed moorlands, Sneyd created extensive plantations of trees, for which he was awarded medals by the Society of Arts. He was reckoned to have planted 13,000 larches in 1784–6, and published a paper in the Society's Transactions for 1798, On Planting Larch.

A friend of Erasmus Darwin, Sneyd was a founder member of the Derby Philosophical Society in 1783. He delivered in 1792 an abolitionist petition, signed by, among others, members of the Society including Darwin and Robert Bage, to the High Sheriff of Staffordshire.

Sneyd died at Belmont Hall, on 9 December 1809.

== Interests ==
Sneyd made extensive annotations to A General View of the Agriculture of the County of Stafford, with Observations on the Means of its Improvement (1794), by William Pitt (1749–1823). He also contributed substantially to An Arrangement of British Plants (1796) by William Withering.

== Family ==
Sneyd was married three times, firstly to Penelope Kynnersley, eldest daughter of Thomas Kynnersley of Loxley Park, with whom he had ten children. Her brother Clement willed property to their son Thomas, who became Thomas Sneyd-Kynnersley. He was the grandfather of Thomas Kynnersley.

Mary Adey (1742–1830), a friend of Samuel Johnson, became Sneyd's third wife in 1794.
