= William George Spencer =

English schoolmaster and mathematical writer (1790-1866)

- Born: 1790; Derby, England
- Died: 26 April 1866 (aged 75–76); Derby, England
- Occupation: Schoolmaster
- Spouse: Harriet Holmes (m. 1819)
- Children: 9, including Herbert Spencer

William George Spencer (1790–1866) was an English schoolmaster and tutor, known as a mathematical writer.

== Life ==
Born at Derby in 1790, he was the son of Matthew Spencer (1762–1827), schoolmaster at Derby, by his wife Catherine Taylor. Rev. Thomas Spencer (1796–1853) was his younger brother. He was educated at his father's school in Derby. After assisting his father he began, at the age of 17, to take private pupils in algebra, Euclid, astronomy, physics, and other mathematical subjects, and continued to teach throughout life. As an educator he was noted as a follower of Johann Pestalozzi, and for his teaching of girls, who made up at least half of his students, without difference of syllabus. Illness forced him to give up school teaching around 1825, however, and he moved to Nottingham, taking up the lace business. He then returned to Derby, to work as a tutor.

Spencer acted as secretary to the Derby Philosophical Society. A dissenter who had quarrelled with the local Methodists, he attended a Quaker meeting-house. He died in March 1866.

== Works ==
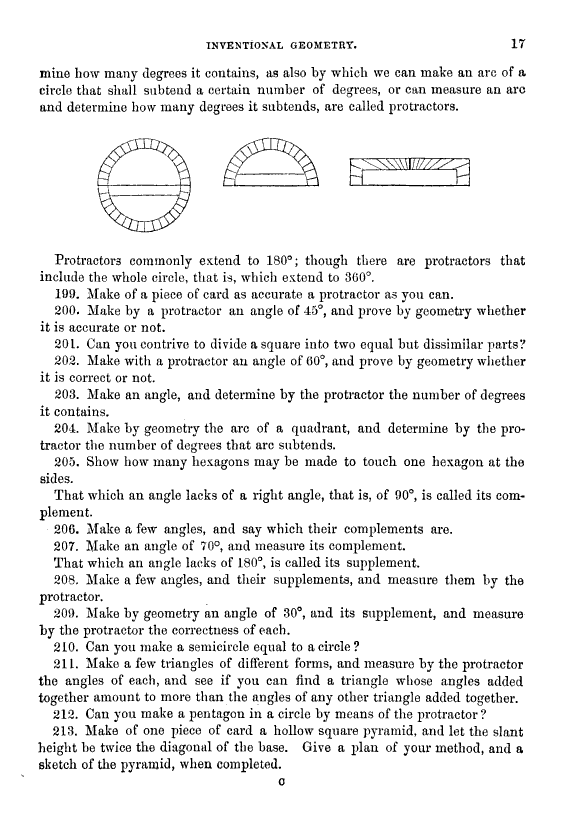
Page from Inventional Geometry (1860) by William George Spencer

In Inventional Geometry (1860), Spencer taught elementary geometry by a gradual transition from the concrete to the abstract, a method now considered to have been at least a generation ahead of its time. The book was republished in 1892 by his son, and was widely adopted as a textbook. He wrote also was the author of A System of Lucid Shorthand, in manuscript was completed from 1843, and first published in 1894.

== Family ==
By his wife Harriet, daughter of John Holmes, whom he married in 1819, Spencer had a better-known son, Herbert Spencer.

== Notes ==
Attribution

- This article incorporates text from a publication now in the public domain: Lee, Sidney, ed. (1898). "Spencer, William George". Dictionary of National Biography. Vol. 53. London: Smith, Elder & Co.
