= Herbert Spencer =

English philosopher and political theorist (1820–1903)

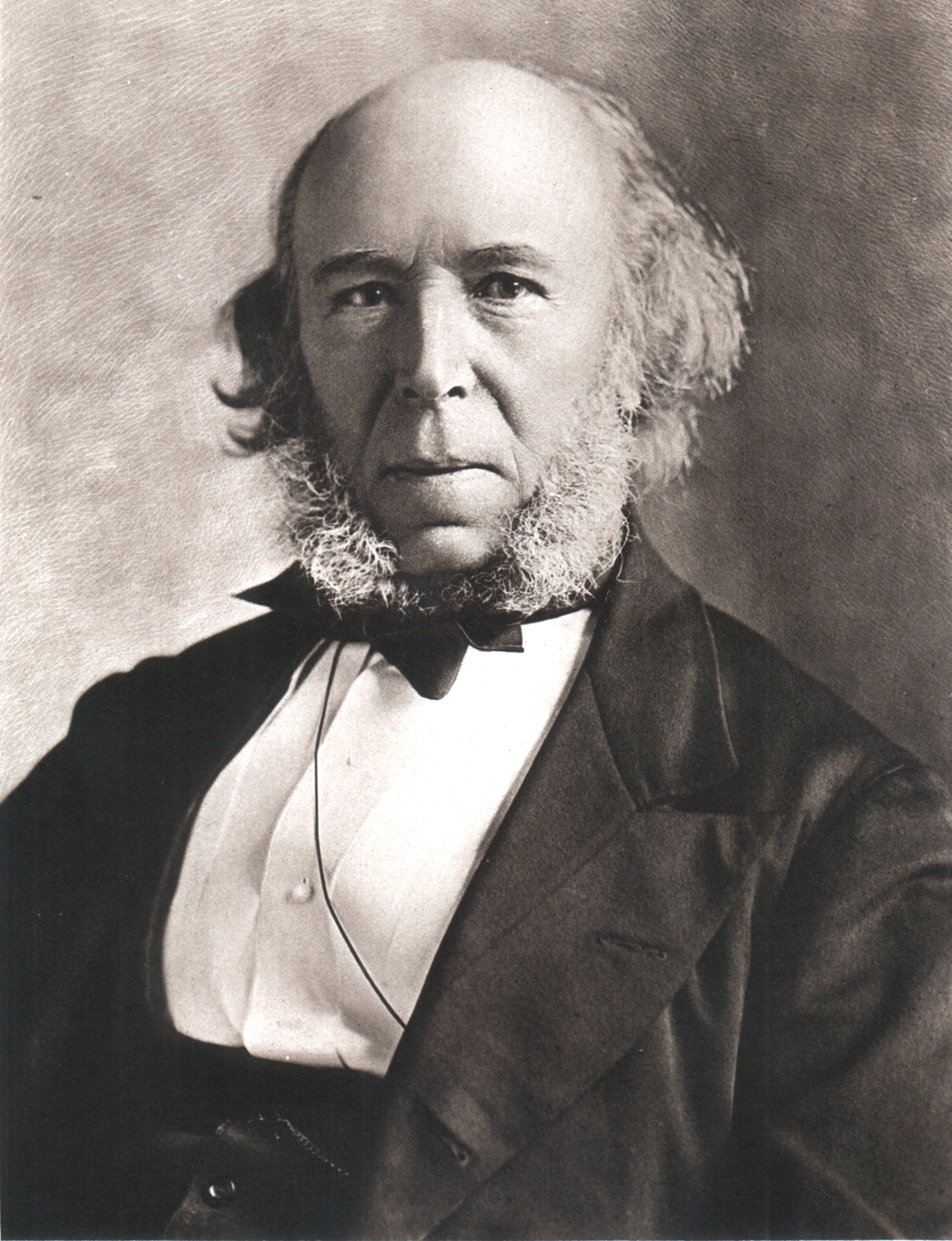
- Born: 27 April 1820; Derby, Derbyshire, England
- Died: 8 December 1903 (aged 83); Brighton, Sussex, England
- Father: William George Spencer

Philosophical work
- Era: 19th-century philosophy
- Region: Western philosophy
- School: Classical liberalism
- Main interests: Anthropology, biology, evolution, laissez-faire, positivism, psychology, sociology, utilitarianism
- Notable works: Social Statics (1851); The Man Versus the State (1884)
- Notable ideas: Synthetic philosophy Law of equal liberty Social Darwinism; Social organism Survival of the fittest There is no alternative

Herbert Spencer (27 April 1820 – 8 December 1903) was an English polymath active as a philosopher, psychologist, biologist, sociologist, and anthropologist. Spencer originated the expression "survival of the fittest", which he coined in Principles of Biology (1864) after reading Charles Darwin's 1859 book On the Origin of Species. The term strongly suggests natural selection, yet Spencer saw evolution as extending into realms of sociology and ethics, so he also supported Lamarckism.

Spencer developed an all-embracing conception of evolution as the progressive development of the physical world, biological organisms, the human mind, and human culture and societies. As a polymath, he contributed to a wide range of subjects, including ethics, religion, anthropology, economics, political theory, philosophy, literature, astronomy, biology, sociology, and psychology. During his lifetime he achieved tremendous authority, mainly in English-speaking academia. Spencer was "the single most famous European intellectual in the closing decades of the nineteenth century" but his influence declined sharply after 1900: "Who now reads Spencer?" asked Talcott Parsons in 1937.

== Early life and education ==
Spencer was born in Derby, Derbyshire, England, on 27 April 1820, the son of William George Spencer (generally called George). Spencer's father was a religious dissenter who drifted from Methodism to Quakerism, and who transmitted to his son an opposition to all forms of authority. He ran a school founded on the progressive teaching methods of Johann Heinrich Pestalozzi and also served as secretary of the Derby Philosophical Society, a scientific society which had been founded in 1783 by Erasmus Darwin, the grandfather of Charles Darwin.

Spencer was educated in empirical science by his father, while the members of the Derby Philosophical Society introduced him to pre-Darwinian concepts of biological evolution, particularly those of Erasmus Darwin and Jean-Baptiste Lamarck. His uncle, the Reverend Thomas Spencer, vicar of Hinton Charterhouse near Bath, completed Spencer's limited formal education by teaching him some mathematics and physics, and enough Latin to enable him to translate some easy texts. Thomas Spencer also imprinted on his nephew his own firm free-trade and anti-statist political views. Otherwise, Spencer was an autodidact who acquired most of his knowledge from narrowly-focused readings and conversations with his friends and acquaintances.

== Career ==
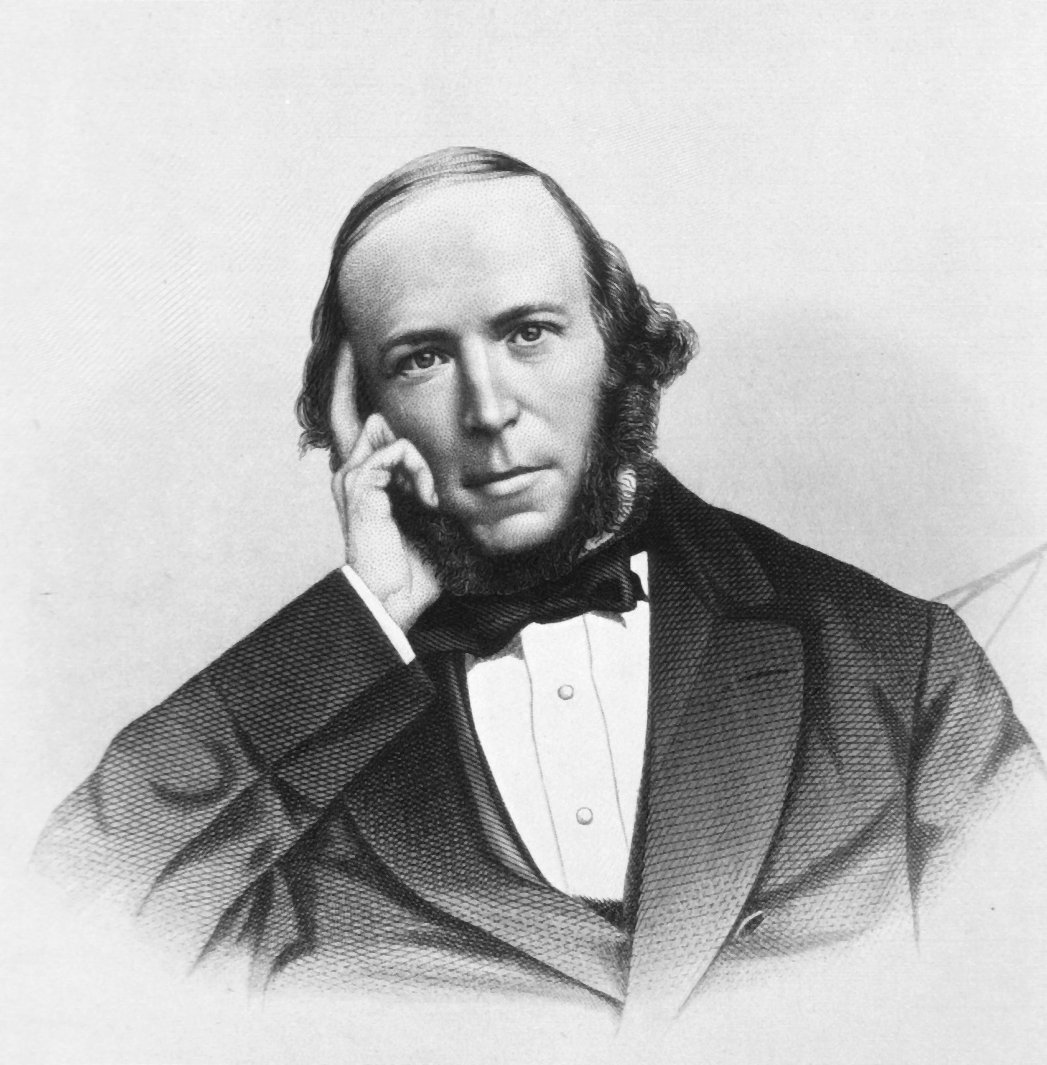
Spencer as a young man

Both as an adolescent and as a young man, Spencer found it difficult to settle to any intellectual or professional discipline. He worked as a civil engineer during the railway boom of the late 1830s, while also devoting much of his time to writing for provincial journals that were nonconformist in their religion and radical in their politics.

=== Writing ===
Spencer published his first book, Social Statics (1851), whilst working as sub-editor on the free-trade journal The Economist from 1848 to 1853. He predicted that humanity would eventually become completely adapted to the requirements of living in society with the consequential withering away of the state. Radical publisher John Chapman, who lived across the Strand from The Economist’s offices, introduced Spencer to his salon which was attended by many of the leading radical and progressive thinkers of the capital, including John Stuart Mill, Harriet Martineau, George Henry Lewes and Mary Ann Evans (George Eliot), with whom he was briefly romantically linked. Spencer himself introduced the biologist Thomas Henry Huxley, who would later win fame as 'Darwin's Bulldog' and who remained Spencer's lifelong friend. However, it was the friendship of Evans and Lewes that acquainted him with John Stuart Mill's A System of Logic and with Auguste Comte's positivism and which set him on the road to his life's work. He strongly disagreed with Comte.

Spencer's second book, Principles of Psychology, published in 1855, explored a physiological basis for psychology, and was the fruit of his friendship with Evans and Lewes. The book was founded on his fundamental assumption that the human mind is subject to natural laws and that these can be discovered within the framework of general biology. This permitted the adoption of a developmental perspective not merely in terms of the individual (as in traditional psychology), but also of the species and the race. Through this paradigm, Spencer aimed to reconcile the associationist psychology of Mill's Logic, the notion that the human mind is constructed from atomic sensations held together by the laws of the association of ideas, with the apparently more 'scientific' theory of phrenology, which locates specific mental functions in specific parts of the brain.

Spencer argued that both these theories are partial accounts of the truth: repeated associations of ideas are embodied in the formation of specific strands of brain tissue, and these can be passed from one generation to the next by means of the Lamarckian mechanism of use-inheritance. The Psychology, he believed, would do for the human mind what Isaac Newton had done for matter. However, the book was not initially successful and the last of the 251 copies of its first edition were not sold until June 1861.

Spencer's interest in psychology derived from a more fundamental concern which was to establish the universality of natural law. In common with others of his generation, including the members of Chapman's salon, he was possessed with the idea of demonstrating that it is possible to show that everything in the universe – including human culture, language, and morality – could be explained by laws of universal validity. This was in contrast to the views of many theologians of the time who insisted that some parts of creation, in particular the human soul, are beyond the realm of scientific investigation. Comte's Système de Philosophie Positive had been written with the ambition of demonstrating the universality of natural law, and Spencer was to follow Comte in the scale of his ambition. However, Spencer differed from Comte in believing it is possible to discover a single law of universal application which he identified with progressive development and was to call the principle of evolution.

In 1858, Spencer produced an outline of what was to become the System of Synthetic Philosophy. This immense undertaking, which has few parallels in the English language, aimed to demonstrate that the principle of evolution applies in biology, psychology, sociology (Spencer appropriated Comte's term for the new discipline) and morality. Spencer envisaged that this work of ten volumes would take twenty years to complete; in the end, it took him twice as long and consumed almost all the rest of his long life.

Despite Spencer's early struggles to establish himself as a writer, by the 1870s he had become the most famous philosopher of the age. His works were widely read during his lifetime, and by 1869 he was able to support himself solely on the profit of book sales and on income from his regular contributions to Victorian periodicals which were collected as three volumes of Essays. His works were translated into German, Italian, Spanish, French, Russian, Japanese and Chinese, and into many other languages and he was offered honours and awards all over Europe and North America. He also became a member of the Athenaeum, an exclusive Gentleman's Club in London open only to those distinguished in the arts and sciences, and the X Club, a dining club of nine founded by T.H. Huxley that met every month and included some of the most prominent thinkers of the Victorian age (three of whom would become presidents of the Royal Society).

Members included physicist-philosopher John Tyndall and Darwin's cousin, the banker and biologist Sir John Lubbock. There were also some quite significant satellites such as liberal clergyman Arthur Stanley, the Dean of Westminster; and guests such as Charles Darwin and Hermann von Helmholtz were entertained from time to time. Through such associations, Spencer had a strong presence in the heart of the scientific community and was able to secure an influential audience for his views.

=== Later life ===
The last decades of Spencer's life were characterised by growing disillusionment and loneliness. He never married, and after 1855 was a life-long hypochondriac who complained endlessly of pains and maladies that no physician could diagnose at that time. His excitability and sensitivity to disagreement handicapped his social life:

His nervous sensibility was extreme. A game of billiards was enough to deprive him of his night's rest. He had been looking forward with pleasure to a meeting with Huxley; but he gave it up because there was a difference on some scientific question between them, and this might have given rise to an argument, which Spencer's nerves could not bear.

By the 1890s his readership had begun to desert him while many of his closest friends died and he had come to doubt the confident faith in progress that he had made the centre-piece of his philosophical system. His later years were also ones in which his political views became increasingly conservative. Whereas Social Statics had been the work of a radical democrat who believed in votes for women (and even for children) and in the nationalisation of the land to break the power of the aristocracy, by the 1880s he had become a staunch opponent of female suffrage and made common cause with the landowners of the Liberty and Property Defence League against what they saw as the drift towards 'socialism' of elements (such as Sir William Harcourt) within the administration of William Ewart Gladstone – largely against the opinions of Gladstone himself. Spencer's political views from this period were expressed in what has become his most famous work, The Man Versus the State.

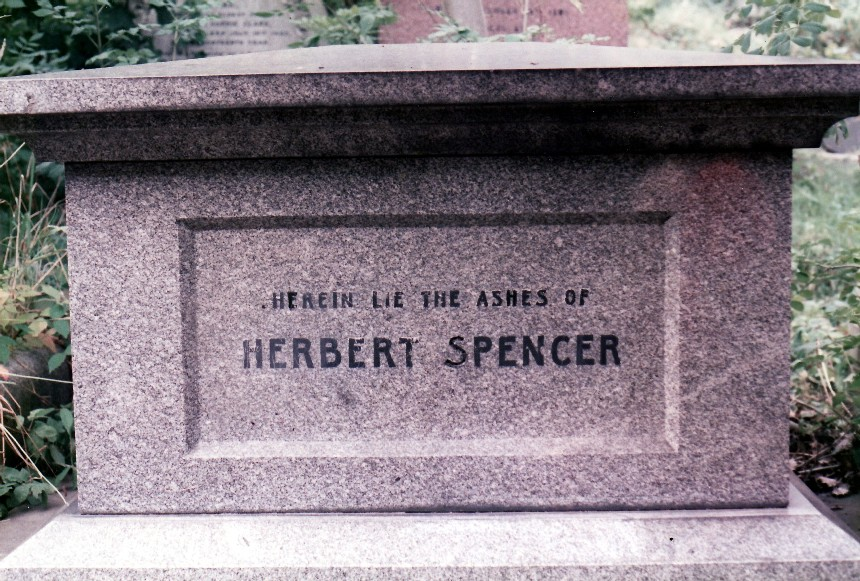
Spencer's tomb, in Highgate Cemetery, north London

The exception to Spencer's growing conservatism was that he remained throughout his life an ardent opponent of imperialism and militarism. His critique of the Boer War was especially scathing, and it contributed to his declining popularity in Britain.

He was elected as a member to the American Philosophical Society in 1883.

=== Invention of paper-clip ===
Spencer also invented a precursor to the modern paper clip, though it looked more like a modern cotter pin. This "binding-pin" was distributed by Ackermann & Company. Spencer shows drawings of the pin in Appendix I (following Appendix H) of his autobiography along with published descriptions of its uses.

=== Death and legacy ===
In 1902, shortly before his death, Spencer was nominated for the Nobel Prize in Literature, which was assigned to the German Theodor Mommsen. He continued writing all his life, in later years often by dictation, until he succumbed to poor health at the age of 83. His ashes are interred in the eastern side of London's Highgate Cemetery facing Karl Marx's grave. At Spencer's funeral, the Indian nationalist leader Shyamji Krishna Varma announced a donation of £1,000 to establish a lectureship at Oxford University in tribute to Spencer and his work.

== Work ==
=== Agnosticism ===
Spencer's reputation among the Victorians owed a great deal to his agnosticism. He rejected theology as representing the "impiety of the pious". He was to gain much notoriety from his repudiation of traditional religion, and was frequently condemned by religious thinkers for allegedly advocating atheism and materialism. Nonetheless, unlike Thomas Henry Huxley, whose agnosticism was a militant creed directed at "the unpardonable sin of faith" (in Adrian Desmond's phrase), Spencer insisted that he was not concerned with undermining religion in the name of science, but to bring about a reconciliation of the two. The following argument is a summary of Part 1 of his First Principles (2nd ed. 1867).

Starting either from religious belief or from science, Spencer argued, we are ultimately driven to accept certain indispensable but literally inconceivable notions. Whether we are concerned with a Creator or the substratum which underlies our experience of phenomena, we can frame no conception of it. Therefore, Spencer concluded, religion and science agree in the supreme truth that human understanding is only capable of 'relative' knowledge. This is the case since, owing to the inherent limitations of the human mind, it is only possible to obtain knowledge of phenomena, not of the reality ('the absolute') underlying phenomena. Hence both science and religion must come to recognise as the 'most certain of all facts that the Power which the Universe manifests to us is utterly inscrutable.' He called this awareness of 'the Unknowable' and he presented worship of the Unknowable as capable of being a positive faith which could substitute for conventional religion. Indeed, he thought that the Unknowable represents the ultimate stage in the evolution of religion, the final elimination of its last anthropomorphic vestiges.

=== Ethics ===
Spencer predicted in his first book that the endpoint of the evolutionary process will be the creation of 'the perfect man in the perfect society' with human beings becoming completely adapted to social life. The chief difference between Spencer's earlier and later conceptions of this process is the evolutionary timescale involved. The psychological – and hence also the moral – constitution which has been bequeathed to the present generation by our ancestors, and which we in turn will hand on to future generations, is in the process of gradual adaptation to the requirements of living in society. For example, aggression is a survival instinct which was necessary in the primitive conditions of life, but is maladaptive in advanced societies. Because human instincts have a specific location in strands of brain tissue, they are subject to the Lamarckian mechanism of use-inheritance so that gradual modifications could be transmitted to future generations. Over the course of many generations, the evolutionary process will ensure that human beings will become less aggressive and increasingly altruistic, leading eventually to a perfect society in which no one would cause another person pain.

However, Spencer held, for evolution to produce the perfect individual, it is necessary for present and future generations to experience the 'natural' consequences of their conduct. Only in this way will individuals have the incentives required to work on self-improvement and thus to hand an improved moral constitution to their descendants. Hence anything that interferes with the 'natural' relationship of conduct and consequence was to be resisted and this included the use of the coercive power of the state to relieve poverty, to provide public education, or to require compulsory vaccination. Although charitable giving is to be encouraged, even it has to be limited by the consideration that suffering is frequently the result of individuals receiving the consequences of their actions. Hence too much individual benevolence directed to the 'undeserving poor' would break the link between conduct and consequence that Spencer considered fundamental to ensuring that humanity continues to evolve to a higher level of development.

Spencer adopted a utilitarian standard of ultimate value – the greatest happiness of the greatest number – and the culmination of the evolutionary process will be the maximization of utility. In the perfect society, individuals would not only derive pleasure from the exercise of altruism ('positive beneficence') but would aim to avoid inflicting pain on others ('negative beneficence'). They would also instinctively respect the rights of others, leading to the universal observance of the principle of justice – each person had the right to a maximum amount of liberty that was compatible with a like liberty in others. 'Liberty' is interpreted to mean the absence of coercion, and is closely connected to the right to private property. Spencer termed this code of conduct 'Absolute Ethics' which provided a scientifically grounded moral system that could substitute for the supernaturally-based ethical systems of the past. However, he recognized that our inherited moral constitution does not currently permit us to behave in full compliance with the code of Absolute Ethics, and for this reason, we need a code of 'Relative Ethics' which takes into account the distorting factors of our present imperfections.

Spencer's distinctive view of musicology was also related to his ethics. Spencer thought that the origin of music is to be found in impassioned oratory. Speakers have persuasive effect not only by the reasoning of their words, but by their cadence and tone – the musical qualities of their voice serve as "the commentary of the emotions upon the propositions of the intellect," as Spencer put it. Music, conceived as the heightened development of this characteristic of speech, makes a contribution to the ethical education and progress of the species. "The strange capacity which we have for being affected by melody and harmony, may be taken to imply both that it is within the possibilities of our nature to realize those intenser delights they dimly suggest, and that they are in some way concerned in the realization of them. If so the power and the meaning of music become comprehensible; but otherwise they are a mystery."

Spencer's last years were characterized by a collapse of his initial optimism, replaced instead by a pessimism regarding the future of mankind. Nevertheless, he devoted much of his efforts to reinforcing his arguments and preventing the misinterpretation of his monumental theory of non-interference.

=== Evolution ===
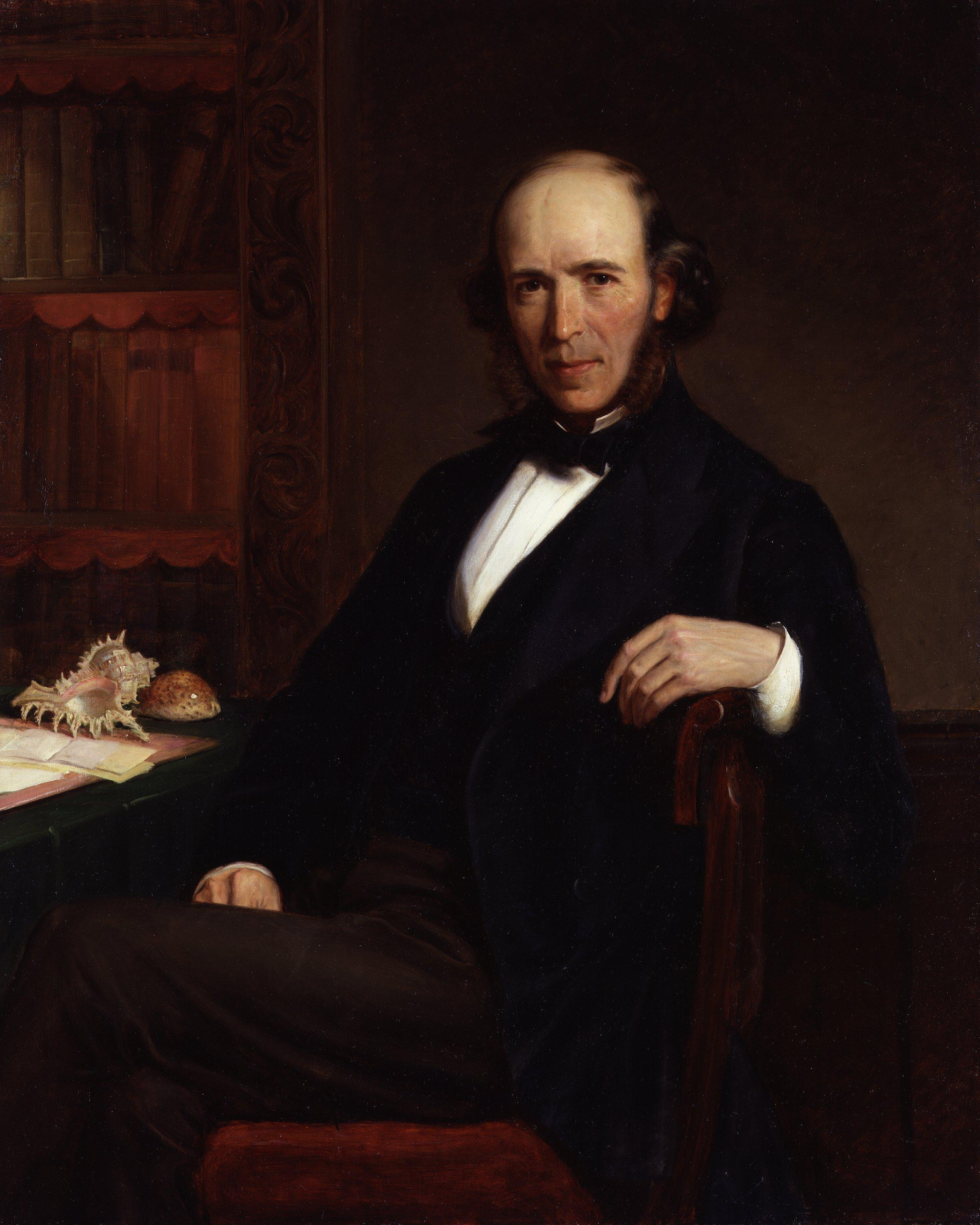
Portrait of Spencer by John Bagnold Burgess, 1871–72

Spencer first articulated his evolutionary perspective in his essay, 'Progress: Its Law and Cause', published in Chapman's Westminster Review in 1857, and which later formed the basis of the First Principles of a New System of Philosophy (1862). In it he expounded a theory of evolution which combines insights from Samuel Taylor Coleridge's essay 'The Theory of Life' – itself derivative from Friedrich von Schelling's Naturphilosophie – with a generalisation of von Baer's law of embryological development. Spencer posited that all structures in the universe develop from a simple, undifferentiated, homogeneity to a complex, differentiated, heterogeneity while undergoing increasing integration of the differentiated parts. This evolutionary process can be observed, Spencer believed, throughout the cosmos. It is a universal law, applying to the stars and galaxies and to biological organisms, and to human social organisation and to the human mind. It differed from other scientific laws only in its greater generality, and the laws of the special sciences can be shown to be illustrations of this principle.

The principles described by Herbert Spencer received a variety of interpretations. Bertrand Russell stated in a letter to Beatrice Webb in 1923: 'I don't know whether [Spencer] was ever made to realize the implications of the second law of thermodynamics; if so, he may well be upset. The law says that everything tends to uniformity and a dead level, diminishing (not increasing) heterogeneity'.

Spencer's attempt to explain the evolution of complexity was radically different from that of Darwin's Origin of Species which was published two years later. Spencer is often, quite erroneously, believed to have merely appropriated and generalised Darwin's work on natural selection. But although after reading Darwin's work he coined the phrase 'survival of the fittest' as his own term for Darwin's concept, and is often misrepresented as a thinker who merely applied the Darwinian theory to society, he only grudgingly incorporated natural selection into his preexisting overall system. The primary mechanism of species transformation that he recognised was Lamarckian use-inheritance which posited that organs are developed or are diminished by use or disuse and that the resulting changes may be transmitted to future generations. Spencer believed that this evolutionary mechanism is also necessary to explain 'higher' evolution, especially the social development of humanity. Moreover, in contrast to Darwin, he held that evolution has a direction and an end-point, the attainment of a final state of equilibrium. He tried to apply the theory of biological evolution to sociology. He proposed that society is the product of change from lower to higher forms, just as in the theory of biological evolution, the lowest forms of life are said to be evolving into higher forms. Spencer claimed that man's mind has evolved in the same way from the simple automatic responses of lower animals to the process of reasoning in the thinking man. Spencer believed in two kinds of knowledge: knowledge gained by the individual and knowledge gained by the race. According to his thinking, intuition or knowledge learned unconsciously is the inherited experience of the race.

Spencer in his book Principles of Biology (1864), proposed a pangenesis theory that involves "physiological units" assumed to be related to specific body parts and responsible for the transmission of characteristics to offspring. These hypothetical hereditary units are similar to Darwin's gemmules.

=== Social Darwinism and racial views ===
For many, the name of Herbert Spencer is virtually synonymous with Social Darwinism, a social theory that applies the law of the survival of the fittest to society and is integrally related to the nineteenth-century rise in scientific racism. In his famed work Social Statics (1850), he argued that imperialism had served civilization by clearing the inferior races off the earth: "The forces which are working out the great scheme of perfect happiness, taking no account of incidental suffering, exterminate such sections of mankind as stand in their way. ... Be he human or be he brute – the hindrance must be got rid of." Yet, in the same work, Spencer goes on to say that the incidental evolutionary benefits derived from such barbarous practices do not serve as justifications for them going forward.

Spencer's association with social Darwinism might have its origin in a specific interpretation of his support for competition. Whereas in biology the competition of various organisms can result in the death of a species or organism, the kind of competition Spencer advocated is closer to the one used by economists, where competing individuals or firms improve the well-being of the rest of society. Spencer viewed private charity positively, encouraging both voluntary association and informal care to aid those in need, rather than relying on government bureaucracy or force. He further recommended that private charitable efforts would be wise to avoid encouraging the formation of new dependent families by those unable to support themselves without charity. Focusing on the form as well as the content of Spencer's System of Synthetic Philosophy, one writer has identified it as the paradigmatic case of "social Darwinism", understood as a politically motivated metaphysic very different in both form and motivation from Darwinist science.

In a letter to the Japanese government regarding intermarriage with Westerners, Spencer stated that "if you mix the constitution of two widely divergent varieties which have severally become adapted to widely divergent modes of life, you get a constitution which is adapted to the mode of life of neither – a constitution which will not work properly." He goes on to say that America has failed to limit the immigration of Chinese and restrict their contact, especially sexual, with the presumed European stock. He states "if they mix they must form a bad hybrid" regarding the issue of Chinese and (ethnically European) Americans. Spencer ends his letter with the following blanket statement against all immigration: "In either case, supposing the immigration to be large, immense social mischief must arise, and eventually social disorganization. The same thing will happen if there should be any considerable mixture of European or American races with the Japanese."

=== Sociology ===
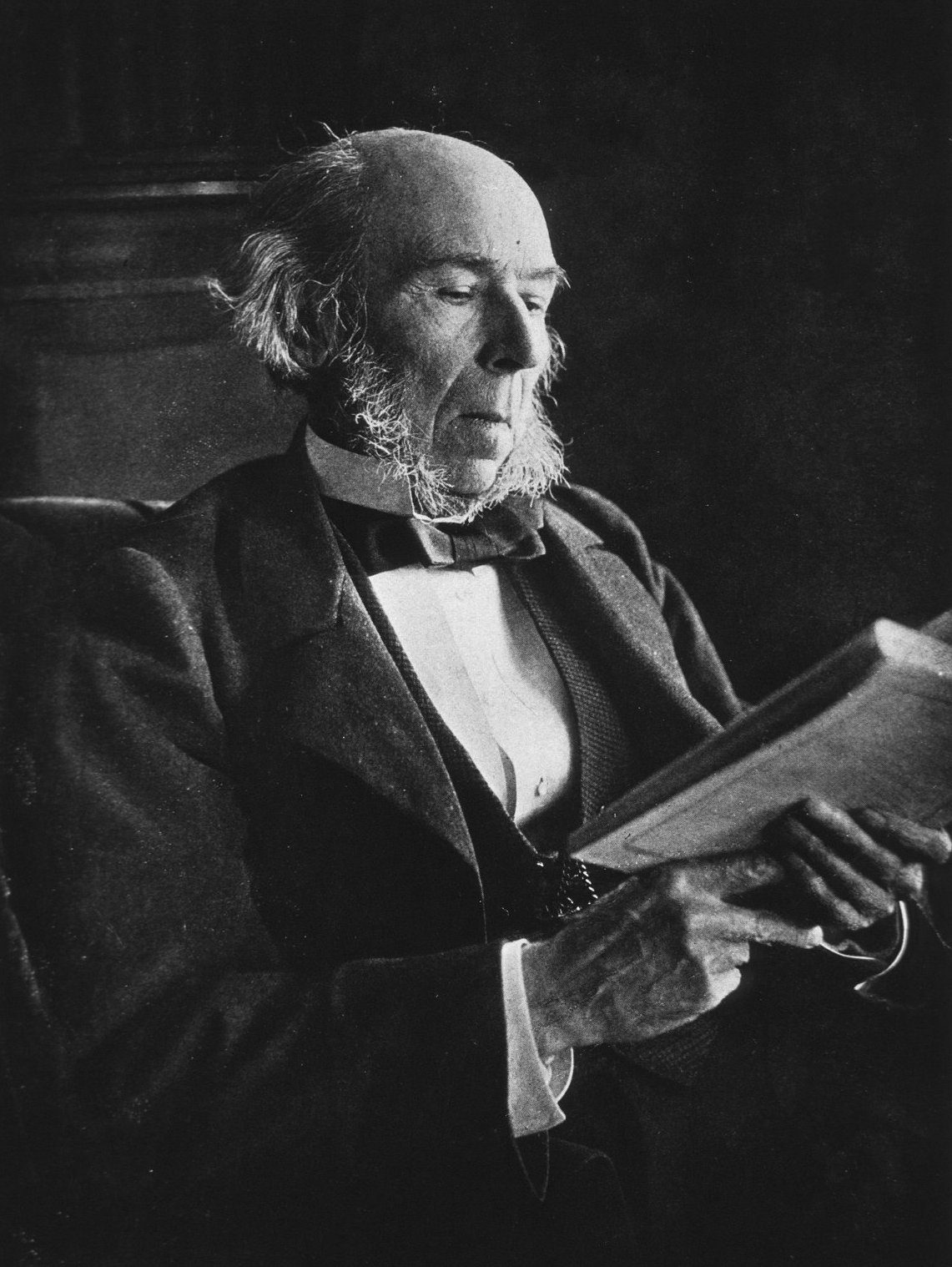
In his 70s

Spencer read with excitement the original positivist sociology of Auguste Comte. A philosopher of science, Comte had proposed a theory of sociocultural evolution that society progresses by a general law of three stages. Writing after various developments in biology, however, Spencer rejected what he regarded as the ideological aspects of Comte's positivism, attempting to reformulate social science in terms of his principle of evolution, which he applied to the biological, psychological and sociological aspects of the universe. Spencer is also generally credited as the first to use the term 'social structure.'

Given the primacy which Spencer placed on evolution, his sociology might be described as social Darwinism mixed with Lamarckism. However, despite its popularity, this view of Spencer's sociology is mistaken. While his political and ethical writings have themes consistent with social Darwinism, such themes are absent in Spencer's sociological works, which focus on how processes of societal growth and differentiation lead to changing degrees of complexity in social organization.

The evolutionary progression from simple, undifferentiated homogeneity to complex, differentiated heterogeneity is exemplified, Spencer argued, by the development of society. He developed a theory of two types of society, the militant and the industrial, which corresponded to this evolutionary progression. Militant society, structured around relationships of hierarchy and obedience, is simple and undifferentiated; industrial society, based on voluntary, contractually assumed social obligations, is complex and differentiated. Society, which Spencer conceptualised as a 'social organism' evolved from the simpler state to the more complex according to the universal law of evolution. Moreover, industrial society is the direct descendant of the ideal society developed in Social Statics, although Spencer now equivocated over whether the evolution of society would result in anarchism (as he had first believed) or whether it points to a continued role for the state, albeit one reduced to the minimal functions of the enforcement of contracts and external defence.

Though Spencer made some valuable contributions to early sociology, not least in his influence on structural functionalism, his attempt to introduce Lamarckian or Darwinian ideas into the realm of sociology was unsuccessful. It was considered by many, furthermore, to be actively dangerous. Hermeneuticians of the period, such as Wilhelm Dilthey, would pioneer the distinction between the natural sciences (Naturwissenschaften) and human sciences (Geisteswissenschaften). In the United States, the sociologist Lester Frank Ward, who would be elected as the first president of the American Sociological Association, launched a relentless attack on Spencer's theories of laissez-faire and political ethics. Although Ward admired much of Spencer's work, he believed that Spencer's prior political biases had distorted his thought and had led him astray. In the 1890s, Émile Durkheim established formal academic sociology with a firm emphasis on practical social research. By the turn of the 20th century, the first generation of German sociologists, most notably Max Weber, had presented methodological antipositivism. However, Spencer's theories of laissez-faire, survival-of-the-fittest and minimal human interference in the processes of natural law had an enduring and even increasing appeal in the social science fields of economics and political science, and one writer has recently made the case for Spencer's importance for a sociology that must learn to take energy in society seriously.

=== Synthetic philosophy ===
The basis for Spencer's appeal to many of his generation was that his synthetic philosophy appeared to offer a ready-made system of belief that could substitute for conventional religious faith at a time when orthodox creeds were crumbling under the advances of modern science. Spencer's philosophical system seemed to demonstrate that it is possible to believe in the ultimate perfection of humanity on the basis of advanced scientific conceptions such as the first law of thermodynamics and biological evolution.

In essence, Spencer's philosophical vision was formed by a combination of deism and positivism. On the one hand, he had imbibed something of eighteenth-century deism from his father and other members of the Derby Philosophical Society and from books like George Combe's immensely popular The Constitution of Man (1828). This treated the world as a cosmos of benevolent design, and the laws of nature as the decrees of a 'Being transcendentally kind.' Natural laws are thus the statutes of a well-governed universe that have been decreed by the Creator with the intention of promoting human happiness. Although Spencer lost his Christian faith as a teenager and later rejected any 'anthropomorphic' conception of the Deity, he nonetheless held fast to this conception at an almost subconscious level. At the same time, however, he owed far more than he would ever acknowledge to positivism, in particular in its conception of a philosophical system as the unification of the various branches of scientific knowledge. He also followed positivism in his insistence that it is only possible to have genuine knowledge of phenomena and hence that it is idle to speculate about the nature of the ultimate reality. The tension between positivism and his residual deism ran through the entire System of Synthetic Philosophy.

Spencer followed Comte in aiming for the unification of scientific truth; it was in this sense that his philosophy aimed to be 'synthetic.' Like Comte, he was committed to the universality of natural law, the idea that the laws of nature apply without exception, to the organic realm as much as to the inorganic, and to the human mind as much as to the rest of creation. The first objective of synthetic philosophy was thus to demonstrate that there are no exceptions to being able to discover scientific explanations, in the form of natural laws, of all the phenomena of the universe. Spencer's volumes on biology, psychology, and sociology were all intended to demonstrate the existence of natural laws in these specific disciplines. Even in his writings on ethics, he held that it is possible to discover 'laws' of morality that have the status of laws of nature while still having normative content, a conception which can be traced to George Combe's Constitution of Man.

The second objective of the synthetic philosophy was to show that these same laws lead inexorably to progress. In contrast to Comte, who stressed only the unity of the scientific method, Spencer sought the unification of scientific knowledge in the form of the reduction of all natural laws to one fundamental law, the law of evolution. In this respect, he followed the model laid down by the Edinburgh publisher Robert Chambers in his anonymous Vestiges of the Natural History of Creation (1844). Although often dismissed as a lightweight forerunner of Charles Darwin's The Origin of Species, Chambers' book was, in reality, a programme for the unification of science which aimed to show that Laplace's nebular hypothesis for the origin of the Solar System and Lamarck's theory of species transformation are both instances of 'one magnificent generalisation of progressive development' (Lewes' phrase). Chambers was associated with Chapman's salon and his work served as the unacknowledged template for the synthetic philosophy.

== Political views ==
Spencerian views in 21st-century circulation derive from his political theories and memorable attacks on the reform movements of the late 19th century. He has been claimed as a precursor by right-libertarians and anarcho-capitalists. Austrian School economist Murray Rothbard called Social Statics "the greatest single work of libertarian political philosophy ever written." Spencer argued that the state is not an "essential" institution and that it will "decay" as a voluntary market organisation comes to replace the coercive aspects of the state. He also argued that the individual has a "right to ignore the state." As a result of this perspective, Spencer was harshly critical of imperialism. In response to being told that British troops were in danger during the Second Afghan War (1878–1880) he replied: "When men hire themselves out to shoot other men to order, asking nothing about the justice of their cause, I don't care if they are shot themselves."

Politics in late Victorian Britain moved in directions that Spencer disliked, and his arguments provided so much ammunition for conservatives and individualists in Europe and America that they are still in use in the 21st century. The expression "There is no alternative" (TINA), made famous by prime minister Margaret Thatcher, may be traced to its emphatic use by Spencer. By the 1880s, he was denouncing "the new Toryism", that is, the "social reformist wing" of the Liberal Party, the wing to some extent hostile to prime minister William Ewart Gladstone. This faction of the Liberal Party Spencer compared to the interventionist "Toryism" of such people as the former Conservative Party prime minister Benjamin Disraeli. In The Man Versus the State (1884), he attacked Gladstone and the Liberal Party for losing its proper mission (they should be defending personal liberty, he said) and instead promoting paternalist social legislation (what Gladstone himself called "Construction", an element in the modern Liberal party that he opposed). Spencer denounced Irish land reform, compulsory education, laws to regulate safety at work, prohibition and temperance laws, tax-funded libraries, and welfare reforms. His main objections were threefold: the use of the coercive powers of the government, the discouragement given to voluntary self-improvement, and the disregard of the "laws of life". The reforms, he said, were tantamount to "socialism", which he said was about the same as "slavery" in terms of limiting human freedom. Spencer vehemently attacked the widespread enthusiasm for the annexation of colonies and imperial expansion, which subverted all he had predicted about evolutionary progress from 'militant' to 'industrial' societies and states.

Spencer anticipated many of the analytical standpoints of later right-libertarian theorists such as Friedrich Hayek, especially in his "law of equal liberty", his insistence on the limits to predictive knowledge, his model of spontaneous social order, and his warnings about the "unintended consequences" of collectivist social reforms. While often caricatured as ultra-conservative, Spencer had been more radical, or left-libertarian, earlier in his career, opposing private property in land and claiming that each person has a latent claim to participate in the use of the earth (views that influenced Georgism), calling himself "a radical feminist" and advocating the organisation of trade unions as a bulwark against "exploitation by bosses", and favoured an economy organised primarily in free worker co-operatives as a replacement for wage-labor. Although he retained support for unions, his views on the other issues had changed by the 1880s. He came to predict that social welfare programmes would eventually lead to the socialisation of the means of production, saying "all socialism is slavery." Spencer defined a slave as a person who "labours under coercion to satisfy another's desires" and believed that under socialism or communism the individual would be enslaved to the whole community rather than to a particular master, and "it means not whether his master is a single person or society."

== General influence ==
While most philosophers fail to achieve much of a following outside the academy of their professional peers, by the 1870s and 1880s Spencer had achieved an unparalleled popularity, as the sheer volume of his sales indicate. He was perhaps the only philosopher in history to sell over a million copies of his works during his own lifetime. In the United States, where pirated editions were still commonplace, his authorised publisher, Appleton, sold 368,755 copies between 1860 and 1903. This figure did not differ much from his sales in his native Britain, and, once editions in the rest of the world are added in, the figure of a million copies seems like a conservative estimate. As William James remarked, Spencer "enlarged the imagination, and set free the speculative mind of countless doctors, engineers, and lawyers, of many physicists and chemists, and of thoughtful laymen generally." The aspect of his thought that emphasised individual self-improvement found a ready audience in the skilled working class.

Spencer's influence among leaders of thought was also immense, though it was most often expressed in terms of their reaction to, and repudiation of, his ideas. As his American follower John Fiske observed, Spencer's ideas were to be found "running like the weft through all the warp" of Victorian thought. Such varied thinkers as Henry Sidgwick, T.H. Green, G.E. Moore, William James, Henri Bergson, and Émile Durkheim defined their ideas in relation to his. Durkheim's Division of Labour in Society is to a very large extent an extended debate with Spencer, from whose sociology, many commentators now agree, Durkheim borrowed extensively.

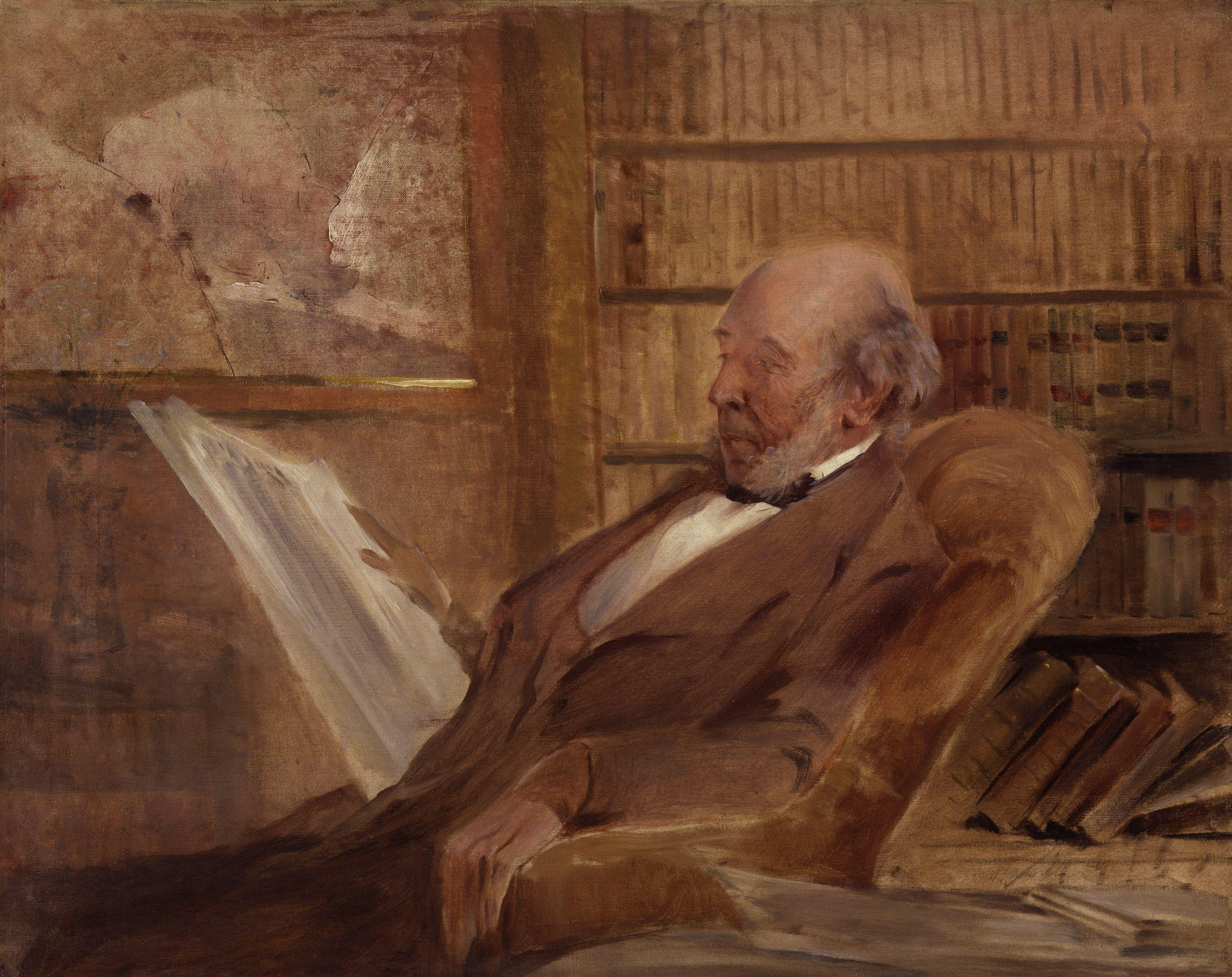
Portrait of Spencer by John McLure Hamilton, c. 1895

In post-1863-Uprising Poland, many of Spencer's ideas became integral to the dominant fin-de-siècle ideology, "Polish Positivism". The leading Polish writer of the period, Bolesław Prus, hailed Spencer as "the Aristotle of the nineteenth century" and adopted Spencer's metaphor of society-as-organism, giving it a striking poetic presentation in his 1884 micro-story, "Mold of the Earth", and highlighting the concept in the introduction to his most universal novel, Pharaoh (1895).

The early 20th century was hostile to Spencer. Soon after his death, his philosophical reputation went into a sharp decline. Half a century after his death, his work was dismissed as a "parody of philosophy", and the historian Richard Hofstadter called him "the metaphysician of the homemade intellectual, and the prophet of the cracker-barrel agnostic." Nonetheless, Spencer's thought had penetrated so deeply into the Victorian age that his influence did not disappear entirely.

In recent years, much more positive estimates have appeared, as well as a still highly negative estimate.

=== Political influence ===
Despite his reputation as a social Darwinist, Spencer's political thought has been open to multiple interpretations. His political philosophy could both provide inspiration to those who believed that individuals were masters of their fate, who should brook no interference from a meddling state, and those who believed that social development required a strong central authority. In Lochner v. New York, conservative justices of the United States Supreme Court could find inspiration in Spencer's writings for striking down a New York law limiting the number of hours a baker could work during the week, on the ground that this law restricted liberty of contract. Arguing against the majority's holding that a "right to free contract" is implicit in the Due Process Clause of the Fourteenth Amendment, Oliver Wendell Holmes Jr. wrote: "The Fourteenth Amendment does not enact Mr. Herbert Spencer's Social Statics." Spencer has also been described as a quasi-anarchist, as well as an outright anarchist. Marxist theorist Georgi Plekhanov, in his 1909 book Anarchism and Socialism, labelled Spencer a "conservative Anarchist".

Spencer's work has frequently been seen as a model for later libertarian thinkers, such as Robert Nozick, and he continues to be read – and is often invoked – by libertarians on issues concerning the function of government and the fundamental character of individual rights.

Spencer's ideas also became very influential in China and Japan largely because he appealed to the reformers' desire to establish a strong nation-state with which to compete with the Western powers. His thought was introduced by the Chinese scholar Yen Fu, who saw his writings as a prescription for the reform of the Qing state. Spencerism was so influential in China that it was synthesized into the Chinese translation of the Origin of Species, in which Darwin's branching view of evolution was converted into a linear-progressive one. Spencer also influenced the Japanese Westernizer Tokutomi Soho, who believed that Japan was on the verge of transitioning from a "militant society" to an "industrial society", and needed to quickly jettison all things Japanese and take up Western ethics and learning. He also corresponded with Kaneko Kentaro, warning him of the dangers of imperialism. Savarkar writes, in his Inside the Enemy Camp, about reading all of Spencer's works, of his great interest in them, of their translation into Marathi, and their influence on the likes of Tilak and Agarkar, and the affectionate sobriquet given to him in Maharashtra – Harbhat Pendse.

=== Influence on literature ===
Spencer greatly influenced literature and rhetoric. His 1852 essay, "The Philosophy of Style", explored a growing trend of formalist approaches to writing. Highly focused on the proper placement and ordering of the parts of an English sentence, he created a guide for effective composition. Spencer aimed to free prose writing from as much "friction and inertia" as possible, so that the reader would not be slowed by strenuous deliberations concerning the proper context and meaning of a sentence. Spencer argued that writers should aim "To so present ideas that they may be apprehended with the least possible mental effort" by the reader.

He argued that by making the meaning as readily accessible as possible, the writer would achieve the greatest possible communicative efficiency. This was accomplished, according to Spencer, by placing all the subordinate clauses, objects and phrases before the subject of a sentence so that, when readers reached the subject, they had all the information they needed to completely perceive its significance. While the overall influence that "The Philosophy of Style" had on the field of rhetoric was not as far-reaching as his contribution to other fields, Spencer's voice lent authoritative support to formalist views of rhetoric.

Spencer influenced literature inasmuch as many novelists and short story authors came to address his ideas in their work. Spencer was referenced by George Eliot, Leo Tolstoy, Machado de Assis, Thomas Hardy, Bolesław Prus, George Bernard Shaw, Abraham Cahan, Richard Austin Freeman, Rabindranath Tagore, D. H. Lawrence, and Jorge Luis Borges. Arnold Bennett greatly praised First Principles, and the influence it had on Bennett may be seen in his many novels. Jack London went so far as to create a character, Martin Eden, a staunch Spencerian. It has also been suggested that the character of Vershinin in Anton Chekhov's play The Three Sisters is a dedicated Spencerian. H. G. Wells used Spencer's ideas as a theme in his novella, The Time Machine, employing them to explain the evolution of man into two species. It is perhaps the best testimony to the influence of Spencer's beliefs and writings that his reach was so diverse. He influenced not only the administrators who shaped their societies' inner workings, but also the artists who helped shape those societies' ideals and beliefs. In Rudyard Kipling's novel Kim, the Anglophile Bengali spy Hurree Babu admires Herbert Spencer and quotes him to comic effect: "They are, of course, dematerialised phenomena. Spencer says." "I am good enough Herbert Spencerian, I trust, to meet little thing like death, which is all in my fate, you know." "He thanked all the Gods of Hindustan, and Herbert Spencer, that there remained some valuables to steal." Upton Sinclair, in One Clear Call, 1948, quips that "Huxley said that Herbert Spencer's idea of a tragedy was a generalization killed by a fact; ..."

== Bibliography ==
- Papers of Herbert Spencer in Senate House Library, University of London
- "Education". 1861. Archived from the original on 16 October 2012 – via Questia.
- System of Synthetic Philosophy, in ten volumes
  - First Principles ISBN 0898757959 (1862)
  - Principles of Biology (1864, 1867; revised and enlarged: 1898), in two volumes
    - Volume I – Part I: The Data of Biology; Part II: The Inductions of Biology; Part III: The Evolution of Life; Appendices
    - Volume II – Part IV: Morphological Development; Part V: Physiological Development; Part VI: Laws of Multiplication; Appendices
  - Principles of Psychology (1870, 1880), in two volumes
    - Volume I – Part I: The Data of Psychology; Part II: The Inductions of Psychology; Part III: General Synthesis; Part IV: Special Synthesis; Part V: Physical Synthesis; Appendix
    - Volume II – Part VI: Special Analysis; Part VII: General Analysis; Part VIII: Congruities; Part IX: Corollaries
  - Principles of Sociology, in three volumes
    - Volume I (1874–75; enlarged 1876, 1885) – Part I: Data of Sociology; Part II: Inductions of Sociology; Part III: Domestic Institutions
    - Volume II – Part IV: Ceremonial Institutions (1879); Part V: Political Institutions (1882); Part VI [published here in some editions]: Ecclesiastical Institutions (1885)
    - Volume III – Part VI [published here in some editions]: Ecclesiastical Institutions (1885); Part VII: Professional Institutions (1896); Part VIII: Industrial Institutions (1896); References
  - Principles of Ethics, in two volumes
    - Volume I – Part I: The Data of Ethics (1879); Part II: The Inductions of Ethics (1892); Part III: The Ethics of Individual Life (1892); References
    - Volume II – Part IV: The Ethics of Social Life: Justice (1891); Part V: The Ethics of Social Life: Negative Beneficence (1892); Part VI: The Ethics of Social Life: Positive Beneficence (1892); Appendices
- The Study of Sociology (1873, 1896)
- An Autobiography (1904), in two volumes

See also Spencer, Herbert (1904). An Autobiography. D. Appleton and Company.

- v1 Life and Letters of Herbert Spencer by David Duncan (1908)
- v2 Life and Letters of Herbert Spencer by David Duncan (1908)
- Descriptive Sociology; or Groups of Sociological Facts, parts 1–8, classified and arranged by Spencer, compiled and abstracted by David Duncan, Richard Schepping, and James Collier (London, Williams & Norgate, 1873–1881).

Essay collections

- Illustrations of Universal Progress: A Series of Discussions (1864, 1883)
- The Man Versus the State (1884)
- Essays: Scientific, Political, and Speculative (1891), in three volumes:
  - Volume I (includes "The Development Hypothesis", "Progress: Its Law and Cause", "The Factors of Organic Evolution" and others)
  - Volume II (includes "The Classification of the Sciences", The Philosophy of Style (1852), The Origin and Function of Music", "The Physiology of Laughter", and others)
  - Volume III (includes "The Ethics of Kant", "State Tamperings With Money and Banks", "Specialized Administration", "From Freedom to Bondage", "The Americans", and others)
- Various Fragments (1897, enlarged 1900)
- Facts and Comments (1902)
- Great Political Thinkers (1960)

== See also ==
- Auberon Herbert
- Geolibertarianism
- Organicism
- Walter Bagehot
