= Darwinian puzzle =

Concept in evolutionary biology

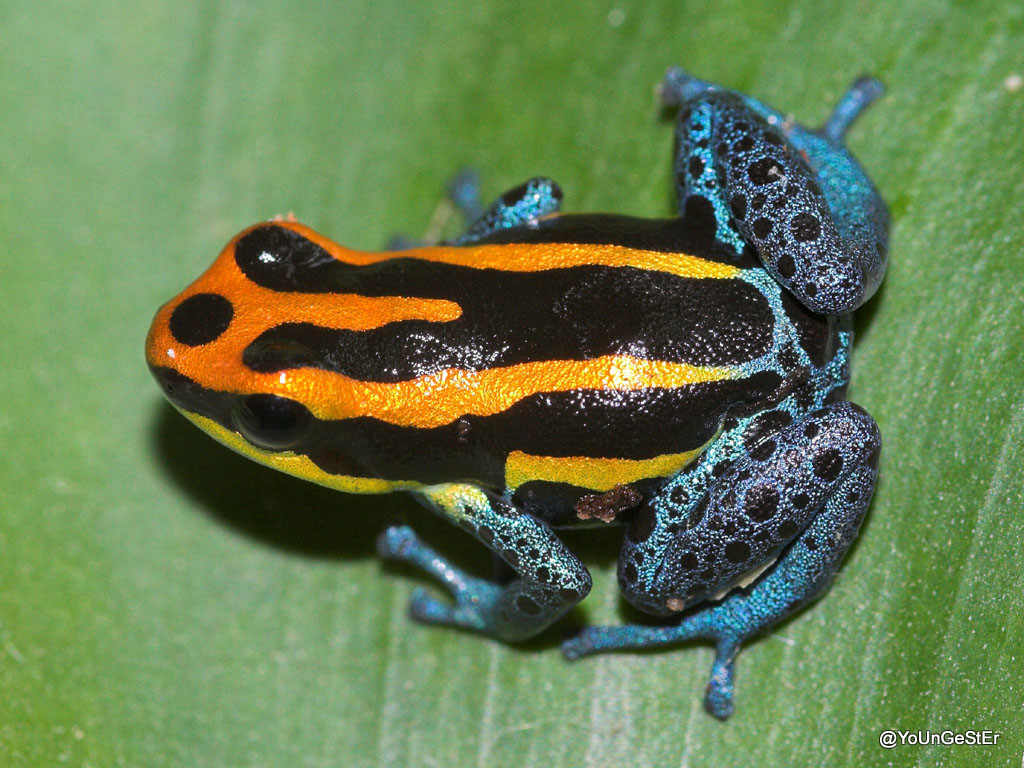
The coloration of the poison dart frog is readily visible to predators.

A Darwinian puzzle is a trait that appears to reduce the fitness of individuals that possess it. Such traits attract the attention of evolutionary biologists. Several human traits pose challenges to evolutionary thinking, as they are relatively prevalent but are associated with lower reproductive success through reduced fertility and/or longevity. Some of the classic examples include: left handedness, menopause, and mental disorders. These traits are also found in animals, a peacock shows an example of a trait that may reduce its fitness. The bigger the tail, the easier it is seen by predators and it also may hinder the movement of the peacock. Darwin, in fact, solved this "puzzle" by explaining the peacock's tail as evidence of sexual selection; a bigger tail confers evolutionary fitness on the male by allowing it to attract more females than other males with shorter tails. The phrase "Darwinian puzzle" itself is rare and of unclear origin; it's typically talked about in the context of animal behavior.

== Applications in nature ==
Darwinian puzzles are evident in nature, even though it appears to reduce the fitness of the individual that possesses it. Different individuals use the odd phenomenon in particular ways such as toxins, fitness demonstration, and mimicry.

== Factors that affect Darwinian puzzles ==
There are a few contributing factors in biology which may affect Darwinian puzzles.

- Coefficient of relatedness (r): the percentage of genes shared by two animals.

This may be based on common descent. Animals may share 1/4, 1/2, or even in some cases all of their genes with others. Identical twins have a coefficient of relatedness of r=1. Full siblings have a coefficient of relatedness of r=.50, and half siblings and first cousins have a coefficient of relatedness of r=.25. Depending on how related two animals are, they may be more likely to act altruistically to one another. Even if it is of no benefit to themselves, it helps to promote survival of at least some of their genes as they are shared with others closely related to them. The formula to calculate coefficient of relatedness is (R_{XY}) = Σ (1/2)^{n.}

- Hamilton's rule: an explanation for when a Darwinian puzzle may evolve in a population.

Hamilton's rule is often used to explain altruism in populations based upon relatedness. It can be represented by the formula (rB > C) where r represents relatedness, B represents benefit to the recipient, and C represents cost to the altruist. Animals may use Hamilton's rule in many instances where it will not promote their own fitness, but will have an evolutionary effect on the overall fitness of the species in general.

== Examples ==
The following phenomena are sometimes called Darwinian puzzles:

- Altruism in animals
  - Biological altruism: Tends to be centered around fitness exchanges. It can also be called evolutionary or reproductive altruism. It is defined as "increasing other organisms fitness while decreasing the fitness of the actor themselves". In order for this to be true, both the loss of the "actor" and the benefit of the "recipient" must be present. It is not just how the behavior affects fitness but all the other characteristics that make up fitness as well.
  - Psychological altruism: This is based on the intentions of the one doing the behavior. It is defined by stating that "A behavior is psychologically altruistic if and only if it is motivated by an ultimate desire for the well-being of some other organism, and as a first pass, we can say that a desire is ultimate if its object is desired for its own sake, rather than because the agent thinks that satisfying the desire will lead to the satisfaction of some other desire". An example is giving money to a charity with the intent to help others, even if the money never actually reaches that specific charity. However, if a person gives money to charity in order for others to think that they are selfless is not performing a psychologically altruistic behavior.
  - Helping altruism: Combines biological with psychological but is the least common of the three. It represents the reason for the behavior as well as the possible fitness outcomes because of the behavior. To best quote to explain this behavior is "we may ask whether human altruism is intrinsically or extrinsically motivated; that is, do human beings help one another because the helpful act itself is inherently rewarding or only because the helpful act is instrumental in bringing about separate outcomes such as material rewards or the avoidance of punishment?" It does not have to consist of obtaining food or helping to raise young, it can be much milder than that (helping someone else reach a personal goal).
- Homosexuality
  - Uganda kobs: Of the species of Ugandan kobs, the females seem to be the only gender that participates in homosexual behavior. Female kobs are often seen soliciting other females by whistling at them and/or foreleg kicking in order to delicately touch other female genitals. Foreleg kicking can also be seen in male mountain rams, who also use it in order to engage in homosexual activities with other male rams. Female kobs also participate in mounting of other females, even though they cannot reproduce from the action alone. Females that participate in the courting of other females, may even compete for certain female choices by pushing competitors with their head. This action was originally thought to be a method for females not interested in homosexual courting to say no to pursuers, but was proven to be a way to gain dominance over other kobs. Even with these homosexual behaviors female kobs still mate with male kobs, which lead scientists to believe that these actions to practice sex or excite members of the same sex are to improve their chances for future reproductive sex. (2)
  - Greylag geese: Within this species of geese there are both heterosexual and homosexual couples. Male greylag geese often pair up and stay together for years, similar to male bottlenose dolphins. These males work together to find a mate and both father some of the goslings. As a result, in these relationships, goslings have three parents, a male couple and a mother. This not only benefits the growing geese, who have an extra parent to protect them, it also benefits the mother who gains a higher social status, more time to take care of the chicks and more time to find food for herself. During the time the mother is off feeding, the more dominant male fights off predators and the other stays to watch over the goslings. Once the relationship has run its course the female goose branches off while the two male geese continue through their lives together. (1)
- Cellular senescence
- Monarch butterfly: The monarch butterfly is a species that has an orange and black wing pattern that is very easy to spot. This coloration of the monarch is non-beneficial to its fitness. It is not beneficial because the bright colors will attract their predators. However, they are able to counteract this non-beneficial trait because they have the ability to feed on poisonous milk weed which deposits potent plant poison in their tissues. Therefore, when a predator ingests them it will induce them to vomit, because of the poison within the butterflies system. Though a monarch butterfly will be sacrificing itself through this process, it is able to help its own kind by educating their predators as to the harmfulness of eating them. The genetically similar monarchs will then be able to survive and pass on the shared genes to the next monarch generation.
- Poisonous dart frog: The poison dart frog species (members of the Dendrobatidae genus) are another prominent example of an animal that applies to the concept of the Darwinian puzzle. The bright, conspicuous coloration of their skin is a tactic used to warn predators that they are highly toxic. The two-inch-long (five centimeters) golden poison dart frog has enough venom to kill ten grown men. Indigenous Emberá people brush the tips of their arrows across the frogs' skin to make the arrows toxic. This method is a highly effective hunting tool and has earned the frog species its name "poisonous dart frog". Scientists predict that the frogs assimilate their toxins from the prey that they eat consisting of ants and termites. The frogs demonstrate the Darwinian puzzle because of the bright coloration that would be thought to attract predators. Instead, they present themselves as a warning.
- Gazelle stotting: The Darwinian puzzle also manifests in the behavior of gazelles when they stott. They do this to advertise to predators that they are physically fit and the predator will not catch them if they choose to pursue. This is a form of predator deterrence, but at the same time it makes the gazelle more visible to the predator. There is also more caloric expenditure when the gazelle stots which would be counter-intuitive to survival. Another Darwinian puzzle that scientists are trying to interpret is the stotting behavior of Thomson gazelles. The gazelle sacrifices its speed whilst escaping from one predator, but searches for other predators up ahead. Another potential reasoning for this stotting behavior is that it will alert their herd that a predator is nearby. Predators, such as cheetahs, realize that when a gazelle is stotting they are less likely to capture their prey so they abandon hunts.
- Conspicuous spider web: There are orb-weaving spiders that spin webs with zigzag patterns that are clear, and visible to their prey. The visibility of the web decoration is thought to deter prey from the web, but in actuality it acts as a lure to draw the prey into it. The prey is more inclined to avoid the visible patterns and become caught in the webbing between the zigzag patterns. The spiders also use it as a form of camouflage to obscure their bodies. Studies have shown that orb-weaving spiders with ornamented webs have greater success catching prey than the unornamented web spiders.
- Mimicry: Many species have the trait known as mimicry which allows normally harmless creatures to appear dangerous. Harmless hoverflies are an example of a species that exhibits mimicry. Hoverflies mimic the look and sound of wasps. Though most of them resemble the wasps very closely, others barely pass as looking like the wasps. In order to solve this Darwinian puzzle of why certain hoverflies do not resemble the wasps closely, Canadian researchers conducted a study. In this study the researchers determined that larger hoverflies will closely resemble the wasps where the smaller species barely mimic them. This was determined to be due to the larger species having a greater threat of being attacked by birds. The smaller species do not have to worry about closely impersonating the wasps as much because the birds will not even bother to try to attack them due to their size. Since the larger hoverflies impersonate the wasps, they will have a greater chance of surviving and will therefore increase their fitness.

== See also ==
- Evolutionary biology
- Handicap principle
- Stotting
- Natural selection
- Mimicry
- Charles Darwin
