= The Man Versus the State =

1884 book by Herbert Spencer

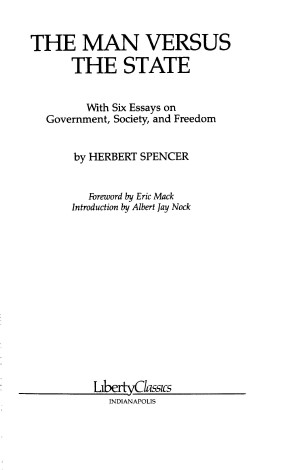
- The Man Versus the State by Herbert Spencer
- Author: Herbert Spencer
- Language: English
- Genre: Political Theory and Philosophy
- Publisher: Williams and Norgate, London and Edinburgh
- Publication date: 1884

The Man Versus the State is a work of political theory by Herbert Spencer.

It was first published in book form in 1884 by Williams and Norgate, London and Edinburgh, from articles previously published in The Contemporary Review. The book consists of four main chapters: The New Toryism, The Coming Slavery, The Sins of Legislators and The Great Political Superstition. In this book, English libertarian sociologist Herbert Spencer sees a statist corruption appearing within the liberal ideological framework, and warns of what he calls "the coming slavery". He argues that liberalism, which liberated the world from slavery and feudalism, was undergoing a transformation. Its new love for the state would put liberalism behind a movement to create a new despotism that would be worse than the old. Henry Hazlitt commented that this was "One of the most powerful and influential arguments for limited government, laissez faire and individualism ever written."

"The function of Liberalism in the past was that of putting a limit to the powers of kings. The function of true Liberalism in the future will be that of putting a limit to the power of Parliaments."

— Herbert Spencer, The Man Versus the State

== The New Toryism ==
In the first chapter of the book, Herbert Spencer starts by saying that those of which who now pass as Liberals, actually act as Tories of a new type, and proceeds by arguing that the so-called liberals, who once fought for liberalization, liberties and limiting the power of the nobility, have now obtained interest in increasing the power of the parliament and the government instead of protecting the rights of the people; the liberals have changed their ways completely and adopted measures of increasing their importance in the lives of men just as the Tories did, by keeping power into their own hands. In his own words:

"And now comes the inquiry—How is it that Liberals have lost sight of this? How is it that Liberalism, getting more and more into power, has grown more and more coercive in its legislation? How is it that, either directly through its own majorities or indirectly through aid given in such cases to the majorities of its opponents, Liberalism has to an increasing extent adopted the policy of dictating the actions of citizens, and, by consequence, diminishing the range throughout which their actions remain free? How are we to explain this spreading confusion of thought which has led it, in pursuit of what appears to be public good, to invert the method by which in earlier days it achieved public good?"

— Herbert Spencer, The Man Versus the State; The New Toryism

Spencer argues that these new "Liberals" simply exchange the power of kings for that of parliament.

== The Coming Slavery ==
In his second chapter, Spencer focuses on the poor social class, reporting certain areas in London, and blaming the existence of poverty in these classes, and in a crude manner, its problems to the society as a whole, on the certain systems of that society in which the hard work of the young are not rewarded and tend to incline to criminality: such as the religious ones, in which, he argues, waste time reporting things which do not relate to the truth.

"The belief, not only of the socialists but also of those so-called Liberals who are diligently preparing the way for them, is that by due skill an ill-working humanity may be framed into well-working institutions. It is a delusion. The defective natures of citizens will show themselves in the bad acting of whatever social structure they are arranged into. There is no political alchemy by which you can get golden conduct out of leaden instincts."

— Herbert Spencer, The Man Versus the State; The Coming Slavery

== The Sins of Legislators ==
In this chapter, Spencer develops a picture of government as founded entirely in aggression (however much sublimated) and in attempting to exercise control almost doomed to failure because of an intrinsic inability to reckon with three facts, which Spencer holds are evident upon direct inspection: that social phenomena come from individual lives "which again have their roots in vital phenomena at large" and which are not chaotic; secondly, that this truth is clear both a priori and by comparison of social systems; thirdly, that by inspection of England's own internal historical record shows that "attempts of multitudinous kinds, made by kings and statesmen, have failed to do the good intended and have worked unexpected evils. Century after century new measures like the old ones, and other measures akin in principle, have again disappointed hopes and again brought disaster. And yet it is thought neither by electors nor by those they elect, that there is any need for systematic study of that law-making which in bygone ages went on working the ill-being of the people when it tried to achieve their well-being."

== The Great Political Superstition ==
In the concluding chapter, and based on the preceding chapters, Spencer critiques belief in the divine right of parliaments, which he describes as a successor to the prior divine right of kings and draws a picture of a proper nation in which government respects individual rights and acts correctly, i.e., rights-respectingly, on the international stage as well. "The great political superstition of the present is the divine right of parliaments. The oil of anointing seems unawares to have dripped from the head of the one on to the heads of the many, and given sacredness to them also and to their decrees."
